= Dair language =

Moribund Nubian language of Sudan

Dair
- Thaminyi
- Native to: Sudan
- Region: Nuba Mountains
- Native speakers: (1,000 cited 1978)
- Language family: Nilo-Saharan?: Eastern Sudanic; Northern Eastern; Nubian; Central; Hill; (Unclassified); Dair

Language codes
- ISO 639-3: drb
- Glottolog: dair1239
- ELP: Dair
- Dair is classified as Severely Endangered by the UNESCO Atlas of the World's Languages in Danger.

Dair (also Dabab, Daier, Jebel Dair, Thaminyi) is a moribund Hill Nubian language spoken in the northern Nuba Mountains in the south of Sudan. It was spoken by around 1,000 people in 1978 in the Jibaal as-Sitta hills, between Dilling and Delami.

The first documentation of the language by outsiders came in 1864, by German explorer Werner Munzinger. He reported that the language was called Kuliniri by the local people at that time. Junker and Czermak published a corpus of Dair transcriptions with phonetic and morphosyntactic notes in 1913.

== Classification ==
Dair is classified as a Nubian language, part of the Nilo-Saharan language family. It is grouped with the Hill Nubian (sometimes called Kordofan Nubian) languages. It is most closely related to its fellow Hill Nubian languages El Hugeirat, Ghulfan, and Kadaru.

== Geographic distribution ==
Dair is spoken in the Nuba Mountains.

== Phonology ==
=== Consonants ===
Junker and Czermak give the following consonantal inventory for Dair:

Consonant phonemes
	Bilabial	Labio- dental		Alveolar		Retroflex		Palatal		Velar		Labia- lized velar
Plosive	b			t	d	ʈ	ɖ	c	ɟ	k	ɡ	
Fricative		f	v					ç	ʝ			
Nasal	m				n		ɳ		ɲ		ŋ	ŋʷ
Approximant					ɹ		ɻ					
Lateral approximant					l		ɭ					

=== Vowels ===
Junker and Czermak are less precise with their vowel inventory. They list five cardinal vowels, a, e, i, o, and u, and note that "half-open" pronunciation of these vowels also occur. Vowel length is distinctive, with short and long vowels. Syllables can be stressed or unstressed.
