= List of endangered languages in Sudan =

Sudan is a multilingual country dominated by Sudanese Arabic. In the 2005 constitution of the Republic of Sudan, the official languages of Sudan are Arabic and English.

An endangered language is a language that it is at risk of falling out of use, generally because it has few surviving speakers. If it loses all of its native speakers, it becomes an extinct language.

== Sudan ==
Sudan
Language	Status	Comments	ISO 639-3
Acheron language	Severely endangered		acz
Afitti language	Severely endangered		aft
Belanda Bor language	Definitely endangered		bxb
Beli language	Definitely endangered		blm
Dair language	Severely endangered		drb
Dilling language	Definitely endangered		dil
Ebang language	Severely endangered		hbn
El Hugeirat language	Severely endangered		elh
Eliri language	Severely endangered		eli
Heiban language	Vulnerable		hbn
Kadaru language	Definitely endangered		kdu
Kanga language	Severely endangered		kcp
Karko language	Definitely endangered		kko
Katla language	Definitely endangered		kcr
Keiga language	Severely endangered		kec
Kelo language	Critically endangered		xel
Ko language	Critically endangered		fuj
Komo language	Definitely endangered	Also spoken in: Ethiopia	xom
Krongo language	Definitely endangered		kgo
Lafofa language	Severely endangered		laf
Laro language	Definitely endangered		lro
Logol language	Severely endangered		lof
Logorik language	Critically endangered		liu
Lumun language	Definitely endangered		lmd
Mo'da language	Critically endangered		gbn
Molo language	Critically endangered		zmo
Moro language	Definitely endangered		mor
Nding language	Critically endangered		eli
Ngile language	Severely endangered		jle
Otoro language	Severely endangered		otr
Shatt language	Severely endangered		shj
Sillok language	Definitely endangered		soh
Shwai language	Critically endangered		shw
Tagoi language	Severely endangered		tag
Talodi language	Critically endangered		tlo
Temein language	Severely endangered		teq
Tese language	Critically endangered		keg
Tima language	Severely endangered		tms
Tingal language	Definitely endangered		tie
Tocho language	Severely endangered		taz
Tulishi language	Severely endangered		tey
Tumtum language	Severely endangered		tbr
Wali language	Critically endangered		wll
Warnang language	Severely endangered		wrn
Yulu language	Vulnerable	Also spoken in: Central African Republic, Democratic Republic of the Congo	yul
