= Nubians =

Ethnolinguistic group native to northern Sudan and southern Egypt

Nⲟⲃⲓ̄
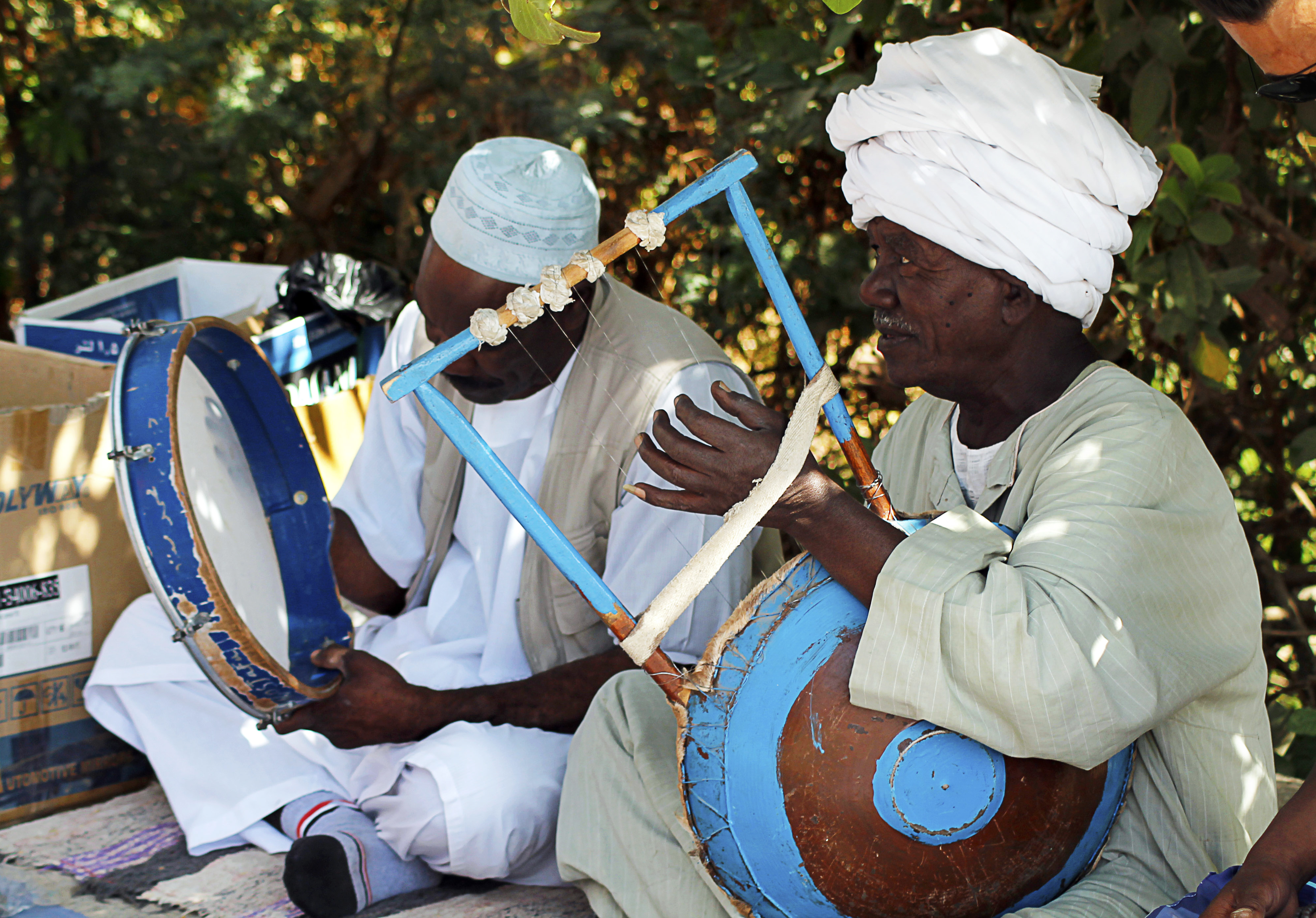
- Modern Nubian men in Aswan

Total population
- 5 million+

Regions with significant populations
- Sudan: 167,831 (1956 census); 812,000
- Egypt: 99,000 (1960s); 300,000–5 million

Languages
- Nubian languages (Note: Nubian languages include Nobiin, Kenzi, Dongolawi, Birgid, Midob and the Hill Nubian dialect continuum. They are spoken as either sole native languages or alongside a variant of Arabic by majority of Nubians.); Arabic (Sudanese Arabic, Sa'idi Arabic, Egyptian Arabic)

Religion
- Sunni Islam

Related ethnic groups
- Sudanese Arabs, Beja, Egyptians, Cushites, North Eastern Sudanic peoples, Nilotic peoples

Nubians (Nobiin: Nⲟⲃⲓ̄,) are an ethnic group indigenous to the Nubia region, which stretches from southern Egypt to northern Sudan. They originate from the early inhabitants of the central Nile valley, believed to be one of the earliest cradles of civilization. In the southern valley of Egypt, Nubians differ culturally and ethnically from Egyptians. They speak the Nilo-Saharan Nubian languages as their mother tongue, which are part of the Northern Eastern Sudanic languages, and Arabic as a second language.

Neolithic settlements have been found in the central Nubian region, dating back to 7000 BC, with Wadi Halfa believed to be the oldest settlement in the central Nile valley. Parts of Nubia, particularly Lower Nubia, were at times part of ancient Pharaonic Egypt and at other times a rival state representing parts of Meroë or the Kingdom of Kush. By the Twenty-fifth Dynasty (744 BC–656 BC), all of Egypt was united with Nubia, extending down to what is now Khartoum However, in 656 BC, the native Twenty-sixth Dynasty regained control of Egypt. As warriors, the ancient Nubians were famous for their skill and precision with the bow and arrow. In the Middle Ages, following the collapse of the Kingdom of Kush to the Axumites, and the closure of the last Ancient Egyptian temple by Emperor Justinian I, the Nubians started gradually converting to Christianity and established three kingdoms: Nobatia in the north, Makuria in the center, and Alodia in the south. They then converted to Islam during the Islamization of the Sudan region.

Nubians in Egypt primarily live in Aswan Governorate, especially in Kom Ombo and Nasr al-Nuba, north of Aswan, and large cities such as Cairo, while Sudanese Nubians live in Northern State, from the city of Wadi Halfa on the Egypt–Sudan border to al Dabbah near the Fourth Cataract, as well as in large cities such as Khartoum. Some Halfawi Nubians were forcibly relocated to Khashm el Girba and New Halfa upon the construction of the Aswan High Dam, while in Egypt, Faddicca and Kenzi Nubians were forcibly relocated to villages in 'New Nubia' near Kom Ombo. The construction of the Aswan High Dam displaced 100,000 Nubians in Egypt and Sudan and flooded much of Lower Nubia. Additionally, a group known as the Midob live in North Darfur, another group known as the Birgid live in Central Darfur and several groups known as the Hill Nubians live in Northern Kordofan in Haraza and a few villages in the northern Nuba Mountains in South Kordofan state.

The main Nile Nubian groups from north to south are the Kenzi (Kenzi/Mattokki-speaking), Faddicca (Nobiin-speaking), Halfawi (Nobiin-speaking), Sukkot (Nobiin-speaking), Mahas (Nobiin-speaking), and Danagla (Andaandi-speaking).

== Etymology ==
The region now known as Nubia was designated by various names in antiquity, referring to different territories, peoples, and political entities. Ancient Egyptian texts used terms such as Ancient Egyptian: tꜣ-stj ("Land of the Bow") and Ancient Egyptian: tꜣ nḥsj ("Land of the Nehesy"), while nḥsj.w designated peoples living south of Egypt. Other geographical names included wꜣwꜣt (Wawat), jrṯt (Irtjet), sṯjw (Setju), ꞽꜣm (Yam), and Kush. These terms were not interchangeable names for Nubia as a whole. The Meroitic name for Lower Nubia was Akine (pronounced /akin(ə)/). Greek and Roman authors generally referred to the region south of Egypt as Aethiopia (Ancient Greek: Αἰθιοπία), although the geographical scope of this term varied and could extend considerably beyond Nubia.

The origin of the names Nubia and Nubian has been debated. An older hypothesis derives the name from the ancient Egyptian word nbw ("gold"), reflecting the region's importance as a source of gold. However, there is no evidence that nbw was used as an ethnonym or geographical designation for Nubia in ancient Egyptian texts. The Institute for the Study of Ancient Cultures at the University of Chicago rejects this etymology and instead traces the modern geographical name, which emerged in medieval Europe, to Greek forms of the ethnonym Noba or Nobatae.

The earliest known historical reference to the Noba occurs in the third-century BC Geographica of Eratosthenes, preserved in Strabo's Geography (17.1.2). Eratosthenes described the Noubai (Ancient Greek: Νοῦβαι) as a numerous people inhabiting territories west of the Nile between Meroe and the bends of the river. He distinguished them from the Aethiopians of Meroe, describing the Noubai as politically independent and divided into several kingdoms. The ethnonym is also attested in Meroitic inscriptions. An inscription from Jebel Barkal, dating to approximately 100 BC (REM 0075), mentions the Noba, while a late first-century BC inscription from Meroe (REM 1180) identifies a captive as the king of the Noba. Later inscriptions record military conflicts between the Kushites and the Noba.

The linguist Claude Rilly has proposed an etymological relationship between Meroitic nob (pronounced /nuba/), used both as an ethnonym and with the meaning "slave", and Proto-Nubian *nogu ("slaves"). The reconstructed Proto-Nubian form is supported by cognate words meaning "slave" in several Nubian languages, including Dongolawi, Kordofan Nubian, and Midob. Rilly argues that the phonological correspondence reflects a regular development of an earlier *gu to /ba/ in Meroitic, rather than a direct borrowing between the two languages. He further suggests that the term may ultimately derive from a Proto-Northern East Sudanic root *log- ("earth, mud, clay"), perhaps originally referring to agricultural populations or people of the land. This more remote etymology remains hypothetical. According to Rilly, Noba was probably originally an external designation used by the Meroitic-speaking Kushites for neighboring populations, rather than their own self-designation.

By Late Antiquity, however, the designation had also been adopted by the Noba themselves. In a fifth-century AD Greek inscription at Kalabsha, Silko, ruler of Nobatia, described himself as "king of the Nobades and all the Aethiopians" (βασιλίσκος Νουβάδων καὶ ὅλων τῶν Αἰθιόπων). A sixth-century Greek inscription from Philae similarly records an individual named Theodosios identifying himself as a Nuba (Νουβα). These inscriptions demonstrate the adoption of the ethnonym by Nubian-speaking populations, from which the later geographical name Nubia ultimately developed.

== History ==
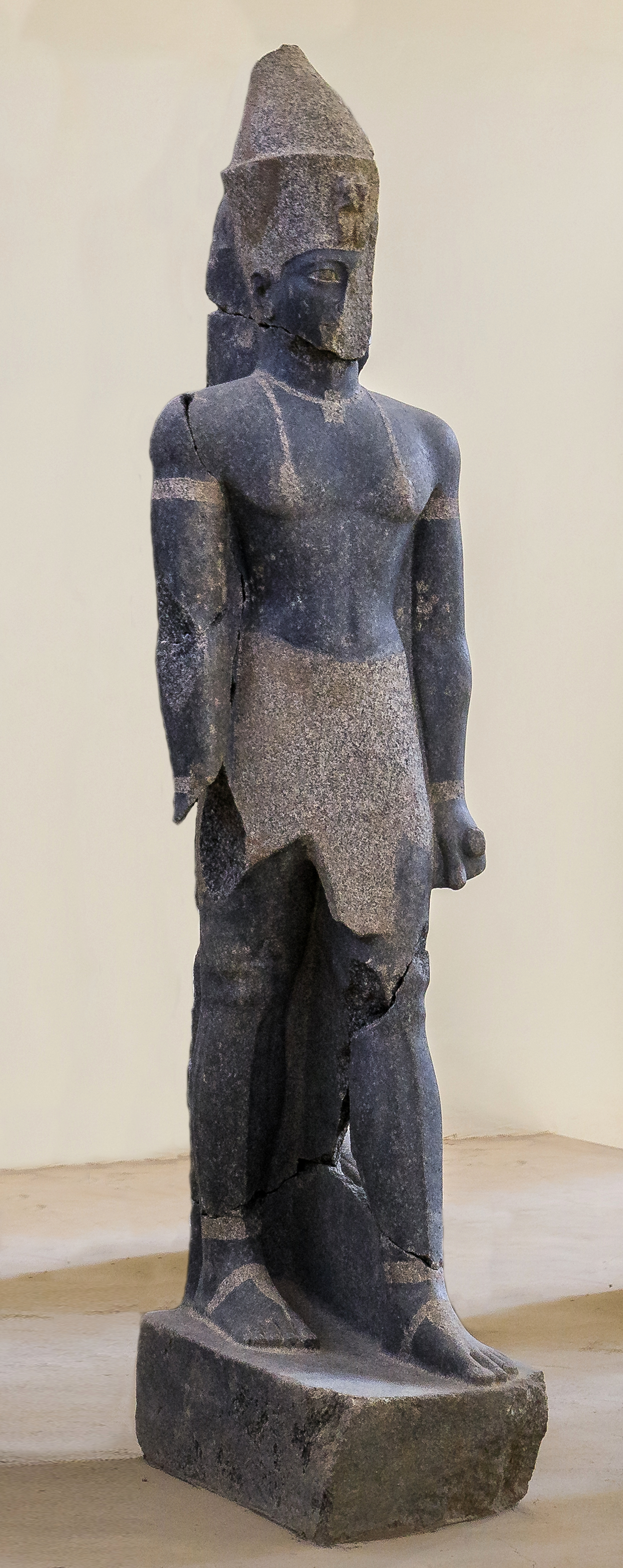
Kushite king Senkamanisken c. 643–623 BC. Kerma Museum

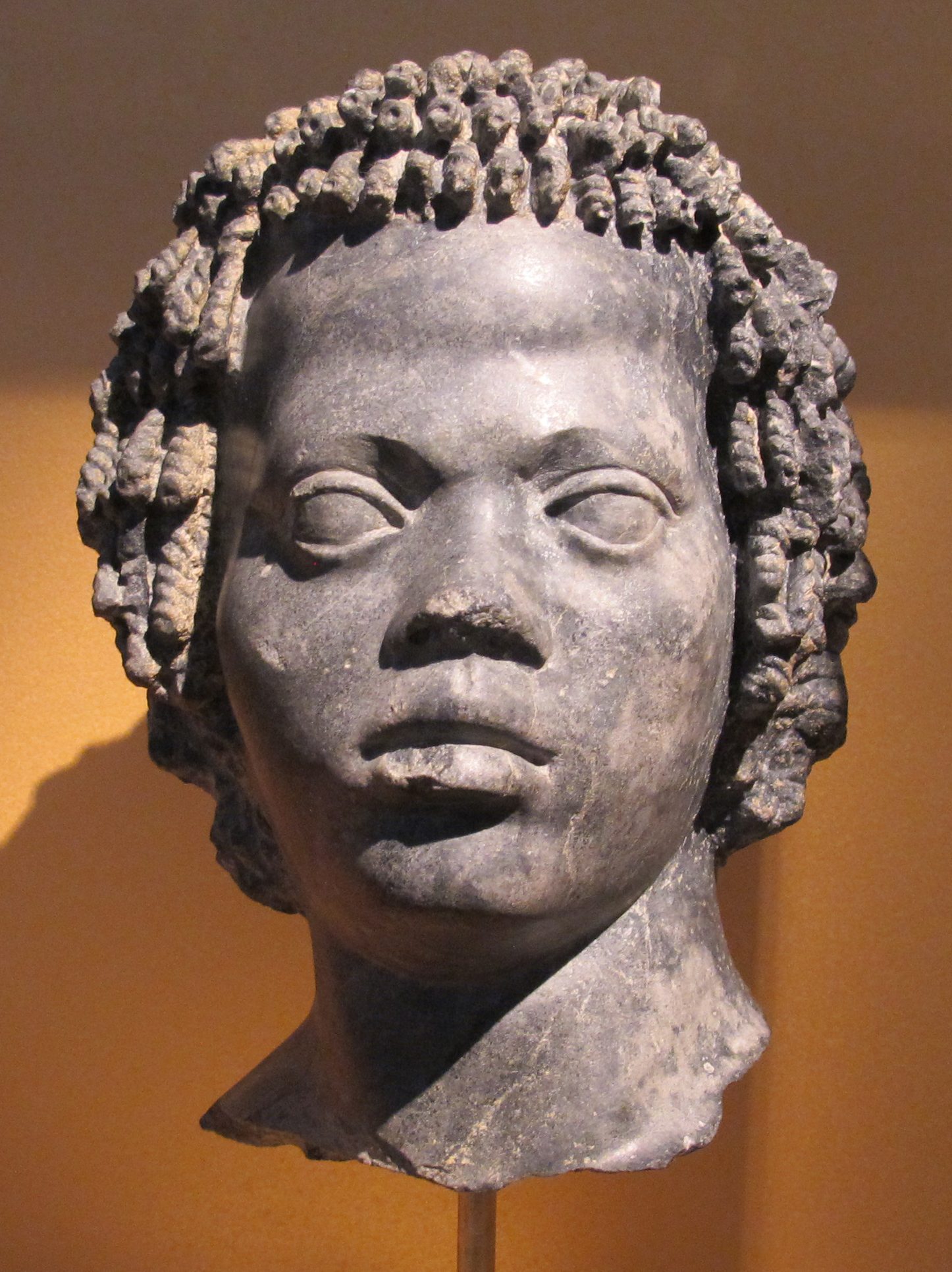
Marble portrait of a Nubia denizen c. 120–100 BC.

The prehistory of Nubia dates to the Paleolithic around 300,000 years ago. By about 6000 BC, peoples in the region had developed an agricultural economy. In their history, they adopted the Egyptian hieroglyphic system around 700 BC. Ancient history in Nubia is categorized according to the following periods: A-Group culture (3700–2800 BC), C-Group culture (2300–1600 BC), Kerma culture (2500–1500 BC), Nubian contemporaries of the New Kingdom (1550–1069 BC), the Twenty-fifth Dynasty (1000–653 BC), Napata (1000–275 BC), Meroë (275 BC–300/350 AD), Makuria (340–1317 AD), Nobatia (350–650 AD), Alodia (600s–1504 AD), and Dotawo (1180s-1500 AD).

In the view of Egyptian scholar and editor of UNESCO General History of Africa Volume II (1981), Gamal Mokhtar, Upper Egypt and Nubia held "similar ethnic composition" with comparable material culture. Mokhtar described a notable difference between the communities with Upper Egyptians having adopted a system of writing earlier due to the exigencies of the Nile Valley whilst their Nubian counterparts were more reticent due to their higher reliance on mobile stock-raising as an expressed feature of their economy.

Archaeological evidence has attested that population settlements occurred in Nubia as early as the Late Pleistocene era and from the 5th millennium BC onwards, whereas there is "no or scanty evidence" of human presence in the Egyptian Nile Valley during these periods, which may be due to problems in site preservation.

Archaeologist Bruce Williams has advanced the view that Nubian elites participated with the early Egyptian rulers in the development of the pharaonic civilization. Williams also clarified in 1987 that his discovery of the Qutsul incense burner proposed no claim of a Nubian origin or genesis for the pharaonic monarchy but that excavations had shown Nubian linkages and contributions. He maintained that detailed, archaeological evidence had found cemeteries of tombs situated in Qustul, Nubia which were described to be vastly wealthier and greater in size than the Abydos tombs of the first dynastic rulers.

Several scholars have argued that the African origins of the Egyptian civilisation derived from pastoral communities which emerged in both the Egyptian and Sudanese regions of the Nile Valley in the fifth millennium BCE.

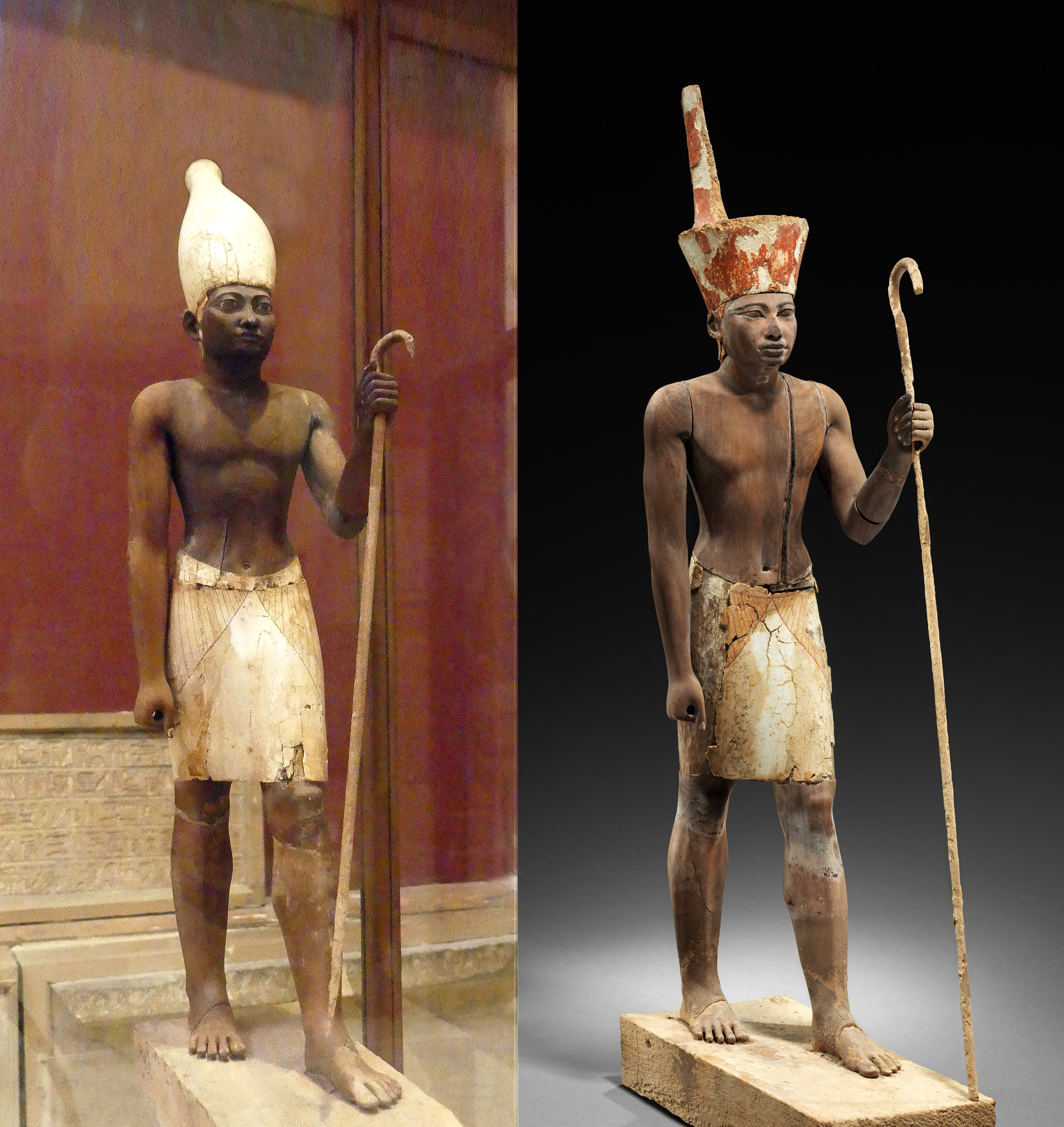
Pair of guardian statuettes, depicting Middle Kingdom pharaohs, presumably Senusret I or Amenemhat II, with the white crown of Upper Egypt (left), the other with the red crown of Lower Egypt. The 12th dynasty had origins in Ta-Seti, Upper Egypt/Lower Nubia.

Various biological anthropological studies have shown close, biological affinities between the predynastic southern, Egyptian and the early Nubian populations.

Frank Yurco (1996) remarked that depictions of pharaonic iconography such as the royal crowns, Horus falcons and victory scenes were concentrated in the Upper Egyptian Naqada culture and A-Group Lower Nubia. He further elaborated that "Egyptian writing arose in Naqadan Upper Egypt and A-Group Lower Nubia, and not in the Delta cultures, where the direct Western Asian contact was made, [which] further vitiates the Mesopotamian-influence argument".

In 2023, Christopher Ehret reported that the existing archaeological, linguistic, biological anthropological and genetic evidence had determined the founding populations of Ancient Egyptian areas such as Naqada and El-Badari to be the descendants of longtime inhabitants in Northeastern Africa which included Egypt, Nubia and the northern Horn of Africa.

The linguistic affinities of early Nubian cultures are uncertain. Some research has suggested that the early inhabitants of the Nubia region, during the C-Group and Kerma cultures, were speakers of languages belonging to the Berber and Cushitic branches, respectively, of the Afroasiatic family. More recent research instead suggests that the people of the Kerma culture spoke Nilo-Saharan languages of the Eastern Sudanic branch and that the peoples of the C-Group culture to their north spoke Cushitic languages. They were succeeded by the first Nubian language speakers, whose tongues belonged to another branch of Eastern Sudanic languages within the Nilo-Saharan phylum. A 4th-century AD victory stele commemorative of Axumite king Ezana contains inscriptions describing two distinct population groups dwelling in ancient Nubia: a "red" population and a "black" population.

Although Egypt and Nubia have a shared predynastic and pharaonic history, the two histories diverge with the fall of Ancient Egypt and the conquest of Egypt by Alexander the Great in 332 BC. At this point, the area of land between the 1st and the 6th cataract of the Nile became known as Nubia.

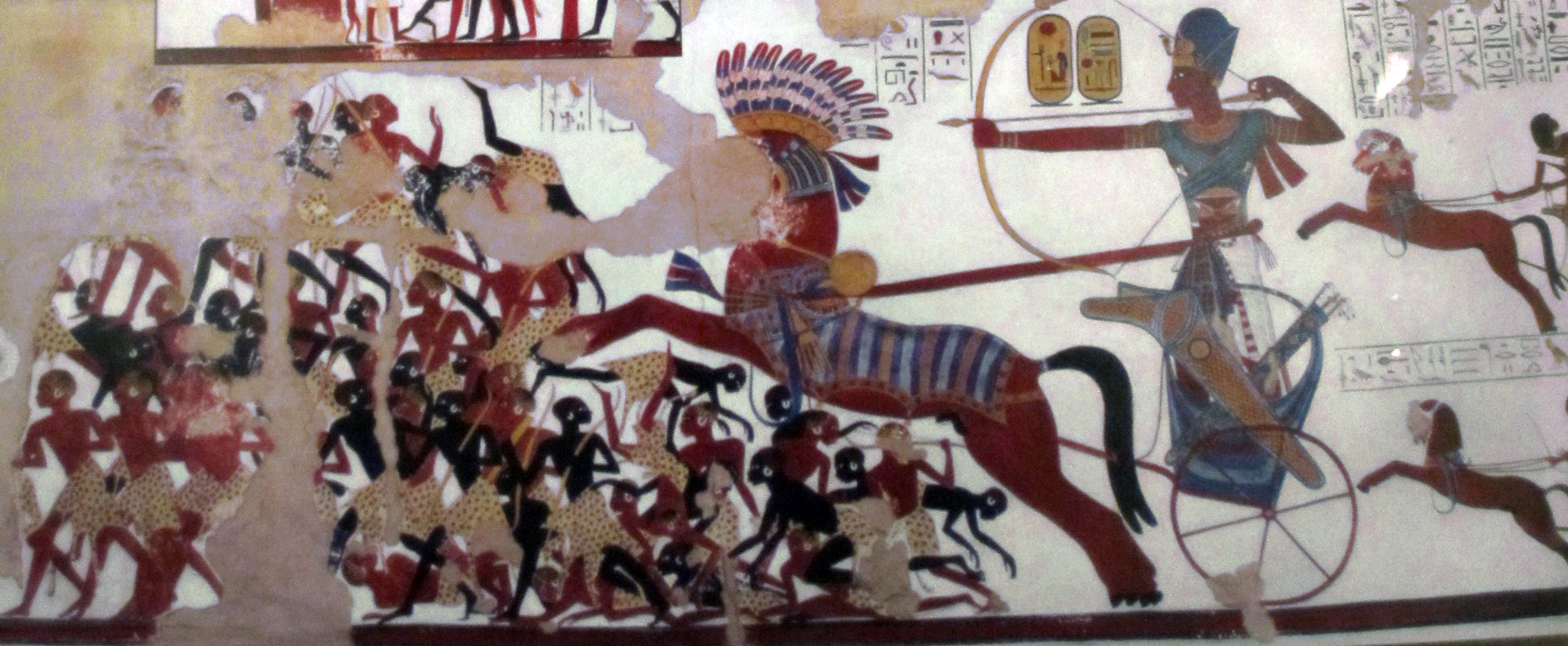
Ramesses II in his war chariot charging into battle against the Nubians. New Kingdom reliefs as seen in Rameses II temple, Beit el-Wali, represented Nubians with dark reddish brown and jet black skin tones.

Egypt was conquered first by the Persians and named the Satrapy (Province) of Mudriya, and two centuries later by the Greeks and then the Romans. During the latter period, however, the Kushites formed the kingdom of Meroë, which was ruled by a series of Kandakes or Queens. The Kandaka of Meroë was able to intimidate Alexander the Great into retreat with a great army of elephants, while historical documents suggest that the Nubians defeated the Roman Emperor Augustus Caesar, resulting in a favorable peace treaty for Meroë. The kingdom of Meroë also defeated the Persians, and later Christian Nubia defeated the invading Arab armies on three different occasions resulting in the 600 year peace treaty of Baqt, the longest lasting treaty in history. The fall of the kingdom of Christian Nubia occurred in the early 1500s resulting in Islamization and reunification with Egypt under the Ottoman Empire, the Muhammad Ali dynasty, and British colonial rule. After the 1956 independence of Sudan from Egypt, Nubia and the Nubian people became divided between Southern Egypt and Northern Sudan.

Modern Nubians speak Nubian languages, Eastern Sudanic languages that are part of the Nilo-Saharan family. The Old Nubian language is attested from the 8th century AD, and may be the oldest well-recorded language of Africa outside of the Afro-asiatic family, depending on the classification of Meroitic and the language of the Garamantes.

Nubia consisted of four regions with varied agriculture and landscapes. The Nile river and its valley were found in the north and central parts of Nubia, allowing farming using irrigation. The western Sudan had a mixture of peasant agriculture and nomadism. Eastern Sudan had primarily nomadism, with a few areas of irrigation and agriculture. Finally, there was the fertile pastoral region of the south, where Nubia's larger agricultural communities were located.

Nubia was dominated by kings from clans that controlled the gold mines. Trade in exotic goods from other parts of Africa (ivory, animal skins) passed to Egypt through Nubia.

== Language ==
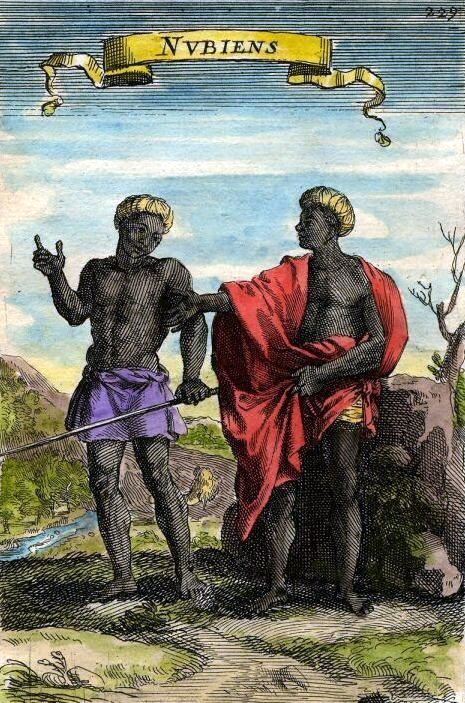
View of Nubians, 1683 (cropped)

Modern Nubians speak Nubian languages. They belong to the Eastern Sudanic branch of the Nilo-Saharan phylum. But there is some uncertainty regarding the classification of the languages spoken in Nubia in antiquity. There is some evidence that Cushitic languages were spoken in parts of Lower (northern) Nubia by the C-Group culture and the Pan-Grave culture the latter known as the Medjay

, and that Eastern Sudanic languages were spoken in Upper and Central Nubia, but the Early Kerma culture may have spoken a Cushitic language before the spread of Eastern Sudanic languages even further north into Lower Nubia.

Peter Behrens (1981) and Marianne Bechhaus-Gerst (2000) suggest that the ancient peoples of the C-Group and Kerma civilizations spoke Afroasiatic languages of the Berber and Cushitic branches, respectively. They propose that the Nilo-Saharan Nobiin language today contains a number of key pastoralism related loanwords that are of Berber or proto-Highland East Cushitic origin, including the terms for sheep/goatskin, hen/cock, livestock enclosure, butter and milk. This in turn, is interpreted to suggest that the C-Group and Kerma populations, who inhabited the Nile Valley immediately before the arrival of the first Nubian speakers, spoke Afroasiatic languages.

Claude Rilly (2010, 2016) and Julien Cooper (2017) on the other hand, suggest that the Kerma peoples (of Upper Nubia) spoke Nilo-Saharan languages of the Eastern Sudanic branch, possibly ancestral to the later Meroitic language, which Rilly also suggests was Nilo-Saharan. Rilly also considers evidence of significant early Afro-Asiatic influence, especially Berber, on Nobiin to be weak (and where present, more likely due to borrowed loanwords than substrata), and considers evidence of substratal influence on Nobiin from an earlier now extinct Eastern Sudanic language to be stronger. Julien Cooper (2017) suggests that Nilo-Saharan languages of the Eastern Sudan branch were spoken by the people of Kerma, those further south along the Nile, to the west, and those of Saï (an island to the north of Kerma), but that Afro-Asiatic (most likely Cushitic) languages were spoken by other peoples in Lower Nubia (such as the Medjay and the C-Group culture) living in Nubian regions north of Saï toward Egypt and those southeast of the Nile in Punt in the Eastern dessert. Based partly on an analysis of the phonology of place names and personal names from the relevant regions preserved in ancient texts, he argues that the terms from "Kush" and "Irem" (ancient names for Kerma and the region south of it respectively) in Egyptian texts display traits typical of Eastern Sudanic languages, while those from further north (in Lower Nubia) and east are more typical of the Afro-Asiatic family, noting: "The Irem-list also provides a similar inventory to Kush, placing this firmly in an Eastern Sudanic zone. These Irem/Kush-lists are distinctive from the Wawat-, Medjay-, Punt-, and Wetenet-lists, which provide sounds typical to Afroasiatic languages."

It is also uncertain to which language family the ancient Meroitic language is related. Kirsty Rowan suggests that Meroitic, like the Egyptian language, belongs to the Afroasiatic family. She bases this on its sound inventory and phonotactics, which, she argues, are similar to those of the Afroasiatic languages and dissimilar from those of the Nilo-Saharan languages. Claude Rilly proposes, based on its syntax, morphology, and known vocabulary, that Meroitic, like the Nobiin language, belongs to the Eastern Sudanic branch of the Nilo-Saharan family.

== Nubian Greeks ==
=== The Noba conquest of Kush and the Axumite capture of Meroe ===
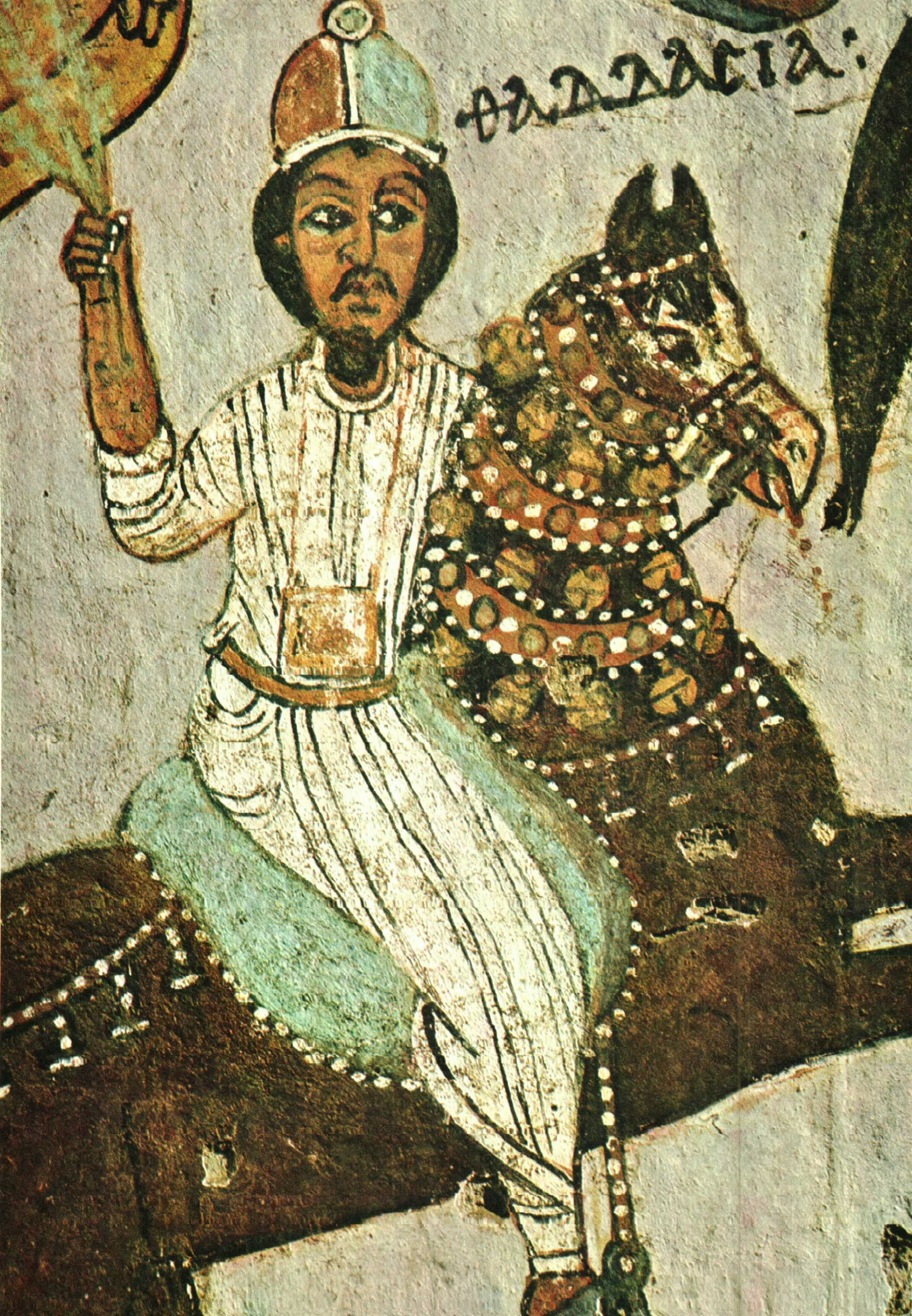
A Nubian Greek fresco in Faras

The Kingdom of Kush persisted as a major regional power until the fourth century AD, when it weakened and disintegrated amid worsening climatic conditions, internal rebellions, and foreign invasions—notably by the Noba people, who introduced the Nubian languages and gave their name to Nubia itself. While the Kushites were occupied by war with the Noba and the Blemmyes, the Aksumites took the opportunity to capture Meroë and loot its gold. Negus Ezana then took on the title of "King of Ethiopia," a practice which would last into the modern period and was recorded in inscriptions found in both Axum and Meroe. Although the Aksumite presence was likely short-lived, it prompted the dissolution of the Kushite kingdom into the three polities of Nobatia, Makuria and Alodia. The Kingdom of Alodia subsequently gained control of the southern territory of the former Meroitic empire, including parts of Eritrea. The Axumite Empire of Ethiopia engaged in a series of invasions that culminated in the capture of the Nubian capital of Meroë in the middle of the 4th century AD, signaling the end of independent Nubian Pagan kingdoms. The Axumites then sent missionaries to Nubia to establish similar Syrian-based Christianity like in Ethiopia, but were competing with Egyptian-based Christianity, who eventually established the authority of the Coptic Church in the area, and founded new Nubian Christian kingdoms, such as Nobatia, Alodia, and Makuria.

Tribal nomads like the Beja, Afar, and Saho managed to remain autonomous due to their uncentralized nomadic nature. These tribal peoples would sporadically inflict attacks and raids on Axumite communities. The Beja nomads eventually Hellenized and integrated into the Nubian Greek society that had already been present in Lower Nubia for three centuries.

=== Nubian Greek society ===
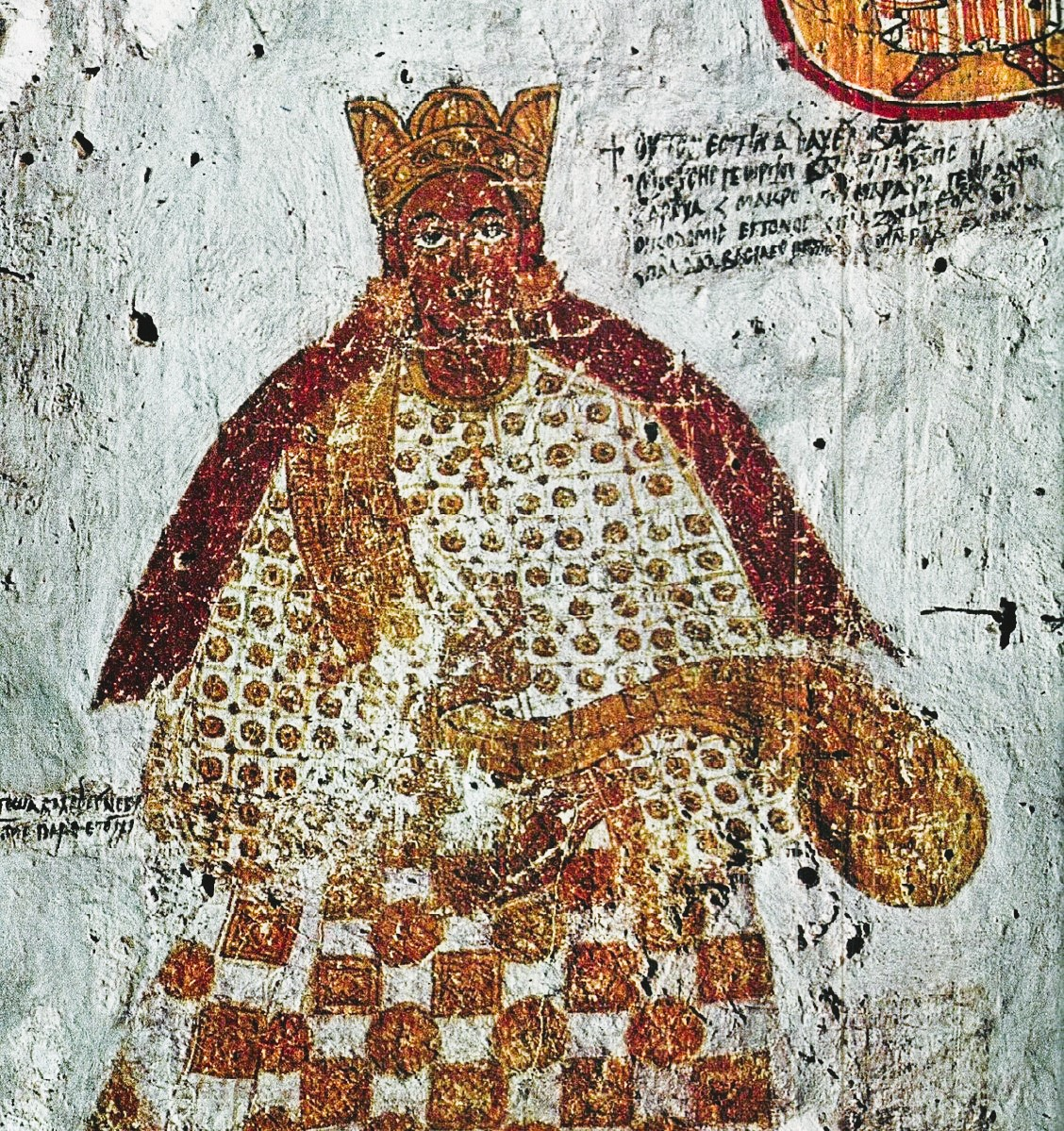
A queen mother of the Makurian kingdom, likely the mother of King Solomon

Nubian Greek culture followed the pattern of Egyptian Greek and Byzantine Greek civilization, expressed in Nubian Greek art and Nubian Greek literature. The earliest attestations of Nubian Greek literature come from the 5th century; the Nubian Greek language resembles Egyptian and Byzantine Greek; it served as a lingua franca throughout the Nubian Kingdoms, and had a creolized form for trade among the different peoples in Nubia.

Nubian Greek was unique in that it adopted many words from both Coptic Egyptian and Nubian; Nubian Greek's syntax also evolved to establish a fixed word order.

The following is an example of Nubian Greek language:

ⲟⲩⲧⲟⲥ ⲉⲥⲧⲓⲛ ⲁⲇⲁⲩⲉⲗ ⲃⲁⲥⲓⲗⲉⲩ ⲙⲱⲥⲉⲥ ⲅⲉⲱⲣⲅⲓⲟⲩ, ⲃⲁⲥⲓⲗⲉⲩ ⲛⲟⲩⲃⲇⲏⲥ, ⲁⲣⲟⲩⲁ, ⲙⲁⲕⲣⲟ

Οὗτός ἐστιν ἀδαύελ Βασιλεύ Μώσες Γεωργίου, Βασιλεύ Νουβδῆς, Ἀρουά, Μακρό

This is the great King Moses [son] of Georgios, the King of the Nobatians, Alodia, Makuria

A plethora of frescoes created between 800–1200 AD in Nubian cities such as Faras depicted religious life in the courts of the Nubian Kingdoms; they were made in Byzantine art style.

Nubian Greek titles and government styles in Nubian Kingdoms were based on Byzantine models; even with Islamic encroachments and influence into Nubian territory, the Nubian Greeks saw Constantinople as their spiritual home. Nubian Greek culture disappeared after the Muslim conquest of Nubia around 1450 AD.

== Modern Nubians ==
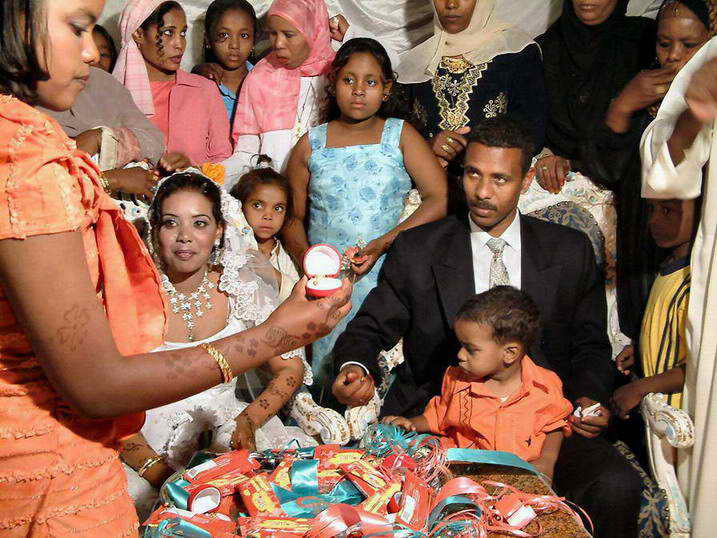
Nubian wedding near Aswan

The descendants of the ancient Nubians still inhabit the general area of what was ancient Nubia. They currently live in what is called Old Nubia, mainly located in modern Egypt and Sudan. Nubians have been resettled in large numbers (an estimated 50,000 people) away from Wadi Halfa North Sudan in to Khashm el Girba – Sudan and some moved to Southern Egypt since the 1960s, when the Aswan High Dam was built on the Nile, flooding ancestral lands. Most Nubians nowadays work in Egyptian and Sudanese cities. Whereas Arabic was once only learned by Nubian men who travelled for work, it is increasingly being learned by Nubian women who have access to school, radio and television. Nubian women are working outside the home in increasing numbers.

During the Yom Kippur War of 1973, Egypt employed Nubian people as Code talkers.

== Culture ==
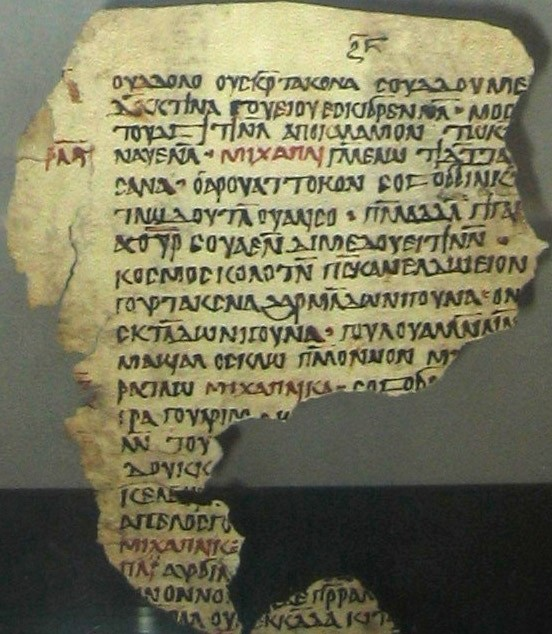
Old Nubian manuscript

Nubians have developed a common identity, which has been celebrated in poetry, novels, music, and storytelling.

Nubians in modern Sudan include the Halfawis from Wadi Halfa to the second cataract, the Mahas from the second cataract to the third cataract, and the Danagla from Dongola to Al Dabbah. These Nubians write using their own script and maintain ancient traditions such as Sebu, a birth ceremony. Scarification was once practiced by Nubian tribes; Mahas men and women had three scars on each cheek, while the Danagla would have these scars on their temples. However, younger generations have abandoned this custom.

Nubia's ancient cultural development was influenced by its geography. It is sometimes divided into Upper Nubia and Lower Nubia. Upper Nubia was where the ancient Kingdoms of Kush, Napata, and Meroe were located. Lower Nubia has been called "the corridor to Africa", where there was contact and cultural exchange between Nubians, Egyptians, Greeks, Assyrians, Romans, and Arabs. Lower Nubia was also where the Kingdoms of Nobadia and Makuria flourished. The languages spoken by modern Nubians are based on ancient Sudanic dialects. From north to south, they are: Kenuz, Fadicha (Matoki), Sukkot, Mahas, Danagla.

Kerma, Napata, and Meroe were Nubia's largest population centres in antiquity. The rich agricultural lands of Nubia supported these cities. Ancient Egyptian rulers sought control of Nubia's wealth, including gold, and the important trade routes within its territories. Nubia's trade links with Egypt led to Egypt's domination over Nubia during the New Kingdom period. The emergence of the Kingdom of Meroe in the 8th century BC led to Egypt being under the control of Nubian rulers for a century, although they preserved many Egyptian cultural traditions. Nubian kings were considered pious scholars and patrons of the arts, copying ancient Egyptian texts and even restoring some Egyptian cultural practices. After this, Egypt's influence declined greatly. Meroe became the centre of power for Nubia and cultural links with other parts of Africa gained greater influence.

=== Religion ===
Today, Nubians practice Islam. To a certain degree, Nubian religious practices involve a syncretism of Islam and traditional folk beliefs. In ancient times, Nubians practiced a mixture of Kushite religion and Egyptian religion. Prior to the spread of Islam, many Nubians practiced Christianity.

Beginning in the eighth century, Islam arrived in Nubia. Though Christians and Muslims (primarily Arab merchants at this period) may have lived peacefully together, Arab armies often invaded Christian Nubian kingdoms. An example of this being Makuria, where in 651 the Rashidun Caliphate invaded, but was repulsed twice, and a treaty known as the Baqt was signed, preventing further Arab invasions in exchange for 360 slaves each year. The Baqt required Nubians to maintain a mosque for Muslim visitors and residents.This, along with the subsequent Ottoman occupation of Lower Nubia in the 1560s, contributed to the decline of the kingdom and the transformation of Christian Nubian society. The former Makurian territories south of the 3rd cataract, including the former capital Old Dongola, had been annexed by the Islamic Funj Sultanate by the early 16th. Over time, the Nubians gradually converted to Islam, beginning with the Nubian elite. Islam was mainly spread by Sufi preachers who settled in Nubia from the late 14th century onwards. By the sixteenth century, most Nubians had converted to Islam.

Ancient Napata was an important religious centre in Nubia. It was the location of Jebel Barkal, a massive sandstone hill resembling a rearing cobra in the eyes of the ancient inhabitants. Egyptian priests declared it to be the home of the ancient deity Amun, further enhancing Napata as an ancient religious site. This was the case for both Egyptians and Nubians. Egyptian and Nubian deities alike were worshipped in Nubia for 2,500 years, even while Nubia was under the control of the New Kingdom of Egypt. Nubian kings and queens were buried near Jebel Barkal, in pyramids as the Egyptian pharaohs were. Nubian pyramids were built at Jebel Barkal, at Nuri (across the Nile from Jebel Barkal), at El Kerru, and at Meroe, south of Jebel Barkal.

== Architecture ==
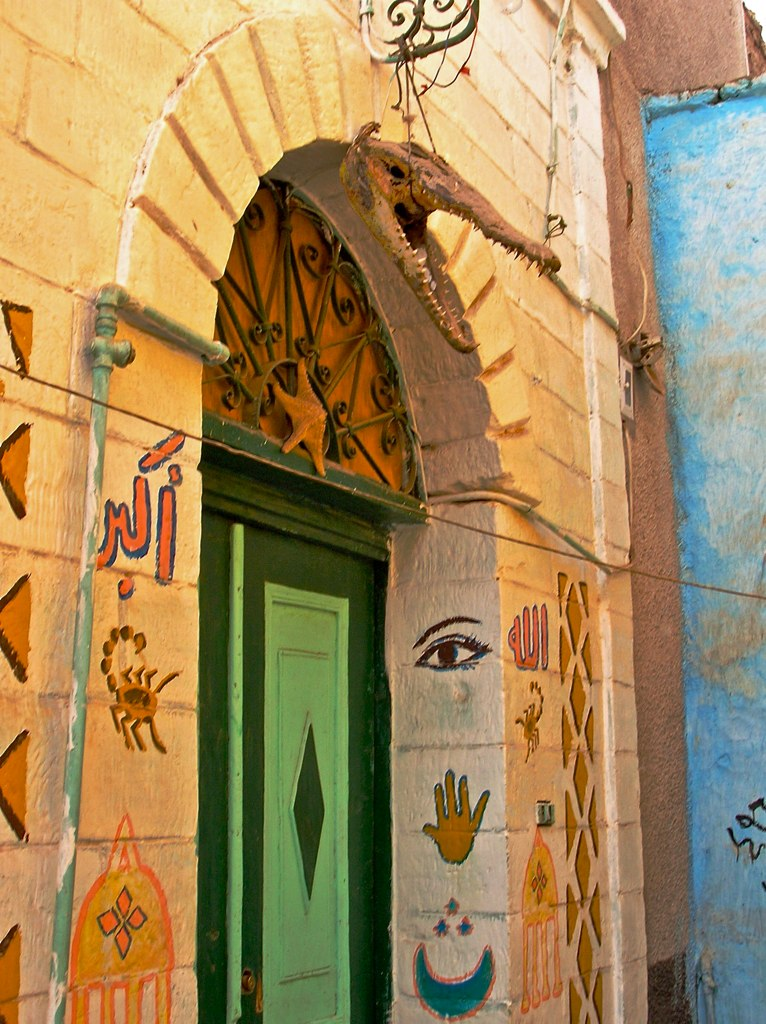
Nubian house in Aswan, Egypt.

Modern Nubian architecture in Sudan is distinctive, and typically features a large courtyard surrounded by a high wall. A large, ornately decorated gate, preferably facing the Nile, dominates the property. Brightly colored stucco is often decorated with symbols connected with the family inside, or popular motifs such as geometric patterns, palm trees, or the evil eye that wards away bad luck.

Nubians invented the Nubian vault, a type of curved surface forming a vaulted structure.

== Genetics ==
Autosomal DNA has been extensively studied in recent years, and some of the findings are as follows:

- Babiker, H. M., Schlebusch, C. M., Hassan, H. Y., et al. (2011) revealed that individuals from northern Sudan clustered with those from Egypt, while individuals from South Sudan clustered with those from Karamoja (Uganda). They conclude that "the similarity of the Nubian and Egyptian populations suggest that migration, potentially bidirectional, occurred along the Nile river Valley, which is consistent with the historical evidence for long-term interactions between Egypt and Nubia.
- Dobon et al. (2015) identified an ancestral autosomal component of West Eurasian origin that is common to many Sudanese Arabs, Nubians and Afroasiatic-speaking populations in the region. Nubians were found to be genetically modelled similar to their Cushitic and Semitic (Afro-Asiatic) neighbors (such as the Beja, Sudanese Arabs, and Ethiopians) rather than to other Nilo-Saharan speakers who lack this Middle Eastern/North African influence. The study showed that these populations formed a "North-East cluster", which included Northern Sudanese. This may be explained by the aforementioned groups being a mixture of a population similar to Modern Coptic Egyptians, and an ancestral Southern African one.

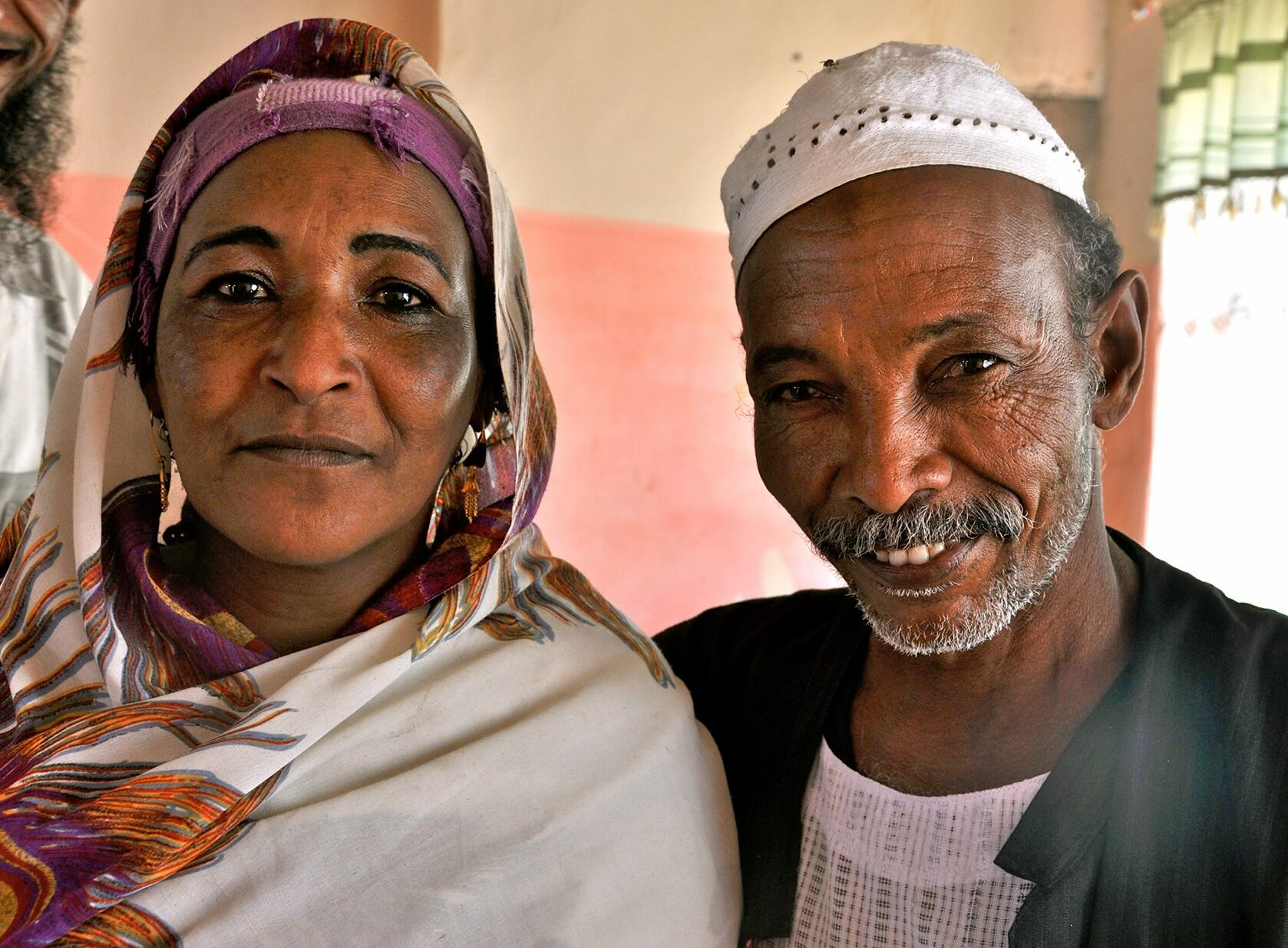
Nubians in Sudan

- Hollfelder et al. (2017) analysed various populations in Sudan and observed close autosomal affinities between their Nubian and Sudanese Arab samples. The authors concluded that the "Nubians can be seen as a group with substantial genetic material relating to Nilotes that later received much gene-flow from Eurasians and East Africans. The strongest admixture came from Eurasian populations and was likely quite extensive: 39.41%–47.73%." The study also showed "almost no West African component or, at a higher K, Bantu component".
- In 2018, Carina M. Schlebusch and Mattias Jakobsson in the Annual Review of Genomics and Human Genetics, found that Nilotic populations from South Sudan (e.g. Dinka, Nuer and Shilluk) remained isolated and received little to no geneflow from Eurasians, West African Bantu-speaking farmers, and other surrounding groups. In contrast, Nubians and Arabs in the north showed admixture from Western Eurasian populations. The population structure analysis and inferred ancestry showed that "the Nubian, Arab, and Beja populations of northeastern Africa roughly display equal admixture fractions from a local northeastern African gene pool (similar to the Nilotic component) and an incoming Eurasian migrant component."
- Bird, Nancy et al. (2023) discovered that, in contrast to other African groups which saw strong correlation between genetics, ethnicity and geography, the genetic patterns of variation among Sudanese Arabs, Nubians, and Beja, showed no correspondence with ethnicity. All these communities had individuals who fell into two main clusters: Sudan Nile 1 and Sudan Nile 2, with the first showing a maximum of 12% inferred Arabian-related ancestry, and the second upwards of 48%. The main difference between the pooled clusters was the proportion of the component related to Saudi Arabia, with less of such ancestry more commonly seen in the Nubians and Beja on average.
- Vilà-Valls, Laura et al. (2026) described Sudan as a mosaic from a set of 125 Sudanese individuals (25 Copts, 25 Beja, 25 Mahas, 25 Fur, 25 Fulani) at high coverage using whole-genome-sequencing (WGS). The Mahas Nubians included were considered an ancient Nile Valley population with ties to both Egypt, as well as inner Africa. Specifically, carrying autochthonous Cushitic and Nilotic-related ancestries, and contributions introduced from Egyptian and Arabic sources. In haplotype clustering, they grouped with the Copts and Beja, being distinguished from the Fur of Darfur, as well as the Fulani.

=== Y-DNA ===
A 2003 study by Lucotte and Mercier analyzed Y-chromosome haplogroups among 274 unrelated males in Egypt. Included in the study were Lower Nubian populations from Abu Simbel, with the individuals originating from this locality self-identified as Nubians. The research focused on using the p49a,f/TaqI haplotype polymorphisms, which can be linked to modern phylogenetic classifications. Samples from these 46 Nubians revealed the following Y-Chromosome Haplogroups (genetic composition):

- E1b1b (E-M35): 86.9% of the population, represented by three haplotypes: - Haplotype IV: 39.1% - Haplotype V: 17.4% - Haplotype XI: 30.4%
- J1 (Haplotype VIII): 2.2%.
- J2 (Haplotype VII): 2.2%
- Other lineages were XIII at 2.2%, III at 4.3% and XVI at 2.2%

In 2008 results of an analysis by Hisham Y. Hassan of modern Sudanese entitled Chromosome Variation Among Sudanese: Restricted Gene Flow, Concordance With Language, Geography, and History included 39 Nubians found to be of the following Y Chromosome Haplogroups:

- J1 41%
- J2 2%
- E3b1 (E-M78) 15.3%
- E3 (E-M215) 7.6%
- R1b 10.3%
- B-M60 7.7%
- F 10.2%
- I 5.1%

=== Christian-Era DNA ===
Sirak et al. (2015) analysed the DNA of a Christian-period inhabitant of Kulubnarti in northern Nubia near the Egyptian border. They found that this individual was most closely related to Middle Eastern populations. Further excavations of two Early Christian period (AD 550–800) cemeteries at Kulubnarti, one located on the mainland and the other on an island, revealed the existence of two ancestrally and socioeconomically distinct local populations. Preliminary results, including mitochondrial haplogroup analysis, suggests there may be substantial differences in the genetic composition between the two communities, with 70% of individuals from the island cemetery demonstrating African-based haplogroups (L2, L1, and L5), compared to only 36.4% of mainlanders, who instead show an increased prevalence of European and Near Eastern haplogroups (including K1, H, I5, and U1).

Sirak et al. (2021) obtained and analyzed the whole genomes of 66 individuals from the site of Kulubnarti situated between the 2nd and 3rd cataract and dated to the Christian period between 650 and 1000 CE. The samples were obtained from two cemeteries, R and S. Grave materials between the two cemeteries did not differ, but physical analyses of the remains found differences in morbidity and mortality indicating that the R cemetery individuals were of a higher social class than the cemetery S individuals. The study analyzed the data they obtained along with other published ancient and modern samples from Africa and West Eurasia. The genetic profile of the sampled Christian-era Nubians was found to be a mixture between West Eurasian and Sub Saharan Dinka-related ancestries. The samples were estimated to have approximately 60% West Eurasian related ancestry that likely came from ancient Egyptians but ultimately resembles that found in Bronze or Iron Age Levantines. They also carried approximately 40% Dinka-related ancestry. The study commented that the results reflect deep biological connections among the populations of the Nile Valley and further confirm the presence of West Eurasian ancestry in the Nile valley prior to Arab migrations.

The two cemeteries showed minimal differences in their West Eurasian/Dinka ancestry proportions, formed a genetic clade with each other in relation to other populations, and had a small FST value of 0.0013 reflecting a small genetic distance. These findings in addition to multiple cross cemetery relatives that the analyses have revealed indicate that people of both the R and S cemeteries were part of the same population despite the archaeological and anthropological differences between the two burials showing social stratification.

The study found some difference in Y haplogroups profiles between the two cemeteries with the S cemetery having more west Asian clades. the difference was found to be insignificant, and the study viewed it as likely to be a statistical fluctuation and not evidence of heterogeneity among males from the two cemeteries.

Regarding modern Nubians in Sudan, despite their superficial resemblance to the Kulubnarti Nubians on the PCA, they were not found to be descended directly from Kulubnarti Nubians without additional admixture following the Christian period.

== Notable Nubians ==
- Luqman, ancient wise man in Islamic tradition
- Mentuhotep II (possibly), sixth ruler of the Eleventh Dynasty; united Egypt and established the Middle Kingdom of Egypt
- Amenemhat I, founder of the Twelfth Dynasty
- Alara of Kush, founder of the Twenty-fifth Dynasty of Egypt
- Taharqa, Pharaoh of the Twenty-fifth Dynasty
- Amanirenas, Kandake of Kush, known for invading Roman-occupied Egypt.
- Amanitore, Kandake of the Kingdom of Kush
- Silko, 6th-century king of the Noubades and all of the Aethiopians
- Qalidurut, 7th-century king of Makuria
- Merkourios, 8th-century king of Dotawo
- Kyriakos of Makuria, 8th-century king of Makuria
- Abu al-Misk Kafur, vizier of Ikhshidid Egypt
- Rafael of Makuria, 10th-century Nubian king of Makuria
- al-Mustansir Billah, caliph of the Fatimid Caliphate
- Salomo of Makuria, 11th-century king of Dotawo
- Georgios I of Makuria, king of Makuria
- Moses Georgios of Makuria, 12th-century king
- Muhammad Ahmad, 19th-century Sufi sheikh and revolutionary leader
- Abdallah Khalil, ex-Sudanese prime minister
- Jaafar Nimeiry, former Sudanese president
- Khalil Farah, 20th-century Sudanese Nubian musician
- Hamza El Din, singer and musicologist
- Mohammed Wardi, Sudanese Nubian singer
- Ali Hassan Kuban, singer
- Ahmed Mounib, singer
- Mohamed Mounir, Egyptian Nubian singer
- Khalil Kalfat, literary critic, political and economic thinker, and writer
- Fathi Hassan, painter
- Mohamed Hussein Tantawi Soliman, Egyptian field marshal and statesman
- Mo Ibrahim, Sudanese-British entrepreneur and billionaire
- Osama Abdul Latif, Sudanese businessman
- Idris Ali, Egyptian novelist and short story writer
- Mohamed Homos, footballer
- Taha Abdelmagid, Paralympic powerlifter
- Kamil Idris, the 16th prime minister of Sudan
- Haissem Hassan, footballer

== See also ==
- Afro-Arabs refers to communities with mixed Sub-Saharan and Arab ancestry.
- Barabra is an old ethnographical term for the Nubian peoples of Sudan and southern Egypt.
- Nubian wig worn by the affluent society of ancient Egypt
- Aethiopia is an ancient Greek geographical term which referred to the regions of Sudan and areas south of the Sahara desert.
