= Karko people =

Sub-ethnic group in southern Sudan

Karko
Languages
- Karko, Sudanese Arabic

Religion
- Sunni Islam

Related ethnic groups
- Other Nuba people

The Karko are a sub-ethnic group of the Nuba peoples in the Nuba Mountains of South Kordofan state, in southern Sudan.

They speak Karko, a Hill Nubian language (Sample: "Ambapo ni kitabu chako?" - "Where is your book?").

Most members of this ethnicity are Muslims.

== Notable people ==
- Mende Nazer a Karko Nuban girl who was kidnapped into slavery but escaped and wrote a book about her ordeals.

== See also ==
- Index: Nuba peoples
