= Dilling people =

Ethnic group in Sudan

The Dilling are an ethnic group of the Nuba peoples. The Dilling numbered 11,000 in 2011 and live mainly in the Nuba Mountains of South Kordofan state, in southern Sudan, being part of the Hill Nubians.

== Language ==
The Dilling language is one of the Nubian languages of the Nilo-Saharan family.

== Lifestyle ==
Most of Dilling are farmers, Farming sorghum, cotton, and peanuts in the southern Nuba Mountains.They are predominately Muslim.

== See also ==
- Nuba peoples
