= Wali language (Sudan) =

Nubian language of Sudan

Wali
- Walari
- Native to: Sudan
- Region: Nuba Mountains
- Native speakers: 9,000 (2007)
- Language family: Nilo-Saharan?: Eastern Sudanic; Northern Eastern; Nubian; Central; Hill; (Unclassified); Wali

Language codes
- ISO 639-3: wll
- Glottolog: wali1262
- ELP: Wali
- Wali is classified as Critically Endangered by the UNESCO Atlas of the World's Languages in Danger.

Wali (also Walari, Walarishe, Wele) is a Hill Nubian language spoken in the northwestern Nuba Mountains in the south of Sudan. It is spoken by around 9,000 people 12 km northeast of Katla. Ethnologue reports that use of Wali is vigorous and that there are many monolingual speakers. Young children speak English and Wali, but it is expected that the next generation will continue to communicate using Wali.
