= Karko language (Sudan) =

Hill Nubian language of Sudan

Karko
- Kakenbi
- Native to: Sudan
- Region: Nuba Mountains
- Native speakers: 15,000 (2013)
- Language family: Nilo-Saharan?: Eastern Sudanic; Northern Eastern; Nubian; Central; Hill; (Unclassified); Karko
- Dialects: Karko; Kasha; Shifir
- Writing system: Latin

Language codes
- ISO 639-3: kko
- Glottolog: kark1256
- ELP: Karko (Sudan)
- Karko is classified as Definitely Endangered by the UNESCO Atlas of the World's Languages in Danger.

Karko (also Garko, Kaak, Karme, Kithonirishe; autonym: Kakenbi) is a Hill Nubian language spoken in the northwestern Nuba Mountains in the south of Sudan. It is spoken by around 7,000 people in the Karko hills, 35 km west of Dilling, including Dulman, although Jakobi Angelika & Hamdan Ahma estimate the Karko population at up to 15,000 individuals, mostly in urban centers. Ethnologue reports that speakers of Karko are shifting to Sudanese Arabic.

The language is referred to in Karko as "Kàâŋg" or "káákmbἑἑ", which means "Karko ́s language". They also write that "Karko is part of Kordofan Nubian, a group of closely related languages which are also known as Hill Nubian" and descend from the Nubian language family.

== Dialects ==
Karko has three dialects: Karko, Kasha and Shifir. Additionally, varieties spoken by the Ilaki on Abu Junuk to the west (by 1,000 people) and by the Tamang at El Tabaq southwest of Katla (by 800 people) may be dialects or separate languages.

== Vowels ==
According to Angelika and Ahmad, the vowel system of Karko is "characterized by the distinction of eight vowel qualities. Except for the mid-central vowel /ǝ/, which is attested as short vowel only, all other vowels appear both short and long."
