= Kadaru people =

Sub-ethnic group of the Nuba peoples in Sudan

The Kadaru are a sub-ethnic group of the Nuba peoples in the Nuba Mountains of South Kordofan state, in southern Sudan. They live in the Kadaru Hills between Dilling and Delami in South Kurdufan.

They speak Kadaru language, a language of the Nubian branch of the Nilo-Saharan family.

== See also ==
- Index: Nuba peoples
