= El Hugeirat language =

Hill Nubian language of Sudan

El Hugeirat
- El Hagarat
- Native to: Sudan
- Region: Nuba Mountains
- Ethnicity: El Hugeirat people
- Native speakers: 50 (2007)
- Language family: Nilo-Saharan?: Eastern Sudanic; Northern Eastern; Nubian; Central; Hill; (Unclassified); El Hugeirat

Language codes
- ISO 639-3: elh
- Glottolog: elhu1238
- ELP: El Hugeirat
- El Hugeirat is classified as Severely Endangered by the UNESCO Atlas of the World's Languages in Danger.

El Hugeirat (also El Hagarat) is a moribund Hill Nubian language spoken in the northern Nuba Mountains of southern Sudan. It is spoken by approximately 50 people in a few families within the El Hugeirat hills, specifically in the villages of Sija, Bija, Shenishen, and Baboy.
