= Haraza language =

Extinct Hill Nubian language of Sudan

Haraza
- Native to: Sudan
- Extinct: late 19th century
- Language family: Nilo-Saharan?: Eastern Sudanic; Northern Eastern; Nubian; Central; Hill; Haraza

Language codes
- ISO 639-3: None (mis)
- Glottolog: hara1258

Haraza is an extinct Hill Nubian language known only from a few dozen words recalled by village elders in 1923. It was spoken in the Jebel Haraza near Hamrat el-Wuz (Rilly 2010:166).
