= Wali language =

Wali may be:

- Wali language (Sudan), a Nubian language
- Wali language (Ghana), a Gur language
