= Ghulfan language =

Hill Nubian language of Sudan

Ghulfan
- Uncunwee
- Native to: Sudan
- Region: Nuba Mountains
- Ethnicity: Ghulfan
- Native speakers: 40,000 (2022)
- Language family: Nilo-Saharan?: Eastern Sudanic; Northern Eastern; Nubian; Central; Hill; Kadaru–Ghulfan; Ghulfan

Language codes
- ISO 639-3: ghl
- Glottolog: ghul1238
- ELP: Uncunwee

Ghulfan (also Gulfan, Uncu, Uncunwee, Wunci, Wuncimbe) is a Hill Nubian language spoken in the central Nuba Mountains in the south of Sudan. It is spoken by around 40,000 people in the Ghulfan Kurgul and Ghulfan Morung hills, south of Dilling. The villages in which the language is spoken are Dabri, Karkandi, Katang, Kurgul, Namang, Ninya, Moring, Ota, Shigda, and Tarda. It is closely related to Kadaru, with which it forms the Kadaru-Ghulfan subgroup of Hill Nubian.

Ethnologue reports that the use of Ghulfan is decreasing as younger speakers switch to Sudanese Arabic with only adults speaking the language now and that there are no monolingual speakers of the language.

== Phonology ==
=== Consonants ===
		Labial	Alveolar	Retroflex	Post-alv./ Palatal	Velar
Nasal		m	n		ɲ	ŋ
Plosive/ Affricate	voiceless		t	ʈ	tʃ	k
Plosive/ Affricate	voiced	b	d	ɖ	dʒ	ɡ
Fricative					ʃ	
Lateral			l			
Rhotic			r	ɽ		
Approximant		w			j	

=== Vowels ===
	Front	Central	Back
Close	i iː		u uː
Near-close	ɪ		ʊ
Close-mid	e eː		o oː
Open-mid	ɛ		ɔ
Open		a aː	
