= Hill Nubian languages =

Group or dialect continuum of Nubian languages

Hill Nubian
- Kordofan Nubian
- Native to: Sudan
- Region: Nuba Hills
- Ethnicity: Hill Nubians
- Native speakers: (100,000 cited 1978–2022)
- Language family: Nilo-Saharan?: Eastern Sudanic; Northern Eastern; Nubian; Central; Hill Nubian
- Dialects: Kadaru-Ghulfan; Dair; Dilling; El Hugeirat; Karko; Wali

Language codes
- ISO 639-3: Variously: ghl – Ghulfan kdu – Kadaru kko – Karko wll – Wali dil – Dilling drb – Dair elh – El Hugeirat
- Glottolog: kord1246

The Hill Nubian languages, also called Kordofan Nubian, are a dialect continuum of Nubian languages spoken by the Hill Nubians in the northern Nuba Mountains of Sudan.

== Classification ==
The Hill Nubian languages are generally classified as being in the Central branch of the Nubian languages, one of three branches of the Nubian languages, the other two being Northern (Nile), consisting of Nobiin, and Western (Darfur), consisting of Midob. They are grouped together with Kenzi-Dongolawi (not seen to be closely related to Nobiin, despite their proximity) and Birgid, a language of southwestern Sudan extinct since the 1970s. Nubian lies within the Eastern Sudanic family, which is part of the Nilo-Saharan phylum.

== Languages ==
There are seven Hill Nubian languages, according to Ethnologue and Glottolog. Some of the languages have dialects. Their internal classification within Hill Nubian is not well established. Glottolog classifies Hill Nubian (Kordofan Nubian) into two branches: Eastern Kordofan Nubian and Western Kordofan Nubian, containing three and four languages respectively. Ethnologue, however, only groups Kadaru and Ghulfan together, leaving the rest unclassified within Hill Nubian, as follows:

- Kadaru-Ghulfan
  - Ghulfan (also Gulfan, Uncu, Uncunwee, Wunci, Wuncimbe) – 33,000 speakers
  - Kadaru (also Kadaro, Kadero, Kaderu, Kodhin, Kodhinniai, Kodoro, Tamya) – 25,000 speakers
- Dair (also Dabab, Daier, Thaminyi, Kuliniri) – 1,024 speakers
- Dilling (also Delen, Warkimbe, Warki) – 11,000 speakers
- El Hugeirat (also El Hagarat) – 50 speakers
- Karko (also Garko, Kaak, Karme, Kithonirishe, Kakenbi) – 7,000 speakers
- Wali (also Walari, Walarishe, Wele) – 9,000 speakers

Additionally, one extinct language known only from a word list of 36 words, Haraza, is unclassified within Hill Nubian.

List of Kordofan Nubian (Hill Nubian) language varieties according to Rilly (2010:164-165):

Language variety	Speakers	Distribution
Dair (Thaminyi)	1,000	Jebel ed-Dair, an isolated escarpment in the northeastern Nuba Mountains
Tagle (Taglena, Kororo, Kururu)		Jebel Kururu, in the Kadaro Massif
Kadaro (Kadero, Kadaru, Kodoro, Kodhin, Kodhinniai)	6,000	Kadaro Massif
Koldegi		south of the Kadaro Massif
Dabatna (Kaalu)		Jebel Dabatna, located to the southwest of the Kadaro Massif
Habila		Jebel Habila, an isolated hill between Dilling and the Kadaro Massif
Ghulfan (Gulfan, Wunci, Wuncimbe)	16,384	Ghulfan Massif; Kurgul dialect in the east, and Morung dialect in the west
Debri (Wei)		Jebel Debri, located south of the Ghulfan Massif
Kudur (Kwashi)		Jebel Kudur, an isolated hill north of Dilling
Dilling (Deleny, Deleñ, Warki)	5,300	Dilling and surroundings
Kasha (Kenimbe)		Jebel Kasha, an isolated hill north of Dilling
Karko (Garko, Kargo, Kithonirishe)	13,000	Karko Massif, located west of Dilling; dialects are Dulman and Kundukur
Fanda		Jebel Fanda, south of the Karko Massif
Kujuria (Kunak)		Kunit or Kujuria Hills, located southwest of the Karko Massif
Wali (Walari, Walarishe)	1,024	Wali Massif, located southwest of Dilling
Tabag		Jebel Tabag, an isolated massif in the western Nuba Mountains
Abu-Jinuk		Jebel Abu Jinuk, an isolated massif in the western Nuba Mountains
El-Hugeirat	1,024	far western Nuba Mountains

== See also ==
- Languages of the Nuba Mountains
- List of Northern Eastern Sudanic reconstructions (Wiktionary)
