= Dilling language =

Moribund Nubian language of Sudan

Dilling
- Warki
- Native to: Sudan
- Region: Nuba Hills
- Ethnicity: 92,000 Dilling (2024)
- Native speakers: 13,000 (2022)
- Language family: Nilo-Saharan?: Eastern Sudanic; Northern Eastern; Nubian; Central; Hill; (Unclassified); Dilling
- Writing system: Latin

Language codes
- ISO 639-3: dil
- Glottolog: dill1242
- ELP: Dilling
- Dilling is classified as Definitely Endangered by the UNESCO Atlas of the World's Languages in Danger.

Dilling (also Delen, Warkimbe; autonym: Warki) is a Hill Nubian language spoken in the northwestern Nuba Mountains in the south of Sudan. It is spoken by around 12,000 people in the town of Dilling and surrounding hills, including Kudur. Ethnologue reports that Dilling is moribund, with only older adults speaking the language and not using it with their children. All speakers also use Sudanese Arabic. The Dilling call themselves Warki, while the Dilling speakers of Kudur call themselves Kwashe. Another ethnic minority that speak Dilling are the Debri people, an ethnic group of several thousand people from South Kordofan in Sudan.

== Dialects ==
Dilling has one dialect – Debri, which is spoken on the mountain Gebel Debri, south of Ghulfan.

== Phonology ==
=== Consonants ===
Dilling has 21 consonants:

Consonant phonemes
	Bilabial		Labio- dental		Alveolar		Palatal		Velar		Uvular	Glottal
Plosive	p	b			t	d	c	ɟ	k	ɡ		
Fricative			f	v	(s)		ç	ʝ				h
Nasal		m				n		ɲ		ŋ	ɴ	
Approximant						ɹ						
Lateral approximant						l						

=== Vowels ===
Kauczor's 1920 orthography for Dilling lists nine vowels: a, e, ẹ, e̬, i, o, ọ, o̬, and u. The vowels a, e, i, o, and u correspond to their modern IPA definitions. ẹ and e̬ are described by Kauczor as falling between [e] and [i]; likewise, ọ and o̬ fall between [o] and [u]. These may correspond to the modern lax vowels; Kauczor notes that these four vowels are highly variable and affected by their phonological context.

Monophthong phonemes
	Front	Central	Back
	unrounded	unrounded	rounded
Close	i		u
Near-close	ɪ		ʊ
Close-mid	e		o
Open-mid	ɛ		ɔ
Open		a	

== Nouns ==
In Dilling there is no difference grammatical gender in nouns verb forms, pronouns and relative terms, to express a gender in a person one adds expression to clarify such as for example korti (man) or ḙli (woman). These are added apposition without a connector. With animals the name classifies gender and species, 'tẹ' "female cow" and 'tere' "bull".

Dilling does not have specific and non specific articles but it uses personal pronouns of the 3rd person singular or plural and is placed in front of the noun 'tẹ id' "the (mentioned) man". Exceptions are names and if the noun has an attribute afterwards it is either placed in front, between the noun and attribute or it is multiplied.

== Pronouns ==
The personal pronouns are:

Person	Singular	Plural
1st	ẹ	i
2nd	a	u
3rd	tẹ/te̬	ti

Often times one only puts first person pronouns in front of the verb and leaves it out when referring to the 3rd person sg/pl or if they wanted to use it as a noun when they want to stress this part, they would put it in front of the verb.

== Numbers ==
Numbers 1 to 29 are written in Dilling starting from 30 numbers are either accumulating the numbers or taken from Arabic especially starting from 100.

1 bēn oder ben

2 óren

3 tọcuṅ (töduṅ)

4 kẹmíńen

5 tišin

6 kwarten

7 kwálān

8 ẹddin

9 wēn

10 búren

11 bure bé kǒ

12 bur óro kǒ

13 bur tẹ kǒ

14 bur kẹn kǒ

15 bur tís kǒ

16 bur kwártu kǒ

17 bur kwalā kǒ

18 bur ẹddu kǒ

19 bur wẹ kǒ

20 tarben

21 tar(be) bé kǒ

22 tar(be) óro kǒ

23 tar tē kǒ

24 tar kẹn kǒ

25 tar(be) tís kǒ

26 tar(be) kwártu kǒ

27 tar kwalā kǒ

28 tar(be) ẹddu kǒ

29 tar(be) wẹ kǒ
