= Kadaru language =

Nubian language spoken in Sudan

Kadaru
- Kodhin
- Native to: Sudan
- Region: Nuba Mountains
- Ethnicity: Kadaru
- Native speakers: 25,000 (2013)
- Language family: Nilo-Saharan?: Eastern Sudanic; Northern Eastern; Nubian; Central; Hill; Kadaru–Ghulfan; Kadaru
- Dialects: Kadaru (Kodur); Kururu (Tagle); Kafir (Ka’e); Kurtala (Ngokra); Dabatna (Kaaral); Kuldaji (Kendal)

Language codes
- ISO 639-3: kdu
- Glottolog: kada1282
- ELP: Kadaru
- Kadaru is classified as Definitely Endangered by the UNESCO Atlas of the World's Languages in Danger.

Kadaru (also Kadaro, Kadero, Kaderu, Kodhin, Kodhinniai, Kodoro, Tamya) is a Hill Nubian language spoken in the northern Nuba Mountains in the south of Sudan. It is spoken by around 25,000 people in the Jibaal as-Sitta (Mountains of the Six) hills, between Dilling and Delami. Kordofan Nubian is a cluster of dialects also called Ajang Language with names of dialects varying according to specific clans. According to Ajang people, they all belong to one language group and although some sounds and words might have changed with time, they can understand each other quite well. It is closely related to Ghulfan, with which it forms the Kadaru-Ghulfan subgroup of Hill Nubian.

In the Middle Ages, the Nubian language was used as lingua franca of the Sudan and was used in writing, commerce and by the government. According to Ali Obeid Birema, Kadero should be considered as a diminishing language caused by the influence of Arabic and the ever-decreasing number of speakers.

== Dialects ==
Ethnologue reports that there are six dialects spoken by six clan groups living on six separate hills: Kadaru (Kodur), Kururu (Tagle), Kafir (Ka’e), Kurtala (Ngokra), Dabatna (Kaaral) and Kuldaji (Kendal). The Western form used by the Berko people at Habila (southwest of Jebel Sitta, neighbouring the Ghulfan) may be another dialect or a separate language. Since Kadaru per se is understudied, many articles on Ajang Language use examples from various dialects, based on the fact that these are closely related dialects.

== Phonology ==
=== Consonants ===
There are 22 consonants in Kadaru, with voiced and voiceless plosives in five places of articulation. "There is only one fricative /ʃ/ which we assign to the palatal column. There are three alveolar liquids – a lateral, a trill, and a flap – and there are two central approximants.".

Consonants chart
		Labial	Dental	Coronal		Palatal	Velar	
		Labial	Dental	plain	labialized	Palatal	plain	labialized
Plosive	voiceless	p	t̪	t	(tʷ)	c	k	(kʷ)
Plosive	voiced	b	d̪	d		ɟ	g	
Fricative						ʃ		
Nasal		m		n		ɲ	ŋ	
Lateral				l				
Trill				r				
Flap				ɽ				
Approximant		w				j		

==== Distribution ====
When it comes to the distribution, only 10 consonants were found in all the positions (initial, intervocalic and final). As seen in the table labial dental and velar consonants appear on the initial position only voiceless. The situation changes, however, in the final position where only labial and velar consonants appear, both voiceless. Contrary to Sudanese Arabic, Kadaru-Kurtala labial plosives are voiceless in the final position of the word.

ɪ́p "tail"

ʃap "giraffe"

kɔ́p "lion"

nɔ́p "gold"

tɔ́p "earth"

Distribution chart
Phoneme	Initial	Meaning	Intervocalic	Meaning	Final	Meaning
(p)	-		-		kɔp	lion
b	bʊ́l	dog	àbʊ́l	mouth	-	
t̪	t̪uríɲ	locust	jat̪ʊ	goat	ít̪	person
(d̪)	-		bid̪id̪	bat	bid̪id̪	bat
t	tidəm	ostrich	titim	dove	ʃʊ́t	thread
d	doː	skin	dɛdʊ	cloud	ʃúd	sand
(tʷ)	tʷanʊ	bellies	-		-	
(c)	caŋ	python	-		-	

==== Consonant contrast ====
Since the language lacks minimal pairs, the following table shows pairs in which the two consonants are in minimal contrast in the syllable in which they occur.

Contrast chart
p-b	-		-	
b-m	abʊl	mouth	ɔmʊl	elephant
b-w	bara	yellow	wata	ash
m-w	mɛɲ	back	wɛŋɡa	that
t̪-d̪	(ít	person	bid̪id̪	bat)
t̪-t	(t̪uɾíɲ	locust	titim	dove)
d̪-d	ʊd̪ʊ	breast	dɛdʊ	cloud
t-t^{w}	taɽʊm	tortoise	tʷanʊ	bellies
t-d	tɛɲʊ	thigh	dɛdʊ	cloud
	katʊ	field	dɛdʊ	cloud
	ʃʊ́t	thread	ʃúd	sand
d-n	dʊl	larynx	nʊm	throne
d-l	(dɛdʊ	cloud	bɛlɛ	sesame)
n-l	(ɛnɛn	mother	bɛlɛ	sesame)
l-r	kɛlɪ	food	ɛrɪ	rope
l-ɽ	ʃalɛ	salt	taɽɛ	plate
r-ɽ	(ɪrɪɲ	nose	kɪ̀ɽáŋ	drum)
c-ɟ	(caŋ	python	ɟadʊ	tongue)

==== Consonant sequences ====
Consonant sequences in Kadaru are considered relatively free, even including a sequence of two plosive consonants. The table below shows that the range of consonant sequences in Kadaru is bigger than in, for example, Uncu, a different Ghulfan language closely related to Kadaru.

Chart
Kadaru-Kurtala	Word	Meaning	Uncu	Word	Meaning
nt̪	nɔnt̪ʊ	moon	nt̪	t̪ɛ̀nt̪ʊ	intestines
nd̪	ɟʊ́nd̪ʊ	small	nd̪	kánd̪ɛ̀t̪ʊ	bird
nt	kúntú	knee	nt	ɔ̀ntʊ́	arm
nd	kʊnda	smoke	nd	arɛndʊ́wa	sky
ɲɟ	kʊɲɟaŋ	lyre	ɲɟ	tɔɲɟɔ	thigh
ŋɡ	ɔŋɡɔl	road			
mt	kʊmtɛ	(woman's name)			
ɲd	akiɲdʊ	adze			
ld̪	eld̪o	heart	ld̪	ábʊld̪ɛ	adze
lt	káltʊ́	eye	lt	káltʊ̀	eye
lɖ	kʊlɖaɟɪ	(clan name)			
lɕ	ʊlɕa	ear	lɕ	ʊlca	ear
lm	ʃalmɛ	chin			
rb	t̪arbʊ	twenty	rb	t̪àrbɔ	twenty
rt̪	kɔrt̪ʊ	shoe	rt̪	ɔrt̪ɪ	sheep
rt	wərtíl	sheep	rt	àmʊrtɛ̂	palm
rd̪	kɔrd̪ʊ	forest	rd̪	ʃɛ̀rd̪ʊː	short
			rd	kʷardɪlɛ	cock
rʃ	kɔrʃʊ	six	rʃ	ɪ́rʃʊ	wind
rk	bɛrkʊ	(placename)			
			rŋ	ɔrŋaɽʊ	leaf
kl	taklɛ	(clan name)			
			kr	kákrɪ́	stones
kɽ	ŋɔkɽal	(clan name)			
dk	kudkire	dust			

=== Vowels ===
In Kadaru one can identify 10 vowels distinguished by the advanced tongue root dividing them into two 5 element groups.

Vowel phonemes
	[-ATR]			[+ATR]		
	front	central	back	front	central	back
close	ɪ		ʊ	i		u
mid	ɛ		ɔ	(e)		o
open		a			(ə)	

==== Vowel contrasts ====
	two identical vowels	meaning	single vowel	meaning
i	irid̪	canoe	it̪	person
i	íríɲ	scorpion	ʃiŋ	termite house
i	titim	dove	ʃíːl	king
i	bid̪id̪	bat	t̪i	cow
ɪ	kɪ́nɪ́	doors	ɪ́p	tail
ɪ	ɪ́rɪŋ	nose	t̪ɪ̀l	hair
ɪ	ɲɪŋɪl	left side	ɪː	sun
e	nenɟê	what is it?	kel	stick
ɛ	bɛlɛ	sesame	kɛ́l	boundary
ɛ	ɛnɛn	mother	mɛ̀ɲ	back
ɛ	t̪ɛrrɛ	bull	bɛ̀ː	one
ɛ	bɛɟɛ	green		
ə	kəɽəl	(placename)		
ə	ʃəʃə	k.o. tree		
a	kàkà	crow	kal	porridge
a	kákáː	stone		
a	áɾa	rain		
a	tataŋ	all	tɔ́ː	belly
ɔ	ɔ́kɔ̀	chest	kɔp	lion
ɔ	ɔŋɡɔl	road	ɔŋ	year
ɔ	ɔrrɔ	two	kòl	house
o			doː	skin
o			oː	hillside spring
ʊ	kʊddʊ	leg	bʊ́l	dog
ʊ	ʊ́ɡʊ́	blood	nʊm	throne
ʊ	ʊ́d̪ʊ́	breast	dʊ́l	larynx
ʊ	kʊmʊ̀l	snake	ʃʊ́t	thread
u	unu	flies	ʃúd	sand
u	kúntú	knee	kuː	chicken stomach
u	kúndu	smoke		
u	kùd̪ú	mount		

==== Vowel distribution ====
Vowel distribution. Vowels appear unrestricted when it comes to the position of the phoneme in a word. However, vowels from different [ATR] sets do not appear together in a word.

phon. initial			medial		final	
i	ɪrt̪id̪a	root	kedil	bone	èʃí	hand
ɪ	ɪ́ɟɪŋ	nose	t̪ɪ́l	hair	kɪ́nɪ́	doors
e	èʃí	hand	bèrí	yellow	biɟe	beer
ɛ	ɛnɛn	mother	t̪ɛrrɛ	bull	bɛlɛ	sesame
u	unut̪	fly	ʃút̪í	fish spear	úɡú	big
ʊ	ʊ́nɪ	relative	bʊ́l	dog	ɪ̀d̪ʊ	woman
o	óndo	donkey	kól	house	doː	skin
ɔ	ɔ́mʊl	elephant	bɔ́lt̪ʊ		ɔrrɔ	two
ə	əboki	(place name)	koɟəŋ	alligator	ʃekkə	(pers. name)
a	àttʊ́	wing	kal	porridge	dɔta	tool

==== Syllables and prosody ====
In Kadaru-Kurtala one can find all four basic syllable types: CV, V, VC, CVC.

Basic syllables
CV	t̪í	cow
V	ɛ̀ː	we
VC	ɔŋ	year
CVC	kòl	house

The four types also combine in longer words, however the language lacks the combination V.V.

Syllables in words
CV.CV	bɛ.lɛ	sesame
CV.CVC	ka.ɽɔl	fish
CVC.CV	kɔr.t̪ʊ	shoe
CVC.CVC	wər.til	sheep
VC.CV	on.do	donkey
VC.CVC	ɔŋ.ɡɔl	road
V.CV	ʊ.nɪ	grass
V.CVC	i.rid	canoe
V.V		

Evidence shows a strong presence of long vowels both in word of one open syllable and in longer words. The evidence also suggests tonality in the language. Tagle (Kururu) language also from Jibaal as-Sitta shows more tendency of tonality with three tones: falling, high and low. Due to the lack of sufficient research, one cannot say for sure, but one could assume that Kadaru is also a tonal language, since all Ajang languages are considered tonal languages.

== Orthography ==
=== Arabic script ===
==== Consonants ====
One of the possible systems of writing Ajang languages is the Arabic script. ALESCO (Arab League Educational Scientific Cultural Organization) offered some solutions to how to write non-Arabic languages in Arabic script. The issue with the Arabic script is the fact that Arabic has thirteen consonants that do not exist in Ajang. Moreover, for six consonants that could be found in Ajang but not in Arabic, ALESCO suggests solutions only to three of them.

for g	گ
for ɲ	ݧ
for ŋ	ݝ
for t̪	no symbol
for d̪	no symbol
for ɽ	no symbol

===== Vowels =====
Vowels become even more problematic, since Arabic has only three short and three long vowels. Ajang in contrast has seven vowels. Here ALESCO also suggests a possible solution. The proposed symbols, however, are confusing and are not available on computers.

=== Old Nubian Script ===
The advantage of Old Nubian is the availability of symbols for all consonants. The script becomes problematic when it comes to spelling of + and – ATR vowels. The Ajang community has decided that the Old Nubian script would have to be adjusted for a better distinction between ATR vowels.

Sound	Spelling
a	Ⲁ
ʷa	ɯⲀ
ɛ	Ⲉ
ɘ	Ⲁy
ɪ	l
ʊ	
ɔ	Ⲟ
e	ɛy
i	ly
u	
o	ⲞY
b	B
w	Ⲱ
m	M
f	Ⲫ
d̪	Ⲇ
d	Ⲇ'
t̪	T
t	T'
n	N
l	Ⲗ
r	Ⲣ
ɽ	Ⲣ'
ʃ	Ϣ
dʒ	Ⳝ
ɲ	Ⳡ
g	Ⲅ
k	K
ŋ	Ⳟ
h	Ϩ

=== Adapted Latin script ===
Adapted Latin script is considered the best option for spelling of Ajang languages because of its flexibility, availability of many symbols, and the possibility to indicate tone.

==== Consonants ====
b [b], c [S], d [d], f [f], g [g], h [h], j [dz], k [k], 1 [1], Ir[c], m [m], n [n], ng [n], ny[n], r [r], t [t], th [t], w [w], y [j]

==== Vowels ====
a [a], e [e], i [i], o [o], ø [o], u [u]

==== Diagraphs and monographs ====
Diagraphs are considered a solution to the challenge of writing of all eleven vowels present in Ajang languages. For example, Warki and Kaak use diagraphs for some consonants:

Warki: /lr/, /th/, /ng/ and /ny/

Kaak: /dh, /th/, /rh/, /ng/ and /ny/

In order to include both the [ATR] and tonality of vowels a different solution was created. By using some symbols available on computers and by putting diacritics one could both indicate the vowel and its tone.

i		u
ɨ	æ	ʊ
e		o
ɛ	a	ø

Alaki and Norton suggest a slightly different orthography to the one proposed by Jabr el Dar. They added 's' for the palatal fricative in order to distinguish it from the palatal plosive 'c'. They also propose umlauts for +ATR vowels in Kadaru, with the exception of the letter ⟨a⟩. The also recommend an orthography without tone marks, since it could have negative effects on the process of writing and reading.

== Grammar ==
=== Verbal number ===
Uncu, a closely related language to Kadaru, shows evidence of verbal number in its grammatical structure. In Uncu the number of the object or subject determines participant number, whereas the event number is determined by the frequency or repetition of an event.

=== Participant number ===
When the object of a transitive verb is plural, the extension -er is added to the root of the verb before the infliction markers. In the case of intransitive verbs, the extension -er is added to the root of the verb when the subject is plural.

kɪ̄tʊ́ kūj-ōóŋ
door.SG open-PAST.2SG
"You (SG) opened a door."

kɪ̄nɪ́ kūj-ēr-ōóŋ
door.PL open-PLr-PAST.2SG
"You (SG) opened doors."

Intransitive verb:

ŋāj-ōóŋ
walk-PAST.2SG
"You (SG) walked."

ŋāj-ēr-ūúŋ
walk-PLR-PAST.2PL
"You (PL) walked.

Transitive verbs with a plural object or intransitive verbs with plural subject sometimes need a suppletive form including -k or -ʃ extension or involving change in vowel quality.

TR verbs with suppletive forms for PL O
s	o	sell	eat
SG	SG	ʃàn-í	kōl-í
PL	SG	ʃàn-é	kōl-é
SG	PL	ʃàn-î	kàm-î
PL	PL	ʃàn-ê	kàm-ê

=== Event number ===
Event number is used when a speaker wants to express performing of an action habitually or iteratively. It is marked by -ʈ, -ug, -k, -ʃ, -c extensions and partial reduplication of the root.

ǐ ùljé òná ʃērg-ēr-ēé
1SG ear.PL 1SG.GEN puncture-PLR-PAST.1SG
"I pierced my ears."

ǐ kūmé=nàá ūrtál=gí wār-í-kò tób=gí ʃērk-éé
1SG rat=GEN exit-hole=ACC search-SSC-INS ground=ACC puncture.REP-PAST.1SG
"Searching for the rat exit-hole I poked the ground repeatedly."

=== Noun phrase ===
In Kordofan Nubian, like in many Nubian languages one can find noun phrase constructions. There are two types of noun phrases in Nubian, namely ones consisting of a noun with or without modifiers, and ones with a single person pronoun, determine or a single quantifier without any nominal modifiers.

==== Possessive adjective + noun ====
In Kordofan Nubian possessive adjectives are derived from personal pronouns by adding the genitive linker -n. Examples from Tabaq language.

	singular	plural
1st person	an	ʊn
2nd person	ʊn	wun
3rd person	ʈɛn/ʈan	ʈin

an uudo
1.SG.GEN goat
‘My goat’

==== Determiners in Kordofan Nubian (Examples from Tabaq) ====
This	iŋ
These	ɛnɛ
That	waŋ
Those	wanɛ

iŋ dʊl
DET.SG granary
‘this granary’

==== Noun + numeral/quantifier ====
In Nubian numerals follow the head noun. The same happens with quantifiers.

idu bɛra
person one
‘one person’

ʊʊdʊ kimiɲ kɔɔ
month four have.3SG
‘s/he has four months’

== Influence of Arabic on Kadaru ==
Because of the language policy in Sudan, the Arabisation of the educational system, and the fact that Arabic became the lingua franca of Sudan, indigenous languages become highly influenced by Arabic. Ali Obeid Birema studied the amount of loan words in Kadaru in many areas of life, ranging from daily life, through songs, to politics and market. In some cases, the amount of loan words in an expression was as high as 83.3% and the average percentage of loan words in the studied statements was 49.9%.

=== Example texts and lists of loan words ===
==== 1. ====
Iru robber ella tiigi robbema ogugi robbema kukuri robbema alla inɖigi onɖii robbema hamaamgi robbema ayyi haja.

Schalenjeruwa shalenjerigi eiye ʈe she, inɖi iyembergi ilɽan kuner oway kil fanongu aan kora fanongu aan ger irshu fanongu, haa laakin eiyembe illa kunen kije ʈe.

'The people rear cows, they rear goats, and they rear chicken, and also, they rear donkeys, they breed doves anything.'

'The wild animals I know of, and there are those which I do not know of. I only hear people talk about them. There are gazelles; there are antelopes and porcupines. I do not know them all, I only hear about them.'

Examples of loan words(1)
Borrowed Words and Expression	Meaning
robber	to keep animals
robbema	used to keep animals
hamaamgi	domestic doves
ayyi	any
haja	thing
laakin	but
illa	except (only)

Number of loan words: 6 out of 42 = 14.3% deviation

==== 2. ====
Allijir lowaariko, fi alkharif neji belkureein.

'In summer we come in lorries, in rainy season we walk.'

Examples of loan words (2)
Borrowed Words and Expression	Meaning
lowaariko	by lorries
fi	in
alkharif	rainy season
neji	we come
belkureein	with feet (walking)

Number of loan words: 5 out of 7 = 83.3% deviation
