= Ghulfan people =

Ethnic group in Sudan

Ghulfan is an ethnic group in the Nuba Mountains of Sudan. Their primary language is Ghulfan. They are Muslims.
