= Carina M. Schlebusch =

Evolutionary biologist

Carina Maria Schlebusch is an evolutionary biologist at the University of Uppsala in Sweden. She is a specialist in the population history of Africa. In 2017 she was the co-author of a paper that suggested that modern humans emerged more than 300,000 years ago.
