= Hill Nubians =

Group of Nubian peoples inhabiting the Nuba Mountains of Sudan

Total population
- 103,050

Regions with significant populations
- Sudan (Nuba Mountains)

Languages
- Hill Nubian

Religion
- Sunni Islam

Related ethnic groups
- Nubians

Hill Nubians are a group of Nubian peoples who inhabit the northern Nuba Mountains in South Kordofan state, Sudan. They speak the Hill Nubian languages. Despite their scattered presence and linguistic diversity, they all refer to themselves as Ajang and call their language Ajangwe, "the Ajang language".

== Origin ==
Canadian linguist Robin Thelwall believes that the Hill Nubians probably didn't migrate to the Nuba Mountains from Nubia, considering their linguistic divergence, and instead probably reached the Nuba Mountains from central Kordofan during the earliest Nubian migrations. Joseph Greenberg believes that any split between Hill and Nile Nubian must have occurred at least 2,500 years before present.

== See also ==
- Languages of the Nuba Mountains
