= Eastern Sudanic languages =

Proposed language family

Eastern Sudanic
- (disputed)
- Geographic distribution: Egypt, Sudan, South Sudan, Eritrea, Ethiopia, Chad, Kenya, Tanzania, Uganda
- Linguistic classification: Nilo-Saharan?: Eastern Sudanic
- Subdivisions: Northern (k languages) Nubian Nara Nyima Taman Meroitic? †; Southern (n languages) Nilotic Surmic Jebel Temein Daju?; Kuliak (rarely included); Berta (rarely included)

Language codes
- ISO 639-5: sdv
- Glottolog: None

In most classifications, the Eastern Sudanic languages are a group of nine families of languages that may constitute a branch of the Nilo-Saharan language family. Eastern Sudanic languages are spoken from southern Egypt to northern Tanzania.

Nubian (and possibly Meroitic) gives Eastern Sudanic some of the earliest written attestations of African languages. However, the largest branch by far is Nilotic, spread by extensive and comparatively recent conquests throughout East Africa. Before the spread of Nilotic, Eastern Sudanic was centered in present-day Sudan. The name "East Sudanic" refers to the eastern part of the region of Sudan where the country of Sudan is located, and contrasts with Central Sudanic and Western Sudanic (modern Mande, in the Niger–Congo family).

Lionel Bender (1980) proposes several Eastern Sudanic isoglosses (defining words), such as *kutuk "mouth", *(ko)TVS-(Vg) "three", and *ku-lug-ut or *kVl(t) "fish".

In older classifications, such as that of Meinhof (1911), the term was used for the eastern Sudanic languages, largely equivalent to modern Nilo-Saharan sans Nilotic, which is the largest constituent of modern Eastern Sudanic.

Güldemann (2018, 2022) considers East Sudanic to be undemonstrated at the current state of research. He only accepts the evidence for a connection between the Nilotic and Surmic languages as "robust", and states that Rilly's evidence (see below) for the northern group comprising Nubian, Nara, Nyima, Taman and Meroitic "certainly look[s] promising". He finds the Southern East Sudanic unit (comprising Nilotic, Surmic, Jebel, Temein and Daju) typologically coherent and, with the exclusion of Daju, showing likely correspondences among personal pronouns. Glottolog (2023) does not accept even a Surmic–Nilotic relationship.

== Typology ==
The putative Eastern Sudanic languages are "surprisingly diverse" and resemble in this the larger Nilo-Saharan proposal. No common typological features unify them. A set of head-initial languages corresponds largely with the Southern group (typologically similar to also e.g. the Kadu and Central Sudanic families), and a set of head-final languages corresponds largely with the Northern group (typologically similar to also e.g. the Maban and Saharan families). Typological difference, however, does not preclude a relationship, and typological similarities with nearby certainly or likely unrelated languages suggests that these similarities might be partly areal. Omotic and Cushitic, in particular, are nearby head-final families belonging instead in the large Afro-Asiatic phylum and forming the Ethiopian language area.

== Internal classification ==
There are several different classifications of East Sudanic languages.

=== Bender (2000) ===
Lionel Bender assigns the languages into two branches, depending on whether the 1st person singular pronoun ("I") has a /k/ or an /n/:

- Eastern Sudanic
  - Northern (k languages)
    - Nubian
    - Nara
    - Nyima
    - Taman
  - Southern (n languages)
    - Surmic
    - Eastern Jebel
    - Temein (Nuba Hills)
    - Daju
    - Nilotic

=== Rilly (2009) ===
Claude Rilly (2009:2) provides the following internal structure for the Eastern Sudanic languages.

- Eastern Sudanic
  - - Northern Eastern Sudanic
      - Nyima
      - Taman
      - - Nara
        - - Meroitic
          - Nubian
    - - Nilotic
      - Surmic
  - Jebel
  - Temein
  - Daju

=== Starostin (2015) ===
Starostin, using lexicostatistics, finds strong support for Bender's Northern branch, but none for the Southern branch. Eastern Sudanic as a whole is rated a probable working model, pending proper comparative work, while the relationship between Nubian, Tama, and Nara is beyond reasonable doubt.

- Eastern Sudanic
  - - NNT
      - Nubian
      - - Nara
        - Taman
    - ? Nyima
  - ? Surmic
  - ? Jebel
  - ? Temein
  - ? Daju
  - ? Nilotic

Nyima is not part of the northern group, though it appears to be closest to it. (For one thing, its pronouns align well with the northern (Astaboran) branches.) Surmic, Nilotic, and Temein share a number of similarities, including in their pronouns, but not enough to warrant classifying them together in opposition to Astaboran without proper comparative work. Jebel and Daju also share many similarities with Surma and Nilotic, though their pronominal systems are closer to Astaboran.

Inclusion of Kuliak and Berta is not supported. Similarities with Kuliak may be due to both being Nilo-Saharan families, whereas Berta and Jebel form a sprachbund.

A similar classification was given in Starostin (2014):

- Eastern Sudanic
  - Tama-Nara-Nubian branch
    - Tama
    - Nara-Nubian
      - Nara
      - Nubian
  - Surmic branch
    - Northern Surmic (= Majang)
    - Southern Surmic
      - Southwest Surmic
      - Southeast Surmic
  - Nilotic branch
    - Northern Nilotic
      - Western Nilotic
      - Eastern Nilotic
    - Southern Nilotic
  - Daju
  - Nyimang
  - Temein
  - Jebel

=== Blench (2019, 2021) ===
Roger Blench (2019) and (2021), like Starostin, only finds support for Bender's Northern branch. Blench proposes the following internal structure, supported by morphological evidence.

- East Sudanic
  - Nilotic
  - Surmic
  - Eastern Jebel
  - Daju
  - Temein
  - Northeast Sudanic
    - - Nubian
      - Nara
      - Taman
      - Ama

=== Dimmendaal & Jakobi (< 2020) ===
Dimmendaal & Jakobi (2020:394), published in 2020 but written some times earlier, retains Bender's Southern branch; they also accept Berta:

- Eastern Sudanic
  - Northern
    - Taman
    - Meroitic
    - Nubian
    - Nara
    - Nyima
  - Southern
    - - Berta
      - Jebel
    - - Daju
      - Temeinian
      - - Surmic
        - Nilotic

== Numerals ==
Comparison of numerals in individual languages (excluding Nilotic and Surmic languages):

Classification	Language	1	2	3	4	5	6	7	8	9	10
Nara	Nara (Nera)	dōkkūū	àriɡáà	sāāná	ʃōōná	wiita	dáátà	jāāriɡáà (5+ 2) ?	dèssèná (5+ 3) ?	lùfūttá-màdāā (10–1) ?	lùfūk
Nubian, Western	Midob Nubian	pàrci	ə̀ddí	táasí	èejí	téccí	kórcí	òlòttì	ídíyí	úkúdí / úfúdí	tímmíjí
Nubian, Northern	Nobiin (1)	weː˥r	u˥wwo˥	tu˥sko˥	ke˥mso˥	di˧dʒ	ɡo˥rdʒo˥	ko˧lo˧d	i˥dwo˥	o˧sko˧d	di˥me˥
Nubian, Northern	Nobiin (2)	wèer/ wéer	úwwó	túskú / tískó	kémsó	dìj / dìjì	ɡórjó	kòlòd	ídwó	òskòd / òskòdi	dímé
Nubian, Central, Hill, Kadaru-Ghulfan	Kadaru	bèè	òró	tèɟɟúk	kèɲɟú	tìccʊ́	kɔ́rʃʊ́	kɔ́ladʊ́	ɪ̀d̪d̪ɔ́	wìɪd̪ɔ́	bùɽè
Nubian, Central, Hill, Kadaru-Ghulfan	Ghulfan	bɛr	óra	tóǰuk	kɪ́ɲu	ʈiʃú	kwúrʃu	kwalát	ɪ́ddu	wìít	buɽé
Nubian, Central, Hill, Unclassified	Dilling	bee	oree	tujjuŋ j = dʒ or ɟ ?	kimmiɲi	ticci c = tʃ or c ?	kʷarcu	kʷalad	ɪddɪ	wit	bure
Nyimang	Afitti	àndá	àrmák	àcúp	kòrsík	múl	màndár	màrám	dùvá	àdìsól	òtúmbùrà
Nyimang	Ama (Nyimang)	ɲálā	ārbā	āsá	kùd̪ò	mūl	kūrʃ	kūlād̪	èd̪ò	wìèd̪ò	fòɽó
Tama, Mararit	Mararit (Mararet)	kára~kún / karre	warɪ / warre	ètte~ítí / ataye	kow / ɡaw	máai / maye	túur / tuur	kul / kuuri	kàkàwák / kokuak (4+ 4)	kàrkʌ́s / kekeris	tók / toɡ
Tama, Tama-Sungor	Sungor (Assangori)	kur	wári	écà	kús	mási	tɔ̀r	kál	kíbís	úkù	mɛ̀r
Tama, Tama-Sungor	Tama (1)	kúˑr	wárí	íɕí	kús /kus	massi / masi	tɔˑ́r	kâl	kímís	úkū	mír
Tama, Tama-Sungor	Tama (2)	kʊ́rʊ́	wɛ̀rːɛ̀	ɪ̀cːáʔ	kʊʃ	masɛː	t̪ɔ́rː	kəl	kíbìs	ʊ́kːʊ́	mɛ̀ːr
Daju, Eastern Daju	Liguri Daju (Logorik)	nɔhɔrɔk	pɛtdax	kɔdɔs	tɛspɛt	mdɛk	kɔskɔdɔs (2 x 3)	tɛspɛtkɔdɔs (4 + 3)	tɛspɛttɛspɛt (4 + 4)	mdɛktɛspɛt (5 + 4)	saʔasɛɲ
Daju, Eastern Daju	Shatt Damam	núuxù	pɨ̀dàx	kòdòs	tèspèt	mɨ̀dɨ̀k	áaràn	pàxtíndìɲ	kòs(s)èndàŋ tèspédèspè {four.four}	dábàs(s)éndàŋ ~bây.núuxù	àsìɲ
Daju, Western Daju	Dar Dadju Daju	mùnɡún	fìdà /pîda	kòdɔ̀s	tɛ̀spɛ̀t	mòdùk	àràŋ	fàktíndí	kòsóndá	bìstóndá	àsíŋ
Daju, Western Daju	Dar Sila Daju (1)	ùŋɡʊ̀n	bìdàk	kòdòs	tìʃɛ̀t	mùdùk	(ʔ)àràn ~ (ʔ)àrân	fáktíndì	kòohándà	bìstándà	àsîŋ
Daju, Western Daju	Dar Sila Daju (2)	ʊ́ŋɡʊ́n	bíd̪ák	kɔ̀d̪ɔs	t̪ɪ̀ʃɛ́ːθ	múd̪uk	árān̪	fáθɪ́nd̪ɪ́	kɔ̀ánd̪a	bɪ̀sθánd̪a	ásːɪŋ
Eastern Jebel, Gaam	Gaahmɡ (Tabi) (1)	t̪āmán	d̪áāɡɡ	ɔ́ðɔ̄	yə̄ə̄sə́	áás-ááman (lit: 'hand')	t̪ə́ld̪ìɡɡ	íd̪iɡɡ-ɔ́ðɔ̄ (lit: 'eyes-two')	íd̪iɡ-dáāɡɡ (lit: 'eyes-three')	íd̪iɡ-yə̄ə̄sə́ (lit: 'eyes-four')	ə́sēɡ-dí (lit: 'hands-also')
Eastern Jebel, Gaam	Gaahmɡ (Tabi) (2)	taman	diɔk / diak	oða / ʔoda	yɛsu /yɛzan	ʌsumʌn	tɛltɛk /tɛldɛk	tauðuk / idakʼdiak (5 + 2)	kurbaiti /idukʼʔoda (5 + 3)	akaitɛn / idukʼyɛsu (5 + 4)	ʔasiɡdi

== Bibliography ==
- Bender, M. Lionel. 2000. "Nilo-Saharan". In: Bernd Heine and Derek Nurse (eds.), African Languages: An Introduction. Cambridge University Press.
- Bender, M. Lionel. 1981. "Some Nilo-Saharan isoglosses". In: Thilo Schadeberg, M. L. Bender (eds.), Nilo-Saharan: Proceedings of the First Nilo-Saharan Linguistics Colloquium, Leiden, Sept. 8–10, 1980. Dordrecht: Foris Publications.
- Temein languages (Roger Blench, 2007).
- Güldemann, Tom (2022). "The Historical-Comparative Status of East Sudanic". In Blench, Roger; Weschenfelder, Petra; Ziegelmeyer, Georg (eds.). Current Research in Nilo-Saharan. Cologne: Köppe. pp. 53–73.
- Starostin, George (2015). Языки Африки. Опыт построения лексикостатистической классификации. Том II. Восточносуданские языки [The Languages of Africa. The experience of building a lexiostatistical classification.] (in Russian). Vol. II: The Eastern Sudanic Languages. Moscow: Languages of Slavic culture. ISBN 9785457890718.
- Starostin, George. 2015. Proto-East Sudanic ʽtreeʼ on the East Sudanic tree. 10th Annual Conference on Comparative-Historical Linguistics (in memory of Sergei Starostin).
