= Nubian languages =

Language family spoken in Egypt and Sudan

Nubian
- Geographic distribution: Egypt, Sudan
- Ethnicity: Nubians
- Linguistic classification: Nilo-Saharan?: Eastern Sudanic; Northern Eastern; Nubian
- Proto-language: Proto-Nubian
- Subdivisions: Central; Northern; Western

Language codes
- ISO 639-2 / 5: nub
- Glottolog: nubi1251

The Nubian languages are languages spoken by Nubians in southern Egypt and northern Sudan. They are now concentrated mainly along the Nile and in several disconnected areas in Sudan, including parts of the Nuba Mountains and Darfur. Arabic–Nubian bilingualism is widespread, and language shift towards Arabic has been documented in a number of communities.

Though a subset of Nubian languages known as Hill Nubian are spoken in the Nuba Mountains, the term "Nubian languages" should not be confused with the term "Nuba languages", the latter referring to all of the languages spoken in the Nuba Mountains area and parts of Darfur, including many which are unrelated to Nubian dialects.

Reference works differ on Nubian's affiliation above the family level. Older classifications often placed Nubian within Nilo-Saharan (commonly under Eastern Sudanic). Glottolog treats Nubian as a primary family and asserts that a conclusive external subgrouping has not been demonstrated.

== Geographic distribution ==
Nile Nubian languages are spoken chiefly along the Nile in southern Egypt and northern Sudan. Other Nubian languages are spoken farther afield, including Hill Nubian in the Nuba Mountains and Midob in Darfur; Birgid was formerly spoken in western Sudan. Migration and urbanisation have also produced Nubian-speaking communities in major Egyptian and Sudanese cities and in diaspora settings.

== Number of speakers ==
Estimates for the Nubian languages vary by source and by how dialects and bilingual speakers are counted. A frequently cited estimate (reported in 1980, based on late-1970s figures) gives a total of about 200,000–1,000,000 speakers for the Nubian languages as a whole. Studies of Sudanese census practice discuss how language and ethnicity categories were used in 20th-century Sudan, which affects historical speaker counts and comparability across sources.

== History ==
=== Medieval Nubia (6th–15th century) ===
==== Old Nubian ====
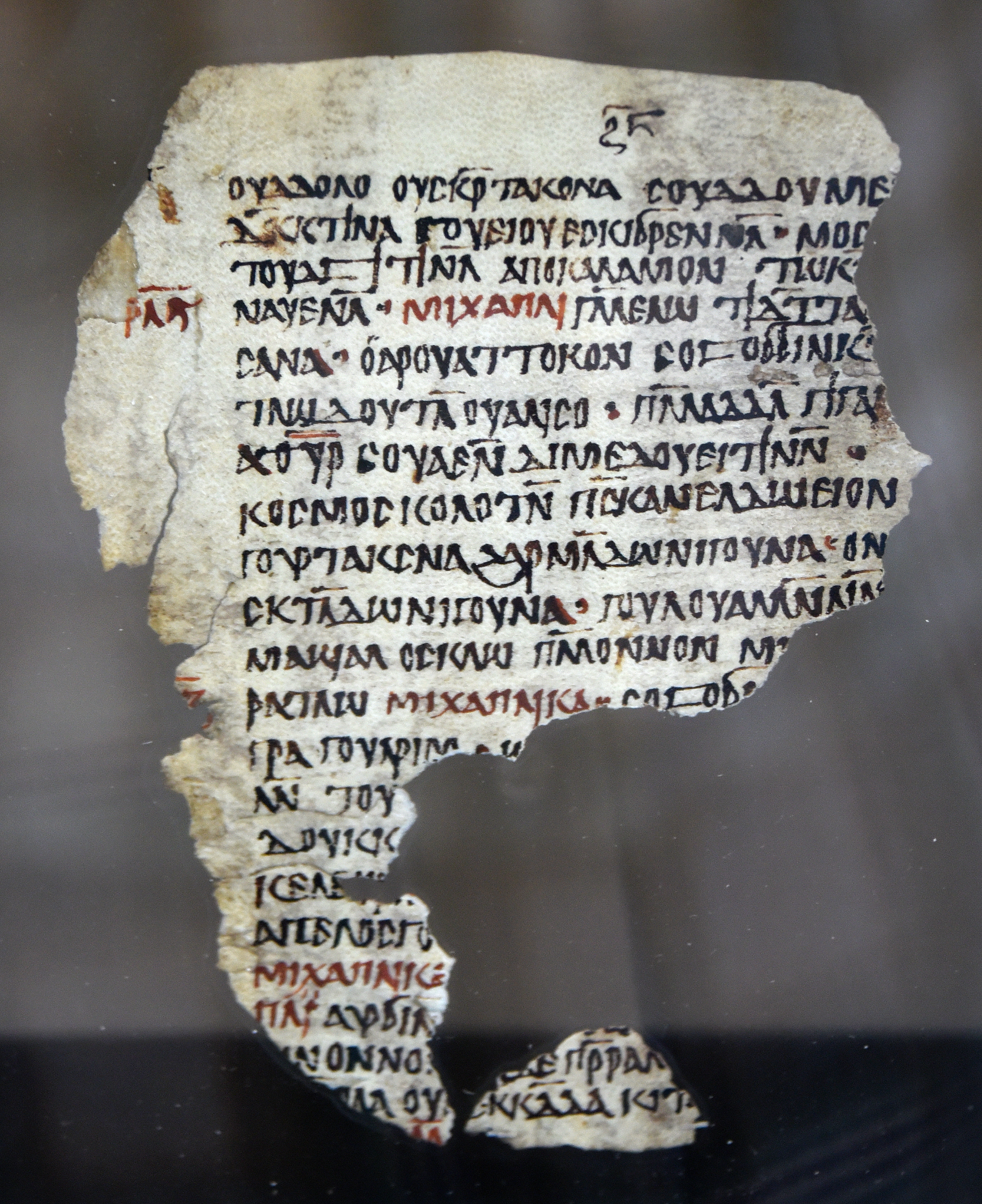
A page from an Old Nubian translation of the Investiture of the Archangel Michael (9th–10th century), found at Qasr Ibrim.

Old Nubian is the best-attested earlier Nubian language. It is preserved in manuscripts and inscriptions dating roughly from the 8th to the 15th centuries AD. Surviving texts include Christian religious works (such as homilies and prayers) and documentary material (including legal and administrative texts) associated with the medieval Nubian states of the Nile Valley.

Old Nubian was written in a slanted uncial variety of the Coptic alphabet, with additional letters and conventions adapted to Nubian phonology. Descriptions also note characters associated with the Meroitic writing tradition and the use of digraphs in some environments. Old Nubian is commonly treated as ancestral to modern Nobiin, and it shows evidence of sustained contact with other Nile Nubian varieties.

Old Nubian was a literary language that coexisted with two spoken languages, Old Nobiin and Old Dongolawi. Elements of these spoken varieties feature in informal inscriptions and onomastics. An onomastic example is the compound name element "slave (of)" / "servant (of)", called "-kouda" in Old Nobiin and "-noukout" in Old Dongolawi respectively.

==== "Alwa Nubian" ====
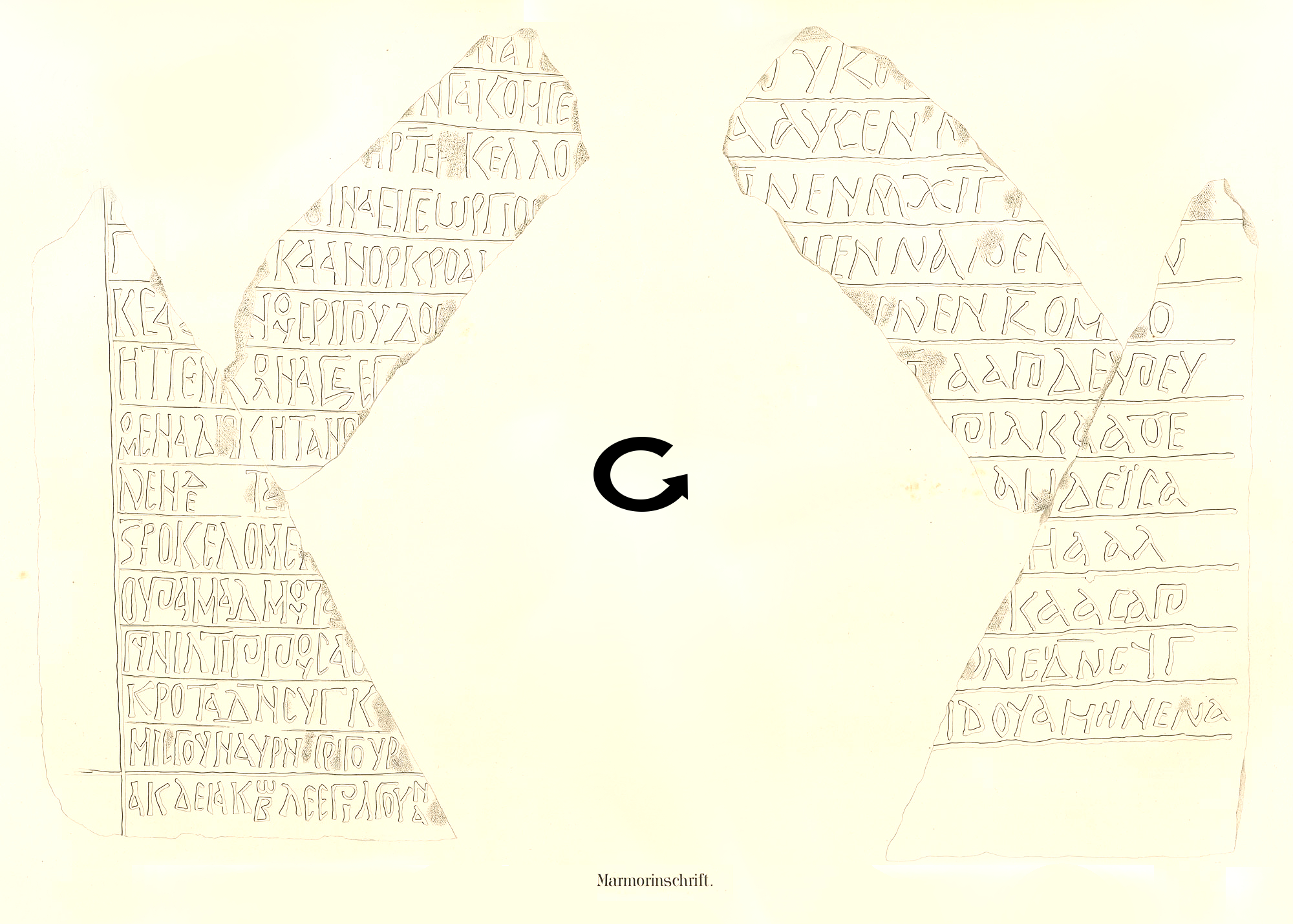
Marble monument from Soba with an undeciphered Nubian inscription, possibly an epitaph.

The linguistic situation in the southern Nubian kingdom of Alwa is still poorly understood as most inscriptions found so far are very short, often consisting of a single word. It is certain that besides Greek the Alwans also utilized Nubian as a written language. According to the 10th-century diplomat al-Aswani they had Greek books which they translated "into their own language". About 20 inscriptions discovered in Musawwarat es-Sufra, Meroe and Soba feature letters not present in Old Nubian, suggesting that the Alwans had a distinct Nubian language tentatively called "Alwa Nubian". How much "Alwa Nubian" actually differed from Old Nubian remains unclear.

==== Hill Nubian ====
According to the geographer Ibn Hawqal Makuria had a presence in northern Kordofan and Alwa in southern Kordofan. A Copto-Nubian glossary allegedly found in Qena features Nubian terms with Hill Nubian traits. Old Nubian words spread west of the Nile and were adopted into local vocabulary, like for example kirege (Greek: kirakí, "Sunday") in Dilling or téllí (Old Nubian: tilli, "God") in Midob.

=== Modern period (15th century–present) ===
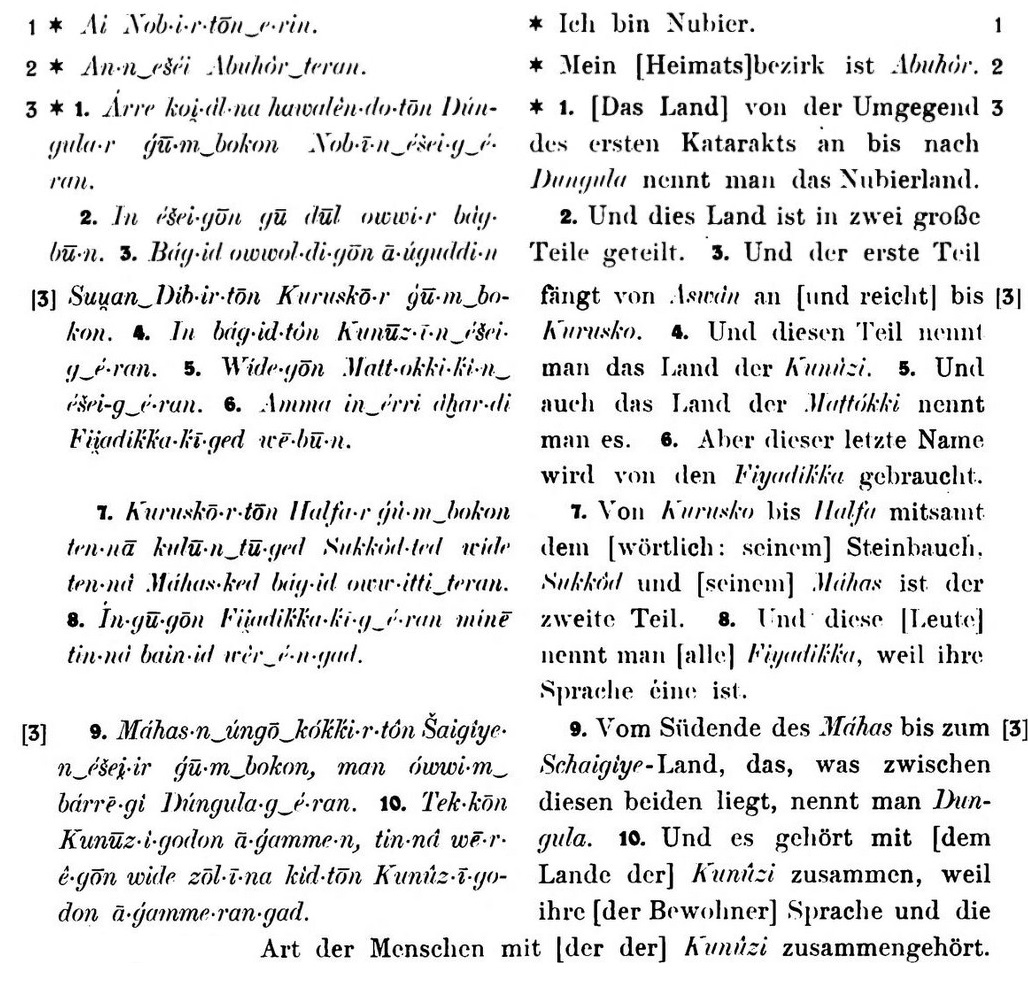
Early 20th-century description of Nubia by Samuel Ali Hiseen, a Nubian convert to Christianity. Written in Kenzi with Latin letters (left) and with German translation.

From the late medieval period onward, increased Arabic influence and widespread bilingualism reduced the range of Nubian-speaking areas and expanded Arabic use in many Nubian-speaking communities. In the 19th century Nubian had been largely reduced to north of Korti, although there were some reports that it was still spoken as far upstream as the 5th Nile cataract, if not Shendi. At the same time Nubian was still fairly widespread in Kordofan, although being on the back foot. By the mid-20th century Nubian had become extinct in northern Kordofan.

In the 20th century, resettlement associated with the construction of the Aswan High Dam displaced tens of thousands of Nubians in Egypt; one long-term study estimates about 48,000 Egyptian Nubians were resettled in connection with the dam. Relocation away from riverine villages is often discussed as a factor accelerating language shift in some settings.

== Current-day Nubian languages ==
Nubian languages are often grouped by geography and shared innovations. Commonly cited languages and groups include:

- Nobiin (also historically labeled “Mahas” and “Fadicca/Fiadicca”): spoken chiefly along the Nile in southern Egypt and northern Sudan and in diaspora communities.
- Kenzi (Mattokki) and Dongolawi (Andaandi): closely related Nile Nubian languages spoken in Egypt (Kenzi) and Sudan (Dongolawi), respectively.
- Midob (Meidob): a Western Nubian language spoken primarily in North Darfur, with additional speakers in Sudanese urban centres.
- Birgid: an extinct Nubian language formerly spoken in western Sudan.
- Hill (Kordofan) Nubian: a set of related Nubian languages spoken in parts of the northern Nuba Mountains; documentation varies by language, and Haraza is known only from wordlists.

== Phonology and typology ==
Comparative descriptions report SOV as the basic word order across Nubian languages, with postpositions and relatively complex verbal morphology. Tone is described for several Nubian languages (including Mahas/Nobiin, Dongolawi, Hill Nubian and Midob), while stress rather than tone is described for Kenzi in the same overview.

Language-specific grammars provide fuller descriptions for individual languages, including Armbruster's grammar of Dongolawi (Dongolese Nubian) and Abdel-Hafiz's grammar of Kunuz (Kenzi/Kenuzi) Nubian.

== Classification ==
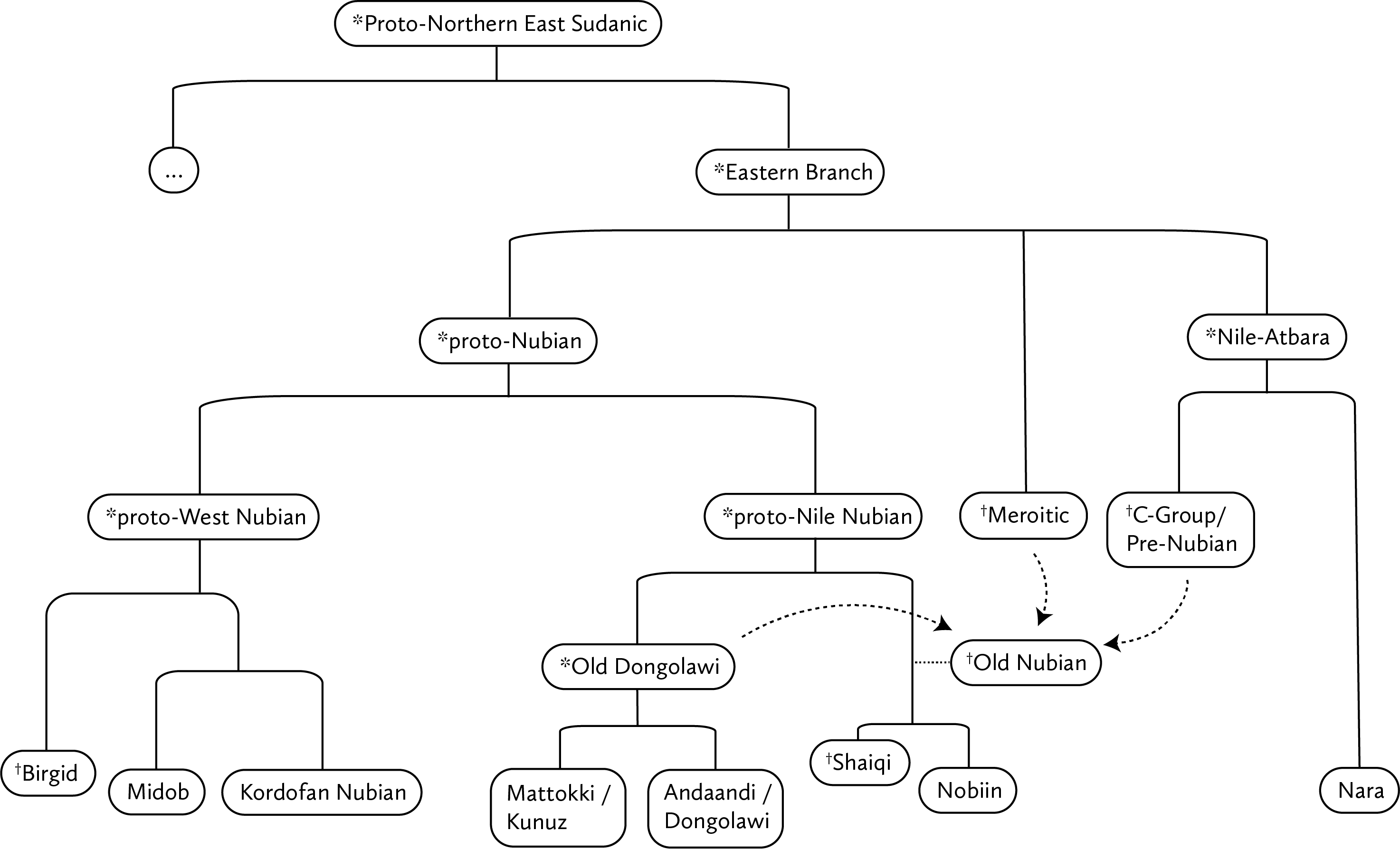
Relations between Nubian languages as commonly presented in comparative overviews (genealogical relations and contact influence). The now extinct Nubian language ("Shaiqi") of the Shaigiya tribe is depicted as being related to Nobiin, although there is also evidence that it was related or identical to Dongolawi.

Earlier reference works often divided Nubian into three branches (Northern/Nile, Central, and Western) and sometimes included Hill Nubian under Central. Recent work proposes alternative internal subgroupings and differs on the role of contact versus inheritance in explaining similarities among Nile Nubian varieties.

=== Upper-level affiliation ===
Glottolog treats Nubian as a primary family and states that no "conclusive, methodologically sound basis" has been presented for assigning it to Eastern Sudanic or to an alleged full or partial Nilo-Saharan grouping. It notes that "the parallels adduced by Gerrit J. Dimmendaal 2018 have been selected from various modern languages and have an alternative explanation as chance resemblances until shown to be reconstructable in the various microgroups."

=== Internal subgrouping ===
Claude Rilly proposes a primary split between Nile Nubian and Western Nubian, with Midob and Hill Nubian grouped within Western Nubian, and with Kenzi–Dongolawi as a Nile Nubian branch alongside Old Nubian–Nobiin.

One simplified representation (terminology varies between authors) is:

- Nubian
  - Nile Nubian
    - Old Nubian
      - Nobiin
    - Kenzi–Dongolawi
      - Dongolawi
      - Kenzi
  - Western Nubian
    - Birgid
    - Midob–Hill Nubian
      - Midob
      - Hill (Kordofan) Nubian

Other classifications differ, especially in the internal segmentation of Hill Nubian and in how “Central” and “Western” groupings are defined.

== Writing systems and orthography ==
Old Nubian used a Coptic-derived alphabet with additions and orthographic conventions adapted to Nubian phonology. In the modern period, Nubian languages have been written using multiple scripts and orthographic traditions depending on community and publication context, most commonly:

- Arabic script, sometimes using extended conventions to represent Nubian sounds not represented in Arabic.
- Latin-based orthographies, widely used in descriptive work and in some community materials.
- Old Nubian–based (Coptic-derived) orthographies, used in some cultural, educational, and revitalization efforts.

Because orthographic usage varies by language and author, published materials often describe the specific orthography being used.

=== Orthography ===
Modern Nubian languages have been written using multiple competing orthographies. Publications and community materials most commonly use (1) Arabic-script spellings (sometimes with extended conventions), (2) Latin-based spellings used in descriptive and pedagogical work, and (3) proposals that adapt the Old Nubian (Coptic-derived) writing tradition for modern use. Because conventions differ by language, author and intended audience, Nubian dictionaries and textbooks typically state the orthography they follow.

==== Selected letters and correspondences (illustrative) ====
The table below lists commonly cited Old Nubian / Coptic-derived characters, a typical scholarly romanization, and example Arabic-script renderings used in some modern publications. Not all letters have a stable Arabic-script equivalent, and values may differ across Nubian languages and orthographic systems.

Selected Old Nubian / Coptic-derived letters with common romanization and example Arabic-script renderings
Character	Romanized	Arabic-script letter used in some systems
ⲁ	a	ا
ⲃ	b	ب
ⲅ	g	ج
ⲇ	d	د
ⲉ	e	—
ⲍ	z	ز
ⲏ	ē	—
ⲑ	th	—
ⲓ	i	ي
ⲓ̈	ï	ي
ⲕ	k	ك
ⲗ	l	ل
ⲙ	m	م
ⲛ	n	ن
ⲟ	o	و
ⲡ	p	پ
ⲣ	r	ر
ⲥ	s	س
ⲧ	t	ت
ⲩ	u	و
ⲫ	f	ف
ⲱ	ō	و
ϣ	š	ش
ϩ	h	ه
ⳝ	c	—
ⲇⳝ	j	—
ⲧⳝ	ç	—
ⳟ	ŋ	—
ⳡ	ñ	—
ⳣ	w	و

Notes

- Old Nubian orthography includes additional conventions (such as digraphs) and edition-specific transliteration practices.
- Arabic-script spellings may use extended letters (e.g., پ) and diacritics; practices differ by language and author.

== Latin-based orthography (common conventions in modern descriptions) ==
Latin-based spellings used in descriptive work commonly represent vowel length and consonant length by doubling, and mark tone with diacritics where tone is written. A published sketch of Nobiin tone summarizes transcription conventions used in work based on Werner’s grammar, including tone marking with acute, grave and circumflex diacritics and length marking by doubling.

Common conventions in Latin-based Nubian orthographies (illustrated with Nobiin conventions)
Feature	Typical notation	Example (as written)	Notes
Vowel length	doubled vowel letters	aa, ee, ii, oo, uu	Used in the Nobiin transcription conventions summarized by Dingemanse (following Werner).
Consonant length (gemination)	doubled consonant letters	dd, kk, tt	Doubling is used to represent consonant length in the same conventions.
Tone (High / Low / Falling)	acute / grave / circumflex accents	á (H), à (L), â (HL)	Acute = high, grave = low, circumflex = falling in the system discussed by Dingemanse.
Conventional digraphs	digraph spellings for some sounds	sh, ny, ng	Used as orthographic conventions; IPA values depend on the author/system and language described.

== Research and documentation ==
Scholarly study of Nubian languages began in the 19th century and now includes comparative reconstruction, descriptive grammars and dictionaries, and sociolinguistic work on multilingualism and language shift. Researchers associated with Nubian description and classification include Lepsius, Reinisch, Meinhof, Thelwall, Bechhaus-Gerst, Rilly and others.

== Sources ==
- Ahmed, Asmaa M. I., and Muhammad J. A. Hashim (2004). "Suggestions for Writing Modern Nubian Languages" / "Competing Orthographies for Writing Nobiin Nubian", in Occasional Papers in the Study of Sudanese Languages No. 9. SIL/Sudan, Entebbe.
- Armbruster, Charles Hubert (1960). Dongolese Nubian: A Grammar. Cambridge: Cambridge University Press.
- Abdel-Hafiz, Ahmed Sokarno (1988). A Reference Grammar of Kunuz Nubian. PhD thesis, State University of New York at Buffalo.
- Breyer, Francis (2014). Einführung in die Meroitistik (in German). Lit. ISBN 978-3-643-12805-8.
- Browne, Gerald M. (2002). Old Nubian Grammar. Lincom Europa.
- Gerhards, Gabriel (2023). "Präarabische Sprachen der Ja'aliyin und Ababde in der europäischen Literatur des 19. Jahrhunderts". Der Antike Sudan (in German). 34. Sudanarchäologische Gesellschaft zu Berlin e.V: 135–152.
- Łajtar, Adam; Ochała, Grzegorz (2020). "Language Use and Literacy in Late Antique and Medieval Nubia". The Oxford Handbook of Ancient Nubia. Oxford University Press. pp. 787–806.
- Łajtar, Adam; Ochała, Grzegorz (2023). "Wall Inscriptions in the Upper Church at Banganarti: The "epigraphic habit" in Late Christian Nubia". In Marie Millet & Vincent Rondot (ed.). Kush: Proceedings of the 14th International Conference for Nubian Studies, Paris 2018. Vol. XX. Musée du Louvre. pp. 65–92.
- Rilly, Claude (2010). Le méroïtique et sa famille linguistique. Leuven: Peeters.
- Spaulding, Jay (1998). "Early Kordofan". In Endre Stiansen and Michael Kevane (ed.). Kordofan Invaded: Peripheral Incorporation in Islamic Africa. Brill. pp. 46–59. ISBN 978-90-04-11049-6.
- Spaulding, Jay (2006). "Pastoralism, Slavery, Commerce, Culture and the Fate of the Nubians of Northern and Central Kordofan Under Dar Fur Rule, "ca." 1750-"ca." 1850". The International Journal of African Historical Studies: 393–412.
- van Gerven Oei, Vincent (2023). "Finding Old Nubian, or, why we should divest from Western tongues". In Abdulhamit Arvas, Afrodesia & McCannon, Kris Trujillo (ed.). Critical Confessions Now. Springer Nature. pp. 157–165.
- Vantini, Giovanni (1975). Oriental Sources concerning Nubia. Heidelberger Akademie der Wissenschaften. OCLC 174917032.
