= Northern Eastern Sudanic languages =

Language family

Northern Eastern Sudanic
- Astaboran
- (undemonstrated)
- Geographic distribution: Sudan, Eritrea, Egypt, Chad
- Linguistic classification: Nilo-Saharan?: Eastern Sudanic?; Northern Eastern Sudanic
- Proto-language: Proto-Northern Eastern Sudanic
- Subdivisions: Nubian; Nara; Taman; Nyima; Meroitic? †

Language codes
- Glottolog: None

Eastern Sudanic languages: Group k (Northern Eastern Sudanic languages) (pink) Group n (Southern Eastern Sudanic languages) (yellow)

The Northern Eastern Sudanic, Eastern k Sudanic, Ek Sudanic, NNT or Astaboran languages may form a primary division of the proposed Eastern Sudanic family. They are characterised by having a /k/ in the first person singular pronoun "I/me", as opposed to the Southern Eastern Sudanic languages, which have an /n/. Nyima has yet to be conclusively linked to the other languages, and would appear to be the closest relative of Ek Sudanic rather than Ek Sudanic proper.

The most well-known language of this group is Nubian. According to Claude Rilly, the ancient Meroitic language appears on limited evidence to be closely related to the languages of this group.

A reconstruction of Proto-Northern Eastern Sudanic has also been proposed by Rilly (2010).

== Internal classification ==
Rilly (2009:2) provides the following internal structure for the Northern Eastern Sudanic languages.

- Northern East Sudanic
  - Nyima: Nyimang, Afitti
  - Taman: Tama, Mararit
  - Nara-Nubian
    - Nara
    - Meroitic-Nubian
      - Meroitic
      - Nubian
        - Western Nubian
          - Birgid
          - Midob, Kordofan Nubian
        - Nile Nubian
          - Old Dongolawi, Kenuzi, Dongolawi
          - Old Nubian, Nobiin

== External relationships ==
Based on morphological evidence such as tripartite number marking on nominals, Roger Blench (2021) suggests that the Maban languages may be closely related.

== See also ==
- List of Northern Eastern Sudanic reconstructions (Wiktionary)
