= Languages of the Central African Republic =

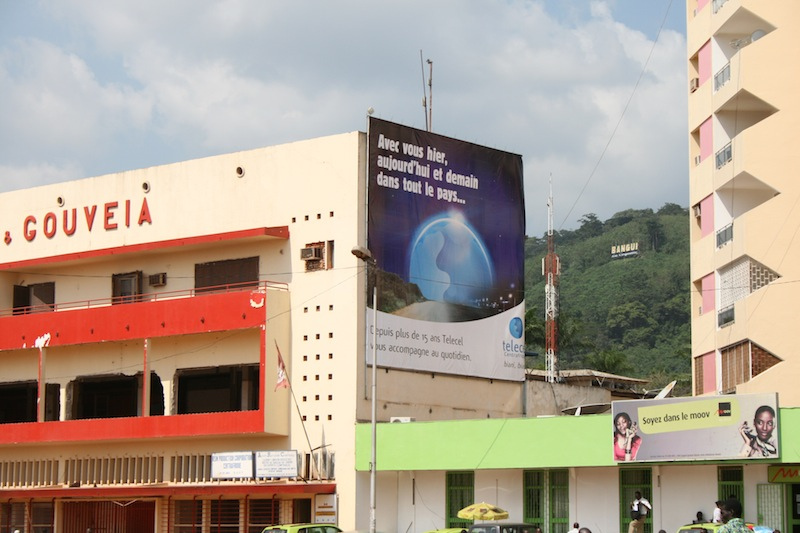
- French billboards in Bangui
- Official: French (Standard), Sango
- Indigenous: Ubangian languages, Runga, Bongo–Bagirmi languages, some Bantu languages
- Vernacular: African French
- Foreign: English, Russian, Arabic (Chadian Arabic)
- Signed: American Sign Language (Francophone African Sign Language)
- Keyboard layout: AZERTY

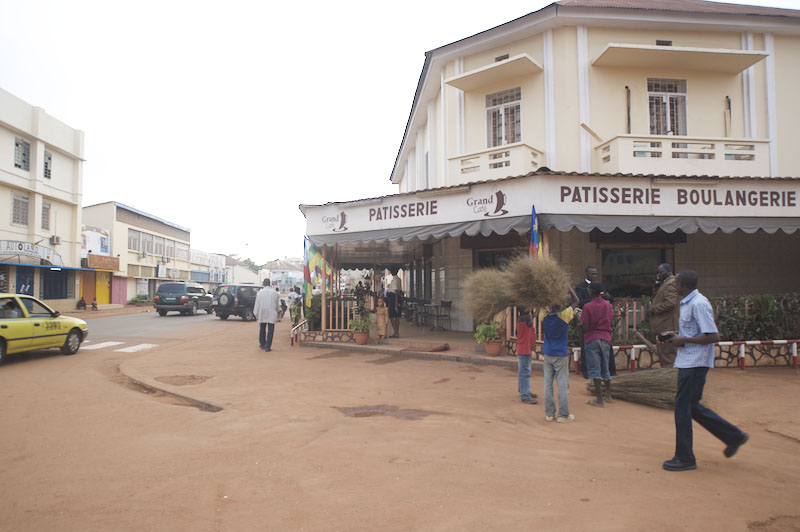
Signs in French in Bangui

The official languages of the Central African Republic are French and Sango. In total there are about 73 languages in the country; 67 living indigenous languages and 6 commonly spoken foreign languages.

== Official languages ==
=== Sango ===
Sango is a creole language spoken widely throughout the CAR, and is the dominant spoken language of the country. It functions as the country's vehicular language (or lingua franca). It is also spoken in cross-border communities in Chad and Cameroon, and in diaspora communities in Brazzaville and France. It is named for the Sango dialect of Ngbandi, which is the creole's lexifier. It is almost never written, though an official writing system was established in 1984. It is not used in education, except for some Protestant religious education.

Despite these limitations, it is widespread as a spoken language, with an estimated 2.5 million speakers. In 1994, 69% of pre-schoolers spoke only Sango. It is estimated that 90% of the CAR's population is able to speak Sango. The language has become the mother tongue of almost all children in Bangui. Sango became a national language in 1964 and an official language (alongside French) in 1991.

Prior to European colonization, there was no lingua franca in the region that is now the CAR. Instead, most people in the region were likely multilingual, speaking their native language and languages of nearby peoples with whom they had trade, social, or other ties. Sango emerged as a lingua franca after 1888, when Alphonse van Gèle's Belgian expedition up the Ubangi River initiated a wave of European colonial and resource-exploitation endeavors. By 1896, a pidgin language was reported to be in use along the river, and over time a creolized version of Sango would emerge as the lingua franca for the region. Sango uses words and structures from a variety of African languages, reflecting the diverse range of African workers the French used in their colonial endeavors in the area.

=== French ===
In the CAR, French is the language of writing and formal situations. In 2022, around 40% of the population over the age of 10 were estimated to be literate in French. Both governmental and religious education within the CAR has been primarily in French (with the exception of some Protestant education being provided in Sango). It dominates in formal settings, radio and television broadcasting, newspapers and other written settings, and government.

In the colonial era, French was viewed and used as the language of power. One Central African explained his desire to learn French during this era by lamenting, "When you don't know the French language, you aren't a human being," reflecting the French colonial authorities' view of the non-Francophone indigenous peoples as savages.

== Non-official languages ==
=== Ubangian languages ===
Many of the native languages of the CAR are Ubangian languages, including Ngbandi, the main contributor to the Sango creole. Ubangian languages are spoken throughout the CAR, especially in the western, southern, and central portions of the country. They also extend into some bordering countries, including eastern Cameroon, northern Democratic Republic of the Congo, and parts of South Sudan.

The exact relationship of the languages/dialects within Ubangian, as well as the group's relationship to the larger group of Niger–Congo languages, is still being studied. Three major groups of (possibly) Ubangian languages in the CAR are the Gbaya languages, spoken throughout western CAR; the Banda languages, spoken in central CAR; and the Zande languages, spoken in the southeast. Many of these languages are poorly documented and understudied. The Zande language, the namesake of the Zandic languages, has more than a million estimated speakers, though only some of them are in the CAR.

=== Other indigenous languages ===
Aiki (also known as Runga) is a Maban language, the southernmost member of that group, and is spoken in northern CAR. In the 1990s, it was estimated to have around 40,000 total speakers, with about half in the CAR and half in Chad.

Mbati, one of the northernmost Bantu languages, is spoken in the southwestern corner of the CAR around the town of Mbaïki, with around 60,000 speakers. UNESCO lists the Bantu languages Ukhwejo and Geme as "definitely endangered" languages of the CAR. It lists Bodo as "severely endangered".

Bongo–Bagirmi languages, a subgroup of Central Sudanic languages, are spoken primarily in the north, along the borders with Chad and Sudan. These represent some of the best studied Central Sudanic languages, and have provided useful historical insights into the spread of the languages and peoples of the northern regions of the CAR. There is also a geographic outlier among them, Birri, which is spoken in the southeast of the country. It has minimal documentation, and UNESCO lists Birri as "definitely endangered".

=== Other languages ===
Arabic is spoken in the northeastern portion of the country, where Sango is less common than Arabic. There are linguistic, religious, cultural, and geographic boundaries between this northeastern corner of the country and the bulk of the CAR, with stronger ties to neighboring countries. Chadian Arabic has generally been the dominant dialect, especially within religious settings among Muslims in the CAR. Sudanese Arabic and Juba Arabic are spoken by Fertit Arabs and Turku Arabs, respectively, in addition to tens of thousands of refugees from Sudan and South Sudan.

Education for the deaf in CAR uses Francophone African Sign Language, a variant of American Sign Language as introduced by the deaf American missionary Andrew Foster in the 1970s. Foster ran short summer courses on teacher education, based on ASL, in Francophone West and Central Africa. In practice, these teachers teaching a dialect with ASL signs but also with influences from spoken and written French.

== See also ==
- Demographics of the Central African Republic
- African French
