= Arabic-based pidgins and creoles =

Arabic-based pidgins

There have been a number of pidgins and creoles throughout history which are based on the Arabic language, including a number of new ones emerging today. These share a common ancestry, and incipient immigrant pidgins. Additionally, Maridi Arabic may have been an 11th-century pidgin.

== Arabic creoles and pidgins ==
The Arabic creoles and pidgins are:

- Bimbashi Arabic, a colonial-era pidgin of Anglo-Egyptian Sudan and the ancestor of the other Sudanic pidgins and creoles.
- Turku Arabic, a pidgin of colonial Chad
- Juba Arabic, spoken in South Sudan
- Nubi language, spoken in Uganda and Kenya
- Bongor Arabic, which could be a descendant of Turku Arabic, spoken in and around the town of Bongor, Chad.
  - There may be other Turku-like Arabic pidgins in Chad today, but they have not been described.
- Kalamo tetsitesy, used by Antemoro scribe in Fitovinany, Madagascar.
- Maxaa Tiri, also known as the Jabarti dialect. Arabic-Cushitic creole that developed in the 1800s.

== Immigrant pidgins in the Arabian Peninsula ==
In the modern era, pidgin Arabic is most notably used by the large number of migrants to Arab countries. Examples include:

- Gulf Pidgin Arabic, used by mostly immigrant laborers in the Arabian Peninsula (and not necessarily a single language variety).
- Jordanian Bengali Pidgin Arabic, used by Bengali immigrants in Jordan.
- Pidgin Madam, used by Sinhalese domestic workers in Lebanon.
- Romanian Pidgin Arabic, spoken by Romanian oil-field workers in Iraq between 1974 and 1990.

Due to the nature of pidgins, this list is likely incomplete. New pidgins may continue to develop and emerge due to language contact in the Arab world.

== Para-Arabic ==
Para-Arabic, also known as Pseudo-Arabic, is a descendant of the Arabic language that is no longer fully classified as Arabic. This is a mixed language that undergoes a process of code mixing or code switching where Arabic vocabulary and grammar or lexicon are mixed with other languages.

- Condet dialect, a dialect of the Betawi language with a more pronounced influence of Arabic vocabulary than other dialects, as well as a slight influence of Malay language. Arabic-Malay script (Jawi) was also quite often used by the indigenous people of Condet in East Jakarta, especially during the Dutch colonial era.

The Nubi language can also be considered a Para-Arabic language because its vocabulary is not entirely derived from Arabic but has absorbed many loans from Bantu languages. But it is excluded, because its lexicon is 90% derived from Arabic.

== See also ==
- Varieties of Arabic

== Sources ==
- Tosco, Mauro; Manfredi, Stefani (2013). "Pidgins and Creoles". In Owens, Jonathan (ed.). The Oxford Handbook of Arabic Linguistics. Oxford University Press. ISBN 9780199764136.
- Manfredi, Stefano and Mauro Tosco (eds.) 2014. Arabic-based Pidgins and Creoles. Special Issue of the Journal of Pidgin and Creole Languages, 29:2
