= Cyril Alexander Edward Lea =

British colonial officer

Cyril Alexander Edward Lea CBE (30 May 1902 – 13 April 1993) was a British colonial officer in the Anglo-Egyptian Sudan in the first half of the 20th century. He is known for his famous diary which he called his "trek journals." They provide a glimpse of how British civil servants understood their role in the administration of native peoples.

== Family and early life ==
Lea was born in Cranleigh, Surrey to Edward Thomas Lea and Zoe Monica Holland Millard Lea. He was educated at Eton College and King's College, Cambridge.

== Education and career ==
After completing his education, Lea received an appointment to the Sudan Political Service in November, 1926. He was posted to Kassala province as probationer Assistant District Commissioner from 1927 to 1929. He participated in the then governor's project of constructing "Native Administration." This involved working with the great Sheikh Awad El Kerim Abu Sinn, chief of the Shukria tribe.

In 1929, Lea was transferred to the secretariat in Khartoum. Lea impressed Harold MacMichael, the doyen of the Political Service, with his administrative skills and MacMichael was determined to help Lea draft concise and well worded amendments for his administrative work. Beginning in 1930, Lea was appointed Assistant District Commissioner in Dar El Kababish in Kordofan. It was during his tenure in Kordofan that he began to keep his famous "trek journals", detailed accounts of how he worked with tribes in the region: the four nomadic tribes of Kababish, Kawahla, Howawir and Maganiin, along with the sedentary Nuba of the Northern Hills. The purpose of these journals was to record any incidents that involved injustice, lawlessness, or discontent among the peoples. As Lea wrote, "He must behave as a guest among Arab hosts."

The British government in the Sudan was concerned about two facets of tribal life: the large number of unregistered guns and the custom of slavery. Guns had been issued to the tribes during the joint British-Egyptian invasion of Darfur in 1916. Many of these arms were not returned after the invasion. The government's policy was that only the tribal leaders should have guns. As for slavery, it was a fact of life, especially in the dry season when flocks needed a great deal of well water. The government attempted to address this issue by providing pulleys and leather buckets which could be used to obtain well water without human labor. Nevertheless, slavery continued as a social institution, now under British supervision, and the government was careful to regulate conduct between master and slave.

Lea noted that the world-wide Great Depression affected the Anglo-Egyptian Sudan in 1931. The value of cotton, gum arabic, hides and animals fell. It was nearly impossible for the administration to collect herd taxes. This led to a reduction in government oversight of various regions.

During the Second World War, Lea was stationed in Abyssinia and in Libya. He concluded his Sudan career in the Finance Department, retiring in 1952.

In the 1952 New Year Honours, Lea was awarded the Commander of the Most Excellent Order of the British Empire (Civil Division) (Overseas).
