= Homa people =

Ethnic group of South Sudan

Total population
- c. 4,700

Regions with significant populations
- South Sudan

Languages
- Sudanese Arabic

Religion
- Predominantly Islam; minority Christianity

The Homa people are an ethnic group of South Sudan. The Homa speak Sudanese Arabic and number around 4,700. Around 80% are muslims and 5% are christians.
