= Chadian Arabic =

Variant of Arabic spoken in Chad

- Shuwa
- لهجة تشادية
- Native to: Chad, Cameroon, Niger, Nigeria
- Ethnicity: Baggara Arabs
- Speakers: L1: 2.6 million (2005–2023); L2: 5.8 million (2013–2023); Total: 8.3 million (2005–2023)
- Language family: Afro-Asiatic: Semitic; West Semitic; Central Semitic; Arabic; Chadian Arabic
- Writing system: Arabic alphabet

Language codes
- ISO 639-3: shu
- Glottolog: chad1249
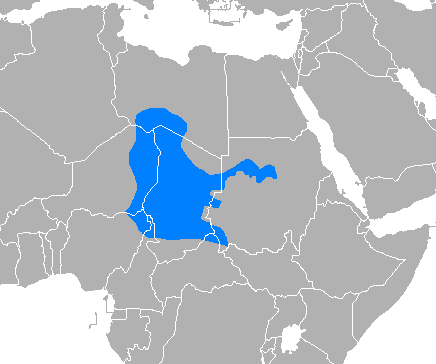

Chadian Arabic (Arabic: لهجة تشادية), also known as Shuwa Arabic, (Note: The term "Shuwa Arabic" in a strict meaning only refers to the Nigerian dialects of this particular language, but is not used by those speakers themselves.) Western Sudanic Arabic, or West Sudanic Arabic (WSA), is a variety of Arabic and the first language of 1.9 million people in Chad, both rural and urban inhabitants. Most of its speakers live in central and southern Chad. Its range is an east-to-west oval in the Sahel. Nearly all of this territory is within Chad and parts of Western Sudan in Darfur along the border region. It is also spoken elsewhere in the vicinity of Lake Chad in the countries of Cameroon, Nigeria and Niger. Finally, it is spoken in slivers of the Central African Republic. In addition, this language serves as a lingua franca in much of the region. In most of its range, it is one of several local languages and often not among the major ones.

== Naming and classification ==
This language does not have a native name shared by all its speakers, beyond "Arabic". It arose as the native language of nomadic cattle herders (baggāra, Standard Arabic baqqāra بَقَّارَة, means 'cattlemen', from baqar).

In 1913, a French colonial administrator in Chad, Henri Carbou, wrote a grammar of the local dialect of the Ouaddaï highlands, a region of eastern Chad on the border with Sudan. In 1920, a British colonial administrator in Nigeria, Gordon Lethem, wrote a grammar of the Borno dialect, in which he noted that the same language was spoken in Kanem (in western Chad) and Ouaddaï (in eastern Chad). Since its publication, this language has become widely cited academically as "Shuwa Arabic"; however, the term "Shuwa" was in use only among non-Arab people in Borno State, Nigeria. Around 2000, the academic term "Western Sudanic Arabic" was proposed by a specialist in the language, Jonathan Owens. The geographical sense of "Sudanic" invoked by Owens is not the modern country of Sudan, but the Sahel in general, the West African region Arabs dubbed Bilad al-Sudan "the Land of the Blacks" as far back as the medieval era. In the era of British colonialism in Africa, colonial administrators too used "the Sudan" to mean the entire Sahel.

Based on population movements and shared genealogical histories, Sudanic and Egyptian varieties of Arabic have traditionally been classified into a larger Egypto-Sudanic grouping. However, alternative analysis of linguistic features supports the general independence of Sudanic Arabic varieties from Egyptian Arabic.

== Distribution and varieties ==
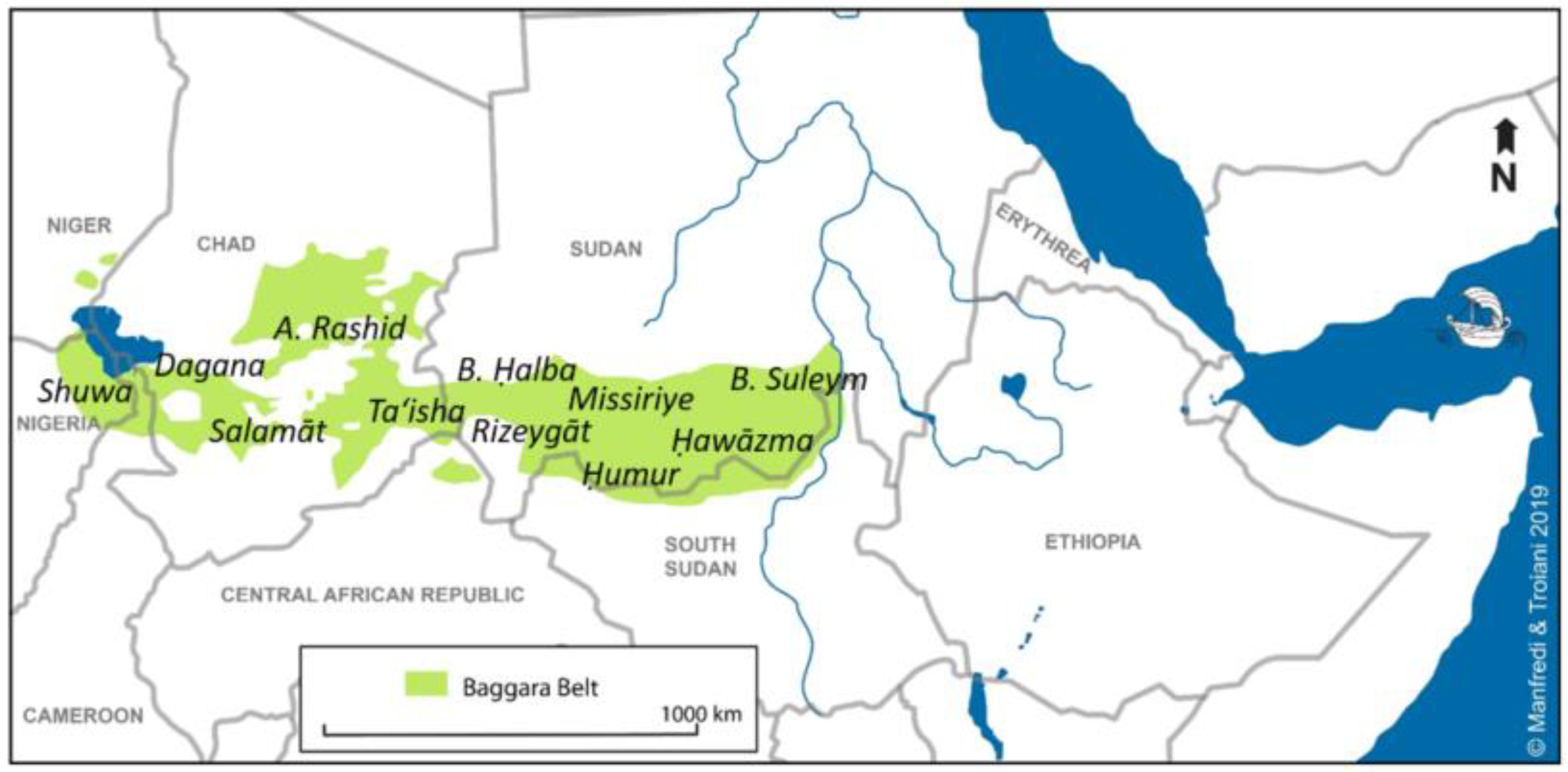
Baggara belt.

=== Dialects ===
Two clear subdialects of Western Sudanic Arabic are discernable:

- Bagirmi Arabic – spoken from eastern Nigeria to Chad in the southern fringe of the area. Characterized by syllable final stress in forms such as katáb 'he wrote'.
- Urban varieties of Chad – spoken in Ndjamena and Abbeche, and characterized by simplification tendencies.

=== Speakers by country ===
==== Chad ====
The majority of speakers live in southern Chad between 10 and 14 degrees north latitude. In Chad, it is the local language of the national capital, N'Djamena, and its range encompasses such other major cities as Abéché, Am Timan, and Mao. It is the native language of 12% of Chadians. Chadian Arabic's associated lingua franca is widely spoken in Chad, so that Chadian Arabic and its lingua franca combined are spoken by somewhere between 40% and 60% of the Chadian population.

==== Sudan ====
In Sudan, it is spoken in the southwest, in southern Kordofan and southern Darfur, but excluding the cities of al-Ubayyid and al-Fashir.

==== Nigeria ====
In Nigeria, it spoken by 10% of the population of Maiduguri, the capital of Borno State, and by residents elsewhere in Borno State. It is locally known as Shuwa Arabic. As of 2024, a total of 265,000 Chadian Arabic speakers are found in Nigeria.

==== Other ====
Its range in other African countries includes a sliver of the Central African Republic, the northern half of its Vakaga Prefecture, which is adjacent to Chad and Sudan; a sliver of South Sudan at its border with Sudan; and the environs of Lake Chad spanning three other countries, namely part of Nigeria's (Borno State), Cameroon's Far North Region, and in the Diffa Department of Niger's Diffa Region. The number of speakers in Niger is estimated to be 12,900 people.

== History ==
How this Arabic language arose is unknown. In 1994, Braukämper proposed that it arose in Chad starting in 1635 by the fusion of a population of Arabic speakers with a population of Fulani nomads.

During the colonial era, a form of pidgin Arabic known as Turku was used as a lingua franca. There are still Arabic pidgins in Chad today, such as Bongor Arabic, however, most of them have not been described, so it is not known if they descend from Turku.

== Phonology ==
Consonants
		Labial		Dental/Alveolar		Palatal	Velar	Uvular	Glottal
		plain	emph.	plain	emph.	Palatal	Velar	Uvular	Glottal
Nasal		m	mˤ	n		ɲ	ŋ		
Plosive/ Affricate	voiceless	p		t		tʃ	k	q	ʔ
Plosive/ Affricate	voiced	b		d	dˤ	dʒ	ɡ		
Plosive/ Affricate	implosive				ɗˤ				
Fricative	voiceless	f		s	sˤ	ʃ	x		h
Fricative	voiced			z					
Tap/Trill				r	rˤ				
Approximant				l	lˤ	j	w		

Vowels
	Front	Back
Close	i iː	u uː
Mid	e eː	o oː
Open	a aː	

Notes:

- Old Arabic */ɣ/ > /q/, /x/
- Old Arabic */ħ/ > /h/
- Old Arabic */ʕ/ > /ʔ/
- Old Arabic */ṭ/ > /ɗ/ (ɗˤ)

It is characterized by the loss of the pharyngeals [ħ] and [ʕ], the interdental fricatives [ð], [θ] and [ðˤ], and diphthongs. But it also has /lˤ/, /rˤ/ and /mˤ/ as extra phonemic emphatics. Some examples of minimal pairs for such emphatics are /ɡallab/ "he galloped", /ɡalˤlˤab/ "he got angry"; /karra/ "he tore", /karˤrˤa/ "he dragged"; /amm/ "uncle", /amˤmˤ/ "mother". In addition, Nigerian Arabic has the feature of inserting an /a/ after gutturals (ʔ,h,x,q).

== Grammar ==
A notable feature is the change of Standard Arabic Form V from tafaʕʕal(a) to alfaʕʕal; for example, the word taʔallam(a) becomes alʔallam. The first person singular perfect tense of verbs is different from its formation in other Arabic dialects in that it does not have a final t. Thus, the first person singular of the verb katab is katáb, with stress on the second syllable of the word, whereas the third-person singular is kátab, with stress on the first syllable.

== Vocabulary ==
The following is a sample vocabulary:

Words of Arabic origin
Chadian Arabic	Meaning	Origin
أدان ʔadān	ear	from آذان ʔāḏān, the plural form of أذن ʔuḏn
المي ʔalmi	water	from ماء māʔ with a frozen definite article
إيد ʔīd	hand	from يد yad
عيد ʔīd	festival, celebration	from عيد ʕīd with regular change of ʕ to ʔ
جدادة jidāde	chicken (singulative)	from دجاجة dajāja with metathesis
شدراي šadarāy	tree (singulative)	from شجرة šajara with dissimilation
Words of foreign origin
بعشوم baʔashōm	jackal	from Beja ba'aashoob
بيك bīk	ballpoint pen	from French bic
وتير watīr	car	from French voiture

== See also ==
- Languages of Chad
- Languages of Cameroon
- Varieties of Arabic
