= Cymbeline (South Sudan Theatre Company) =

Cymbeline, originally written in English by William Shakespeare, is a play in the Juba Arabic language adapted and staged by the South Sudan Theatre Company under the direction of Joseph Abuk and Derik Uya Alfred, and which premiered at the Globe in London in 2012.

== Overview ==
The play consists of actors and different settings as it focuses on a war ravaged people and seeks to reinvent the course of the nation for a better development through arts and literature.

=== Origin ===
The plot of Cymbeline now is recognized as the local group performed it in London called the South Sudan Theatre Company that has rejuvenated the film and acts of drama sector in the world's youngest country.

The play is part of the 'Globe to Globe' programme of 37 plays in 37 languages.

The plot is being explained and acted upon and the people responsible take the setting and pick their characters such that they can showcase the drama to the available audience that are watching and listening while picking a lesson or two to learn from.

According to UNICEF, the drama encompasses the local language of Juba Arabic and addresses the people with their audible and understandable language for the good of the local people which contributes to peace building and information.
