= Lahawin people =

Lahawin is an ethnic minority of Sudan. his minority mainly follows Islam. They speak Arabic. They lead a nomadic lifestyle, residing along the river Atbara on Northern Sudan, downstream to north Khashmalgirba. They are Pastoralist and move in Sudan around Kassala state and Butana region.
