= South Sudan Theatre Company =

The South Sudan Theatre Company is a theatre company established in 2012, shortly after South Sudan gained independence in 2011.

== Overview ==
According to CNN news, the play Cymbeline can now be acted and played on a regular basis through the thorough study of the plot and be showcased both locally and internationally through the help of the internet a world of technology today.

The theatre company has announced the efforts to make the play feel natural and related to the South Sudanese people by scripting the play in Juba Arabic.
