= Pidgin Madam =

Sinhalese-Lebanese Arabic mixed language

- Native to: Lebanon
- Language family: Arabic-based creole: Pidgin Madam

Language codes
- ISO 639-3: –
- Glottolog: pidg1252

Pidgin Madam is a pidgin language that is a mixture of Lebanese Arabic and traditional Sinhalese. Since the oil boom of the 1970s, several forms of Pidgin Arabic, such as Gulf Pidgin Arabic, evolved to become a popular form of communication due to foreign workers coming from South and South Eastern Asian countries. These workers tend to live and work in major cities.

== History ==
Pidgin Madam is largely spoken by Sri Lankan women working in the Levant area of the Middle East. Its name comes from the fact that it is mainly used between Lebanese "Madames" and Sinhalese domestic workers. Pidgin Madam is locally recognized in the areas where the language is spoken. There are an estimated 80,000 Sri Lankan Domestic workers in Lebanon, but the exact number of speakers of the pidgin is unknown. The pidgin tends to be spoken by all Sinahalese workers in this region, apart from areas where an English Pidgin is more popular.

== Sociological context ==
Sri Lankan woman started to arrive specifically in Lebanon in the late 1970s, and represent three quarters of immigrant female domestic workers in Lebanon. The workers were placed with large upper-class Lebanese families (typically with many young children) through recruitment agencies, and would be contracted under 3 year agreements. These domestic workers tend to live with the family and may participate in special occasions such as holidays abroad, or religious celebrations. Workers are usually confined with the family within the 3 years, and may renew their contract with the same family if a close relationship is established between the family, children, and worker. The worker may take on tasks to help the family such as laundry, preparing food, and other day-to-day chores. A family may use complex forms of communication to purposely exclude the worker from communication.

=== Language acquisition ===
The employer "Madam" takes charge of educating the newly arrived domestic worker by introducing her to basic, simple sentences, emphasizing communication through eye contact and touch. Typically after 6-7 months, the pidgin has evolved in a personalized way to allow communication between the employers and the worker. As time evolves and the worker becomes more comfortable and familiarized with the new environment and means of communication, reliance on physical gesturing to assist communication diminishes.

== Linguistic context ==
Lebanese Arabic is a Semitic language belonging to the Levantine dialectal group of Arabic, with a long historical contact to Syriac. There is French influence over the language due to the colonial history of France in the Levant. Sinhala is an Indo-Aryan language, situated within a dravidophone environment, and is influenced by Elu, an ancestral relative.

== Linguistic features ==
There is a third person feminine singular, which is the most common designation.

The pidgin has "imperative forms that are used as a verbal base, forms of the modal incompleteness which, in fact, are the forms that are hard inside the prohibitive, minus the article".
