= Turku Arabic =

Arabic-based creole language formerly spoken in Chad

- Native to: Chad
- Language family: Arabic-based creole: Turku Arabic
- Early form: Bimbashi Arabic

Language codes
- ISO 639-3: –
- Glottolog: turk1244

Turku Arabic or simply just Turku is an extinct variant of Bimbashi Arabic that served as a lingua franca in Chad. It is the ancestor to Bongor Arabic and potentially other Arabic pidgins spoken in Chad today, but since they have not been described, it is unclear whether they are direct descendants of Turku.

== History ==
Turku emerged as a regional variant of Bimbashi Arabic when Bimbashi-speaking enslaved soldiers were forced to relocate from Sudan to Chad after the abolition of slavery in Anglo-Egyptian Sudan in 1879. The primary lexifier of Turku is Sudanese Arabic, and it is also heavily influenced by Sango and Sara-Bagirmi languages, from which most of its loanwords originate. Although not much is known about Turku, a dictionary and a phrasebook were published in 1926.

== Grammar ==
Turku had at least 2 tense/aspect markers: gahed (a continuous aspect particle) and bi- (a future tense particle). Similar particles are also found in Juba Arabic and Nubi.

== Vocabulary ==
Turku	Origin	English
adinbang	From Bagirmi ádim mbàŋ	eunuch
gao	From Sar gáw	hunter
ngari	From Mbay ngàrì	manioc
kay	From Sango kâî	paddle
itenan	From French lieutenant	lieutenant
pfil	From Arabic فيل fīl	elephant
