= Nubi language =

Sudanese Arabic-based creole language

Nubi Arabic
- Kinubi
- كي-نوبي
- Native to: Uganda, Kenya
- Ethnicity: Ugandan Nubians, Kenyan Nubians
- Speakers: 50,000 (2014–2019)
- Language family: Arabic-based creole: Nubi Arabic
- Early form: Bimbashi Arabic
- Writing system: Arabic

Language codes
- ISO 639-3: kcn
- Glottolog: nubi1253
- ELP: Nubi

The Nubi language (also called Ki-Nubi, Arabic: كي-نوبي, romanized: kī-nūbī) is a Sudanese Arabic-based creole language spoken in Uganda around Bombo, and in Kenya around Kibera, by the Ugandan Nubians, many of whom are descendants of Emin Pasha's Sudanese soldiers who were settled there by the British colonial administration. It was spoken by about 15,000 people in Uganda in 1991 (according to the census), and an estimated 10,000 in Kenya; another source estimates about 50,000 speakers as of 2001. 90% of the lexicon derives from Arabic, but the grammar has been simplified, as has the sound system. Nairobi has the greatest concentration of Nubi speakers. Nubi has the prefixing, suffixing and compounding processes also present in Arabic.

Many Nubi speakers are Kakwa who came from the Nubian region, first into Equatoria, and from there southwards into Uganda and the Democratic Republic of the Congo. They rose to prominence under Ugandan President Idi Amin, who was Kakwa.

Jonathan Owens argues that Nubi constitutes a major counterexample to Derek Bickerton's theories of creole language formation, showing "no more than a chance resemblance to Bickerton's universal creole features" despite fulfilling perfectly the historical conditions expected to lead to such features. Scholars (Sebit, 2023) have suggested that the Nubi language was the main point of unity among the Nubi community in east Africa, to survive the hardship they experienced from different community components.

== History ==
Nubi is a creole that emerged in the late nineteenth century as spoken by the Egyptian army's Sudanese troops and camp followers. The groups that were native speakers of different languages used a simplified form of Arabic as a medium of communication. The early versions of the contact language bear the names Mongalla Arabic and Bimbashi Arabic. The origin of the word "Nubi" is unknown. The word can be derived from Nūba, in reference to the Nuba Mountains, junūb, as used to mean "south", or as a word that historically referred to non-Arab Muslim people.

After demobilization, most of the people in these groups were relocated to southern Sudan, Kenya, and Uganda. The next generation learned the Arabic pidgin as their native tongue, resulting in the creolization of Nubi. The distinct Nubi identity developed over time with the blend of Islamic religious orientation and collective cultural components, such as clothing, food, and crafts. Some of the Arabic pidgins that are similar to Nubi are Juba Arabic, still spoken in South Sudan, and the extinct Turku variety.

Today, Nubi (or Kinubi, with the Swahili prefix ki-) is still mainly used in Kenya and Uganda, particularly in Kibera and Bombo. Some people are multilingual, employing Nubi, Swahili, and English. Swahili has influenced Nubi at the lexical, phonological, and morphological levels. The development of a standardized form of writing and the recording of oral literature are taking place within the culture.

== Phonology ==
=== Vowels ===
There are five vowels in Nubi. Vowels are not distinguished by length except in at least two exceptions from Kenyan Nubi (which are not present in Ugandan dialects) where bara means "outside" and is an adverb while baara means "the outside" and is a noun, and also where saara meaning "bewitch" is compared to sara meaning "herd, cattle". Despite this, there is a tendency for vowels in stressed syllables to be registered as long vowels.

	Front	Back
High	i	u
Mid	e	o
Low	a	

Each of the vowels has multiple allophones and the exact sound of the vowel depends on the surrounding consonants.

=== Consonants ===
		Bilabial	Dental	Alveolar	Post alveolar	Velar	Uvular	Pharyngeal	Glottal
Nasal		m		n	ɲ	(ŋ)			
Plosive/ Affricate	voiceless	p		t	tʃ	k	(q)		(ʔ)
Plosive/ Affricate	voiced	b		d	dʒ	ɡ			
Fricative	voiceless	f	(θ)	s	ʃ	(x)		(ħ)	h
Fricative	voiced	v	(ð)	z					
Rhotic				r	(ɽ)				
Lateral				l					
Approximant		w			j	(w)			

Speakers may use Standard Arabic phonemes for words for which the Arabic pronunciation has been learned. The retroflex version of the /r/ sound may also occur and some dialects use /l/ in its place. Geminates are very unusual in Nubi. These less common phonemes are shown in brackets.

Ineke Wellens gives the following orthography for Nubi where it differs from the IPA symbols: /ʃ/ = sh; /tʃ/ = ch; /dʒ/ = j; /ɲ/ = ny; /w/ = w or u; /j/ = y or i; /θ/ = th; /ð/ = dh; /x/ = kh; /ħ/ = ḥ.

=== Syllable structure ===
Syllables typically have a CV, VC, V or CVC structure with VC only occurring in initial syllables. Final and initial CC occur only in a few specific examples such as skul which means "school" or sems which means "sun".

Stress can change the meaning of words for example saba means "seven" or "morning" depending on whether the stress is on the first or second syllables respectively. Vowels are often omitted in unstressed, final syllables and sometime even the stressed final "u" in the passive form may be deleted after "m", "n", "l", "f" or "b". This can cause syllables to be realigned even across words.

== Grammar ==
=== Nominals ===
Nouns are inflected by number only (taking a singular or plural form) although for most nouns this does not represent a morphological change. Jonathan Owens gives 5 broad inflectional categories of nouns:

1. Nouns which undergo a stress shift when the plural is formed.
2. Nouns which undergo apophony.
3. Nouns which take a suffix and undergo a stress shift in the plural form.
4. Nouns which form the plural by suppletion
5. Bantu loan-words which take different prefixes in the singular and plural forms

The table below shows examples of each type of pluralisation. The apostrophe has been placed before the stressed syllable:

Type of Pluralisation	Singular Form	Plural Form	English Translation
1	yo'wele	yowe'le	boy(s)
2	ke'bir	ku'bar	big [thing(s)]
3	'tajir	taji'rin	rich person(s)
3	'seder	sede'ra	tree(s)
4	'marya	nus'wan	woman / women^{1}
5	muze	waze	old man / old men

^{1}Nuswan may be supplemented by a suffix as if it were type 3, thus, nuswana could also mean "women".

Adjectives follow the noun and some adjectives have singular and plural forms which must agree with the noun. Adjectives may also take the prefixes al, ali, ab or abu which mark them as habitual. Possessor nouns follow the possessed, with a particle ta placed in between. In the case of inalienable possession the particle is omitted.

== See also ==
- Bimbashi Arabic

== Bibliography ==
- Boretzky, Norbert (1988). "Zur grammatischen Struktur des Nubi". In Boretzky, Norbert; Enninger, Werner; Stolz, Thomas (eds.). Beiträge zum 4. Essener Kolloquium über 'Sprachkontakt, Sprachwandel, Sprachwechsel, Sprachtod' vom 9. und 10. Oktober 1987 an der Universität Essen [Contributions to the 4th Essen Symposium on 'Language Contact, Language Change, Language Shift, Language Death' Held at the University of Essen on 9-10 October 1987]. Bochum-Essener Beiträge zur Sprachwandelforschung. Vol. 5. Bochum: Brockmeyer. pp. 45–88.
- Heine, Bernd (1982). The Nubi Language of Kibera – an Arabic Creole. Berlin: Dietrich Reimer.
- Luffin, Xavier (2004). Kinubi Texts. Munich: Lincom Europa. ISBN 9783895868351.
- Luffin, Xavier (2004). "Les verbes d'état, d'existence et de possession en kinubi (créole de base arabe)". Zeitschrift für Arabische Linguistik. 43. Wiesbaden: Harrassowitz Verlag: 43–66. JSTOR 43525773.
- Luffin, Xavier (2005). Un créole arabe : le kinubi de Mombasa, Kenya. Lincom Studies in Pidgin and Creole Linguistics. Vol. 7. Munich: Lincom Europa.
- Musa-Wellens, I. (1994). A descriptive sketch of the verbal system of the Nubi language, spoken in Bombo, Uganda (MA thesis). University of Nijmegen.
- Nakao, Shuichiro. 2018. "Mountains do not meet, but men do." Arabic in Contact, edited by Stefano Mandfredi and Mauro Tosco, 275-294. John Benjamins Publishing.
- Nhial, J. "Kinubi and Juba Arabic. A comparative study". In Hurriez, S. H.; Bell, H. (eds.). Directions in Sudanese Linguistics and Folklore. Khartoum: Institute of African and Asian Studies. pp. 81–94.
- Owens, Jonathan (1978). Aspects of Nubi Syntax (PhD thesis). University of London.
- Owens, Jonathan (1985). "The origins of East African Nubi". Anthropological Linguistics. 27: 229–271.
- Owens, Jonathan (1991). "Nubi, genetic linguistics, and language classification". Anthropological Linguistics. 33: 1–30.
- Owens, Jonathan (1997). "Arabic-based pidgins and creoles". In Thomason, S.G. (ed.). Contact languages: A wider perspective. Amsterdam: John Benjamins. pp. 125–172.
- Wellens, Inneke Hilda Werner (2001). An Arabic creole in Africa: the Nubi language of Uganda (PDF) (PhD thesis). University of Nijmegen. Archived from the original (PDF) on 13 October 2022.
