= Emirati Arabic =

Arabic varieties of the UAE

- Al Ramsa
- اللهجة الإماراتية
- Native to: United Arab Emirates
- Region: Arabia
- Ethnicity: Arabs (Emiratis)
- Native speakers: 1.5 million (2024)
- Language family: Afro-Asiatic: Semitic; West; Central; Arabic; Peninsular; Gulf; Emirati Arabic
- Dialects: Dhabyaniya (ar: اللهجة الظبيانية); Quwainiya (ar: القيوينية); Hadhr al-Sahel al-Gharbi (ar: حضر الساحل الغربي); Hadhr al-Dhafra (ar: حضر الظفرة); Hadhr al-Sahel al-Sharqi (ar: حضر الساحل الشرقي); Hadhr Ras al-Khaimah (ar: حضر راس الخيمة); Emirati Bedouin Arabic (ar: لهجة بدو الإمارات); Jibaliya (ar: لهجة المناطق الجبلية); Lahjat Dibba (ar: لهجة دبا); Emirati Pidgin Arabic (ar: العربي المبسط الاماراتي)
- Writing system: Arabic alphabet

Official status
- Official language in: United Arab Emirates

Language codes
- ISO 639-3: afb
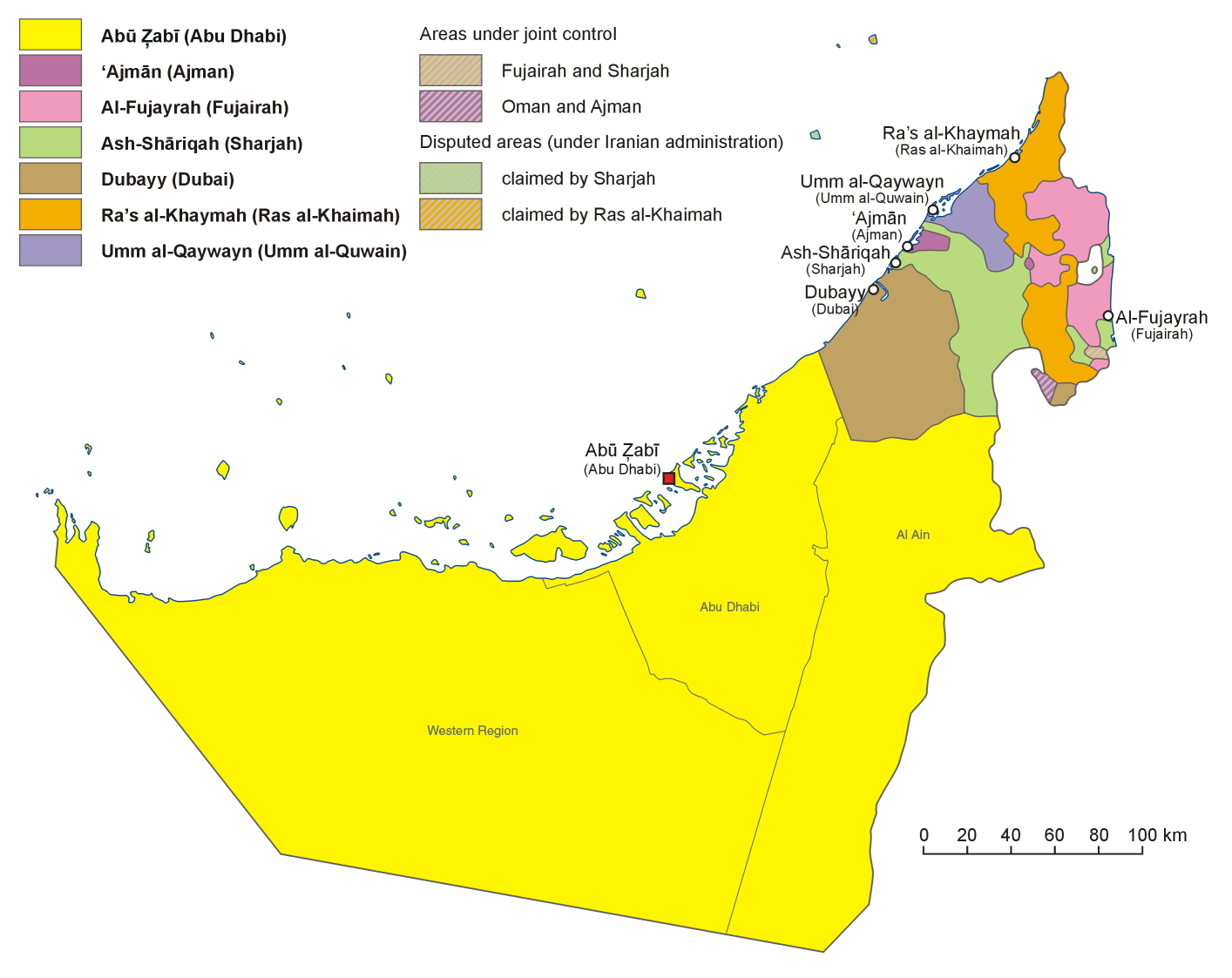

Emirati Arabic (Arabic: اللهجة الإماراتية, romanized: al-Lahjah al-Imārātiyyah), also known as Al Ramsa (Arabic: الرمسة, romanized: a-Ramsa), refers to a group of Arabic dialectal varieties spoken by the Emiratis native to the United Arab Emirates that share core characteristics with specific phonological, lexical, and morphosyntactic features and a certain degree of intra-dialectal variation, which is mostly geographically defined. It incorporates grammatical properties of smaller varieties within the UAE, generally of tribal nature, which can be roughly divided into a couple of broader sub-varieties: the first spoken in the Northern Emirates of Dubai, Sharjah, Ajman, Umm Al Quwain, and the western part of Ras al-Khaimah; the second in the eastern part of the country, mainly in Fujairah, Dibba, Khor Fakkan, Hatta, Kalba, and the eastern part of Ras al-Khaimah, some of the dialects in this group bear similarity to neighbouring Omani varieties; the third in Abu Dhabi including the oasis city of Al Ain, the dialect is also seen in the Omani region of Al-Buraimi. Emirati Arabic varieties can also be distinguished based on environmental factors, including variations associated with Bedouin communities, coastal, agricultural, and mountainous regions.

Additionally, a pidgin form of Emirati Arabic exists, predominantly utilized by blue-collar workers in the UAE. This linguistic variant, which is closely related to other variants of Gulf Pidgin Arabic, amalgamates elements of Emirati Arabic with other languages like English, Farsi, Hindi, Urdu, and Tagalog. Serving as a simplified means of communication, Emirati Pidgin Arabic facilitates basic interactions in workplaces, construction sites, and similar environments where multilingual communication is necessary.

Speakers of Emirati Arabic identify themselves as speakers of a distinct variety (as compared with other neighbouring dialects such as Qatari or Kuwaiti Arabic), based on several phonological, morphological, and syntactic properties that distinguish Emirati Arabic from other Gulf Arabic varieties.

Emirati Arabic dialects are believed to have evolved from the linguistic variations spoken by ancient pre-Islamic Arabian tribes in the region, particularly the Azd, Qays, and Tamim, as noted by Emirati linguist and historian Ahmed Obaid.

== Diglossia and dialectal variety ==
Due to the coexistence of the Modern Standard Arabic (high language) and the dialect (low language), it is possible to speak about diglossia of the Arabic language.

The UAE, extending over a total area of about 83,000 km² and hosting more than 200 different nationalities, represent one of the nations with the largest aggregation of ethnic groups in the world. Archaeological excavations have shown that in this area several Semitic races were established. It follows that the spoken language, the Emirati dialect, includes some different dialectal shades. It represents the communication tool used by the overwhelming majority of the population, although people of good cultural level are able to express themselves in official Arabic. Notwithstanding the recent filling up of urban areas to the detriment of rural ones has led to a growing decrease in local dialectal variations, we can still identify three main areas of different shades of the Emirate dialect: Abu Dhabi (including Al Ain, the western region and islands), Dubai and the Northern Emirates (including Sharjah, Ajman, Umm al-Quwain and part of Ras al-Khaimah) and the east coast (including Fujairah, Khor Fakkan, and the remainder of Ras al-Khaimah). To give a practical example, the word "mub (مب)" a negation which simply translates to "Not" should be mentioned with its variations: "maš" (مش)" in Abu Dhabi, "mub" (مب)" in the Northern Emirates and "mā" (ما)" in the East Coast.

== Phonology ==
In the spoken Emirati dialect a sound change is exhibited in where the MSA [d͡ʒ] is attested as Emirati [j] and the MSA [k] is attested as [t͡ʃ]. There is also another sound change in where the MSA [q] is [g] and can further change into [d͡ʒ]. These features are also shared with other Gulf and Peninsular varieties.

English	Standard Modern Arabic	Emirati Arabic
Chicken	/da.d͡ʒaːd͡ʒ/	/diˈjaːj/
Fish	/sa.mak/	/sɪˈmat͡ʃ/
Coffee	/qah.wa/	/gahˈwa/
Near	/qa.riːb/	/d͡ʒɪˈriːb/ , /gɪrˈiːb/
Mountain	/d͡ʒa.bal/	/jɪbal/, d͡ʒabal
Dog	/'kalb/	/t͡ʃalb/, /'kalb/

There is also a guide book for the Arabic dialect of the Emirates, Spoken Emirati, and an Italian version, Dialetto Emiratino, edited by Nico de Corato together with Hanan Al Fardan and Abdulla Al Kaabi, authors of the original English version.

== Loanwords ==
The unification of the UAE has heavily contributed to making changes to the local dialect. Due to globalisation, the Emirati dialect has received influences from other Arabic dialects and foreign languages. Some technical words have often an English origin and have arrived in the Persian Gulf through interchange with the English and Indian population, and then have been adapted to an Arabic pronunciation.

Some examples of loanwords in Emirati Arabic:

Loanwords
Transliterated Word	Meaning in English	Language Borrowed from
soman	equipment	Persian
dreːˈwæl	driver	English
siːˈdæ	front	Urdu
ˈxaːshuːˌgæh	spoon	Turkish
dæriːˈshæ	window	Persian
buʃˈkar	servant	Persian
acancel	I cancel	English
doːˈʃæg	mattress	Persian
leːt	light	English
orːæd.di	already	English
sændiˈwiːt͡ʃ	sandwich	English
d͡ʒuːˈti	shoe	Persian
seːˈkæl	bicycle	English
kʰaːb	cap	English
burˈwaz	frame	Persian
t͡ʃʌb	shut up	Urdu
moːˈtær	car/motor	English
dæfˈtɛr	notebook	Persian
særˈwaːl	trousers	Persian
ɛsˈtaːð	male teacher	Persian
moˈda	fashion	French
rɛˈgiːmæ	diet	French
bantˤaˈluːn	trousers	French
ruːbiˈd͡ʒːaː	money	Hindi
ʃˤaˈnˤtˤa	bag	Turkish
abˈla	female teacher	Turkish
tɛzː	whatever	Turkish
