= Musawwarat es-Sufra =

Meroitic temple complex in modern Sudan

- المصورات الصفراء (Arabic)
- Musawwarat es-Sufra
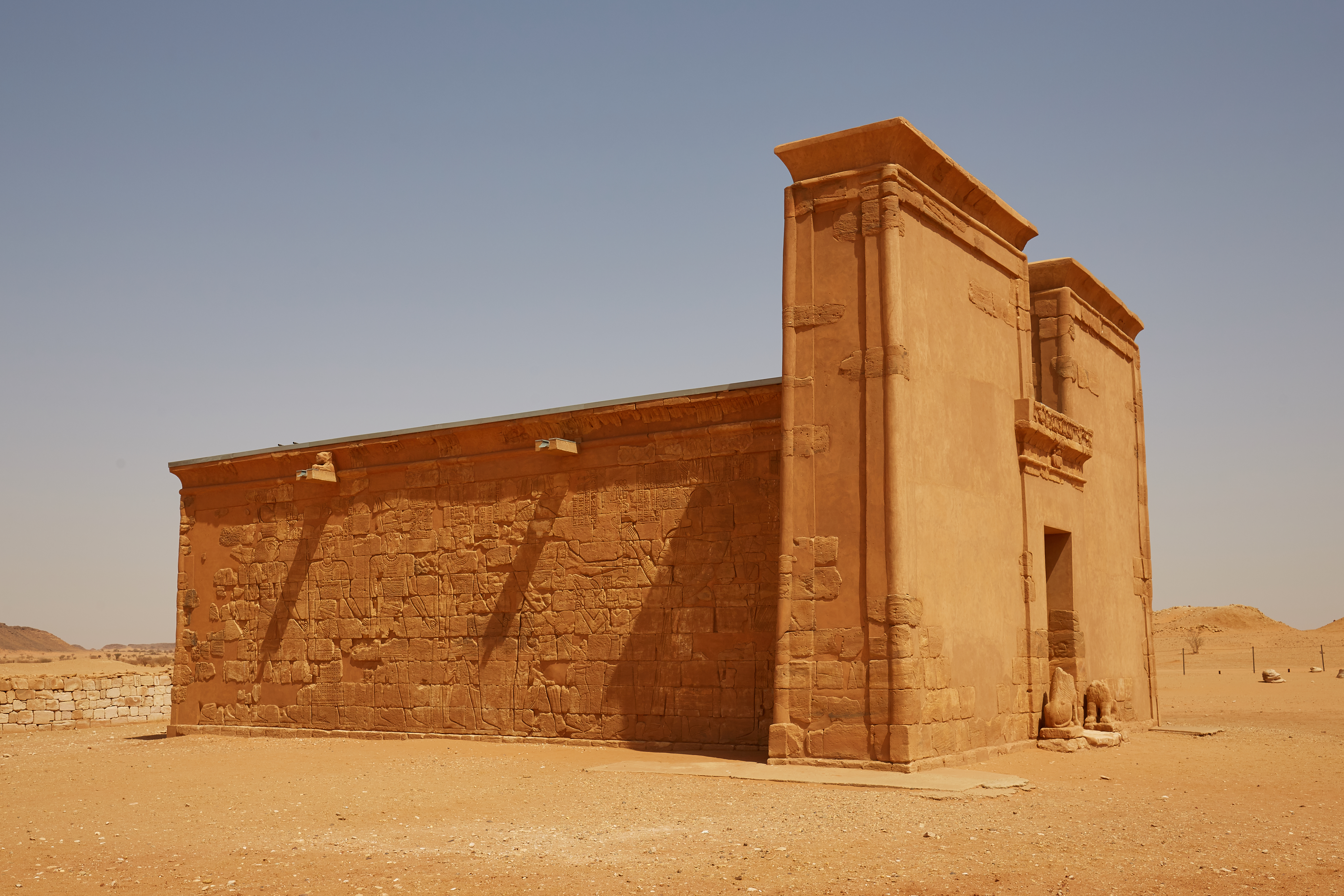
- Apedemak Lion Temple

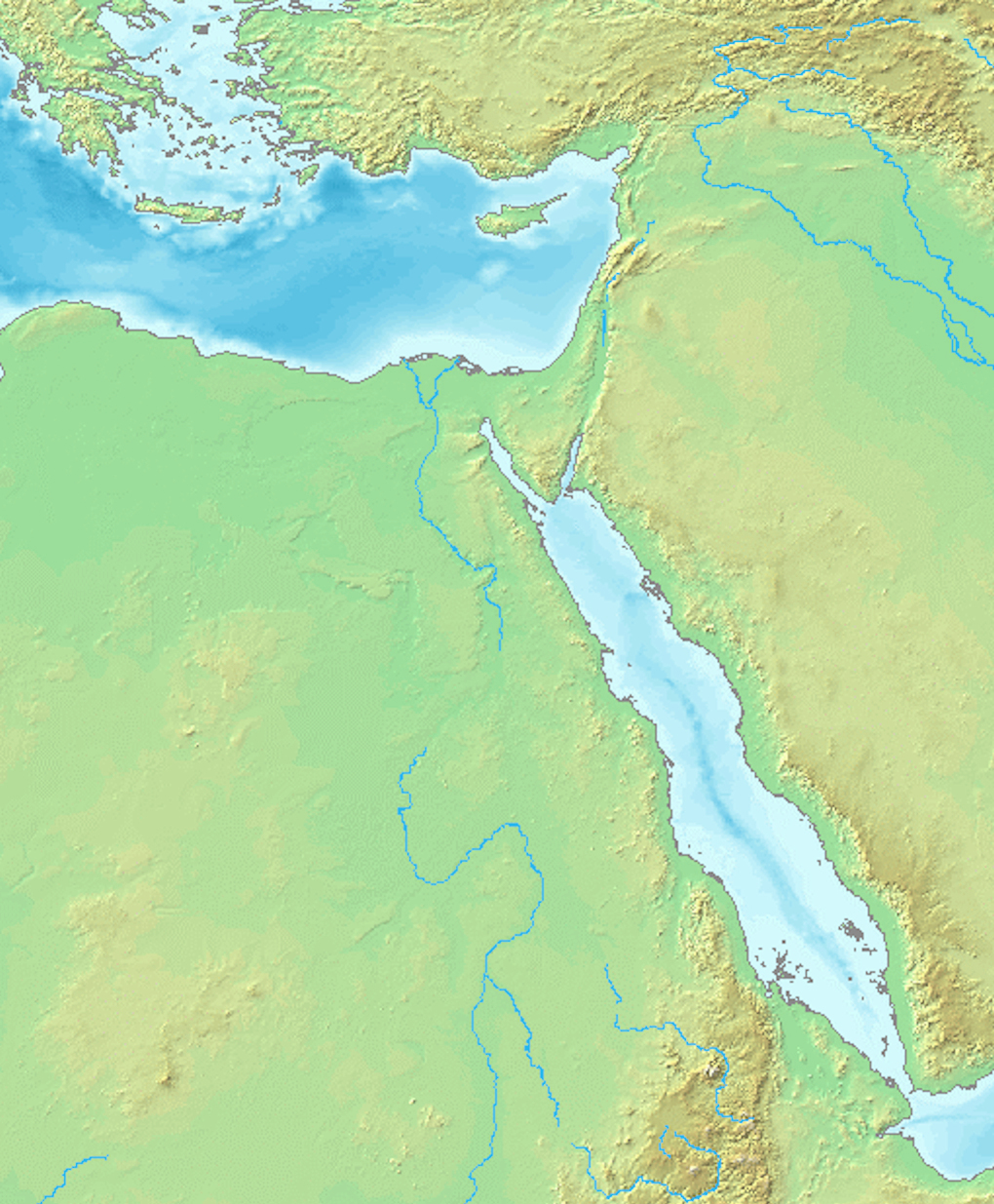
- Location within Northeast Africa Location within Sudan
- 16°24′57″N 33°19′25″E
- Type: Sanctuary
- Location: Musawwarat es-Sufra, River Nile (state), Sudan
- Region: Nubia

UNESCO World Heritage Site
- Official name: Archaeological sites of the Island of Meroe
- Type: Cultural
- Criteria: ii, iii, iv, v
- Designated: 2011 (35th session)
- Reference no.: 1336
- Region: Arab States

Musawwarat es-Sufra (Arabic:المصورات الصفراء al-Musawwarāt as-sufrā, Meroitic: Aborepi, Old Egyptian: jbrp, jpbr-ˁnḫ), also known as Al-Musawarat Al-Sufra, is a large Meroitic temple complex in modern Sudan, dating back to the early Meroitic period of the 3rd century BC. It is located in a large basin surrounded by low sandstone hills in the western Butana, 180 kilometres (110 mi) northeast of Khartoum, 20 kilometres (12 mi) north of Naqa and approximately 25 kilometres (16 mi) south-east of the Nile. With Meroë and Naqa it is known as the Island of Meroe, and was listed as a UNESCO World Heritage Site in 2011. Constructed in sandstone, the main features of the site include the Great Enclosure, the Lion Temple of Apedemak and the Great Reservoir. Most significant is the number of representations of elephants, suggesting that this animal played an important role at Musawwarat es-Sufra.

== Research ==
The site of Musawwarat es-Sufra was originally mentioned by Linant de Bellefonds in 1822, and then shortly thereafter by Frédéric Cailliaud. The first detailed description of the site was made by Carl Richard Lepsius. Archaeological fieldwork was conducted by the Butana expedition of the Humboldt University of Berlin under the direction of archaeologist Fritz Hintze from 1960 until 1970. The team re-erected the Lion Temple, collapsed in antiquity, and constructed a new roof. These investigations continued after a gap of several decades and are ongoing.

== Lion Temple ==
The Lion Temple is a single-chambered rectangular 14.21 metres (46.6 ft) in length, 9.13 metres (30.0 ft) in width and 4.7 metres (15 ft) in height temple with pylon and six columns made of drums. Erected by King Arnekhamani and dedicated to Apedemak the temple bears inscriptions in Egyptian hieroglyphs and representations of elephants and lions on the rear inside wall as well as reliefs of Apedemak depicted as a three-headed god on the outside walls. A 3D model of the Lion Temple can be seen here. An Animation of the Lion Temple 3D model can be viewed here.

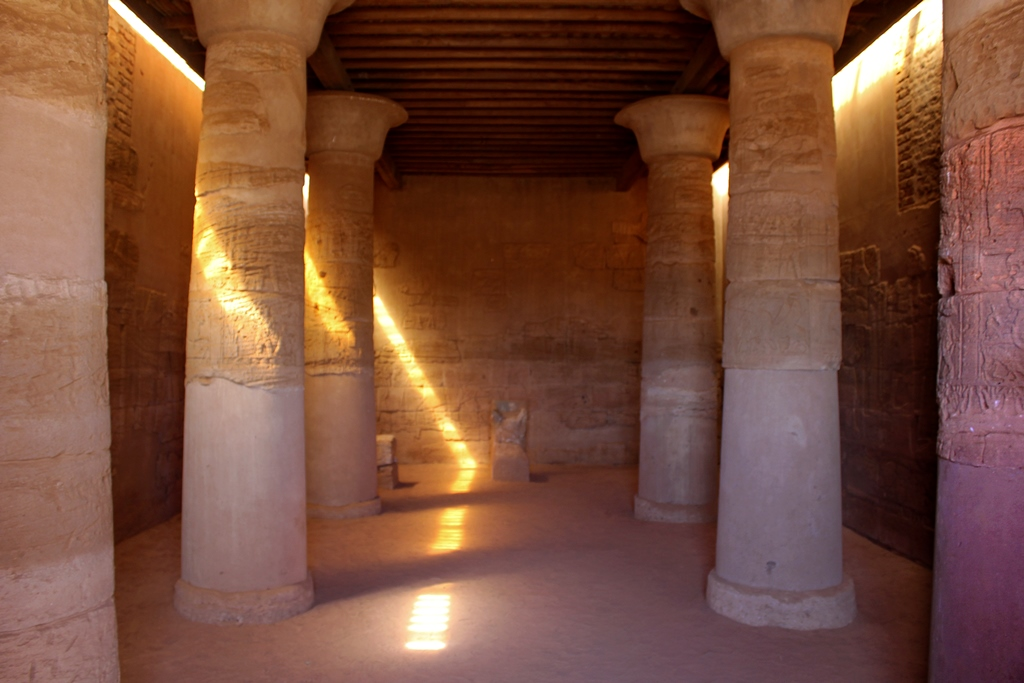
Columns in the Lion Temple

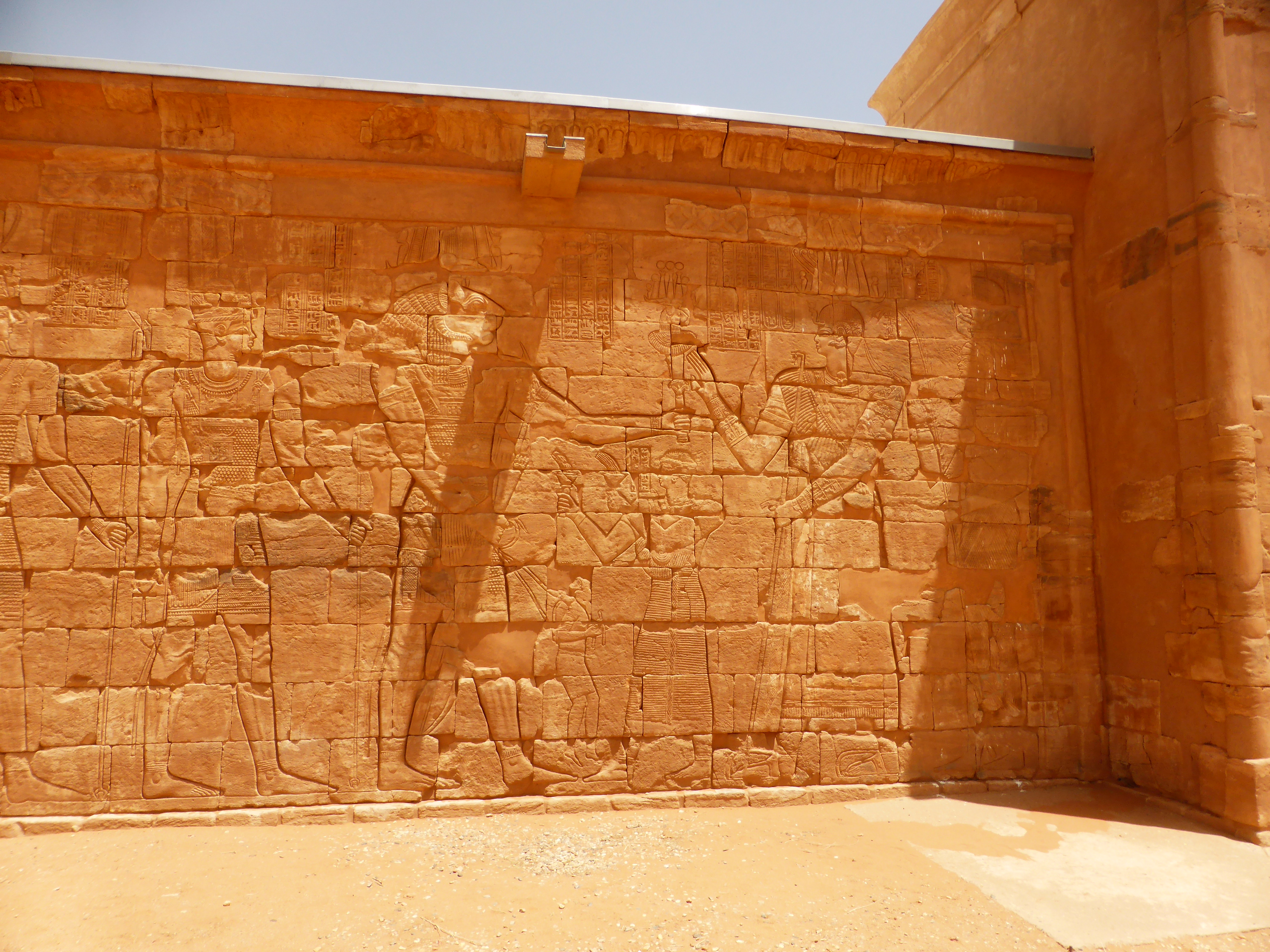
Relief of Apedemak

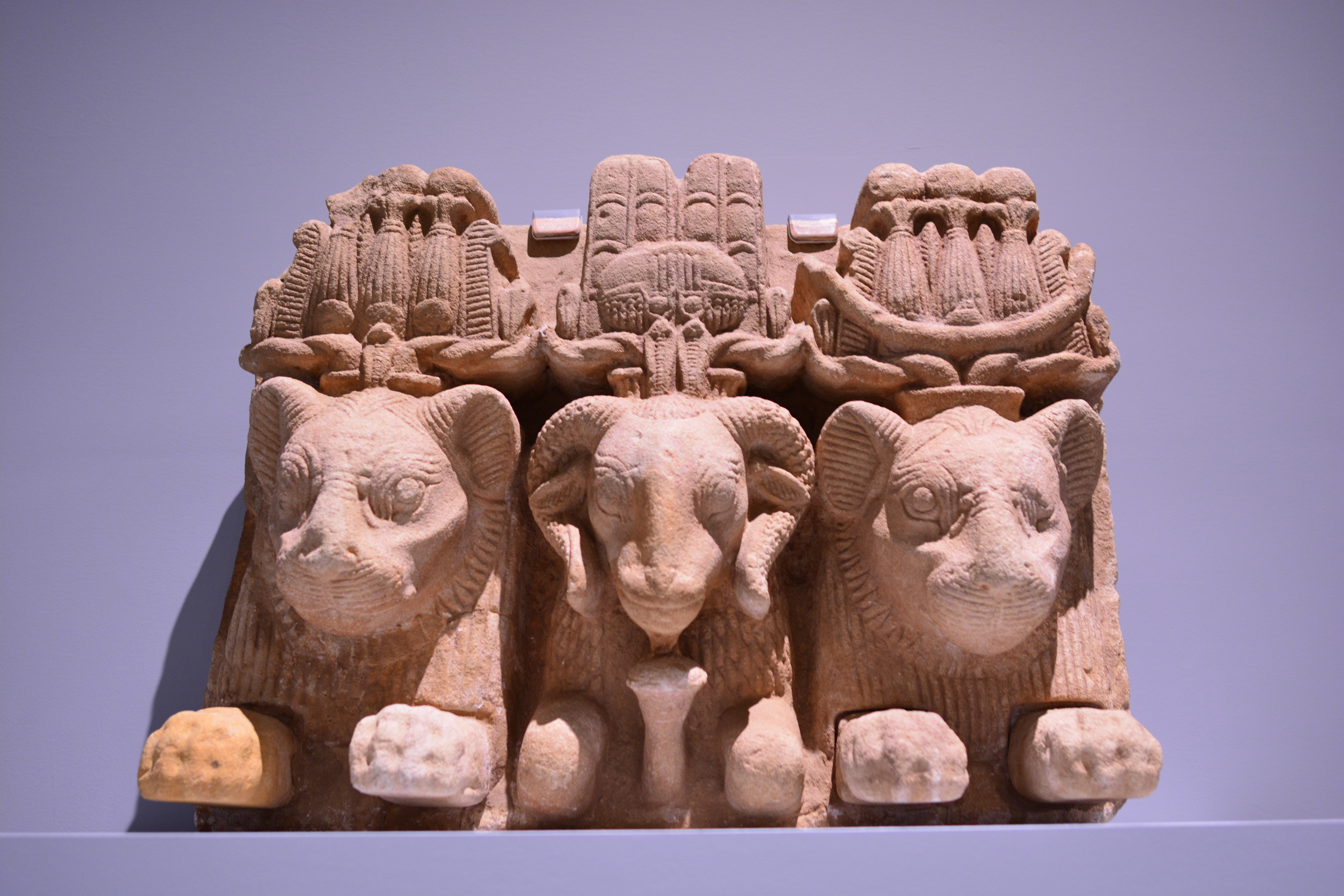
Relief depicting two lion deities and Amun as a ram

== Great Enclosure ==
The Great Enclosure is the main structure of the site. Much of the large labyrinth-like building complex, which covers approximately 45,000 square metres (11 acres), was erected in the third century BC. According to Hintze, "the complicated ground plan of this extensive complex of buildings is without parallel in the entire Nile valley". The maze of courtyards includes three (possible) temples, passages, low walls, preventing any contact with the outside world, about 20 columns, ramps and two reservoirs.

There were many sculptures of animals, such as elephants and most of the walls of the complex bear graffiti and masons’ or pilgrims' marks both pictorial and in Meroitic or Greek script. The scheme of the site is, so far, without parallel in Nubia and ancient Egypt, and there is some debate about the purpose of the buildings, with earlier suggestions including a college, a hospital, and an elephant-training camp. According to the scholar Basil Davidson, at least four Kushite queens — Amanirenas, Amanishakheto, Nawidemak and Amanitore — probably spent part of their lives in Musawwarat es-Sufra.

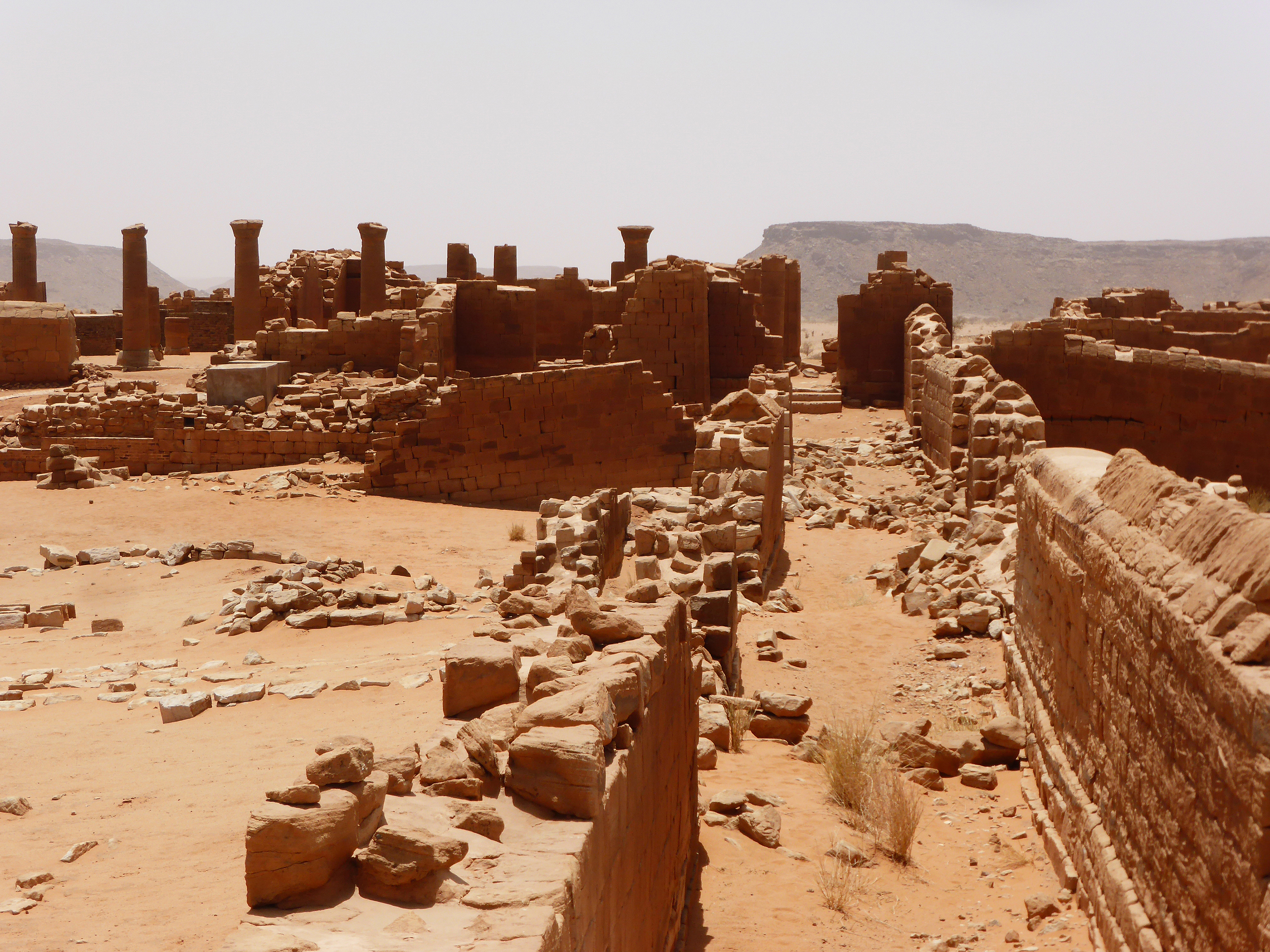
View of the Great Enclosure

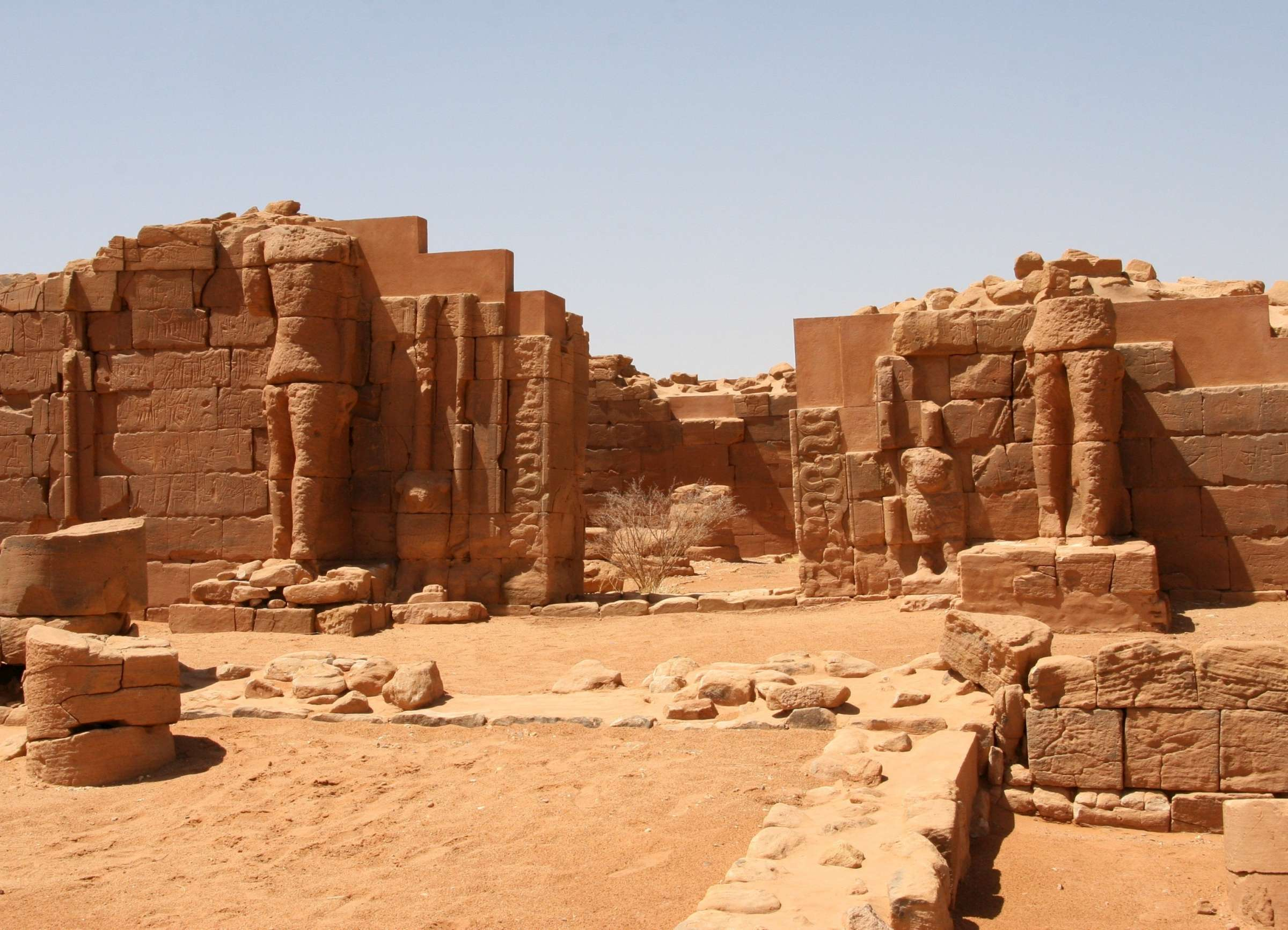
An entrance to the Great Enclosure

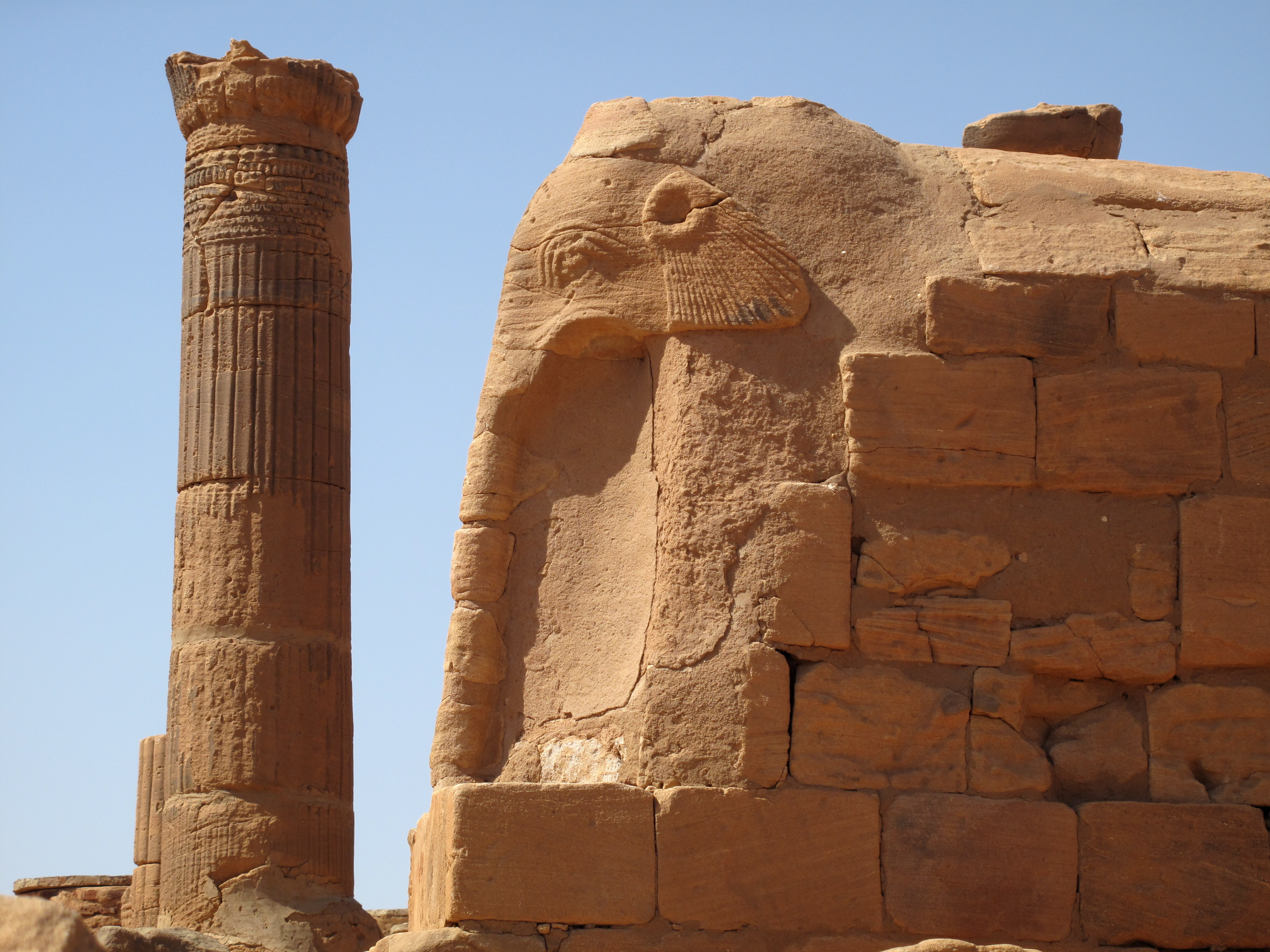
Statue of an elephant

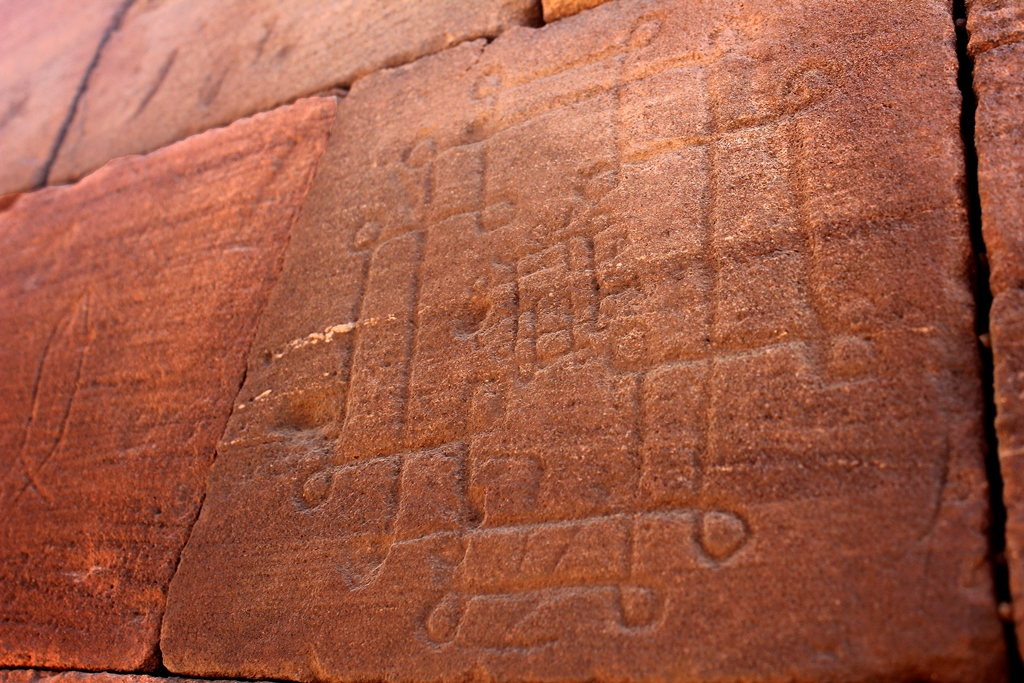
Wall-drawing

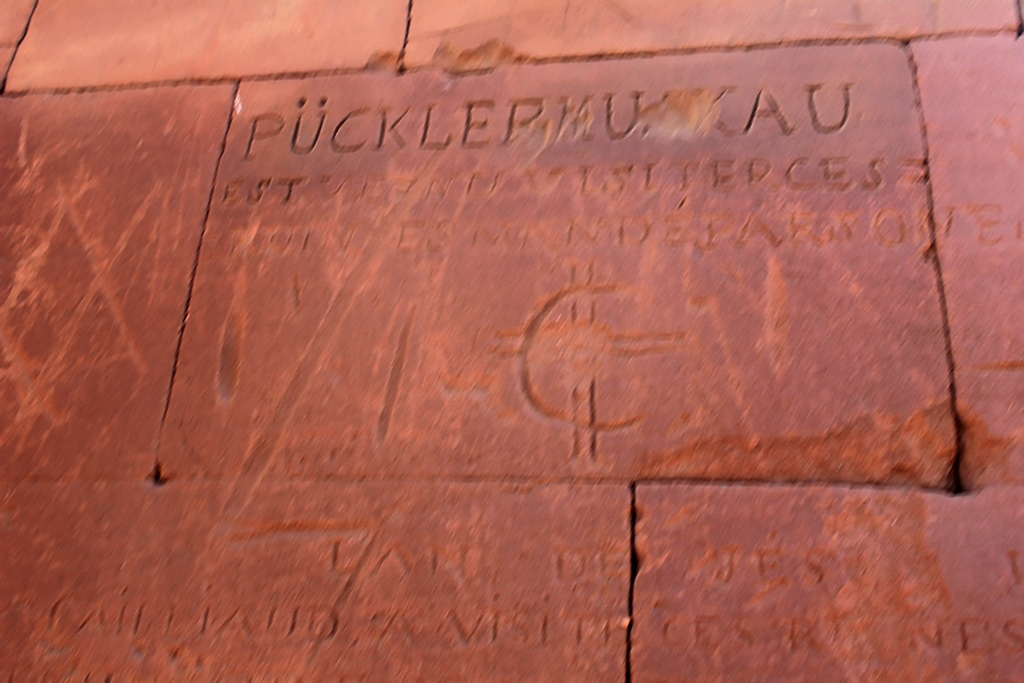
Graffiti of Prince Pückler-Muskau

== Great Reservoir ==
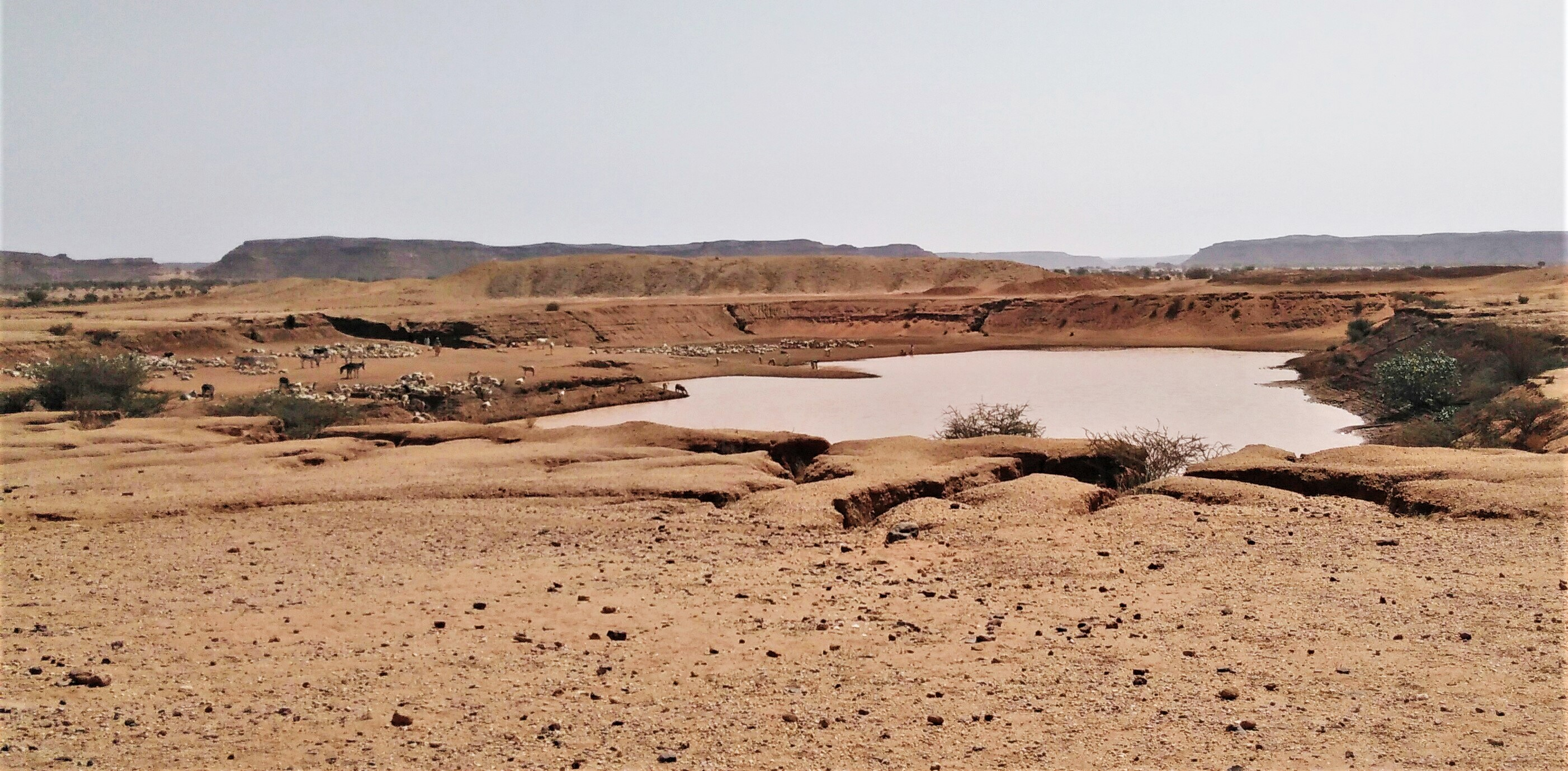
The "Great Hafir" at Musawwarat es-Sufra

The Great Reservoir is a Hafir to retain as much as possible of the rainfall of the short, wet season. It is 250 metres (820 ft) in diameter and excavated 6.3 metres (21 ft) into the ground.

== 3D Models with laser-scanning ==
The Zamani Project document cultural heritage sites in 3D to create a record for future generations. The documentation of the Great Enclosure of Musawwarat es-Sufra and the Apedemak (Lion) Temple is based on terrestrial laser-scanning and was carried out in 2009. 3D models, animations, plans and images of some of the temples are online available at www.zamaniproject.org

== Literature ==
- Basil Davidson Old Africa Rediscovered, Gollancz, 1959.
- Jochen Hallof, Die Baustufen I bis IV der Großen Anlage von Musawwarat es Sufra, 2006.
- Peter Shinnie Meroe, 1967.
- Steffen Wenig (ed.), Die Tempel von Musawwarat es Sufra, 1996.
