= Jordanian Bengali Pidgin Arabic =

Pidgin language of Jordan

- Native to: Jordan
- Language family: Arabic-based pidgin: Jordanian Bengali Pidgin Arabic

Language codes
- ISO 639-3: None (mis)
- Glottolog: jord1239

Jordanian Bengali Pidgin Arabic (JBPA) is an Arabic pidgin spoken in Jordan. The pidgin was formed from contact between the Jordanian Arabic and Bengali languages. UNESCO classifies it as "endangered/unsafe".

== Grammar ==
The past/perfect and the present/imperfect in Jordanian Bengali Pidgin Arabic are not preserved. Imperfect aspect is interchangeably used for the past and the present tense. This lack of inflection for tense can be compensated either by context or by the existence of some adverbs, such as ʕawwal, gabul and badēn. Moreover, the tense/aspect might expressed by the use of the JBPA copula fī.

== Phonology ==
Consonants
		Bilabial	Labial	Interdental	Alveolar	Palatal	Velar	Uvular	Pharyngeal	Glottal
Plosive	Voiceless				t		k			ʔ
Plosive	Voiced	b			d		g			ʔ
Fricative	Voiceless		f	θ	s	ç		χ	ħ	h
Fricative	Voiced			ð	z	ʝ		ʁ	ʕ	
Affricative	Voiceless					cç				
Affricative	Voiced					z				
Nasal		m			n					
Tap					r					
Approximant			w		l	j	ɰ			

JBPA underwent several phoneme shifts from Jordanian Arabic.

- The glottal stop /ʔ/ was, in most of the contexts, realized as a long vowel or was lost
- Jordanian Bengali Pidgin Arabic speakers sometimes replaced the unvoiced labiodental fricative /f/ with the unvoiced stop /p/
- The interdental fricatives /θ/ and /ð/ have been replaced bytheir dental plosive counterparts /t/ and /d/
- The voiced fricative /z/, it sometimes shifts into its voiceless counterpart /s/
- The velar fricatives /ɣ/ and /x/ shifted to /k/ and /g/
- The pharyngeal /ħ/ is pronounced either as a slight /h/ or as a long vowel
- The Palatal Affricate /dʒ/ is substituted with the fricative /z/

== See also ==
- Arabic-based creole languages
