= Hafir =

Reservoir

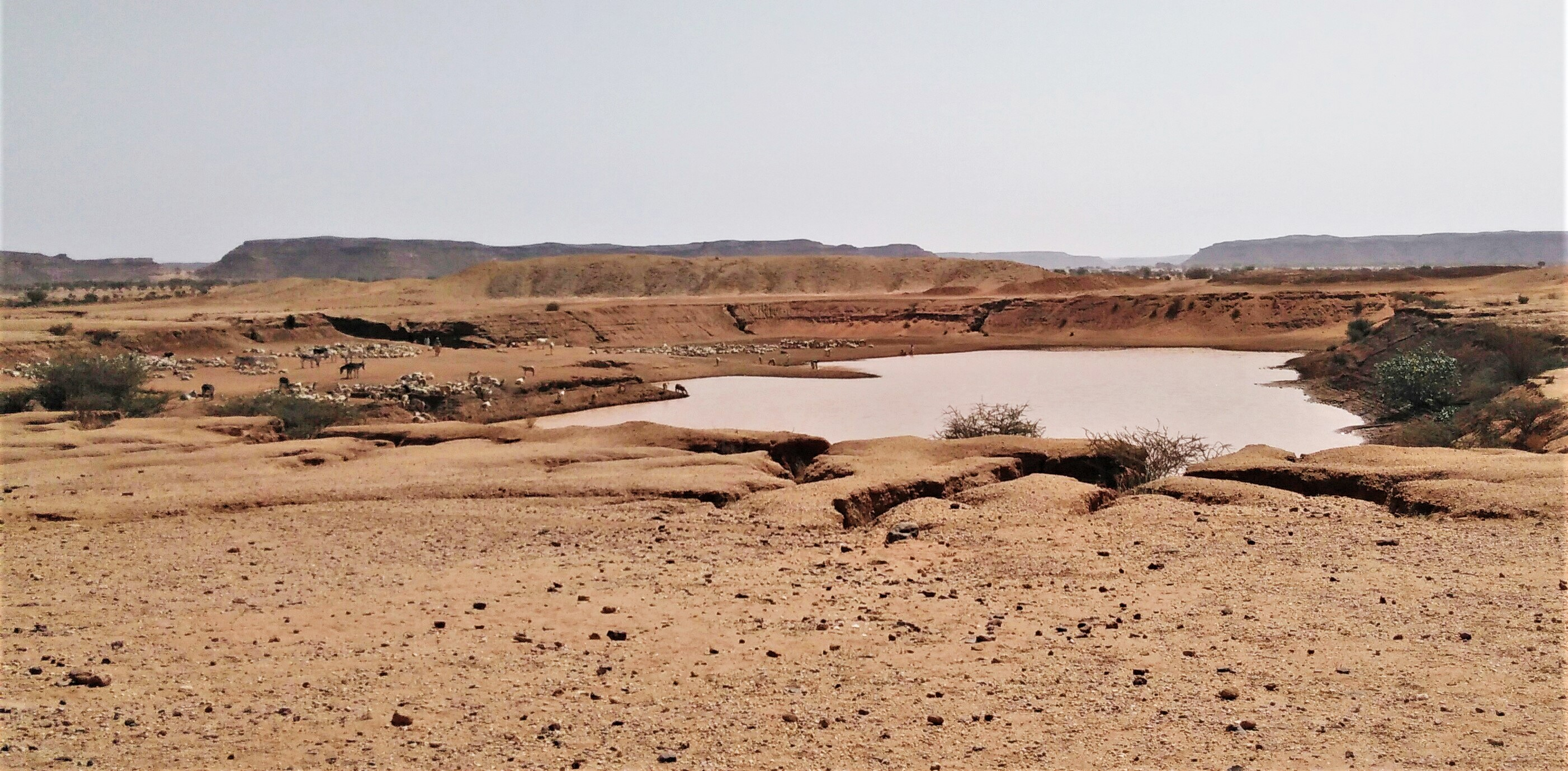
The "Great Hafir" at Musawwarat es-Sufra

A hafir, or haffir, is an artificially constructed water catchment basin with a circular earthen wall and diameters of between 70–250 metres (230–820 ft) and heights of up to 7 metres (23 ft) Adapted to semi-desert conditions, the hafirs catch the water during the rainy season to have it available for several months during the dry season to supply drinking water, irrigate fields and water cattle. It is used in central Sudan from time immemorial.

== History ==
Hafirs were an important feature of the Meroitic civilization in the Butana and were often built in the immediate vicinity of temples, for example the Great Hafir near the Lion Temple in Musawwarat es-Sufra. 800 ancient and modern hafirs have been registered in the Butana. Some scholars assume that the hafirs near temples were a Meroitic policy to control pastoralists’ movements and collect taxes.

== Present-day ==
Hafirs are still constructed and used today in central Sudan and South Sudan. Today's hafirs hold between 10,000–60,000 cubic metres (350,000–2,120,000 ft^{3}) of water mostly administered by village communities and are used for irrigation. Only the hafirs excavated by the government are also accessible to the herds of nomads.
