= Butana =

Region between the Atbara and the Nile in the Sudan

Coordinates: 14°N 35°E

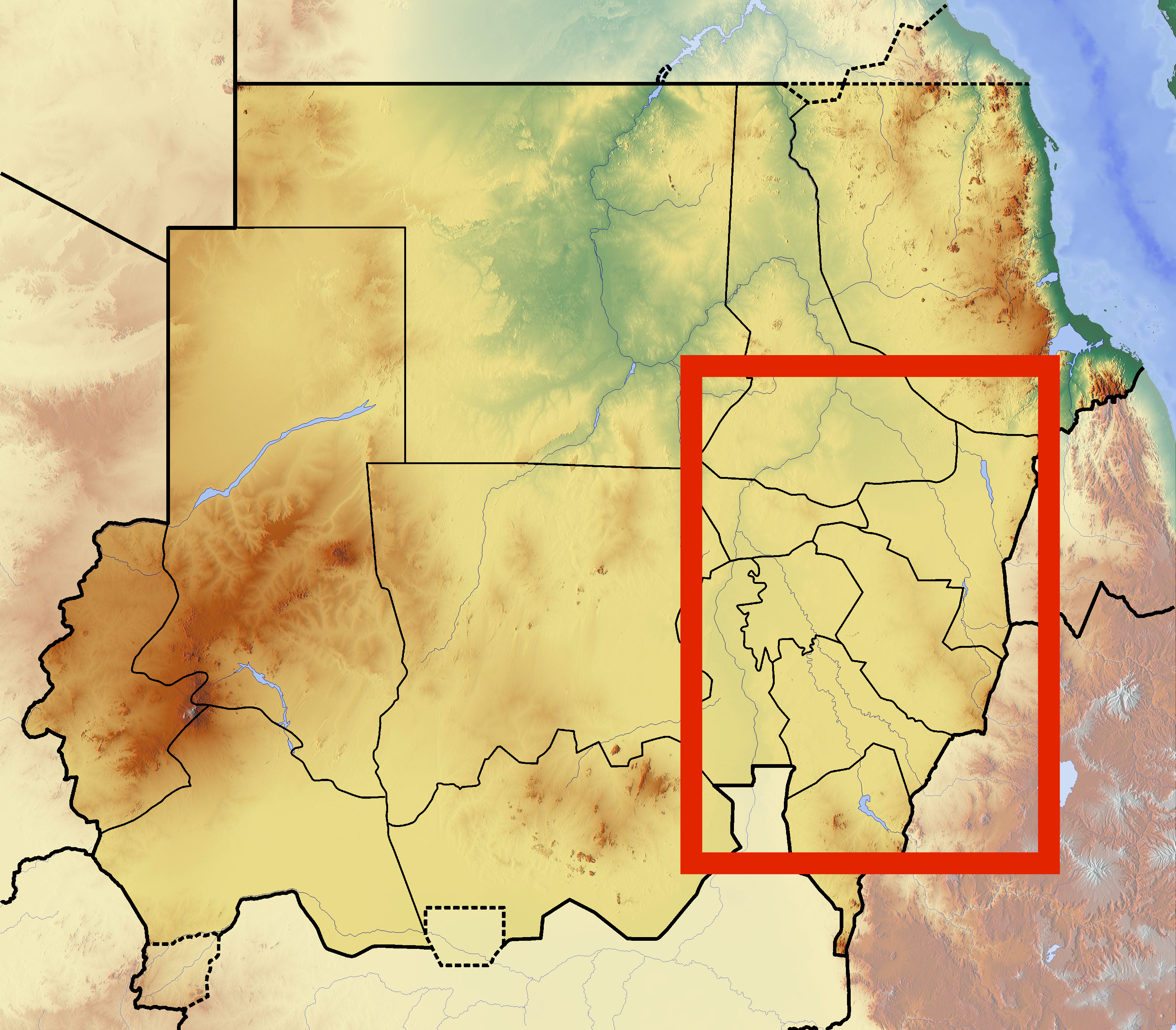
Butana area of Sudan

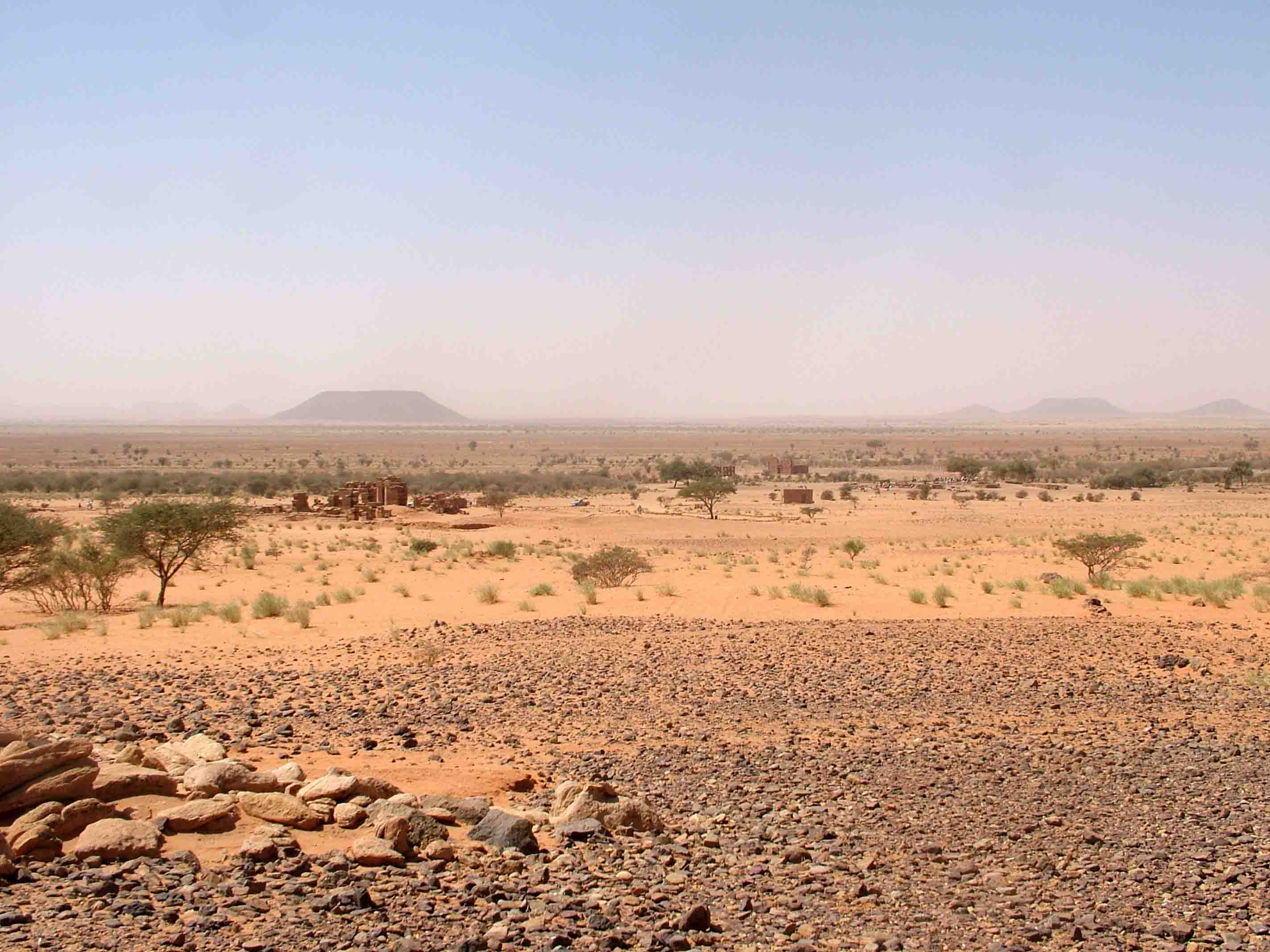
Dry landscape of the northeastern Butana with the ruins of a Kushite temple at Naqa

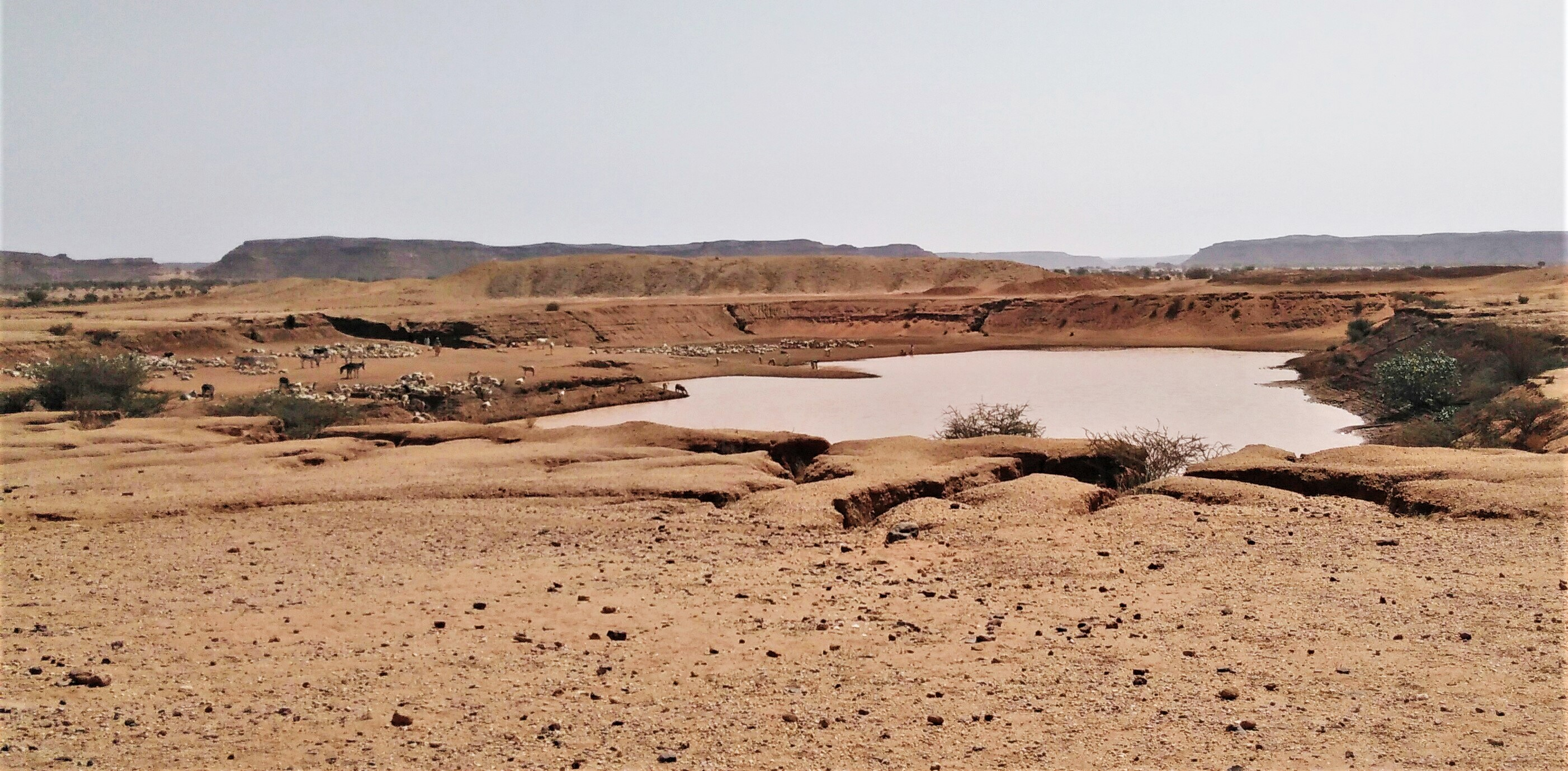
The "Great Hafir" at Musawwarat es-Sufra in west Butana

The Butana (Arabic: البطانة, Buṭāna), historically called the Island of Meroë, is the region between the Atbara and the Nile in Sudan. South of Khartoum it is bordered by the Blue Nile and in the east by Lake Tana in Ethiopia. It should not be confused with the Gezira, the region west of the Blue Nile and east of the White Nile.

Geological characteristics of the Butana are sandy and stony soils, light non-cracking clay, and dark cracking clay; the superficial clays cover over 70% of the plain. Although there are very limited water resources, seasonal surface water wells and a few deep bore wells are present. A tropical continental climate provides rain in the southern section of the plain. Two vegetation zones feature a semi-desert Acacia shrub, short grasslands, and a low woodland savannah.

The region includes most of the state of Al Qadarif plus parts of the states of Kassala, River Nile, Khartoum, Al Jazirah and Sennar. The Butana plain occupies most of Butana. The name Butana is applied to many things which come from the region, such as the Butana breed of cattle, Butana sheep, Butana goats, et cetera. Historically, it was part of Alodia and later the Funj Sultanate of Sinnar.

Butana was known as the "Island of Meroë" when it was part of the Kushitic kingdom of Meroë. The city of Meroë was about halfway between Atbarah and Khartoum, on the east side of the Nile river. There were two other major Meroitic cities in Butana, Musawwarat es-Sufra and Naqa.

Today it is mainly inhabited by the Sudanese Arabs of Sudan, such as the Ja'alin, the Shukria clan, the Batahin, the Lahawiin, the Rufaa people, the Ansar, the Awazim, and other Sudanese Arab tribes. The area is also inhabited by the Rashaida. However, the Southern Butana has been identified as mainly the domain of the powerful Shukria clan and their ruling family of "Abusin." The Shukria have, through power of arms, become overlords of the Butana since the 17th century. In local poetry, the Butana is numerously referred to as "the Butana of Abusin" in reference to the Shukria tribal chief Ahmad Bey ibn 'Awad el Kerim of whom Sir Samuel Baker has left so vivid a portrait. It is also sometimes referred to as "the Butana of Abu Ali" in reference to a distant ancestor of Ahmed Bey Abusin credited for ensuring the triumph of the victorious Shukira in the 17th century.

The hafir is an important source of water.

== See also ==
- Batahin
