= Sudanese Arabic =

Regional variety of the Arabic language

- لهجة سودانية (Lahja Sudaniyah)
- Pronunciation: [ˈlahɟa suːˈdaːnijja]
- Native to: Sudan, South Sudan, Eritrea
- Region: Gezira, Khartoum, River Nile, Northern, Kordofan, White Nile, Sennar, Qadarif, Anseba, Gash-Barka
- Ethnicity: Sudanese Arabs
- Speakers: L1: 41 million (2022–2024); L2: 11 million (2022); Total: 52 million (2022–2024)
- Language family: Afro-Asiatic: Semitic; West Semitic; Central Semitic; Arabic; Sudanese Arabic
- Writing system: Arabic alphabet

Language codes
- ISO 639-3: apd
- Glottolog: suda1236
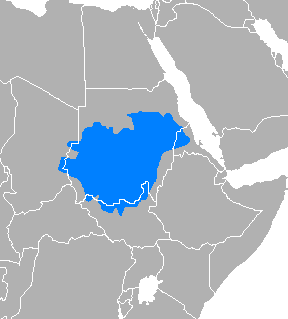

Sudanese Arabic, also referred to as the Sudanese dialect (Arabic: اللهجة السودانية, romanized: Al-Lahja Al-Sūdānīyah, Sudanese Arabic [ˈlahɟa suːˈdaːnijja]), Colloquial Sudanese (Arabic: العامية السودانية [ˈʕaːmmijja suːˈdaːnijja]) or locally as Common Sudanese (Arabic: دارجى [ˈdaːriɟi]) refers to the various related varieties of Arabic spoken in Sudan as well as parts of Egypt, Eritrea and Ethiopia. Sudanese Arabic has also influenced a number of Arabic-based pidgins and creoles, including Juba Arabic, widely used in South Sudan.

Sudanese Arabic is highly diverse. Famed Sudanese linguist Awn ash-Sharif Gasim noted that "it is difficult to speak of a 'Sudanese colloquial language' in general, simply because there is not a single dialect used simultaneously in all the regions where Arabic is the mother tongue. Every region, and almost every tribe, has its own brand of Arabic." However, Gasim broadly distinguishes between the varieties spoken by sedentary groups along the Nile (such as the Ja'aliyyin) and pastoralist groups (such as the Baggara groups of west Sudan). The most widely-spoken variety of Sudanese is variably referred to as Central Sudanese Arabic, Central Urban Sudanese Arabic, or Khartoum Arabic, which more closely resembles varieties spoken by sedentary groups. Some, like researcher Stefano Manfredi, refer to this variety as "Sudanese Standard Arabic" due to the variety's comparative prestige and widespread use. Linguist Ibrahim Adam Ishaq identifies two varieties of Arabic spoken in Darfur besides Sudanese Standard Arabic, including Pastoral Arabic and what is generally termed Darfur Arabic, which refers to the Arabic primarily spoken by multilingual Darfuris living in rural parts of the region. A number of especially distinct tribal varieties, such as the Arabic spoken by the Shaigiya and Shukriyya tribes, have also elicited special interest from linguists.

The variety evolved from the varieties of Arabic brought by Arabs who migrated to the region after the signing of the Treaty of Baqt, a 7th-century treaty between the Muslim rulers of Egypt and the Nubian kingdom of Makuria. Testimonies by travelers to the areas that would become modern-day Sudan, like Ibn Battuta, indicate that Arabic coexisted alongside indigenous Sudanese languages, with multilingualism in Arabic and non-Arabic Sudanese languages being well attested by travelers to the region up until the 19th century. Sudanese Arabic has characteristics similar to Egyptian Arabic. As a point of difference, though, the Sudanese dialect retains some archaic pronunciation patterns, such as the letter ج, which is pronounced as a voiced palatal stop. Accordingly, linguists have identified a variety of influences from Nubian, Beja, Fur, Nilotic, and other Sudanese languages on the vocabulary and phonology of Sudanese Arabic.

By the 16th and 17th centuries, the Sultanates of Darfur and Sennar emerged and adopted Arabic as an official language, employing the language in public documents and as an intermediary language between the myriad of languages spoken at the time. Under the Sultanate of Sennar, Arabic was also employed in the writing of historical and theological books, most famously The Tabaqat of the Walis, the Righteous, the 'Ulema and the Poets in the Sudan (Arabic: كتاب الطبقات في خصوص الاولياء والصالحين والعلماء والشعراء في السودان) by Muhammad wad Dayf Allah. While the written Arabic used in these Sultanates more closely resembles the norms of Classical Arabic, Dayf Allah's book features early attestations of some elements of modern Sudanese Arabic phonology and syntax.

Like other varieties of Arabic outside of Modern Standard Arabic, Sudanese Arabic is typically not used in formal writing or on Sudanese news channels. However, Sudanese Arabic is employed extensively on social media and various genres of Sudanese poetry (such as dobeyt and halamanteesh), as well as in Sudanese cinema and television.

== History ==
In 1889 the Journal of the Royal Anthropological Institute of Great Britain claimed that the Arabic spoken in Sudan was "a pure but archaic Arabic". This is related to Sudanese Arabic's realization of the Modern Standard Arabic voiceless uvular plosive [q] as the voiced velar stop [g], as is done in Sa'idi Arabic and other varieties of Sudanic Arabic, as well as Sudanese Arabic's realization of the Modern Standard Arabic voiced alveopalatal fricative [dʒ] as the voiced palatal stop [ɟ]. However, Sudanese Arabic also retains the plethora of innovations on Classical Arabic found in other Egypto-Sudanic varieties, such as the loss of interdental fricatives.

== Phonology ==
=== Consonants ===
Consonants of Central Urban Sudanese Arabic
		Labial	Alveolar		Palatal	Velar	Pharyngeal	Glottal
		Labial	plain	emphatic	Palatal	Velar	Pharyngeal	Glottal
Nasal		m	n		(ɲ)	(ŋ)		
Stop	voiceless	(p)	t	tˤ	(c)	k		ʔ
Stop	voiced	b	d	dˤ	ɟ	ɡ		
Fricative	voiceless	f	s	sˤ	ʃ	x	ħ	h
Fricative	voiced		z	zˤ		ɣ	ʕ	
Flap/trill			r	(rˤ)				
Approximant			l	(lˤ)	j	w		

As with other Egypto-Sudanic varieties, Modern Standard Arabic interdental fricatives /θ/, /ð/, and /ðˤ/ are substituted by either their fricative or stop counterparts. As is the case in Egyptian Arabic and Levantine Arabic, interdental fricatives are realized as /t/, /d/, and /dˤ/ in inherited words, and as /s/, /z/, and /zˤ/ in loans from Modern Standard Arabic. Similar to Sa'idi Arabic, the voiced velar stop /g/ corresponds to the Modern Standard Arabic voiced uvular plosive /q/ in Sudanese. Gasim also attests to the realization of Modern Standard Arabic [q] as [ɣ] in Sudanese.

Varieties of Sudanese Arabic spoken by non-Arab groups, such as Darfur Arabic, substitute pharyngeal or emphatic consonants with non-pharyngeal counterparts, i.e., /s/ for Modern Standard Arabic /sˤ/. The consonants /ɲ/, /c/, and /ŋ/ also have a marginal presence in Darfur Arabic and other varieties of Sudanese Arabic in loanwords from indigenous Sudanese languages. Some examples include:

- Darfur Arabic /ŋaŋa/ for "baby"
- Darfur Arabic /naŋnaŋ/ for "talkative"
- Sudanese Arabic /ʕaŋgareːb/ for "bed"
- Central Sudanese Arabic /ɲarr/ for "mew"
- Central Sudanese Arabic /kac.can/ for "to be disgusted with"

The Arabic letter ǧīm ج maintains an archaic pronunciation [ɟ] in Sudanese (other dialects typically have [dʒ], [ʒ] or [j]), while Cairene Arabic has [g].

=== Vowels ===
	Front		Back	
	short	long	short	long
Close	i	iː	u	uː
Mid		eː		oː
Open	a	aː		

The long mid vowels /eː/ and /oː/ are equivalent respectively to the diphthongs [aj] and [aw] found in Modern Standard Arabic.

== Influence from indigenous Sudanese languages ==
Multilingualism in Arabic and indigenous Sudanese languages has been the norm in Sudan since the entry of Arabic into the region, resulting in noticeable influences from Nubian, Beja, western Sudanese, and Nilotic languages on the vocabulary of Sudanese Arabic.

=== Nubian languages ===
Prior to the widespread adoption of Arabic, the Nubian languages were dominant in medieval Sudan, and have thus made a noticeable impact on the lexicon of Sudanese Arabic, particularly on vocabulary relating to agriculture and Nubian foods and traditions. Many of the Nubian influences on Sudanese Arabic hail from the Nobiin language, such as the word for cat, /kadiːsa/, as well as the Nobiin accusative suffix -ga/ka which appears in many loanwords of Nubian origin. There is also influence of Nubian in Sudanese Arabic from the Dongolawi language, in particular terms relating to device and water wheel in the form of loanwords like "Kolay". Other words of Nubian origin identified by researchers include:

- /kudeːk/ "excavation in river bank beneath water-wheel"
- /toːreːg/ "horizontal driving spindle [of a water-wheel]"
- /is.sikaːk/ "beam supporting toreig"
- /gureːr/ "newly formed alluvial soil"
- /iŋgaːja/ "special agricultural plot"
- /waːsuːg/ "a special broad wooden shovel pulled by ropes"
- /koːreːg/ "shovel"
- /weːka/ "okra"
- /maːreːg/ "dura"
- /aːbreː/ "cooked sheets of fermented dura dough"
- /ɟalag/ "an animal similar to the wolf"
- /ʕabalaːnɟ/ "monkey"
- /ʕanbaloːg/ "a young she-goat"
- /ɟirtig/ "a ceremonial occasion on the third night of wedding"
- /suːmaːr/ "public praising of bridegroom's uncles"
- /kabareːt/ "special method of perfuming"

=== The Beja language ===
The Beja language, also known as Bidawiyet, is one of Sudan's most spoken indigenous languages, and also contributes significantly to the Sudanese Arabic lexicon. Loanwords from Bidawiyet include:

- /ʕaŋgareːb/ "bed"
- /karkab/ "wooden slippers"
- /funduk/ "wooden mortar"
- /daːna/ "pumpkin container"
- /suksuk/ "beads"
- /doːf/ "boneless meat"
- /gangar/ "corn ears"
- /marfaʕiːn/ "wolf"
- /baʕʃuːm/ "fox"

== Regional variation ==
Because of the varying influence of local languages in different parts of Sudan, there is considerable regional variation in Arabic spoken throughout the country. Thus, the term 'Sudanese Arabic' typically refers to Arabic spoken in northern and central parts of Sudan. The other most commonly mentioned derivative of Sudanese Arabic is Juba Arabic, a pidgin of Arabic spoken in South Sudan, which is much more heavily influenced by other local languages.

== Greetings in Sudanese Arabic ==
In northern Sudan, greetings are typically extended, and involve multiple questions about the other person's health, their family etc. When greeting an informal acquaintance, it is common to begin with the word o, followed by the person's first name: Ō, Khalafalla or Ō, kēf ya Khalafalla.

Formal greetings often begin with the universal As-salām ˤalaykom and the reply, Wa ˤalaykom as-salām, an exchange common to Muslims everywhere. However, other greetings typical to Sudan include Izzēyak (to men) or Izzēyik (to women). A rather informal way to say "How are you", is Inta shadīd? Inti shadīda? "Are you well? (to a male and a female, respectively)", the response to which is usually al-Hamdo lillāh "Praise God" assuming you are indeed feeling well, ma batal "not bad" or nosnos "half-half", if feeling only okay or taˤban showayya "a little tired" if not so well. Of course, there can be many other responses but these are used in everyday language.

Other everyday greetings include kwayyis(a), alhamdulilah "Good, thanks to Allah", Kēf al-usra? "how is the family?" or kēf al awlād? "how are the children". For friends, the question Kēf? can also be formed using the person's first name, prefixed by ya, for example; kēf ya Yōsif? "How are you, Joseph?". Another standard response in addition to al-hamdu lillāh is Allāh ybarik fik "God's blessing upon you". Additional greetings are appropriate for particular times and are standard in most varieties of Arabic, such as Sabāh al-khēr? / Sabāh an-Nōr.

Sudanese that know each other well will often use many of these greetings together, sometimes repeating themselves. It is also common to shake hands on first meeting, sometimes simultaneously slapping or tapping each other on the left shoulder before the handshake (particularly for good friends). Handshakes in Sudan can often last as long as greetings. A handshake between well-acquainted Sudanese will often be preceded by raising one's right hand and touching each other's left shoulder simultaneously before engaging in the handshake, all while exchanging verbal greetings.

== Assenting - saying yes ==
The Sudanese Arabic word for "yes" varies; aye is widely used, although aywa or na‘am are also commonly used.

== See also ==
- Varieties of Arabic
- Chadian Arabic
- Nubi language
- Juba Arabic
