= Shukria clan =

Arab clan living in eastern Sudan

The Shukria are a large Arab clan living in eastern Sudan. They may previously have lived around Merowe but in recent centuries have settled in the Butana region between the Atbara River and the Blue Nile. Towns where the Shukria live include Halfa Aljadeeda, Kassala, Alfao, Khashm el Girba, and Tamboul. The Shukria are Sunni Muslims. They speak an Arabic dialect called Shukriyya.

== Ancestry ==
They claim descent from the Quraysh tribe, and their ancestor is Abdullah Aljawad bin Jaafar Altayar. There is some indication that they are linked with the Arabian tribe of Yashkur, a branch of Qays ʿAylān. All of the Shukria claim descent from a figure from the early seventeenth century called Tuaym, or his son Sha’a el Din walad Tuaym. The family name of the principal branch of the clan is Abu Sin, named after Awad el Kerim “Abu Sin” (Father of the Teeth), from his prominent large teeth. Gedaref city, in the centre of Shukria country, was formerly known as Suk Abu Sin.

The main branches of the Shukriya are the Nailab (including the Abu Sin, descended from Nail, son of Sha'a el Din); the Nurab (descended from Nur, brother of Sha'a el Din); the Galahib (descended from Gilhayb, said to be Sha'a el Din's great-grandfather); the Kadurab, Adlanab, Hasanab, (all descended from Awad el Kerim but separate from the Abu Sin); and various clans not descended from Sha'a el Din - the Aishab, Shadarna, Mihaydat, Ritamat, Ofasa, Nizawin and Noaima.

== Early expansion ==
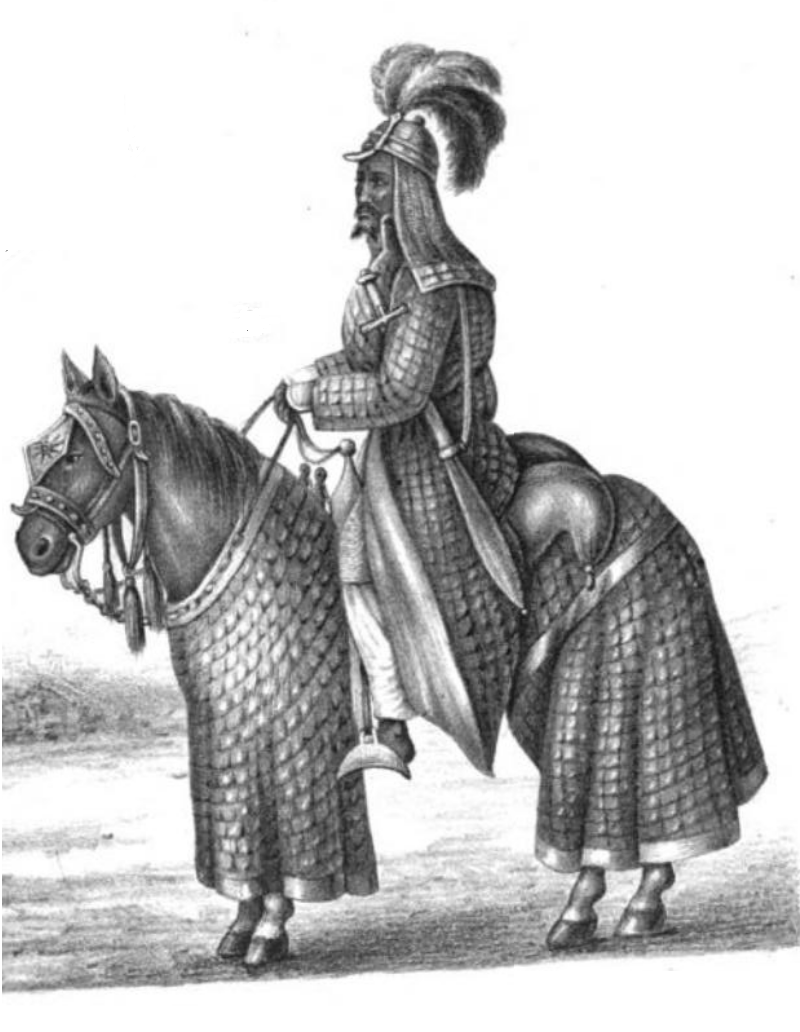
A Shukuri horseman in 1879

The Shukria had a blood feud with the Rikabia and Batahin tribes. In around 1779 the Rikabia suggested to Badi wad Rajab, regent of Sennar, that the Shukria should be made to pay tribute and offered to assist him in bringing them under his authority. Badi sent a Hamaj army with Rikabia reinforcements against the Shukria. According to their accounts, the Shukria only had twelve horses, and only seven of them armored, but still managed to defeat the Hamaj force, capturing over two hundred war horses and their riders’ equipment. The men of the Rikabia tribe were all killed, and the women taken as wives by the Shukria. When Badi wad Rajab heard of this he was furious, but Sultan Adlan promised the Shukria royal pardon if they would come and swear fealty to him. The Shukria chiefs, led by Sheikh Abu Ali, came on his promise and were given gifts as a sign of royal favor. Badi then invited them to Abu Haraz, where they were treacherously murdered by members of the Abu el Kaylik family whose relatives had fallen in the battle. Sheikh Abu Ali and many of his sons were killed; Abu Sin was his surviving son. In 1784 Abu Sin allied with the Abdallabis to take Arbaji. In 1795, a battle took place between the Shukria under Abu Sin and the Batahin at Shambat. The Batahin were nearly wiped out, but Abu Sin was murdered after the battle by a Batahi prisoner.

These battles assured the Shukria an important role in the political structures of the Sennar sultanate. They made marriage alliances with the Funj rulers and were given a large area of the Buttana to settle. Abu Sin encouraged his people to settle widely with grants of land, and increasing use of the camel promoted trade between settlements.

After the Egyptian conquest of Sudan (1820–1824) the Shukria, under Abu Sin's son Ahmad Bey ibn Awad became one of the government's most trusted allies. He was given the title Bey and controlled the Gezira and lands to the East. The Shukria were rewarded with extensive land grants and taxation privileges.

== The Mahdiya ==
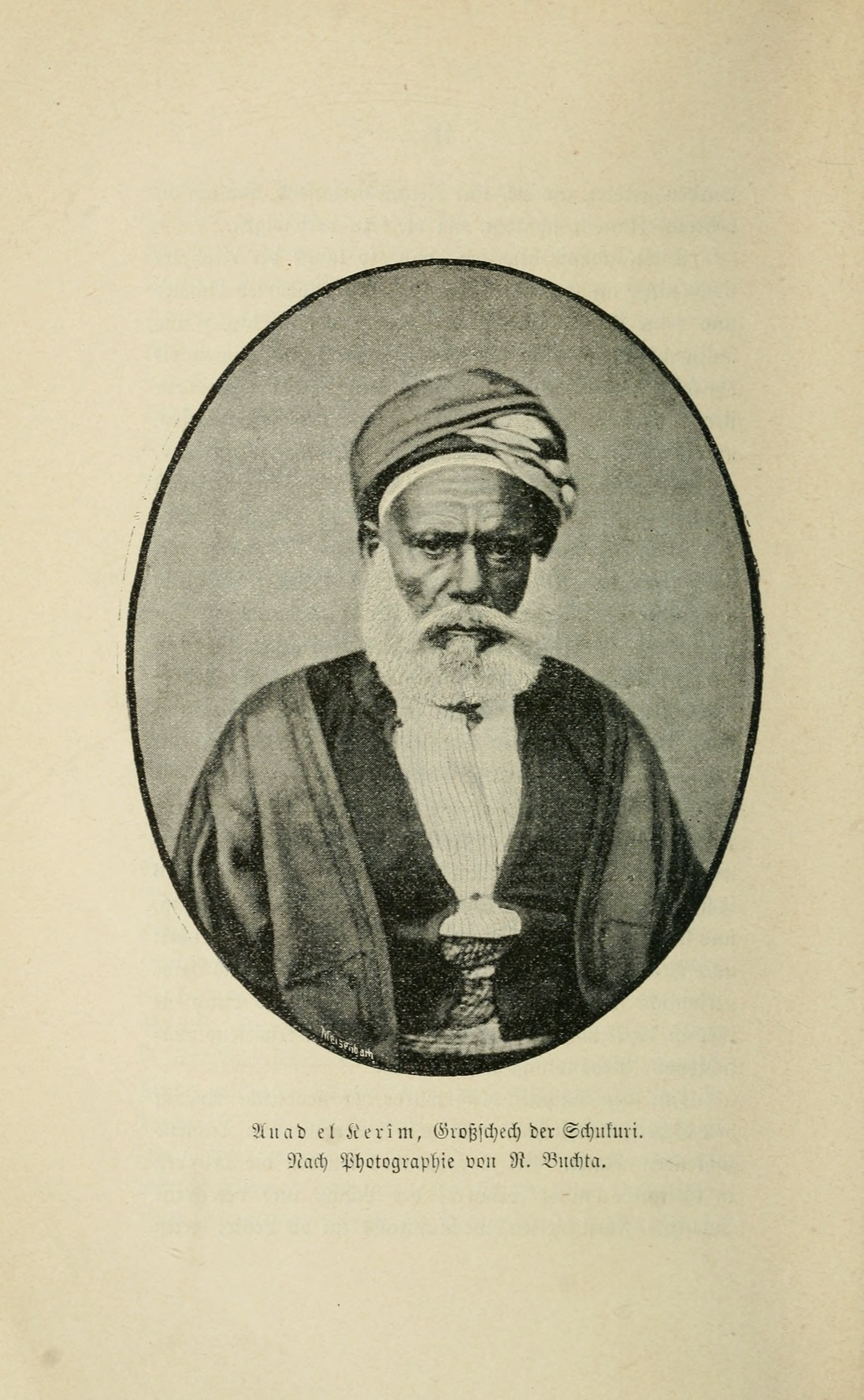
Awad al-Karim Pasha Ahmad abu Sin (died 1886), notable of the Shukriya Arabs; appointed nazir (head of a tribe) of the Shukriya in 1872 and 1882 and governor of Khartoum in 1884

During the Mahdist War the Shukria remained loyal to the Egyptians. Following the defeat of an Egyptian force by the Mahdi at Musallamia on 3 May 1882, Carl Christian Giegler Pasha assembled 2,500 Shukria fighters loyal to the Egyptians and led them into battle against the Mahdist commander Sheikh Taha and defeated him at Abu Haraz on 5 May. As the Mahdist state consolidated, the nazir (chief) of the Shukriya, Awad al-Karim Pasha Ahmad abu Sin, was sent to prison, where he died in 1886.

The great outbreak of rinderpest affected eastern Sudan from 1889, and together with the harsh taxation and demands from the Mahdist Emir of Kassala, Hamed Wad Ali, this led to famine. The Shukria tribe was greatly reduced by starvation, and the areas around Kassala it had once cultivated returned to desert. Some of the Shukriya were displaced towards the south and the eastern borders of Sudan, while new people moved into the Butana. A number of West Africans settled around Gedarif.

== After 1900 ==
During the period of Anglo-Egyptian rule the Shukria regained much of their land and social standing in the Butana. Various agreements were reached with other tribes about water and grazing rights and new water basins were dug. Most importantly, until after World War II only the Shukriya were allowed to dig new wells. The nomadic life has gradually declined since World War II. Today the Shukriya live primarily in rural villages and settlements situated along small waterways. These villages are of two different types: large villages, and the more common style of villages strung out along the Nile River in a continuous chain of closely adjacent huts. A number of them were settled in the development town of New Halfa in the 1960s and 1970s.
