= Batahin =

Arab tribe in Sudan

- Ethnicity: Sudanese Arabs
- Location: Butana
- Religion: Sunni Islam

The Batahin (Arabic: البطاحين) are an Arab tribe in Butana, a region in Sudan. The Batahin are a tribe within the larger Ja'alin tribe confederation. The Batahin are Arabic-speaking
