= Bongor Arabic =

Arabic-based creole language spoken in Chad

- Native to: Chad
- Language family: Arabic-based creole: Turku Arabic; Bongor Arabic
- Early forms: Bimbashi Arabic: Turku Arabic

Language codes
- ISO 639-3: None (mis)
- Glottolog: bong1302

Bongor Arabic is an Arabic-based creole language that serves as a lingua franca in and around the town of Bongor, Chad. It is a direct descendant of Turku Arabic, a former lingua franca of Chad.

== Main changes ==
These are some of the main distinctive features of Bongor Arabic:

- long vowels are replaced by short stressed vowels.
- /x/ tends to be replaced by /k/.
- /f/ tends to be replaced by /p/.
- /ʕ/ is lost.
- no gender distinction.
- no definite article (al-/il-).
- no personal affixes on verbs.
- the root system typical to Arabic and other Semitic languages is no longer productive.

== Vocabulary ==
Bongor	Origin	English
žurnalíst	From French journaliste	journalist
zúska	From French jusqu'à	when; during
kalám	From Arabic كلام kalām	speech; to speak
wotír	From French voiture	car
úsum	From Arabic اسم ism	name
wáy	From Arabic واحد wāħid	one
