= Bimbashi Arabic =

Arabic-based pidgin of Anglo-Egyptian Sudan

- Mongallese
- Region: Anglo-Egyptian Sudan
- Era: 1870–1920
- Language family: Arabic-based pidgin

Language codes
- ISO 639-3: None (mis)
- Glottolog: earl1245

Bimbashi Arabic ("soldier Arabic", or Mongallese) was a pidgin of Arabic which developed among military troops in Anglo-Egyptian Sudan, and was popular from 1870 to 1920. Bimbashi later branched and developed into three languages: Turku (and its modern descendant Bongor Arabic) in Chad, Ki-Nubi in Kenya and Uganda, and Juba Arabic in South Sudan.

== See also ==
- Binbashi
- Varieties of Arabic
- Nubi language
