= Gulf Pidgin Arabic =

Arabic-based creole languages

Gulf Pidgin Arabic is a group of Arabic-based pidgins which are primarily used by migrant workers in the Arab states of the Persian Gulf. The variety was first described on in 1990, with the author reporting that the variety existed as early as the 1960s. As with other pidgins, Gulf Pidgin Arabic does not have a standard form and varies in features and vocabulary between communities.

== History ==
GPA is thought to have first arisen in the 1950s, when the development of the oil industry in the area resulted in the arrival of migrant workers. Other researchers place the emergence of GPA later, in the 1970s or 1980s.

Gulf Pidgin Arabic is generally understood to have developed through sustained contact between Arabic speakers and migrant workers from South and Southeast Asia. Its formation may have been shaped by simplified registers of Arabic known as Foreigner Talk, used by native speakers when communicating with non-native workers, as well as by interactions among migrant workers with diverse linguistic backgrounds.

== Social context ==
A number of migrant workers hailing from South Asia (Bangladesh, India, Iran, Nepal, Pakistan, Sri Lanka) and Southeast Asia (Indonesia, the Philippines, Thailand) work in the Persian Gulf region. These workers speak a variety of languages, but are unlikely to speak Arabic. However, because these workers are never naturalized, nor do they marry and start families, there are no native speakers of the language, thereby preventing it from developing into a creole. The systemic oppression of migrant workers has also been detrimental to the growth and depth of GPA. In the infrequent cases of intermarriage between migrant workers and Arabic speakers, the migrant worker tends to favor Arabic rather than GPA when interacting with their spouse. For workers who do permanently settle in the region, the social stigma attached to GPA incentivizes them to learn Gulf Arabic in order to gain social prestige.

== Usage ==
Gulf Pidgin Arabic (GPA) is primarily used between migrant workers, who are non-native speakers of Arabic, and their Arabic-speaking employers. It is also used between migrant workers if they lack another common language. Other languages, such as English, Arabic dialects from outside of the Persian Gulf region, Gulf Arabic, and Persian might be used alongside it. Speakers of GPA may also borrow words or simple phrases or sentences from these other languages to better facilitate communication.

Social stigma is attached to speaking GPA, which is sometimes used humorously.

== Features ==
Generally speaking, GPA does not have a vowel length distinction, which is present in Gulf Arabic. GPA also does not geminate consonants.

=== Phonetic shifts ===
Phonetic shifts are dependent on the speaker's native language. The amount of time workers spend in the region also tends to correspond to pronunciations that more closely resemble Gulf Arabic.

Phoneme	Gulf Arabic	Gulf Pidgin Arabic
/x/ خ	/x/	/k/
/ɣ/ غ	/ɣ/	/g/

=== Vocabulary ===
GPA borrows from English as well as Arabic in its lexicon, although these loanwords do usually have already-existing equivalents in Arabic. Personal pronouns are underdeveloped, with the singular first person and singular second-person being most commonly used.

=== Grammar ===
Verbs in GPA do not conjugate for person; rather, the third person singular masculine imperfect form is used in all cases. Aspect and tense markers are missing, so speakers must glean that information from context. GPA does not utilize the Arabic dual noun form. Instead, speakers preface nouns with the cardinal number two. Reduplication with both Arabic and English words is used to emphasize or intensify that word's meaning.

Another innovation in GPA is the use of "fi" as a copula, which Gulf Arabic lacks in the present tense.

In terms of negation, Gulf Pidgin Arabic uses the negative particle maafi which comes from Gulf Arabic meaning "there isn't". In GPA, maafi serves as a general-purpose negator, used not only in existential and equational but also with main verbs. Alternatives such as maa and mub (both meaning “not” in Gulf Arabic) are also occasionally used.

The pronominal system in Gulf Pidgin Arabic (GPA) is significantly simpler than that of Gulf Arabic. Speakers predominantly use three independent pronouns: ana ("I"), inta ("you"), and huwa ("him"), along with the possessive suffix -i ("my"). Other forms are rare.

Word order in GPA tends to follow a subject–verb–object (SVO) pattern, which is the most common structure among pidgin languages.
