= Juba Arabic =

Lingua franca spoken in South Sudan

- South Sudanese Creole Arabic
- arabi juba, luġa
- Native to: South Sudan
- Speakers: L1: 250,000 (2020); L2: 1.2 million (2019)
- Language family: Arabic-based creole: Juba Arabic
- Early form: Bimbashi Arabic
- Writing system: Latin alphabet

Language codes
- ISO 639-3: pga
- Glottolog: suda1237
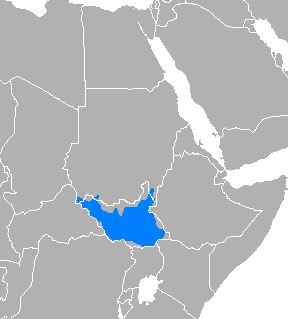

Juba Arabic (Arabi Juba, عربی جوبا; Standard Arabic: عربية جوبا, romanized: ‘Arabiyyat Jūbā), also known since 2011 as South Sudanese Arabic, is a lingua franca spoken mainly in Equatoria Province in South Sudan, and derives its name from the South Sudanese capital, Juba. It is also spoken among communities of people from South Sudan living in towns in Sudan. The pidgin developed in the 19th century, among descendants of Sudanese soldiers, many of whom were recruited from southern Sudan. Residents of other large towns in South Sudan, notably Malakal and Wau, do not generally speak Juba Arabic, tending towards the use of Arabic closer to Sudanese Arabic, in addition to local languages. Reportedly, it is the most spoken language in South Sudan (more so than the official language English) despite government attempts to discourage its use due to its association with past Arab rule.

== Classification ==
Juba derives from a pidgin based on Sudanese Arabic. It has a vastly simplified grammar and is influenced by South Sudan's local languages, such as Dinka, Bari, Pojulu and Shilluk. DeCamp, writing in the mid-1970s, classifies Juba Arabic as a pidgin rather than a creole language (meaning that it is not passed on by parents to their children as a first language), though Mahmud, writing slightly later, appears to equivocate on this issue (see references below). Mahmoud's work is politically significant as it represented the first recognition by a northern Sudanese intellectual that Juba Arabic was not merely "Arabic spoken badly" but is a distinct dialect.

Because of the civil war in southern Sudan from 1983, more recent research on this issue has been restricted. However, the growth in the size of Juba town since the beginning of the civil war, its relative isolation from much of its hinterland during this time, together with the relative collapse of state-run education systems in the government held garrison town (that would have further encouraged the use of Arabic as opposed to Juba Arabic), may have changed patterns of usage and transmission of Juba Arabic since the time of the last available research. Further research is required to determine the extent to which Juba Arabic may now be considered a creole rather than a pidgin language.

== Phonology ==
=== Vowels ===
Each vowel in Juba Arabic comes in more open/more close pairs. It is more open in two environments: stressed syllables preceding /ɾ/, and unstressed syllables. For example, contrast the /i/ in girish [ˈɡɪ.ɾɪɕ] "piastre", and mile [ˈmi.lɛ] "salt"; or the /e/ in deris [ˈdɛ.ɾɪs] "lesson", and leben [ˈle.bɛn] "milk".

As opposed to Standard Arabic, Juba Arabic makes no distinction between short and long vowels. However, long vowels in Standard Arabic often become stressed in Juba Arabic. Stress can be grammatical, such as in weledu [ˈwe.lɛ.dʊ] "to give birth", and weleduu [wɛ.lɛˈdu] "to be born".

Juba Arabic vowel phonemes
	Front	Back
Close	ɪ~i ⟨i⟩	ʊ~u ⟨u⟩
Mid	ɛ~e ⟨e⟩	ɔ~o ⟨o⟩
Open	a ⟨a⟩	

=== Consonants ===
Juba Arabic omits some of the consonants found in Standard Arabic. In particular, Juba Arabic makes no distinction between pairs of plain and emphatic consonants (e.g. س sīn and ص ṣād), keeping only the plain variant. Moreover, ع ʿayn is never pronounced, while ه hāʾ and ح ḥāʾ may be pronounced [h] or omitted altogether. Conversely, Juba Arabic uses consonants not found in Standard Arabic: v /β/, ny /ɲ/, and ng /ŋ/. Finally, consonant doubling, also known as gemination or tashdid in Arabic, is absent in Juba Arabic. Compare Standard Arabic سُكَّر sukkar and Juba Arabic sukar, meaning "sugar".

In the following table, the common Latin transcriptions appear between angle brackets next to the phonemes. Parentheses indicate phonemes that are either relatively rare or are more likely to be used in the "educated" register of Juba Arabic.

Juba Arabic consonant phonemes
		Bilabial	Alveolar	Alveolo-palatal	Velar	Glottal
Nasal		m ⟨m⟩	n ⟨n⟩	ɲ̟ ⟨ny⟩	ŋ ⟨ng⟩	
Plosive	Voiceless		t ⟨t⟩		k ⟨k⟩	(ʔ) ⟨'⟩ (Note: Glottal stops are rare, but necessary in some words, such as la' meaning "no".)
Plosive	Voiced	b ⟨b⟩	d ⟨d⟩	ɟ̟ ⟨j⟩	ɡ ⟨g⟩	
Fricative	Voiceless	ɸ ⟨f⟩	s ⟨s⟩	(ɕ) ⟨sh⟩ (Note: ⟨sh⟩ is rare and may often be pronounced [s].)		(h) ⟨h⟩ (Note: ⟨h⟩ is rare and may often not be pronounced at all.)
Fricative	Voiced	β ⟨v⟩	z ⟨z⟩ (Note: ⟨z⟩ can be a sign of education in some areas, but is common in some rural dialects.)			
Flap			ɾ ⟨r⟩			
Approximant		w ⟨w⟩	l ⟨l⟩	j ⟨y⟩		

== Orthography ==
Juba Arabic has no standardised orthography, but the Latin alphabet is widely used. A dictionary was published in 2005, Kamuus ta Arabi Juba wa Ingliizi, using the Latin script.

== Vocabulary ==
The following is a sample vocabulary taken from Smith and Ama (1985):

Juba Arabic	Origin	English
gelba	From Arabic قَلْب qalb	heart
januub	From Arabic جَنُوب janūb	south
jidaada	From Sudanese Arabic جدادة jidāda, from Arabic دَجَاجَة dajāja (with metathesis)	chicken
tarabeeza	From Sudanese Arabic طربيزة ṭarabēza, from Greek τραπέζι trapézi	table
yatu	From Sudanese Arabic ياتو yātu	which
bafra	From Dinka bafora	cassava

== See also ==
- Languages of South Sudan
- Varieties of Arabic
- Sudanese Arabic
- Bimbashi Arabic

== Bibliography ==
- DeCamp, D (1977), "The Development of Pidgin and Creole Studies", in Valdman, A (ed.), Pidgin and Creole Linguistics, Indiana University Press
- Mahmud, Ashari Ahmed (1979), Linguistic Variation and Change in the Aspectual System of Juba Arabic, Washington, D.C.: Georgetown University Press
- Mahmud, Ashari Ahmed (1983), Arabic in the Southern Sudan: History and the Spread of a Pidgin-Creole, Khartoum
- Abdel Salam, A.H.; De Waal, A (2004), "On the failure and persistence of Islam", in De Waal (ed.), Islamism and Its Enemies in the Horn of Africa, Bloomington & Indianapolis: Indiana University Press, pp. 21–70, ISBN 0-253-34403-4
- Kevlihan, Rob (2007), "Beyond Creole Nationalism? Language Policies, Education and the Challenge of state building in southern Sudan", Ethnopolitics, 6 (4): 513–543, doi:10.1080/17449050701252791, S2CID 145012523
- Manfredi, Stefano (2017), Arabi Juba: un pidgin-créole du Soudan du Sud, Leuven-Paris: Peeters, ISBN 978-90-429-3504-4
- Manfredi, Stefano; Petrollino, Sara (2013), "Juba Arabic", in S. Michaelis; P. Maurer; M. Haspelmath; M. Huber (eds.), The Survey of Pidgin and Creole Languages Volume III. Contact Languages Based on Languages from Africa, Australia, and the Americas., Oxford: Oxford University Press, pp. 54–65, ISBN 978-0-19-969142-5
- Manfredi, Stefano, and Mauro Tosco. "Juba Arabic (ÁRABI JÚBA): A ‘less indigenous’ language of South Sudan." Sociolinguistic Studies 12, no. 2 (2018): 209-230.
- Leonardi, Cherry. "South Sudanese Arabic and the negotiation of the local state, c. 1840–2011." The Journal of African History 54, no. 3 (2013): 351–372.
- Miller, Catherine. "Southern Sudanese Arabic and the churches." Revue roumaine de linguistique 3 (2010): 383–400
- Tosco, Mauro (1995), "A pidgin verbal system: the case of Juba Arabic", Anthropological Linguistics, 37 (4): 423–459
- Tosco, Mauro; Manfredi, Stefano (2013), "Pidgins and Creoles", in J. Owens (ed.), The Oxford Handbook of Arabic Linguistics, Oxford: Oxford University Press, pp. 495–519, ISBN 9780199344093
- Watson, Richard L. (2015). Juba Arabic for Beginners. South Sudan: SIL International. ISBN 978-1556713736.

== Other Readings ==
- Nakao, Shuichiro. 2018. "Mountains do not meet, but men do." Arabic in Contact, edited by Stefano Mandfredi and Mauro Tosco, 275-294. John Benjamins Publishing.
- (in Italian) Manfredi, Stefano "Juba Arabic: A Grammatical Description of Juba Arabic with Sociolinguistic notes about the Sudanese community in Cairo", Università degli Studi di Napoli "L'Orientale". (unpublished thesis)
- (in French) Miller, Catherine, 1983, "Le Juba-Arabic, une lingua-franca du Sudan méridional; remarques sur le fonctionnment du verbe", Cahiers du Mas-Gelles, 1, Paris, Geuthner, pp 105–118.
- (in French) Miller, Catherine, 1983, "Aperçu du système verbal en Juba-Arabic", Comptes rendu du GLECS, XXIV–XXVIII, 1979–1984, T. 2, Paris, Geuthner, pp 295–315.
- (in English) Watson, Richard L., (1989), "An Introduction to Juba Arabic", Occasional Papers in the Study of Sudanese Languages, 6: 95–117.
