= Languages of the Nuba Mountains =

Diverse set of languages of southern Sudan

Map of the language families, subfamilies and languages spoken in the Nuba Mountains

The Nuba Mountains, located in the West Kordofan and South Kordofan states in the south of Sudan, are inhabited by a diverse set of populations (collectively known as Nuba peoples) speaking various languages not closely related to one another.

The vast diversity of languages among the Nuba Mountains indicates that the mountains served as a retreat area by many people in the past.

== Languages ==
In addition to Sudanese Arabic, around 42 other languages are spoken in the Nuba Mountains. They belong to the Daju, Hill Nubian, Kadu, Katla, Lafofa, Nyima, Rashad, Talodi–Heiban and Temein language groups. Five of these families (Daju, Hill Nubian, Kadu, Nyima and Temein) belong to the Nilo-Saharan language family, while four (Katla, Lafofa, Rashad and Talodi–Heiban) belong to the Niger–Congo language family. Kadu's relationship to Nilo-Saharan is uncertain; it was previously classified as Niger–Congo, and a conservative classification would consider it an independent family.

Previously, the four Niger–Congo language groups along with the Nilo-Saharan Kadu group were classified together as the Kordofanian languages. However, Kordofanian is no longer considered a valid family. The Kordofanian languages may be the oldest group of languages in the region.

Almost all of the languages spoken in the Nuba Mountains are indigenous to the mountains and found nowhere else. The only exceptions are the Daju languages, the rest of which belong to Western Daju and are found in eastern Chad, and Sudanese Arabic, which is spoken in the rest of Sudan.

== Internal classifications ==
The languages of the Nuba Mountains belong to several distinct subdivisions of their respective languages families.

Bold = exclusive to the Nuba Mountains

=== Niger–Congo ===
- Niger–Congo
  - **Katla**
  - **Rashad**
  - Atlantic–Congo
    - **Lafofa**
    - **Talodi–Heiban**
      - **Talodi**
      - **Heiban**

Note: Atlantic–Congo is a major division of Niger–Congo which only excludes the Mande, Ijoid and Dogon languages of West Africa, along with the Katla and Rashad languages of the Nuba Mountains.

=== Nilo-Saharan ===
- Nilo-Saharan
  - **Kadu**
  - Eastern Sudanic
    - Kir–Abbaian
      - **Temein**
      - **Daju**
    - Astaboran languages
      - **Nyima**
      - Nubian languages
        - **Hill Nubian**

Notes:

- Eastern Sudanic is a large division of Nilo-Saharan spoken throughout the upper Nile region. Southern Eastern and Northern Eastern are the two branches of Eastern Sudanic, roughly distributed in the south and north of the region, respectively.
- The Nubian languages are spoken mostly in northern Sudan and southern Egypt. Only Midob and the extinct Birgid are found in southern Sudan, along with the Hill Nubian languages of the Nuba Mountains.

== See also ==
- Kordofanian languages
- Languages of Sudan
