= Tima people =

Tima
Regions with significant populations
- South Kordofan

Languages
- Tima

Related ethnic groups
- Heiban, Talodi

The Tima also known as Lamarik are an ethnic group of the Nuba Mountains in South Kordofan state, in southern Sudan. They number several thousand people.

== Language ==
The Tima people speak Tima, which is in the Kordofanian languages group (of the Nuba Mountains), in the major Niger-Congo language family.

== See also ==
- Heiban Nuba people
- Talodi people
