= Katla =

Katla may refer to:

- Katla (volcano), in Iceland
- Katla people, in Sudan
- Katla languages, a language family of Sudan
- Katla language, a language of Sudan
- Katla basketball team, a basketball club in Iceland
- Katla (dragon), a fictional character from the Swedish children's book The Brothers Lionheart by Astrid Lindgren
- Katla (album), by Ida Maria
- Katla (TV series), a 2021 Icelandic drama television series
- Catla, a fish often spelt as "Katla".

== People with the name ==
- Katla (musician), Finnish singer
- Katla M. Þorgeirsdóttir (born 1970), Icelandic actress, voice actress and writer

== See also ==
- Katla Geopark, in Iceland
