= Rashad languages =

Small language family of the Nuba Mountains of Sudan

Rashad
- Tegali–Tagoi
- Geographic distribution: Nuba Hills, Sudan
- Linguistic classification: Niger–Congo?: Katla–Rashad; Rashad
- Subdivisions: Tegali; Tagoi

Language codes
- Glottolog: rash1249
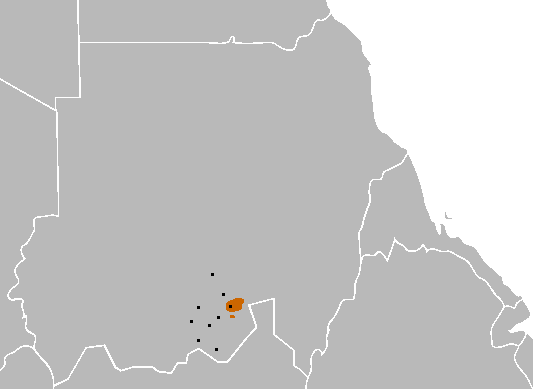

The Rashad languages form a small language family in the Nuba Hills of Sudan. They are named after Rashad District of South Kordofan.

== Classification ==
Part of an erstwhile Kordofanian proposal, they are of uncertain position within the Niger–Congo family. It was at first thought that they shared the characteristic morphology of Niger–Congo, such as the noun-class system. However, only the Tagoi branch has noun classes, and Blench remarks that it appears to have been borrowed. Thus, he classifies Rashad as a divergent branch of Niger–Congo outside the Atlantic–Congo core. A similar situation holds for another Kordofanian family, Katla; these are not closely related to Rashad.

Unlike the neighbouring Talodi-Heiban languages which have SVO word order, Rashad languages (and also Lafofa) have SOV word order.

== Languages ==
The number of Rashad languages varies among descriptions, from two (Williamson & Blench 2000, reflected in the ISO codes) to seven (Blench ms, shown here).

- Rashad
  - Tagoi
    - Goy (Tagoi)
    - Umali (Tumale)
    - Moreb
    - Orig (Turjuk)
  - Tegali
    - Tegali (Tingal, Kajakja)
    - Gom (Rashad)

== See also ==
- Rashad word lists (Wiktionary)
