= Tingal =

Ivan Tingal may refer to:

- the Tingal people
- the Tingal language
