= Tukam people =

Tukam
Regions with significant populations
- Nuba Hills

Languages
- Tagoi

Related ethnic groups
- Tagale

Tukam is an ethnic group in the Nuba Hills in South Kurdufan in Sudan. They speak the Tagoi language.
