= Tegal (disambiguation) =

Tegal is a city in Central Java, Indonesia.

Tegal may also refer to:

- Tegal Regency, a regency in the northwest part of Central Java, Indonesia
- Tegal language, or Tegal dialect, a Javanese language spoken in Indonesia
- Tegal Corporation, former name of CollabRx, a medical company

== See also ==
- Tegali language, spoken in Sudan
  - Taqali (also spelled Tegali), a former state in modern-day central Sudan
- Tegel (disambiguation)
