= Tagale people =

The Tagale, also known as Tegali, are a sub-ethnic group of the Nuba peoples who live in the Rashad Nuba Mountains of South Kordofan state, in southern Sudan. They are mostly Christians and numbered 35,738 thousand in 1984.

They speak Tegali of the Kordofanian languages group, in the major Niger–Congo language family.

== See also ==
- Index: Nuba peoples
