= Languages of Sudan =

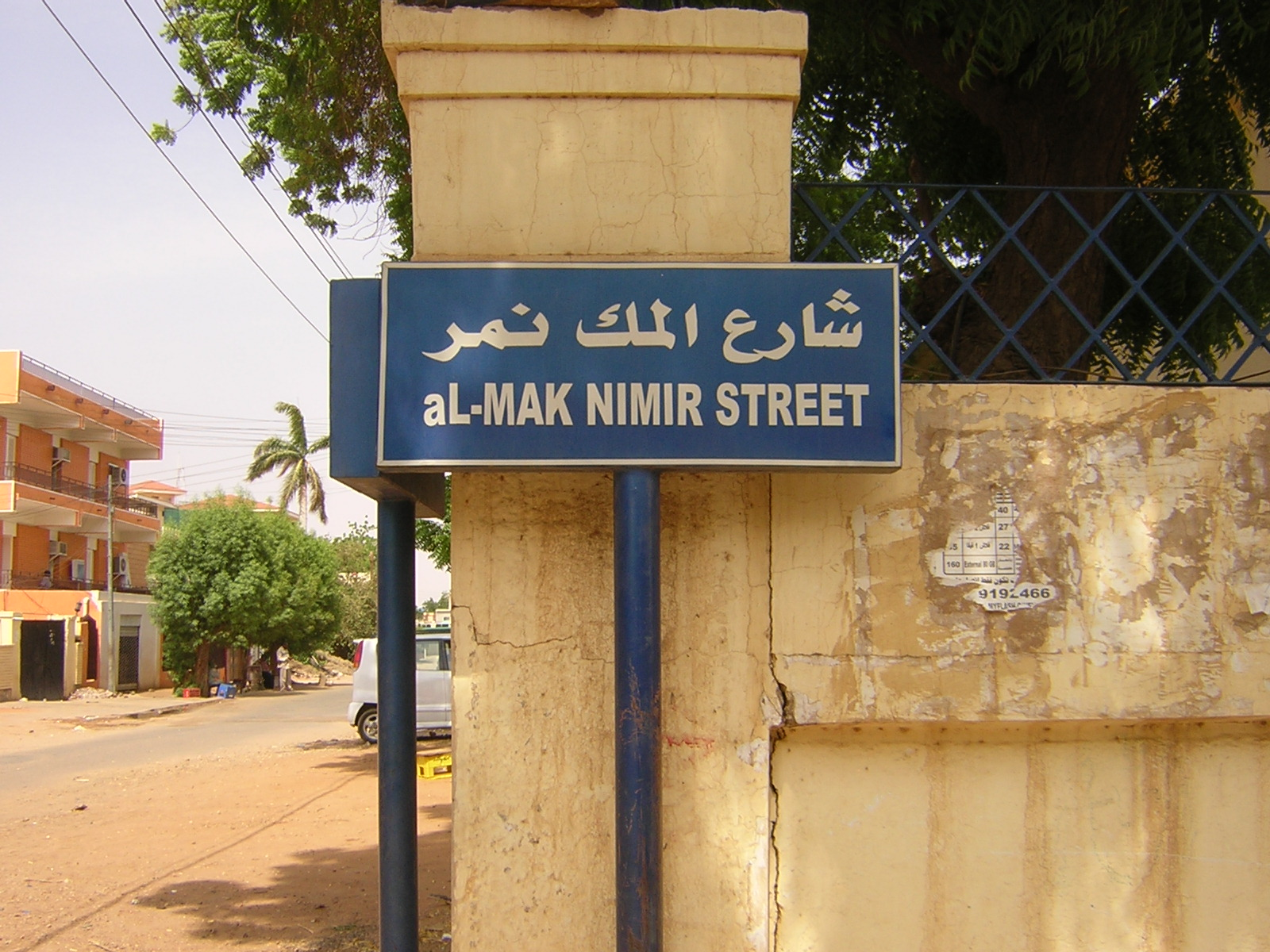
- Bilingual Arabic–English street sign in Khartoum
- Official: Arabic, English
- Regional: Beja, Nubian, Fur
- Vernacular: Sudanese Arabic
- Minority: Masalit, Zaghawa, Tigre, languages of the Nuba Mountains
- Foreign: Hausa, Fula, Kanuri, English
- Signed: Sudanese sign languages
- Keyboard layout: QWERTY, Arabic keyboard

Linguistic map of the non-Arab peoples of Darfur.

Clickable map of the language families, subfamilies, and languages spoken in the Nuba Mountains. Kordofanian includes Kadu and all of the Niger–Congo branches.

Sudan is a multilingual country dominated by Sudanese Arabic. In the 2005 constitution of the Republic of Sudan, the official languages of Sudan are Literary Arabic and English.

== Languages ==
Most languages spoken in Africa fall into four language families. Three of them—Afro-Asiatic, Niger-Congo, and Nilo-Saharan—are represented in Sudan. Each is divided into groups that are in turn subdivided into sets of closely related languages. Two or more major groups of each of the three families are present in Sudan, historically both a north–south and an east–west migration crossroads. As of 2024, Ethnologue lists 81 languages spoken in Sudan.

The most widely spoken language in Sudan is Arabic, a member of the Semitic branch of the Afro-Asiatic language family, represented by the Sudanese dialect. Cushitic, another major branch of Afro-Asiatic, is represented by Bedawiye (with several dialects), spoken by the largely nomadic Beja people. Nevertheless, some of them speak the Semitic Tigre language. Chadic, a third Afro-Asiatic branch, is represented by its most important single language, Hausa, a West African tongue used in Nigeria by the Hausa people and employed by many other West Africans in Sudan as a lingua franca. Several lingua francas have emerged, and many peoples have become genuinely multilingual, fluent in a native language spoken at home, a lingua franca, and perhaps other languages. Arabic, however, has several different forms, and not all who master one are able to use another. Among the varieties noted by scholars are classical Arabic, the language of the Quran, not a widespread spoken language and mostly used in Islamic rites and poetry. Although some Muslims might become acquainted with classical Arabic in the course of rudimentary religious schooling, very few except the most educated know it by rote.

Modern Standard Arabic, derived from classical Arabic, is used by the educated in travel outside the country. Then there are at least two kinds of colloquial Arabic in Sudan—that spoken in roughly the eastern half of the country and known as Sudanese or Omdurmani colloquial Arabic, and that spoken in Western Sudan, closely akin to the colloquial Arabic spoken in Chad. There are other colloquial forms.

Modern Standard Arabic is in principle the same everywhere in the Arab world and generally permits communication among educated persons whose mother tongue is one or another form of colloquial Arabic. It has been the language used in Sudan's central government, the press, Sudan television, and Radio Omdurman. The latter also broadcast in classical Arabic. One observer, writing in the early 1970s, noted that Arabic speakers (and others who had acquired the language informally) in western Sudan found it easier to understand the Chadian colloquial Arabic used by Chad Radio than the Modern Standard Arabic used by Radio Omdurman. This may also be the case elsewhere in rural Sudan, where villagers and nomads speak a local dialect of Arabic.

Niger-Kordofanian is first divided into Niger–Congo and Kordofanian. The widespread Niger–Congo language group includes many divisions and subdivisions of languages. Represented in Sudan are Azande and several other tongues of the Adamawa-Eastern language division, and Fulani of the West Atlantic division. The Kordofanian stock comprises only 30 to 40 languages spoken in a limited area of Sudan—the Nuba Mountains and their environs.

The designation of a Nilo-Saharan superstock has not been fully accepted by linguists, and its constituent groups and subgroups are not firmly fixed, in part because many of the languages have not been well studied. Assuming the validity of this language family and its internal divisions, then 10 of its 12 major divisions and many of their subdivisions are well represented in Sudan, where roughly 75 languages, well over half of those named in the 1955–56 census, could be identified as Nilo-Saharan. Many of these languages are only used by small groups of people. Only six or seven of them were spoken by 1 percent or more of Sudan's 1956 population. Perhaps another dozen were the home languages of 0.5 to 1 percent. Included among Nilo-Saharan languages are Masalit in North Darfur; various Nubian dialects of Northern Sudan; and Jieng (Dinka) and Naadh (Nuer) in Southern Sudan.

Many other languages are spoken by a few thousand or even a few hundred people. Sudan also has multiple regional sign languages, which are not mutually intelligible. By 2009 a proposal for a unified language had been worked out, but is not widely known.

== Language policies ==
Under the 1998 constitution, only Arabic was the official language. Nonetheless, English was acknowledged as the principal language in the South into the 1990s. It was also the chief language at the University of Khartoum and was the language of secondary schools even in the North before 1969. In the early 1970s in the South, the first two years of primary school were taught in the local language. Thereafter, through secondary school, either Arabic or English could be the medium of instruction (English and Arabic were regarded as of equal importance); the language not used as a medium was taught as a subject. At the time when this option was established, roughly half the general secondary schools (equivalent to grades seven through nine) were conducted in Arabic and half in English in what were then Bahr al-Ghazal and AlIstiwai States.

The new policy for higher education announced by the Sudanese government in 1990, however, dictated that Arabic would be the language of instruction in all institutions of higher learning (see Education in Sudan). This policy was reversed by provisions of the Comprehensive Peace Agreement of 2005 that were incorporated into Sudan's Interim National Constitution. These provisions established both Arabic and English as official working languages of the national government and as the languages of instruction in higher education. The constitution declared further that "all indigenous languages of the Sudan are national languages and shall be respected, developed, and promoted", and it allowed any legislative body below the national level to adopt any other national language(s) as additional official working language(s) within that body's jurisdiction. These changes began working their way into public life and into secondary and higher education.

== Literacy and education ==
The literacy rate is 70.2% of total population, male: 79.6%, female: 60.8%.

== See also ==
- Languages of South Sudan
