= Tagoi language =

Kordofanian language spoken in Sudan

Tagoi
- ŋɔ̧́ɡɔ̧́lɛ̧́
- Native to: Sudan
- Region: Nuba Hills
- Ethnicity: Tukam
- Native speakers: 29,000 (2022)
- Language family: Niger–Congo?: Kordofanian; Rashad; Tagoi
- Dialects: Tagoi; Moreb; Tumale

Language codes
- ISO 639-3: tag
- Glottolog: tago1246
- ELP: Tagoi
- Tagoi is classified as Severely Endangered by the UNESCO Atlas of the World's Languages in Danger.

The Tagoi language is a Kordofanian language, closely related to Tegali, spoken near the town of Rashad in southern Kordofan in Sudan, about 12 N, 31 E. Unlike Tegali, it has a complex noun class system, which appears to have been borrowed from more typical Niger–Congo languages. It has several dialects, including Umali (Tumale), Goy (Tagoi proper), Moreb, and Orig (ŋóóriɡ, Turjuk). Villages are Moreb, Tagoi, Tukum, Tuling, Tumale, Turjok, and Turum (Ethnologue, 22nd edition).

The following describes the Orig dialect.

== Phonology ==
The consonants are:

	Bilabial	Alveolar	Palatal	Velar
Nasal	m	n	ɲ	ŋ
Stop	p	t	c	k
Fricative	f	s		
Approximant		l	j	w
Trill		r		

Stops /p, t, c, k/ are automatically voiced as [b, d, ɟ, ɡ], between two non-obstruents (obstruents = stops or fricatives.)

Stops and sonorants may occur geminate. Some consonant clusters are allowed (almost invariably two-consonant), most involving sonorants; prenasalised ones are particularly common.

[ʃ, h, z] are found in some Arabic loanwords.

The vowel system is unclear; phonetically, it seems to be basically: /a, e, i, o, u, ɛ, ɔ, ɪ, ʊ, ə/.

There seem to be three phonemic tones: high, low, and occasionally falling.

Schadeberg & Elias 1979 note short vowels with a cedilla, normal vowels with a single letter and long vowels by double the letter, for example a̧, a, aa. The two central vowels are described as "less dark" ə͔ and "darker" ə͕ than ə.

== Grammar ==
=== Nouns ===
Each noun consists of a prefix plus a stem; the prefix identifies its noun class. It changes according to number.

The genders include:

- w-, pl. y-: this gender seems to consist mainly of persons and animals. E.g.: wùttar, 'chief' > yáttar, 'chiefs'; wín, 'snake' > yínét, 'snakes'.
- bilabial-, pl. yi-, including several trees; e.g. wòr, 'um-kaddaqi tree' > yíwóórèn, púrn, 'upper arm' > yìbúrn.
- pl. with no initial change, including a number of kinship terms; e.g. màrá, 'road' > màrnát, àppá, 'father' > àppánàt
- t-, pl. y-: mostly body parts; e.g. tárák, 'skin' > yárák, téŋlàk, 'tongue' > yáŋùlàk.
- t-, pl. ŋ-: almost exclusively body parts; e.g. téŋlàk, 'tongue' > ŋéŋlàk, tìɲèn, 'tooth' > ŋìɲèn.
- t- with no plural: place names, mass nouns
- y-, pl. ŋ-: notably fruits and body parts, but also a wide variety of others. E.g. yé, 'egg' > ŋíye; yìmbó, 'knee' > ŋìmbó.
- ŋ- with no plural: languages, liquids, possibly verbal nouns; e.g. ŋə͕́gdìráá, 'Arabic' (< kə̀dráá, 'Arab'), ŋàì, 'water'.
- k-, pl. s-: seems to be the commonest gender, includes all sorts of semantic fields; e.g. kábà, 'hut' > sábà, kám, 'hair' > sám, kàdìrú, 'pig' > sàdìrú.
- c-, pl. ɲ-: includes a wide variety of semantic fields; derives diminutives; e.g.: cíŋ, 'child, boy' > ɲín; cúdén, 'bird' > ɲúdén.

In genitive (possessive) constructions, the head noun is followed by a linking element which agrees with it in class, followed by the possessor noun; e.g. ɲín ɲi-adam, 'children of Adam'; kʊs ki-gai, 'skull (ie bone of head)'.

=== Adjectives ===
Adjectives follow the noun, and agree in noun class, i.e. in gender and number; e.g. kús kàlló "a thin bone" > sús sàlló "thin bones".

==== Demonstratives ====
Demonstratives too follow the noun, and agree in class. There are:

- three short : -i- "this" (with the agreement prefix copied after the i as well as before), -ur, -un "that". E.g.: gálám kɛ́k "this pencil" > sálmát sɛ́s "these pencils"; gálám kur "that pencil".
- three long, formed by adding (-)-an to the previous; e.g. wùskén wèwán "this knife", gálám kurkan "that pencil".

=== Numbers ===
The numbers one to four are normal adjectives; e.g. yʊ́r yùkók "two hands". Other numbers' behavior is unknown. When used without a head noun, they appear as follows, with the prefix w- for numbers 1-5:

1. wàttá, ùttá
2. wùkkók
3. wìttá
4. wàrʊ̀m
5. wʊ̧̀ràm
6. ɲérér
7. ʊ̀mʊ̀rgʊ́
8. tùppá
9. kʊ́mnàsá(n)
10. kʊ́mán

=== Pronouns ===
The pronouns are as follows:

	Independent	Possessive (agree in class)	Verb subject	Verb object
I	yìgə͕́n	-ìríŋ	y-	àd-
you (sg.)	ɔ̀gə͔́n	-ìrɔ́ŋ	w-	nú-
he/she/it	tùgə͔́n	-ùrúŋ	-	(í-?)
we	nìgə͕́n	-ìrín	n-	àníŋg(ì)-
you (pl.)	nɔ̀gə͔́n	-ìrɔ́n	ŋ-	núng(ì)-
they	nɛ̀gə͔́n	-ìrɛ́n	t-	níng(ì)-

Examples of verbal personal inflection: Musa àdúbìr "Musa beat me"; yàyá "I drink".

Interrogative pronouns include agn "what?", tá̧jí̧n "who?", nɛ́gán "where?", cínàcɛ̀n "which (boy)?"

=== Verbs ===
There appear to be at least four basic forms: present (e.g. y-ìlàm "I see"), past (e.g., y-ílàm "I saw"), imperative (e.g. k-ìlmɛ́ "see! (sg.)), and negative imperative (e.g., ánák w-èlm-ò "don't see! (sg.)). The difference between present and past is typically marked by tone: LH or occasionally LL in the present, HL in the past. Sometimes vowel changes are also observed. In the imperative, some verbs take a k- prefix, others do not; this may depend on whether or not the verb begins with a vowel.

The verb "to be" has different roots according to tense: -ɛ́n in the present tense, -ɪ́rɪ̀n in the past tense.

Negation of the verb is expressed by a prefix k-, followed by the verb "to be", inflected for person; negation of the verb "to be", by k-àrà in the present tense, k-ɪ̀rá in the past.

Verbal nouns include agent nouns in t- (e.g., t-ubi "beater"), gerunds in t- (e.g., t-àyá "drinkable"), and action nouns (e.g., ŋ-ìlàm "sight".)

=== Syntax ===
The basic word order is subject–object–verb, including in the imperative. Locative complements also precede the verb. Nominal sentences use the verb "to be". Modifiers consistently follow their head nouns.
