= Katla language =

Katla language of Sudan

Katla
- Kaalak
- Native to: Sudan
- Region: Nuba Hills
- Ethnicity: Katla, Gulud
- Native speakers: 25,000 Julud (2009); Possibly 14,000 Katla (1984)
- Language family: Niger–Congo?: Kordofanian; Katla; Katla
- Dialects: Katla-Cakom; Katla-Kulharong; Julud

Language codes
- ISO 639-3: kcr
- Glottolog: katl1237 Katla julu1237 Julud
- ELP: Katla

Katla (also Kaalak or Kwaalak) is a Katla language, closely related to a neighbouring language called Tima. Katla is generally classified as Kordofanian, which is not a uniform branch, and is native to the Nuba Mountains. While Jalad is seen a dialect there is a clear distinction between the two groups. Similarly one can distinguish Katla into east and west Katla dialects, it is believed to be spoken in 11 villages around Jebel Katla and their ethnicity is kàlàk.

The variety Julud is mutually intelligible with Katla-Kulharong but not with Katla-Cakom.

== Phonology ==
=== Consonants ===
		Labial	Dental	Alveolar	Post- alveolar	Velar	Labial- velar	Glottal
Plosive	voiceless		t̪	t	(c)	k	k͡p	(ʔ)
Plosive	voiced	b	d̪	d	ɟ	ɡ	ɡ͡b	
Plosive	prenasal	ᵐb	ⁿd̪	ⁿd	ᶮɟ	ᵑɡ		
Fricative				s	(ʃ)			h
Nasal		m		n	ɲ	ŋ		
Rhotic				r	ɽ			
Approximant		w		l	j			

Sounds [c] and [ʃ] occur as realizations of /s/.

Consonants in the Julut dialect
		Labial	Dental/ Alveolar	Retroflex	Palatal	Velar	Labial-velar
Plosive	voiceless		t̪	ʈ		k	k͡p
Plosive	voiced	b	d̪	ɖ	ɟ	ɡ	ɡ͡b
Plosive	prenasal	ᵐb	ⁿd̪	ᶯɖ	ᶮɟ	ᵑɡ	
Fricative		f	s		ʃ		
Nasal		m	n		ɲ	ŋ	
Rhotic			r	ɽ			
Approximant		w	l		j		

=== Vowels ===
	Front	Central	Back
Close	i		u
Mid	e	ə	o
Mid	ɛ	ə	ɔ
Open		a	

/i, u/ can also be realized as [ɪ, ʊ].

Vowels in the Julut dialect
	Front	Central	Back
Close	i		u
Close	ɪ		ʊ
Mid	e	ə	o
Mid	ɛ	ə	ɔ
Open		ɐ	
Open		a	

== Nouns ==
=== Plural ===
Most of the time nouns in Katla do not have a plural, either numbers are put in front of the word or a quantifier is used. Often loanwords do not follow this rule and therefore change in their plural form.

=== Genitive case ===
In some cases Katla places the genitive after the subject, as in other Sudanese languages: ‚u gbalana‘ " the dog’s owner ". Usually this is avoided and put in between both nouns: ‚gas i gu‘ „the dog’s head“.

=== Subjective case ===
The subjective case is put infringement of the verb. In the case of multiple objects each one gets a case:

‘gu šekemole retet’ “The dog bit the gazelle”

== Pronouns ==
	singular	plural
1st person	Ṇ-	Ni-, N-, Ń-
2nd person	Dj-	Dj-
3rd person	Y-	Y-

== Numbers ==
1. tẹták
2. sẹk
3. hātẹd
4. agálam
5. jẹgwūlẹn
6. djọltẹn
7. djolēk
8. taṅgẹl
9. djalbatẹn
10. rākwẹs

== Dialects and locations ==
Dialects and village locations:

- Julud dialect: Kabog, Kabog North, Kabosh, Kambai, Karkando, Karkarya, Kary, Kimndang, Kitanngo, Kolbi, Koto Kork, Octiang, Rumber, Sabba, and Tolot
- Katla dialect: Bombori, Karoka, Kateik, Kiddu, Kirkpong, and Koldrong

== Bibliography ==
- Hellwig, Birgit (2013). "Verbal morphology in Katla". In Thilo C. Schadeberg; Roger M. Blench (eds.). Nuba Mountain Language Studies. Cologne: Köppe. pp. 237–250.
- Meinhof, Carl (1917). Sprachstudien im egyptischen Sudan 14: Katla. Zeitschrift für Kolonialsprachen VII.
