= Proto-Niger–Congo language =

Reconstructed ancestor of the Niger–Congo language family

Proto-Niger–Congo
- (hypothetical)
- Reconstruction of: Niger–Congo languages
- Region: Africa
- Era: ca. 9,000–8,000 BCE
- Lower-order reconstructions: Atlantic–Congo; Proto-Mande

Proto-Niger–Congo is the hypothetical reconstructed proto-language of the proposed Niger–Congo language family.

== Validity ==
Unlike Nilo-Saharan, the Niger–Congo language phylum is accepted by mainstream linguists and Africanists. Atlantic–Congo (roughly, Niger–Congo but excluding the Mande, Kru, Siamou, Kordofanian, Dogon and Ijoid languages) is accepted by Glottolog 4.4.

== Origin ==
Blench (2006, 2016) proposes that Proto-Niger–Congo originated about 11,000–10,000 years before present in the western part of the "Green Sahara" of Africa (roughly the Sahel and southern Sahara), and that its dispersal can be correlated with the spread of the bow and arrow by migrating hunter-gatherers.

== Phonology ==
=== Tones ===
Larry Hyman (2016) reconstructs two contrastive level tones for Proto-Niger–Congo, which are:

- *H (high tone)
- *L (low tone)

=== Syllabic structure ===
Proto-Niger–Congo is traditionally assumed to have had a disyllabic root structure similar to that of Proto-Bantu, namely (C)V-CVCV (Williamson 2000, etc.). However, Roger Blench (2016) proposes a trisyllabic (CVCVCV) syllabic structure for Proto-Niger–Congo roots, while Konstantin Pozdniakov (2016) suggests that the main prototypical structure of Proto-Niger–Congo roots is *CVC, along with disyllabic, trisyllabic, and other variations.

== Morphology ==
=== Noun classes ===
Noun classes can be reconstructed for Proto-Atlantic–Congo, and these are sometimes assumed to be Proto-Niger–Congo. Noun class prefixes in Proto-Atlantic–Congo include:

- noun class 1: prefix for human singular
- noun class 2: prefix for human plural
- noun class 6A: prefix for liquid and mass nouns ("uncountables")

Below are some Niger–Congo noun class markers (Good 2020:145, from Schadeberg 1989:72):

Branch	1	1 (semantic category)	3	4	4 (semantic category)	5	6	6 (semantic categories)	6a	6a (semantic category)
Kordofanian	*gu-	humans	*gu-	*j-	‘tree’	*li-	*ŋu-	‘egg’	*ŋ-	liquids
Atlantic	*gu-	humans	*gʊ-	*Ci-	‘trees’	*de-	*ga-	‘head, name’	*ma-	liquids
Oti–Volta (Gur)	*-ʊ	humans	*-bʊ	*-Ci	‘tree’	*-ɖɪ	*-a	‘egg, head’	*-ma	liquids
Ghana–Togo (Kwa)	*o-	humans	*o-	*i-	‘firewood’	*li-	*a-	‘egg, head, name’	*N-	liquids
Benue–Congo	*u-	humans	*u-	*(t)i-	‘tree’	*li-	*a-	‘egg, head, name’	*ma-	liquids
Bantu (noun)	*mu-	humans	*mu-	*mi-	‘tree’	*i̧-	*ma-	‘egg, name’	*ma-	liquids
Bantu (pronoun)	*ju-		*gu-	*gi-		*di-	*ga-		*ga-	

=== Verbal extensions ===
Below are some Proto-Niger/Atlantic–Congo, Proto-Bantu, and Proto-Atlantic verbal extensions (Good 2020:146, from Hyman 2007:157):

Type of suffix	Proto-Niger/Atlantic–Congo	Proto-Bantu	Proto-Atlantic
applicative	*-de	*-ɪd	*-ed
causative	*-ci, *-ti	*-ic-i	*-an
passive	*-o	*-ɪb-ʊ	*-V[+back]
reciprocal	*-na	*-an	*-ad
reversive	*-to	*-ʊd	*-ɪt

For example, in Swahili:

- verb root: penda 'to love'
  - reciprocal: pendana 'to love each other'
  - applicative: pendea 'to love for'
  - causative: pendeza 'to please'

== Pronouns ==
Güldemann's (2018) Proto-Niger–Congo pronoun reconstructions, for the first and second person pronouns (singular and plural), are given below.

	singular	plural
1st person	*mV^{front}	*TV^{close}
2nd person	*mV^{back}	*NV^{close}

Babaev (2013) is a detailed survey of pronouns in Niger–Congo languages, along with detailed reconstructions.

== Numerals ==
Konstantin Pozdniakov (2018) has published a detailed reconstruction of Proto-Niger–Congo numerals, as well as comprehensive reconstructions for the lower-order branches of the Niger–Congo phylum. Pozdniakov (2018: 293) and Güldemann (2018: 147) reconstruct the following numerals for Proto-Niger–Congo.

Numeral	Proto-Niger–Congo (Pozdniakov 2018)	Proto-Niger–Congo (Güldemann 2018)
1	*ku-(n)-di (> ni/-in), *do, *gbo/*kpo	
2	*ba-di	*Ri
3	*tat / *tath	*ta(C)
4	*na(h)i	*na(C)
5	*tan, *nu(n)	*nU
6	5+1	
7	5+2	
8	*na(i)nai (< 4 reduplicated)	
9	5+4	
10	*pu / *fu	
20	< ‘person’	

The numerals 6-9 are formed by combining lower numerals, while ‘20’ is derived from ‘person’.

== Lexicon ==
There is currently no comprehensive, systematic reconstruction for Proto-Niger–Congo lexical roots. Nevertheless, quasi-reconstructions (preliminary, tentative reconstructions, which are marked using the number sign #) have been attempted by Roger Blench, who is currently compiling a Niger–Congo etymological dictionary. Some examples from Blench (2016):

Proto-Niger–Congo	Gloss
*keɗeri	to split, cut, break
*suŋguri	to wash (transitive)
#tokori	chew
*siŋguri	rub, smear
*ɗumigbi	bury, dig, grave, plant
#tɪ́gbʊ́rɪ́	head
#gbukuru	tortoise, turtle
#goŋgboro	chest
#kpagara	leg, foot
#ku(n)duŋo	knee
#-bugbulu	hole
#kVnV	one
*tunuru	five

Hans Günther Mukarovsky's reconstruction of Proto-Western Nigritic (roughly equivalent to Proto-Atlantic–Congo) was published in 2 volumes in 1976 and 1977.

=== Plants ===
Blench (2009) lists various Niger–Congo quasi-reconstructions for plants with important economic uses (note that not all of them necessarily reconstruct to Proto-Niger–Congo). These roots are generally widespread areal forms (Wanderworts), with some of them also found in Afroasiatic and Nilo-Saharan languages. A few forms are also added from some of Blench's other works (2006, 2012, 2016).

Niger–Congo form	Common name	Scientific name(s)	Notes
#-bal-	palm spp.	Raphia sudanica; Elaeis guineensis	
#-kundi-	dryzone palm	Phoenix reclinata; Borassus aethiopum; Raphia sp.	
#-bila-	oil-palm (?)	Elaeis guineensis	
#-eli-	oil-palm	Elaeis guineensis	
#-ten-	oil-palm	Elaeis guineensis	
#(n)gbaŋ-	fan-palm	Borassus aethiopum	
#lona	locust bean tree	Parkia biglobosa	
#-(g)be	cola nut	Cola nitida, Cola acuminata	
#goro	cola nut	Cola nitida, Cola acuminata	
#kum	silk-cotton tree	Ceiba pentandra	
#kom-	African mahogany	Khaya senegalensis	
#ŋ-kpunu	shea tree; ‘oil, fat’	Vitellaria paradoxa	
#-par	African olive, bush-candle	Canarium schweinfurthii	
#kVN-	sorghum, guinea-corn	Sorghum bicolor	
#mar(d)a	pearl millet	Pennisetum glaucum	also widespread in West Chadic
#fundi	fonio	Digitaria exilis	in Mande, Atlantic, Gur, etc.
#ku; #ji	yam	Dioscorea spp.	
#-tom	aerial yam	Dioscorea bulbifera	widespread in Nigeria and western Cameroon
#koko	cocoyam, taro	Colocasia esculenta	
#zo(ko)	cowpea	Vigna unguiculata	in Central Nigeria; Benue-Congo has *kón (Proto-Manenguba) and *-kʊ́ndè (Proto-Bantu)
#-kpa	Bambara groundnut	Vigna subterranea	West Benue-Congo
#-gunu	Bambara groundnut	Vigna subterranea	East Benue-Congo
#-wi	Bambara groundnut	Vigna subterranea	Plateau languages
#-kora	calabash, gourd	Lagenaria siceraria; Cucurbita spp.	
#kom-	enset, banana	Musa spp.	
#konde	plantain	Musa paradisiaca	
#màaló (?)	rice	Oryza glaberrima	Proto-Manding reconstruction; widespread form across West Africa

Other plant names with widespread areal distributions in West Africa:

- Milicia excelsa: odum, iroko (in Ghana and Nigeria)
- Funtumia elastica (bush rubber tree): o-fruntum (in Ghana)
- Sesamum indicum (sesame): #-sVwa (Benue-Congo)
- Abelmoschus esculentus (okra): ɔ́kʊrʊ, ɪkɪabʊ, akɛnɛta (in southern Nigeria)

=== Animals ===
Below are some quasi-reconstructions of Niger–Congo areal forms for animal names given by Blench (2007), with some reconstructions also based on Blench (2006).

Niger–Congo form	Common name	Distribution
#jata	lion	Mande-Congo
#guni	lion	areal form
#-bungu	hyena	Volta-Congo
#-biti	hyena	Proto-Benue-Kwa
#murum	hyena	Central Nigeria
#gbali	elephant	Mande-Congo
#-nyi	elephant	Benue-Kwa ?; also means 'tusk'
#-solu	elephant	Volta-Congo
#-bu	dog	Proto-Niger–Congo
#kuru	crocodile	Niger-Congo (Proto-Bantu has #-gandu)
#budi	goat	Niger-Congo (Afroasiatic and Nilo-Saharan have #k-r-)
#-ga	village weaver	Benue-Congo

=== Pan-African roots ===
Below are some Pan-African lexical roots proposed by Blench (2025). These roots may variously be found in different language phyla, including Niger–Congo, Nilo-Saharan, Afroasiatic, and even Khoisan and language isolates. Blench points to early language contact as a possible explanation for the widespread distribution of these roots. Sound symbolism (a phonaesthetic explanation) is another possible explanation. Blench rejects the similarities as being due to chance resemblances.

Root	Gloss
#ɓwoN-	to come
#keri	to split, cut, break
#kulu	knee
#-duŋ-	knee
#kuru	tortoise, turtle
#kala	crab
#kulu	skin, hide
#morV	fat, oil, grease
#(dw)isi	fire
#-si	dog
#pur-	to fly, jump

== See also ==
- Proto-Bantu language
- Proto-Afroasiatic language
- Haplogroup E-M2
- Ounjougou

== Bibliography ==
- Güldemann, Tom (2011). "Proto-Bantu and Proto-Niger-Congo: Macro-areal Typology and Linguistic Reconstruction". Geographical Typology and Linguistic Areas. Tokyo University of Foreign Studies. Vol. 2. pp. 109–141. doi:10.1075/tufs.2.09gul. ISBN 978-90-272-0769-2. ISSN 1877-6248.
- Sim, Galina (2017). "Towards Proto-Niger–Congo: Comparison and Reconstruction, Paris, LLACAN, September 1–3, 2016". Journal of Language Relationship. 14 (3–4): 207–210. doi:10.31826/jlr-2017-143-408. ISSN 2219-4029.
- Grollemund, Rebecca, Simon Branford, Jean-Marie Hombert & Mark Pagel. 2016. Genetic unity of the Niger-Congo family. Paper presented for the 2nd International Congress "Towards Proto-Niger-Congo: Comparison and Reconstruction", Paris, 1-3 September, 2016.
