= Amira language =

Niger–Congo language spoken in Sudan

Amira
- Jebel El Amira
- Native to: Sudan
- Region: Nuba Hills
- Ethnicity: Lafofa
- Native speakers: (5,100 all Lalofa cited 1984)
- Language family: Niger–Congo?: Atlantic–Congo; Lafofa; Amira

Language codes
- ISO 639-3: (included in Lafofa [laf])
- Glottolog: jebe1248

Amira, also Jebel el Amira, is a Niger–Congo language spoken in South Kordofan, Sudan. It is sometimes considered a dialect of Lafofa, which is poorly attested.

== Sources ==
- Roger Blench, 2011 (ms), "Does Kordofanian constitute a group and if not, where does its languages fit into Niger-Congo?"
