= Kordofanian =

Kordofanian may refer to:

- Something of, from, or related to the former Sudanese province of Kordofan
- Something of, from, or related to the current Sudanese states of North Kordofan, South Kordofan, or West Kordofan
- Kordofanian languages
