= Tingal people =

Ethnic group in Sudan

Tingal laso known as Kajaja is an ethnic group in Sudan. They speak Tingal, a Niger–Congo language. They numbered around 8,000 in 1982.
