= Schadeberg =

Schadeberg is a surname. Notable people with the surname include:

- Henry C. Schadeberg (1913–1985), American politician
- Jürgen Schadeberg (1931–2020), German-born South African photographer and artist
- Thilo C. Schadeberg (born 1942), Emeritus Professor of Bantu Linguistics
