= Tima language =

Language in the Katla language family

Tima
- Lomorik, Tamanik, Yibwa
- Di-murik
- Native to: Sudan
- Region: Nuba Hills, Southern Kordofan
- Ethnicity: 5,000 Tima (2007)
- Native speakers: (3,300 cited 2000)
- Language family: Niger–Congo?: Kordofanian; Katla languages; Tima
- Writing system: Unwritten

Language codes
- ISO 639-3: tms
- Glottolog: tima1241
- ELP: Tima
- Tima is classified as Severely Endangered by the UNESCO Atlas of the World's Languages in Danger.

Tima is one of the two languages in the Katla language family. It is spoken by the Tima people in Central Sudan.

== Language name ==
The name of the language originates from one of the village's names in which Tima is spoken: tɨmmʌ. It is often used by people who live near to but are not part of the Tima-community and in linguistic contexts. From what is known about this name, there is no negative connotation to it.

While the name 'Tima' is often used, the native speakers refer to Tima as 'du-murik'.

Other names used for this language are Lomorik, Tamanik and Yibwa.

== Native speakers ==
Tima is spoken mainly in a few villages in Central Sudan, in an area somewhere between the towns Katla and Lagawa, around the Jebel Hill in the Nuba Mountains. This area is said to have the most native speakers with around four-fifth of all Tima-speakers, though it is difficult to say if this given location is still completely accurate to this day. Native speakers call their living area 'lu-murik' and themselves 'i-murik' in plural form or 'ko-murik' in singular form.

== Word structure ==
Tima words are composed of multiple affixes. Noun-prefixes are used as an indicator of the according noun-classes and the quantity of the noun.

There is also a high number of suffixes which for example act as certain verb extensions.

== Locative nouns ==
Locative nouns (that are only used in singular forms here) use the Prefix 'li-'. This prefix indicates a location and is used for locative nouns as well as for names of places.

- 'lɔɔ' =at home
- 'liidi' =place of water
- 'lu-murik' =Tima area/village
- 'lɘ-madaŋ' =Katla area/village
- 'l-almania' =in Germany

As seen above, there are two different allomorphs possible for the prefix. The 'li-' prefix is the base form and the 'I-' is second form.

The base form only attaches to nominal roots that start with a consonant.

The second form is only attached to nominal roots that start with a vowel. Here the prefix vowel '-i-' disappears before the prefix is attached to the nominal root.

To indicate a location 'li-' can also attach to prepositions.

With the same purpose 'li-' can also attach to the third person singular and plural. It is known, that in spoken Tima this results in the expression: 'l(i)-yʌŋ' which means 'there is/are'.

There is also the proclitic locative marker 'ɪ-/i', which is used for another set of locative nouns. It is used for singular and plural nouns and is found in different types of Tima noun classes and stands before the singular or plural prefixes in the word structure. It considered to be a major locative marker.

singular	plural	
'i-kuh'	'i- yuh'	=in the bone/s
'ɪ-dɘla'	'ɪ-ɪdɘla'	=on the roofs

Another irregularity are locative markers with body part nouns. The locative marker 'i-' still exists, but additionally their numeral class prefix changes. The usual singular class prefix is replaced by the morpheme 'yV' and the usual plural prefix is replaced by the marker 'i-'.

This rules has several exceptions for example, nouns from the noun class 'c-' use the locative marker but keep their singular class prefix. But in plural they use the locative marker and change the plural marker from 'i-' to 'y-' to avoid using this vowel so often in a row.

singular	plural	
'ɪ-c-ɪɪ'	'ɪ-y-ɪɪ'	=in the eye/s

Other exceptions are body part nouns that belong to the 'ku-' singular class, some don't undergo any changes and others drop the locativ prefix 'i-' entirely.

To express the meaning of a location, the locative marker '(n)tV-' is used. In this case the marker differs depending on where the speaker is with regard to the location mentioned. Witch the use of this locative marker these nouns can undergo some morphonological changes.

== Tense ==
Tima tenses fundamentally consists off of a non-future tense and a future tense. That is because Tima speakers mostly distinguish events by whether they already took place or if they will take place after the moment of speech.

=== Future tense ===
Grammatically, the future tense has to be marked with a 'dV-' morpheme. The 'V' in this case stands for an underspecified vowel, which changes depending on the individual subject marker of the verb.

Furthermore, Tima distinguishes between definite future (recent future) and indefinite future (remote future). You can tell which one of the two is used, by looking at which subject person marker is used, which is located in the verb structure right before the future tense marker.

==== Indefinite future tense ====
The indefinite future is used, when you want to say that an action will take place, but you do not know when yet. Grammatically this tense is marked with the usual future tense morpheme 'dV-' plus an aspect marker 'cV-'.

	Tima	Translation
1SG	cɛ-n-dɛ-n- n-mɔɔk-dʌ iidi	I will drink water
2SG	ca-da- mɔɔk-ŋaŋ iidi	you will drink water
3SG	pɨnʌ cɘ-n-dɘ-n-məok iidi	he/she will drink water
1PL.INCL	cɛ-di-mɔɔk-neey iidi	we will drink water
1PL.EXCL	cɛ-di-mɔɔk -nin iidi	we will drink water
2PL	ca-da-na-mɔɔk-nan iidi	you will drink water
3PL	ihinʌ cɘ-n-dɘ-n- mɔɔk iidi	they will drink water

When expressing something for the indefinite future, another combination of markers that is used are the imperfective aspect marker 'e-' plus the future marker 'dV-'. This first marker is only used for the indefinite future tense.

1SG 'e-dɛ-n-diik-dʌ' =I will go

To emphasise the fact that indefinite future is in use, it is not unusual that adverbials are added.

E.g. 'anako' =later on/in the future

==== Definite future tense ====
The definite future is used, when said action will definitely take place shortly after the time of speech.

The usual future marker 'dV-' is used on the verb here, but unlike for the indefinite future, the imperfect aspect marker 'c-' is not used.

It is also possible to use the present tense when speaking of an action that will take place in the definite future. The context of the statement is very important in this case because it will explain that the definite future is meant, even if the present tense is used. In this case the future tense morpheme is no longer used. In order to highlight the habitual aspect, the adverb 'ʈɔʈɔk' can be added.

To emphasise the fact that definite future is in use, it is not unusual that adverbials are added.

E.g.

'batɪn' = coming next
'kʊhʊnaŋ' = now/just

There are also more variants of the definite future if it is used together with a specific mood category.

=== Non-future tense ===
This tense is generally used for all situations which are not in the future, i.e. events that took place in the past, general events or ongoing events.

If you compare future and non-future verbs, there is no explicit marker for the non-future tense where the future marker 'dV-' would be, but instead there are subject markers to use on verbs, which differ for each non-future tense.

==== Past tense ====
As said above, the Past tense is morphologically unmarked and can only be distinguished from other tenses by the subject marker. There is a proclitic marker though, which fuses with the person marker in the verb, which indicates the past tense:

SG 'a-'
PL 'i-'

This results in a morpheme which holds information both about the tense and the subject.

There is a differentiation between Recent Past and Remote Past, which will be elaborated below.

===== Recent past =====
The Recent Past is a tense, used if said past event still somehow connects to the present time. To mark this tense, the past proclitic markers 'a-' (sg.) and 'i-' (pl.) are fused with a certain subject marker. The past marker hereby proceeds the person marker:

	separate morphemes	portmanteau morpheme
1SG	a+iŋ	ɛŋ
2SG	a+a	aa
3SG	a+ŋ	aŋ
1PL.INCL	a+i	ɛɛ
1PL.EXCL	a+i	ɛɛ
2PL	a i	ɛ
3PL	a ŋ	aŋ

Which results in sentences like this, e.g.:

2SG 'aa-kumun-ŋaŋ' =you found it

To emphasize the connection between past and present time in this tense, either adverbs are frequently used or a certain aspect marker '-ataŋ' is added at the end of the verb-root.

===== Remote past =====
The Remote Past or General past describes an action that took place a long time ago from the moment of speech. As in the recent past, the past tense proclitic marker is also fused with a subject marker but with a different one than for the recent past.

Depending on the sentence structure, the 1sg subject proclitic marker either is 'uŋ-' (SVO) or 'iŋ-' (OSV).

Other irregularities exist in combination with the ergative case. Here the person marker 'nʌ' is used, but can change depending on the verb and its consonant at the beginning of the verb root.

==== Present tense ====
This tense is used for describing an action that is happening during the moment of speech, i.e. for describing something progressive or habitual.

The progressive 'cV-' marker is used here, but its form is dependent on the subject markers of each verb. This results in sentence being both interpretable as progressive or habitual.

For describing a procedure or express a generic sentence, the progressive marker falls away completely and only subject marker and verb-root are being used.

== Numerals ==
The counting system in Tima language works with two different bound prefixes.

An exception to this system is the number 1. It is marked by the prefix 'a-/ʌ-'.

For the numbers 2 to 10 the prefix 'ɪ-/i-' is used and it marks the singularity of those numbers.

The following numbers from 11 to 19 have there names from a combination of the names from the numbers 1 to 9 plus the prefix 't̪a-'. This most likely works as an indication that the number is „from 10 onward“ or just works as a „plus“.

base numeral		+10		× 10	
1	a-tɪɪn	11	ta-tɪɪn	10	ɪ-hɪdakʊn
2	ɪ-hɪɪk	12	ta-hɪɪk	20	i-hʌdʌkun ɪhɪɪk
3	ɪ-hwaay	13	ta-hwaay	30	i-hʌdʌkun ɪhwaay
4	ɪ-halɘm	14	ta-halɘm	40	i-hʌdʌkun ɪhalɘm
5	i-duliin	15	ta-duliin	50	i-hʌdʌku idulii
6	ɪ-nt̪ɘdakwalɔɔŋ	16	ta-nt̪ɘdakwalɔɔŋ	60	i-hʌdʌku int̪ɘdakwalɔɔ
7	ɪ-ntatɪŋɛɛl	17	ta-ntatɪŋɛɛl	70	i-hʌdʌku intatɪŋɛɛ
8	ɪ-nt̪ɪŋɛrɛɛy	18	ta-nt̪ɪŋɛrɛɛy	80	i-hʌdʌku int̪ɪŋɛrɛɛ
9	ɪ-nt̪ahʌdʌkun	19	ta-nt̪ahʌdʌkun	90	i-hʌdʌku int̪ahʌdʌku
10	ɪ-hɪdakʊn	20	i-hʌdʌkun ɪhɪɪk	100	i-hʌdʌku ihʌdʌku
