= Tegem language =

Niger–Congo language of Kordofan, Sudan

Tegem
- Jebel Tekeim
- Region: Nuba Hills, Sudan
- Ethnicity: Lafofa
- Native speakers: (5,100 all Lalofa cited 1984)
- Language family: Niger–Congo?: Atlantic–Congo; Lafofa; Tegem

Language codes
- ISO 639-3: (included in Lafofa [laf])
- Glottolog: jebe1249

Tegem, also Jebel Tekeim, is a Niger–Congo language spoken in Kordofan, Sudan. It is sometimes considered a dialect of Lafofa, which is poorly attested.

== Phonology ==
=== Consonants ===
		Labial	Dental	Alveolar		Retroflex	Palatal	Velar	Glottal
Plosive	voiceless	p	t̪			ʈ	c	k	
Plosive	voiced	b	d̪				ɟ	ɡ	
Plosive	prenasal	ᵐb	ⁿd̪			ᶯɖ	ᶮɟ	ᵑɡ	
Nasal		m		n			ɲ	ŋ	
Rhotic				r		ɽ			
Sonorant		w		l	ɫ		j		h

- Labialization [ʷ] is also said to occur among sounds.
- The following sounds can occur as geminated, [bː, mː, t̪ː, d̪ː, rː, lː, ɫː, ʈː, cː, ɟː, kː].

=== Vowels ===
	Front	Central	Back	
Close	i		u	
Close	ɪ		ʊ	
Close-mid	e		o	
Open-mid	ɛ		ʌ	ɔ
Open	æ	a	ɑ	

- Vowel length is also distinctive.

== Sources ==
- Roger Blench, 2011 (ms), "Does Kordofanian constitute a group and if not, where does its languages fit into Niger-Congo?"
