= Gulud people =

Total population
- 14,208 (In 1984)

Languages
- Sudanese Arabic, Katla

Gulud, also known as Katla, is an ethnic group in the Nuba Hills in Sudan. They speak Katla, a Kordofanian language, and live in the Katla hills, which are around 60 kilometres (37 mi) from Kadugli.
