= Thilo C. Schadeberg =

German linguist

- Born: 1942 (age 83–84); Dresden, Germany
- Occupation: Linguist

Academic background
- Education: University of Marburg (Ph.D., 1971)

Academic work
- Institutions: Leiden University
- Main interests: Bantu languages and Kordofanian languages

Thilo Christian Schadeberg (born 1942 in Dresden, Germany) is an emeritus professor of Bantu Linguistics at the Centre for Linguistics of Leiden University.

== Education and research ==
Schadeberg obtained his PhD at the University of Marburg in 1971 and was a professor of African Languages and Cultures at Leiden since 1986. His research focuses on Bantu languages of East Africa and Angola, and Kordofanian languages of Sudan.

== Editor ==
Schadeberg was the sole editor of the Journal of African Languages and Linguistics (JALL) from 1983 to 1989. Previously, he had been associate editor of JALL since its foundation by Paul Newman in 1979.

== Honors and awards ==
Schadeberg is a member of the Royal Netherlands Academy of Arts and Sciences (KNAW) since 1989. He was a visiting professor at the University of Bayreuth from 2004 to 2007.

== Selected publications ==
Schadeberg published many scholarly articles and book chapters, including:

- Zur Lautstruktur des Kinga (Tanzania), Thesis, E. Symon, Marburg, 1971. In German.
- The classification of the Kadugli language group, in Nilo-Saharan, in Lionel Bender and Thilo C. Schadeberg, Eds., Nilo-Saharan Proceedings. Proceedings of the First Nilo-Saharan Linguistics Conference, Leiden, The Netherlands, September 8–10, 1980, 291–305.
- Nasalization in Umbundu, Journal of African languages and linguistics 4 (1982) 109–132.
- Les suffixes verbaux séparatifs en bantou, Sprache und Geschichte in Afrika (SUGIA) 4 (1982) 55–66. In French.
- Tone cases in Umbundu, Koninklijk Museum voor Midden-Afrika, 1986, 425–447.
- Kordofanian, The Niger-Congo languages 1989, 66–80.
- with Ridder Samsom, Kiinimacho cha mahali: Kiambishi tamati cha mahali-ni, Afrikanistische Arbeitspapiere (AAP) 37 (1994) 127–138. In Kiswahili.
- Spirantization and the 7-to-5 Vowel Merger in Bantu, Belgian Journal of Linguistics 9 (1994) 73 - 84.
- Object diagnostics in Bantu, in Emenanjo N. and Ndimele O.-m., Eds., Issues in African languages and linguistics. Essays in honour of Kay Williamson, 173 - 180, 1995.
- Progress in Bantu lexical reconstruction, Journal of African Languages and Linguistics 23 (2002) 183–195.
- Chapter 5. Derivation, in Nurse, D. and Philippson, G., Eds., The Bantu Languages, Routledge Language Family Series, Routledge, London 2003. ISBN 9780700711345.

== See also ==
- Kadu languages
