= Konstantin Pozdniakov =

Russian-French linguist (born 1952)

- Константин Поздняков
- Born: 24 July 1952 (age 74)

Academic background
- Education: Leningrad State University

Academic work
- Institutions: CNRS
- Main interests: Historical linguistics; Niger-Congo languages; Mande languages; Atlantic languages; Rongorongo

Konstantin Igorevich Pozdniakov (Russian: Константин Игоревич Поздняков; born 24 July 1952, Leningrad, USSR) is a Russian-French linguist who works on the comparative-historical linguistics of the Mande, Atlantic, and Niger-Congo families. He also works on Rongorongo of Easter Island.

== Education ==
In 1974, Pozdniakov graduated from the West African Languages Department (in the Department of African Studies, Oriental Department) of Leningrad State University. In 1978, he defended his thesis at the Institute of Linguistics of the Academy of Sciences of the USSR (Moscow) on the comparative study of Mande languages.

== Career ==
From 1978-1982 he worked at the Soviet cultural mission in Dakar, Senegal. From 1982–1997, he was a researcher at the Museum of Anthropology and Ethnography of the Academy of Sciences of the USSR / RAS (Kunstkamera) in Leningrad / St. Petersburg. In 1995, he defended his doctoral dissertation on the reconstruction of the grammar of Atlantic languages.

Since 1997, he has been a professor at the Institut national des langues et civilisations orientales (INALCO) in Paris and a researcher at the LLACAN (Languages and cultures of Africa) research unit of the French National Center for Scientific Research (CNRS). From 2011–2016, he was a senior member of the Institut Universitaire de France.

== Research interests and main publications ==
- reconstruction of the vocabulary and grammar of the Atlantic languages, and etymological dictionary of the Atlantic languages (with Guillaume Segerer)

Pozdniakov, Konstantin 1993. Сравнительная грамматика атлантических языков: именные классы и элементы фоно-морфологии. [Comparative grammar of the Atlantic languages]. Moscow: Nauka (in Russian).

Pozdniakov, Konstantin. 2015. Diachronie des classes nominales atlantiques: morphophonologie, morphologie, sémantique. In: (Ed.) Denis Creissels et Konstantin Pozdniakov. Les classes nominales dans les langues atlantiques. Köln, Rüdiger Köppe Verlag: 54-102.

Pozdniakov, Konstantin. 2022. Proto-Fula–Sereer: Lexicon, morphophonology, and noun classes. (Niger-Congo Comparative Studies 3). Berlin: Language Science Press. DOI: 10.5281/zenodo.5820515 https://langsci-press.org/catalog/book/325

Pozdniakov, Konstantin & Guillaume Segerer. 2024. "A Genealogical classification of Atlantic languages." In: Lüpke, Friederike (ed.) The Oxford Guide to the Atlantic Languages of West Africa: Oxford: Oxford University Press : 16-47.

- Proto-Niger-Congo reconstruction, including noun classes and numerals

Pozdniakov, Konstantin. 2018. The numeral system of Proto-Niger-Congo: A step-by-step reconstruction. (Niger-Congo Comparative Studies 2). Berlin: Language Science Press. DOI: 10.5281/zenodo.1311704 https://langsci-press.org/catalog/book/191

Pozdniakov, Konstantin. 2023. Anomalies in the noun class systems of Niger-Congo: towards a typology of the atypical // Language in Africa, 4, 1: 86-99. https://iling-ran.ru/web/ru/publications/journals/languageinafrica/4-1

Pozdniakov, Konstantin & Valentin Vydrin. 2026. Mande and Bantu in the Niger-Congo context // Language in Africa, 7 (1), https://iling-ran.ru/web/en/node/4416

- quantitative comparative linguistics and theoretical approaches to comparative linguistics

Pozdniakov, Konstantin. 2016. Statistics and reconstruction: «quantitative diachrony». .In: (Ed.) Konstantin Pozdniakov. Reconstruction et classification généalogique: tendances actuelles. Faits de Langues, Paris: 223-250.

Pozdniakov, Konstantin & Guillaume Segerer. 2019. Regular homophones: a tool for semantic typology and for linguistic reconstruction // Africana Linguistica 25: 231-279

- morphology

Pozdniakov, Konstantin. 2003. Micromorphologie ou morphologie de paradigme? // Bulletin de la Société de linguistique de Paris, 1, vol. XCVIII: 3-52. PDF

- phonotactics

Pozdniakov, Konstantin & Guillaume Segerer. 2007. Similar Place Avoidance: A Statistical Universal // Linguistic Typology. Vol. 11(2): 307-348. PDF

- decipherment of Rongorongo (Easter Island)

Pozdniakov, Konstantin. 1996. Les bases du déchiffrement de l'écritures de l'île de Pâque // Journal de la Societé des Océanistes, 103, Paris, , p. 289-303.

Pozdniakov, Konstantin & Igor Pozdniakov. 2007. Rapanui Writing and the Rapanui Language: Preliminary Results of a Statistical Analysis. In: Forum for Anthropology and Culture . St. Petersburg: University of Oxford; Peter the Great Museum of Anthropology and Ethnography, Russian Academy of Sciences; European University: 3-36. PDF
