= Tegel (disambiguation) =

Tegel is a locality in Berlin, Germany.

Tegel may also refer to:

- Berlin Tegel Airport, in Berlin, Germany
- Lake Tegel, in Berlin, Germany
- Tegel Foods, New Zealand poultry company
- Peter Tegel, British translator
- Jöran Persson Tegel, 16th-century Swedish politician
- Tegel, a fictional character in the video game Tegel's Mercenaries

== See also ==
- Tegal (disambiguation)
