= Taqali =

Former African country

Kingdom of Taqali
- 1750–1969
- Capital: Abbasiyya Keraia (Pre 1929)
- Common languages: Tegali
- Makk of Taqali
- History
  - Decline of the Kingdom of Sennar: 1750
  - Taqali conquered by Sudanese Mahdists: 1884
  - British defeat the Mahdists and incorporate Taqali into Anglo-Egyptian Sudan: 1889
  - Creation of the Republic of Sudan: 1969

Taqali (also spelled Tegali from the Tagale people) was a state of Nuba peoples that existed in the Nuba Mountains, in modern-day central Sudan. It is believed to have been founded in the eighteenth century, though oral traditions suggest it was established two centuries earlier. Due in part to its geographic position on a plateau surrounded by desert, Taqali was able to maintain its independence for some 130 years despite the presence of hostile neighbors. It was conquered by Sudanese Mahdists in 1884 and restored as a British client state in 1889. Its administrative power ended with the 1969 Sudanese coup, though the Makk of Taqali, its traditional leader, retains ceremonial power in the region.

== History ==
=== Early history ===
The Taqali state was centered upon the Taqali Massif, the highest part of the Nuba Hills in the Kordofan region (of what is now central Sudan). Its early history is unclear. Oral traditions state that it was founded in the early sixteenth century when the Kingdom of Sennar was established. However, some scholars believe the state did not exist until the late eighteenth century (between 1750 and 1780) and that the early rulers (noted on the list of monarchs) are semi-mythological.

=== Independent state ===
Historian Janet J. Ewald argued that the first true ruler of Taqali was Muhammad Wad Jayli. Ewald proposed that Wad Jayli, along with his son, Ismail of Qaqali, founded the state. Ewald contends the state of Taqali was formed during a period of disorder in the Kordofan when the Kingdom of Sennar was in decline and Darfur was growing in power. Muhammad Wad Jayli began uniting the region and was succeeded as Makk by his brother Umar. Umar was overthrown c. 1783 by Ajaid, the queen mother, and Muhammad's son, Ismail. The state was further expanded by Ismail who took control of the "99 hills" of the region. His son Abakr peacefully succeeded him in 1800.

Despite its relatively small size and powerful neighbors, the Taqali state remained independent. The state was centered on the Taqali Massif and spread to encompassed all of the Nuba Mountains. These highlands were well-suited to agriculture while the surrounding Kordofan plain was dry and inhospitable, which made it difficult to support an invading army. The rocky terrain also served as a natural fortification. The neighboring Kingdom of Sennar posed the greatest threat and was appeased by annual payments from Taqali. Sennar adhered to this arrangement until the Egyptian invasion of Sennar in 1821. The Egyptians then launched three failed invasions against Taqali. An agreement was reached with Egypt that Taqali would remain de facto independent but would pay a nominal tax and be officially incorporated into Egyptian Sudan. Egypt and other outside powers attempted to influence the leadership of Taqali, which was plagued by succession conflicts from 1840 to 1880.

In 1883 the Mahdist Sudanese (who were in the midst of the Mahdist War with Egypt) decided to invade Taqali. Their campaign advanced further than any previous attempt. In July 1884 the ruler of Taqali, Makk Adam, was captured by the Mahdists and eventually died in captivity. Insurrections continued in Taqali, and Hamdan Abu Anja, a nearby Sudanese ruler, was dispatched to quell the rebellion. This resulted in more pillaging and destruction in Taqali. The state was then conquered by the forces of the self-proclaimed Mahdi, Muhammad Ahmad, in the late 19th century. In conjunction with other campaigns and revolts in Egyptian Sudan, this resulted in the formation of Mahdist State.

=== Restoration ===
In 1889 the Mahdists were defeated by the British, who formed Anglo-Egyptian Sudan. The Makk of Taqali was restored to power but remained closely controlled by the British. The Makks of Taqali proved to be useful allies and the British gradually gave them more territory to control and administer. This continued through to the independence of Sudan in 1956. The administrative power of the state ended with the 1969 coup. Though having no political power, the Makk of Taqali remains a ceremonial leader to the people of the region.

== Royal family ==
The title of the ruler of Taqali was Makk (or Mek, "king"), possibly Arabic but more likely an Arabized word of Merotici or, Ge'ez origin. The tributaries of the Makk of Taqali were known as mukūk al-ʿāda (sing. make al-ʿāda), "customary kings". In Taqali, the son of a makk was a wad al-makk (pl. awlād al-makk), and the son of a daughter of the makk was an arbāb (pl. arābīb). The arābīb were usually prominent councils of the makk, while the arābīb al-thamāniyya (eight arābīb) were a special council that met in the palace. An arbāb could sometimes pass his rank to his sons. Likewise, the title of wad was sometimes bestowed on trusted slaves or servants. All awlād were eligible to be elected as makk. A wad who was given a territory from which to draw revenue was an ahl al-ṭāqīyah, one who wore the ṭāqīyah, a headdress associated with the rule.

A woman who bore a son to the makk was known as an artiyya (pl. artiyyāt), a term not of Arabic origin. They attained the highest rank among the women of the royal household, each supervising her household of surriyyat (concubines) and khaddama (maidservants).

== Mukūk of Taqali ==
The following is a list of the sovereigns of Taqali and the period of their reigns. Note that those before Muhammad wad Jali are disputed.

- Muhammad al-Rubatabi
- Jayli Abu Jarida
- Sabo of Taqali
- Jayli Umara
- Jayli Awan Allah
- Jayli Abu Quran
- Muhammad wad Jayli r. c. 1750
- Umar I –1783
- Ismail I 1783–1800
- Abakr I 1800–820
- Umar II 1820–1835
- Ahmad 1835–1840
- Maryud 1840–1843
- Nasir 1843–c. 1860
- Adam I c. 1860–1884
- Interregnum 1884–1898
- Jayli, 1898–1916
- Abakr II 1916–1920
- Adam II 1920– to an unknown date; one source claimed he was still ruling in 1990.

== Bibliography ==
- Elles, R. J. (1935). "The Kingdom of Tegali". Sudan Notes and Records. 18 (1): 1–35. ISSN 0375-2984. JSTOR 41716095.
- Ali, Osman Mohamed Osman (2016-10-21). "Conflict with Others at a Bleeding Frontier: The Case of Tagoi in the Northeastern Nuba Mountains – Sudan". Égypte/Monde arabe. 14 (14): 113–136. doi:10.4000/ema.3634. ISSN 1110-5097.
