= Lafofa people =

Lafofa is an ethnic group among the Nuba people of Sudan. It likely numbers less than 10,000 persons. This minority is Muslim. Many of them speak Arabic. The traditional language is Lafofa, a Niger–Congo language. They live in South Kurdufan.

== Books ==
- Leif O. Manger: From the Mountains to the Plains. The Integration of the Lafofa Nuba into Sudanese Society. The Scandinavian Institute of African Studies, Uppsala 1994. Summary: Leif Ole Manger: Religion, Identities, and Politics: Defining Muslim Discourses in the Nuba Mountains of the Sudan. 1995
