= Lafofa languages =

Dialect cluster of the Nuba Mountains in Sudan

Lafofa
- Kidie Lafofa
- Native to: Sudan
- Region: Nuba Hills
- Ethnicity: Lafofa
- Native speakers: 30,000 (2023)
- Language family: Niger–Congo?: Kordofanian?; Talodi?; Lafofa
- Dialects: Tegem; Amira

Language codes
- ISO 639-3: laf
- Glottolog: lafo1243
- ELP: Lafofa
- Lafofa is classified as Severely Endangered by the UNESCO Atlas of the World's Languages in Danger.

Lafofa, also Tegem–Amira, is a dialect cluster spoken in the southern Nuba Mountains in the south of Sudan. Blench (2010) considers the Tegem and Amira varieties to be distinct languages; as Lafofa is poorly attested, there may be others.

Greenberg (1950) classified Lafofa as one of the Talodi languages, albeit a divergent one, but without much evidence. More recently this position has been abandoned, and Lafofa is left unclassified within Niger–Congo. Norton (2016) tentatively finds Lafofa to be closest to the Ijoid languages. It is considered a language isolate by Glottolog.

Unlike the neighbouring Talodi–Heiban languages which have SVO word order, the Lafofa languages have SOV word order.

== See also ==
- Lafofa word lists (Wiktionary)
