= Tegali language =

Rashad language spoken in Sudan

Tegali
- Tagale, Tegele, Tekele, Togole
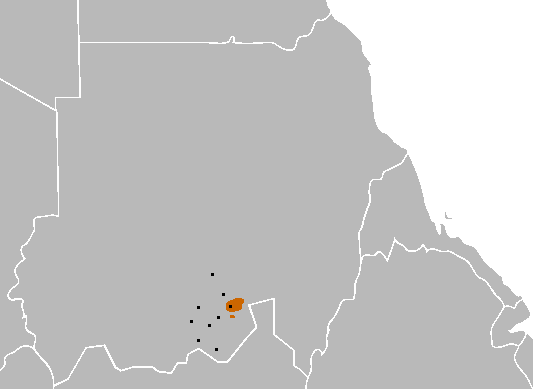
- Native to: Sudan
- Region: South Kordofan
- Ethnicity: Tagale
- Native speakers: 110,000 (2022)
- Language family: Niger–Congo?: Rashad; Tegali
- Dialects: Gom; Tegali; Tingal

Language codes
- ISO 639-3: ras
- Glottolog: tega1236 Tegali
- ELP: Tegali

Tegali (also spelled Tagale, Tegele, Tekele, Togole) is a Kordofanian language in the Rashad family, which is thought by some to belong to the hypothetical Niger–Congo phylum (Greenberg 1963, Schadeberg 1981, Williamson & Blench 2000). It is spoken in South Kordofan state, Sudan.

== Classification ==
The Rashad family of language consists of two dialect clusters, Tegali and Tagoi, which share about 70% basic vocabulary on the 100-word Swadesh list. They are spoken on two mountain ranges to the north and north-west of Rashad. These languages are spoken in the Tegali Hills in the north-east of the Nuba Mountains, the home of the former "Tegali Kingdom". The most conspicuous difference between the two dialect clusters is that Tagoi has a complex system of noun classes while Tegali does not. Different explanations exist for why Tegali dialects lack a noun class system. Greenberg (1963) excludes the possibility of mass borrowing of basic vocabulary in Tagoi and assumes the loss of noun classes in the Tegali dialects.

== Dialects/varieties ==
Tegali has three varieties, Rashad (Gom, Kom, Kome, Ngakom), Tegali, and Tingal (Kajaja, Kajakja). Ethnologue states that Rashed and Tegali dialects are nearly identical. Tucker and Bryan list Rashad as almost identical to Tegali, "perhaps a mere variation of one language"; however, Greenberg lists it as a separate language. Welmers suggests Tingal as a dialect of Tegali; Tucker and Bryan report this as different from Tegali and Rashad, but as definitely belonging to the Tegali branch.

== Geographic distribution ==
There are 108,000 native speakers of Tegali in South Kordofan state, Sudan. Speakers are distributed in the hills between the Rashud-Rashad and Rashad-Umm Ruwaba roads, with a few outlying hills west of Rashad (including Tagoi and Tarjok) and scattered hills south of Rashad.

=== Dialects/varieties distribution ===
Among the three dialects, Tegali has about 88,000 speakers located on the Tegali range. Rashad has about 20,000 speakers in the Rashad hills in the southern part of the Tegali range, also in Rashad town. Tingal (Kajakja) has about 2,100 speakers.

== Phonology ==
=== Consonants ===
| | | Labial | Alveolar | Post-alv./ Palatal | Velar | Glottal |
|---|---|---|---|---|---|---|
| Nasal | | m | n | ɲ | ŋ | |
| Plosive | voiceless | p | t | c | k | |
| Plosive | voiced | b | d | ɟ | ɡ | |
| Plosive | prenasal | ᵐb | ⁿd | | ᵑɡ | |
| Fricative | | f | s | ʃ | | (h) |
| Lateral | | | l | | | |
| Rhotic | | | r | ɽ | | |
| Approximant | | w | | j | | |

- /ɽ/ corresponds to [r] commonly heard in Tagoi
- A retroflex plosive /ɖ/ is heard in the Tagom dialect.
- /s/ and /h/ vary between dialects.

=== Vowels ===
| | Front | Central | Back |
|---|---|---|---|
| Close | i | | u |
| Near-close | ɪ | | ʊ |
| Close-mid | e | ə | o |
| Open-mid | ɛ | ə | ɔ |
| Open | | a | |

- Sounds [ɨ, ʌ] are also heard in the Tagom dialect.

== Examples ==
=== Numeral system ===
Tegali has a counting system similar to that of Tagoi. But now they seemed have developed a more complete numeral system. There is an option for the number 20 'fəŋəndən rəkkʊ'.
