= Katloid languages =

Language group of Sudan

Katloid
- Katla-Tima
- Geographic distribution: Nuba Hills, Sudan
- Linguistic classification: Niger–Congo?: Katla–Rashad; Katloid
- Subdivisions: Katla; Tima

Language codes
- Glottolog: katl1246

The Katla languages are two to three closely related languages that form a small language family in the Nuba Hills of Sudan. Part of an erstwhile Kordofanian proposal, they are of uncertain position within the hypothetical Niger–Congo family. They do not share the characteristic morphology of Niger–Congo, such as the noun-class system. Thus Roger Blench classifies them as a divergent branch of Niger–Congo outside the Atlantic–Congo core. A similar situation holds for another Kordofanian family, Rashad; these are not closely related to Katla.

- Katla
  - Kaalak (Katla)
  - Domorik (Lomorik, Tima)

== See also ==
- List of Proto-Katloid reconstructions (Wiktionary)
