= Kordofanian languages =

Geographic grouping of five language groups spoken in parts of Sudan

Kordofanian
- (geographic)
- Geographic distribution: Nuba Mountains of Sudan
- Ethnicity: Nuba
- Native speakers: 250,000–500,000
- Linguistic classification: Niger–Congo?: Kordofanian
- Subdivisions: Kadu (in Nilo-Saharan); Katla–Rashad (outer Niger–Congo); Talodi–Heiban (Niger–Congo?)

Language codes
- ISO 639-5: kdo
- Glottolog: None
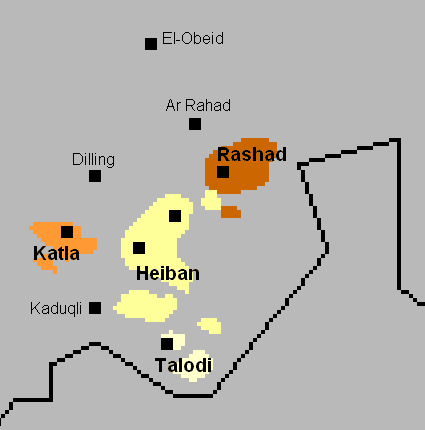

The Kordofanian languages are a geographic grouping of five language groups spoken in the Nuba Mountains of the South Kordofan region of Sudan: Talodi–Heiban languages, Lafofa languages, Rashad languages, Katla languages and Kadu languages. The first four groups are sometimes regarded as branches of the hypothetical Niger–Congo family, whereas Kadu is now widely seen as a branch of the proposed Nilo-Saharan family. The Kordofanian languages may be the oldest group of languages in the region.

== History ==
In 1963, Joseph Greenberg added them to the Niger–Congo family, creating his Niger–Kordofanian proposal. The Kordofanian languages have not been shown to be more distantly related than other branches of Niger–Congo, however, and they have not been shown to constitute a valid group. Today, the Kadu languages are excluded, and the others are usually included in Niger–Congo proper.

Roger Blench notes that the Talodi and Heiban families have the noun class systems characteristic of the Atlantic–Congo core of Niger–Congo but that the two Katla languages have no trace of ever having had such a system. However, the Kadu languages and some of the Rashad languages appear to have acquired noun classes as part of a Sprachbund rather than having inherited them. Blench concludes that Talodi and Heiban are core Niger–Congo whereas Katla and Rashad form a peripheral branch along the lines of Mande.

Clickable map of the language families, subfamilies, and languages spoken in the Nuba Mountains. Kordofanian includes Kadu and all of the Niger–Congo branches.

== Talodi–Heiban languages ==
The Heiban languages, also called Koalib or Koalib–Moro, and the Talodi languages, also called Talodi–Masakin, are part of the Talodi–Heiban group.

== Lafofa languages ==
Lafofa (Tegem) was for a time classified with Talodi, but appears to be a separate branch of Niger–Congo.

== Rashad languages ==
The number of Rashad languages, also called Tegali–Tagoi, varies among descriptions, from two (Williamson & Blench 2000), three (Ethnologue), to eight (Blench ms). Tagoi has a noun-class system like the Atlantic–Congo languages, which is apparently borrowed, but Tegali does not.

== Katla languages ==
The two Katla languages have no trace of ever having had a Niger–Congo-type noun-class system.

== Kadu languages ==
Since the work of Thilo C. Schadeberg in 1981, the "Tumtum" or Kadu branch is now widely seen as Nilo-Saharan.

== Reconstruction ==
Quint (2020) suggests that Proto-Kordofanian can be reconstructed from the Heibanian, Talodian, Rashadian, Katloid, and Lafofa languages. His Proto-Kordofanian reconstructions are as follows:

Gloss	Proto-Kordofanian	Talodian	Heibanian	Lafofa	Katloid (Tima)	Rashadian
bark 1 (n.)	*-mVk-	*t-ə-mək	Koalib kìmùukùl [kìmùugùl]			Orig kìmbàkɔ́l
bark 2 (n.)	*k(V)VrE ~ *c(V)VrE			c-iíri	kúúr	*g-ware
beat / hit	*-bV-	*-gob- / *kə-bɔ	*-bid̪-	...biŋ		Orig bí(r) / pù(ró)
belly	*-VrVk ~ *-VɽVk	*j-+-arag / *ca-rək	*g-+-aare	t̪-úur-i	kúɽúún	
bite / eat	*-CVk	*-gVjog / *kə-ɟɔ	*-iy-	...jiɛ		*yɛk
blood	*(C)iC_{P}V	*ŋ-+-ittsug / *ŋ-ɪccʊk			Katla ija ~ iya	Rashad wiya
breast	*CVmiC	*j-+-intsig / *c-ə-mmik			Tima kɨ̀míndì	*d-miɲ
clothes	*kErEC	*k-ɛrɛt̪	*g-+-ered̪			Tagoi kɛr(ɛ́)w
dry	*-OndV	*-an d̪o	*-unDo			*-uddi
ear	*kVnV	*g-+-eenu / *k-ɛnu	*g- / n-+-aani		kɔ́.nɔ̀	Tagoi finin, Tegali (a)nuu
elephant	*-VŋV(C)		*d-+-oŋor	yuːŋi		*(fV)ŋVn
eye	*?+-git	*j-+-igg / *c-it			Katla gɨgöt	*y-ngid
foot / leg	*-AkA(C)	*ts-+-agag	Koalib káakà [káagà]	l-ia-ga		*d-ɛgɛn
goat	*Em(b)iT	*w-+-emig / *u-mit		ɛɛmi	Tima címìd̪	*mbɨt
green / wet	*-iklV ~ *ijlV		*-iigla	b-ʊ́ɒji-lli		Tagoi -ijilú, Tegali -rígɛ̂l
hair	*kaam ~ *gaam	*d-+-ʊgaŋ / *NC-ŋən̪			Tima káàm	*g-aam
head	*gaC_{DP} ~ *C_{P}aC_{DP}	*j-+-ats, *c-ac			Katla gas	*g-aj
left (side)	*-C_{V}ul- ~ *-C_{V}ur-	*-gule / *-gulɛ	*-awur	kúlɪ		*-awwir
mud	*-ElO		Koalib kèlòo		Tima k-ʌ́ʌ́lu	Orig ŋí̧lɔ́
near	*-Et̪t̪OC	*-iddu / *-t̪t̪o-t	Koalib kɛ́ttɔ̀k [kɛ́t̪t̪ɔ̀k]		Tima mɛ̀t̪ɛ́n	Tagoi gattɔŋ / tɔgɔt
one	*attV ~ *addV		*-aDDe		Tima àtíín	Orig wàttá
rain	*kaw ~ *kal	*k-abɪk	*g-+-aw	k-állɔ́-y		*(y)au
red	*-OrdE	*-oode / *-d̪ɛ	*-UUre		Tima -rdí	*-araw
sheep	*kAC_{V}AC	*t̪ʊ-ŋgat̪	Koalib káaŋàl	βaːŋi	(k)áŋàl	Orig kàgóy
smoke (n.)	*-uC_{LVB}bV		*g-+-ulu	c-oor-í	kʊ̀ʊ̀ɽʊ́n	Tagoi k(ə)rək, Tegali tulɛ́
sun	*-VC_{N}V	*j-+-iŋgi, *c-ə-ŋgi	Ø-+*-aŋin		kínèè	*-aane
tongue	*-d̪Vŋl(V) ~ *-d̪VlVŋ(V)	*d̪-+-(V)lVŋe / *tʊ-ləŋɛ	d̪-+*-ŋela	l-íáŋ-i	kìlíŋíì	*d-aŋil(-ag)
vomit	*-UdA ~ *-UwA	-VddV / *uk-dɛ	*-wey-	lwâ-d̪aŋ... lwa	-húwʌ̀	*VdVk

=== Lexical isoglosses ===
Starostin (2018) lists the following common lexical isoglosses in the Kordofanian languages. Potential cognates are highlighted in bold.

Proto-language	eye	bone	egg	tooth	ear	tongue	head	I	thou
Proto-Heiban	***=ey**	***=uya**	***=ɛɲɔ(ŋ)**	***=iŋa-t̪**	***=ɛːni**	***=ŋɛla**	*=da	***(i)ɲ=i**	***(u)ŋ=a**
Proto-Talodi	***=igi**	*=umV	***=uwi(ŋ)**	***=iɲi-t**	***=ɛːnu**	***=lʊŋɛ**	***=âs**	***ŋ=i**	***(u)ŋ=a**
(Proto-)Lafofa	**=î**	=uami	**=uwɛ-**	**=ɛːŋı**		**liaŋi**	**=ay**	ɲɛ-	ŋɔ-
Proto-Katla-Tima	***=igi**	***=uga**	***=iwɔɲ**		***=ɔnɔ**	***=liŋi**	***=as**	ɲɔŋ	ŋaŋ
Proto-Rashad	***=i(ŋ)gə**	***=uh**	*iye (?)	***=iɲi-n**	***=əni-n**	***=ŋəla**	***=as**	***ŋ=i**	***ŋ=ɔ**
Proto-Kadu	*=yV	*kuɓa	*sule	***=kini**	*=ɛːsɔ	*ŋaɗɔ	*=at̪u	*aʔa	*oʔo

== Comparative vocabulary ==
Sample basic vocabulary of the Heiban, Talodi, Rashad, and Lafofa branches:

Note: In table cells with slashes, the singular form is given before the slash, while the plural form follows the slash.

Language	eye	ear	nose	tooth	tongue	mouth	blood	bone	tree	water	eat	name
Proto-Heiban	*ay / g-,j-	*-aani	*-ad̪alo / g-,j-; g-,n-	*-ŋad̪ / li-,j-	*-ŋela; *-iŋla ? / D-,d-	*-uuɲu	*-win / ŋ-	*-uya / li-,ŋu- (WC); *-uɲ / ʔ-,j- (E)	*-aaɽe / gu-,j- (WC)	*-aw / ŋ-	*-id̪d̪-	*-iriɲ / j-
Proto-Talodi	*c-it / k-	*k-ɛnu / 0-	*k-ə-ɲɟɛ / 0-,n-	*c-ə-ɲit / k-	*tʊ̪ -ləŋɛ / ḷə-	*t-̪ ɔn̪ / ḷ-	*ŋ-ɪccʊk	*c-ə-mma-ɲan̪ / m-	*p-ɪda / k-	*ŋ-ɪḷ,-ɪḷɪ	*ḷə-ɡɔ	*k-ə-ḷəŋan / 0- (or *...n̪)
Proto-Katloid	*g-ɪgɛd̪	*-ɔnɔ		*gɪ-lɛd̪	*-laŋɛd̪		*i-ju(u)				*-ʌ-lV-	
Tagoi	yígət / ŋə́gət	fənín / fənédit	yídir / ŋə́dər	tíɲən / ŋə́ɲən	táŋə́lak / yáŋə́lágɒt	kajər / hájɛrət	ŋɔ́y	kuh / huh	kafɔ́ / hafɔ́	ŋay	yɛk	pəŋən / fəŋən
Turjok	íŋgət / ŋ̀gət	fəniín / fəníínət	indər / ŋəndər	M. tiɲin / ŋiɲin	taŋəlk / yaŋəlak ~ yaŋəlɒgɔt	kiɲjɛr / siɲjɛr(g)ɔt	ŋɔ́y	kus / sus	kafɔ / safɔ́	ŋaay		pɛŋɛn / sɛŋɛn
Tagom	ŋgə́t̚ / ŋgə́de	nu ~ nũũ / núun ~ anuun	ndr̀ / ndr̀re	ɲîn / ɲîne	aŋa / aŋún	̩ɲjár / (a)ɲjáre	óyá / óyo̍n	uru / urûn	lás / lásɛ	ega	yɛk	ɛŋɛn / ɛŋɛnɛ́ɛn
Tegem	ṭ-ì, ʤ-ì / m-		kә́-ràŋ(ì) / a-	ṭ-ɛ̀ɲ(ì) / k-	l-iәŋ(ì)	k-ɛɲi / ɛɲi	ɲɪ̀	ṭ-uɔ̀m(ì) / m-	kuwö(ì) / bɔɔ(ì)	ɲìì	kɪ́rɪ̀k	ku-ruwә̀ŋ / a-
El Amira	lilaŋ / ɲimaŋ		wimu	t-aɲ / k-	liŋ	kiɲ	ɲi	tuwam	kwa	ɲi	palith	

=== Numerals ===
Comparison of numerals in individual languages:

Classification	Language	1	2	3	4	5	6	7	8	9	10
Katla	Katla	ʈíʈʌ́k	cík	ʌ̀t̪ʌ́t̪	ʌ̀ɡʌ́lʌ̀m	ɟɔ́ɡ͡bə́lɪ́n	ɟɔ́lʈɪ́n	ɟɔ́lɪ́k	t̪ʌ́ŋɡɪ̀l	ɟʌ́lbʌ̀ʈɪ́n	ràk͡pác
Katla	Tima	ʌt̪een / at̪ɪɪn	iheek	ihwʌy	ihʌlʌm	iduliin	ɪntədakwalɔŋ	ɪnt̪at̪ɪŋɛɛl	ɪnt̪ɪŋɛrɛy	int̪ʌhʌdʌkun	ihedʌkún
Rashad	Tagoi (Orig)	-wàttá / ùttá	wùkkók	wìttá	wàrʊ̀m	wʊ̧ràm	ɲérér	ʊ̀mʊ̀rɡʊ́	tùppá	kʊ́mnàsá(n)	kʊ́mán
Rashad	Tegali	m̪t̪a	rəkkʊ / rʊkkʊ	d̪akt̪a / d̪at̪t̪a	aːrəm	ʊmmə	ɲeˑɽe	ʊmmərkʊ	duˑpˑa	fəŋɪsan	fəŋən
Heiban	Warnang (Werni/Wernang)	ŋɔ̀ʈʈɔ́r	ŋèrccáccény	ŋèrráttén	ŋèlàmlàŋ	ŋera ŋoʈʈor	ŋera ŋoʈʈor ŋemabolo ŋoʈʈor (5+1?)	ŋera ŋoʈʈor ŋemabolo ŋèrccáccény (5+2?)	ŋelamlaaŋɔ (4 x 2 ?)	ŋera ŋoʈʈor wanoe (1- ?)	kiccukurrɐ
Heiban	Moro	ɡónto	lə́ɡə́tʃan	lə́ɡɪ́tʃɪn	márlon	ðénə́ŋ	ðénə́ŋ nəɡónto (5+ 1)	ðénə́ŋ lə́ɡə́tʃan (5+ 2)	ðénə́ŋ lə́ɡɪ́tʃan (5+ 3)	ðénə́ŋ nəmárlon (5+ 4)	rɛ́θ
Heiban	Tira	kɛ̀nːɛ	kɪ̀ɽɪcàn	kɪ̀ɽɪcɪ́n	maɬɽʊ̀	ðɛ́nɛ̀	ɽɪ̀cín ɽɪ̀cɪ̀n (3+3)	maɬɽʊ kɪ̀ɽɪcɪ̀n (4+3)	ɔ́bːɔ̀	ðɛ́nɛ̀ n̪maɬɽʊ̀ (5+4)	ʊ́rːɪ̀
Heiban	Laro	kʷɛ̀tɛ̀	rɔ́m	tə̀ɽìl	kʷɔ̀ɾɔ̀ŋɔ́	tʊ̀dìní	ɲə̀rlə̀l	kʷɔ̀ɾátə̀ɾìl (4+3)	ɗúbə̀	tʊ̀dìní kʷɔ̀ɾɔ̀ŋɔ́ (5+ 4)	dí
Heiban	Otoro	wɛ̀dɔ́ŋ	kútèn	t̪èɽel	kɔ̀ɽɔŋ	t̪ɔ̀ðːnɛ	ɲɛ̄ɽɛl	kɔ̀ɽɔ t̪eɽel (4+3)	dúbə	t̪ɔ́ðːnɛ́ kɔ̀ɽɔŋ (5+ 4)	dìː
Heiban	Koalib (1)	kwɛ́t:ɛ	kwiɽín	tɛjɪɾ	kɔɽŋɔn	tuðní	ɲiɾlíl	kunəðɗuβə	ɗuβaβuŋa	kunəðɗi	ɗí
Heiban	Koalib (2)	-ɛ̀t̪t̪ɛ̀	-iɽɐn	tɔɔɽɔl	twaɽŋan	toðne	ɲerlel	ɗòvɔ̀kkwóɽɔ̀n	ɗòvɔ̀kkwóppà	kwúnɐ̀ttùrrí	rúi
Talodi	Dagik	j-ɜlːʊ	j-ɛːɽa	j-ɜt̪ːɜk̚	bɽandɔ	si-s-ɜlːʊ (litː one hand)	na-j-ɜlːʊ (5 + 1)	na j-ɛːɽa (5 + 2)	na j-ɜt̪ːɜk̚ (5 + 3)	na bɽandɔ (5 + 4)	n̪ipɽa
Talodi	Acheron	bulluk	weɽʌk	wʌt̪t̪ʌk	bɽando	zəɡuŋ zulluk (lit: 'one hand')	zəɡuŋ zulluk na bulluk (5 + 1)	zəɡuŋ zulluk na weɽʌk (5 + 2)	zəɡuŋ zulluk na wʌt̪t̪ʌk (5 + 3)	zəɡuŋ zulluk na bɽando (5 + 4)	ɡurruŋ
Talodi	Lumun	cʊ́lʊ́kʊ̂	mɛ̀ɽá	mɽaβʊ́ɾʊ̀k	mɔ́ʲɔ̀ɽɪ̀n	mʊ́ɣʊ́lʊ̀k	mɽakʊ́ɾʊ̀k	mɛ́ɽɛ̀ɽàβʊ́ɾʊ̂k ( 3) ?	mámɔ̀ɾmɔ̀ɾ (2 x 4) ?	mʊ́ɣʊ́lláʲɔ̀ɽɪ̀n (5 + 4)	mɑ̀tul

== See also ==
- Languages of the Nuba Mountains

== Bibliography ==
- Herman Bell. 1995. The Nuba Mountains: Who Spoke What in 1976? (archive link). Being a study of the published results from a major project of the Institute of African and Asian Studies: the Language Survey of the Nuba Mountains.
- Roger Blench. Unpublished. Does Kordofanian constitute a group and if not, where does its languages fit into Niger-Congo?
- Roger Blench. Unpublished. Kordofanian and Niger–Congo: new and revised lexical evidence.
- Roger Blench, 2011, Should Kordofanian be split up?, Nuba Hills Conference, Leiden
- P. A. and D. N. MacDiarmid. 1931. "The languages of the Nuba Mountains." Sudan Notes and Records 14: 149-162.
- Carl Meinhof. 1915-1919. "Sprachstudien im egyptischen Sudan". Zeitschrift für Kolonialsprachen 9-9. "1. Tagoy." 6: 164-161. "2. Tumale". 6:182-205. "11. Tegele." 7:110-131. "12. Rashad." 7:132.
- Thilo C. Schadeberg. 1981a. A survey of Kordofanian. SUGIA Beiheft 1-2. Hamburg:Helmut Buske Verlag.
- Thilo C. Schadeberg. 1981b. "Das Kordofanische". Die Sprachen Afrikas. Band 1: Niger–Kordofanisch, ed. by Bernd Heine, T. C. Schadeberg, Ekkehard Wolff, pp. 117–28 SUGIA Beiheft 1-2. Hamburg:Helmut Buske Verlag.
- Thilo C. Schadeberg. 1981c. "The classification of the Kadugli language group". Nilo-Saharan, ed. by T. C. Schadeberg and M. Lionel Bender, pp. 291–305. Dordrecht: Foris Publications.
- Brenda Z. Seligmann. 1910-11. "Note on the language of the Nubas of Southern Kordofan." Zeitschrift für Kolonialsprachen 1:167-188.
- Roland C. Stevenson. 1956-57. "A survey of the phonetics and grammatical structure of the Nuba Mountains languages, with particular reference to Otoro, Katcha, and Nyimang." Afrika und Übersee 40:73-84, 93-115; 41:27-65, 117-152, 171-196.
- Tucker, A. N. and M. A. Bryan. 1956. The Non-Bantu Languages of North-Eastern Africa. (Handbook of African Languages, Part III.) Oxford University Press: London.
- A. N. Tucker and M. A. Bryan. 1966. Linguistic Analyses/The Non-Bantu Languages of North-Eastern Africa. (Handbook of African Languages.) Oxford University Press: London.
- Tutschek, Lorenz. 1848. "Über die Tumale-Sprache." Gelehrte Anzeigen, herausgegeben von Mitgliedern der k. bayer. Akademie der Wissenschaften. Nrs. 91-93; Spalten 729-52. (=Bulletin der königl. Akademie der Wissenschaften. Nrs. 29-31.)
- Tutschek, Lorenz.. 1848-50. "On the Tumali language". Proceedings of the Philological Society for 1846-47 and 1847-48. Vol 3:239-54. Proceedings of the Philological Society for 1848-49 and 1849-50. Vol. 4:138-9.
