= Rashad District =

Rashad
- District
- Country: Sudan
- State: South Kordofan

Rashad is a district of South Kordofan state, Sudan.

== Climate ==
Climate data for Rashad (1991–2020, extremes 1961-2020)
Month	Jan	Feb	Mar	Apr	May	Jun	Jul	Aug	Sep	Oct	Nov	Dec	Year
Record high °C (°F)	40.0 (104.0)	41.2 (106.2)	43.4 (110.1)	44.4 (111.9)	41.0 (105.8)	39.6 (103.3)	38.6 (101.5)	36.9 (98.4)	39.7 (103.5)	39.6 (103.3)	38.7 (101.7)	38.3 (100.9)	44.4 (111.9)
Mean daily maximum °C (°F)	30.9 (87.6)	33.1 (91.6)	35.8 (96.4)	37.5 (99.5)	35.8 (96.4)	33.1 (91.6)	30.2 (86.4)	29.1 (84.4)	31.2 (88.2)	33.1 (91.6)	33.5 (92.3)	31.6 (88.9)	32.9 (91.2)
Daily mean °C (°F)	24.7 (76.5)	26.7 (80.1)	29.6 (85.3)	31.5 (88.7)	29.9 (85.8)	27.6 (81.7)	25.7 (78.3)	24.9 (76.8)	26.0 (78.8)	27.2 (81.0)	27.7 (81.9)	25.5 (77.9)	27.3 (81.1)
Mean daily minimum °C (°F)	18.5 (65.3)	20.4 (68.7)	23.4 (74.1)	25.5 (77.9)	24.1 (75.4)	22.1 (71.8)	21.2 (70.2)	20.8 (69.4)	20.9 (69.6)	21.3 (70.3)	21.8 (71.2)	19.5 (67.1)	21.6 (70.9)
Record low °C (°F)	6.8 (44.2)	9.0 (48.2)	11.0 (51.8)	16.3 (61.3)	17.2 (63.0)	16.0 (60.8)	16.5 (61.7)	13.5 (56.3)	16.0 (60.8)	10.5 (50.9)	11.5 (52.7)	9.3 (48.7)	9.0 (48.2)
Average precipitation mm (inches)	0.0 (0.0)	0.0 (0.0)	3.0 (0.12)	6.0 (0.24)	48.8 (1.92)	77.3 (3.04)	154.1 (6.07)	192.0 (7.56)	125.1 (4.93)	80.0 (3.15)	0.9 (0.04)	0.0 (0.0)	687.2 (27.06)
Average precipitation days (≥ 1 mm)	0.0	0.0	0.3	0.8	4.8	8.0	11.3	12.9	10.5	7.5	0.2	0.0	56.4
Average relative humidity (%)	21	17	15	19	39	56	67	72	67	52	26	27	40
Source: NOAA
