= Kay Williamson =

British linguist of Nigerian languages (1935–2005)

- Born: Ruth Margaret Williamson; January 26, 1935; Hereford, England, United Kingdom
- Died: January 3, 2005 (aged 69); Brazil
- Education: St Hilda's College, Oxford; BA in English, 1956; MA, 1960; Yale University; PhD, 1964
- Occupation: Linguist
- Organization(s): University of Ibadan, University of Port Harcourt
- Known for: "The mother of Nigerian linguistics"; authority on the Ijaw languages
- Parent(s): Harry Williamson; Harriett Eileen Williamson

Kay Williamson (January 26, 1935, Hereford, United Kingdom – January 3, 2005, Brazil), born Ruth Margaret Williamson, was a linguist who specialised in the study of African languages, particularly those of the Niger Delta in Nigeria, where she lived for nearly fifty years. She has been called "The Mother of Nigerian Linguistics" and is also notable for proposing the Pan-Nigerian alphabet.

Her work emphasized the urgency of preserving minority and colonial legacies, often employing collaborative methods with local informants to ensure cultural accuracy.

== Early life ==
Kay Williamson was born in Hereford, England, where she lived for the first 18 years of her life. She was the eldest of six children. Her father, Alfred Henry Williamson, also known as Harry, was the founder of Wyevale Nurseries. Her father and mother, Harriett Eileen Williamson, turned the Wyevale nurseries into one of the largest garden center chains in Europe. Williamson was educated at Hereford girls' high school and St Hilda's College, Oxford, where she took a BA in English in 1956, followed by an MA in 1960.

== Career ==
Her many publications include a grammar and dictionary of the Ijo language, a dictionary of Igbo and numerous articles on diverse topics.

Kay Williamson was known for her concern for social responsibility in linguistics. She was totally convinced that a linguist must help speakers of the languages of her research to produce texts in their languages. She devoted a substantial part of her time to the Rivers Readers Project, an exercise designed to introduce reading and writing in primary schools in about 20 dialects or languages in the predominantly Ijo-speaking area. As a byproduct, several books (including primers, readers, teachers' notes, spelling manuals, and collection of folk-tales) were compiled by Williamson and her collaborators.

In 2002, she was appointed UNESCO Professor of Cultural Heritage, University of Port Harcourt, a position she held until her death.

Her unpublished work is being edited by Roger Blench.

== Later life ==
Williamson was brought up as a Methodist but became a Quaker in the early 1990s, and subsequently took peace activism very seriously.

She died at the age of 69 in Brazil on 3 January 2005.

The Kay Williamson Educational Foundation has been established to support work in Nigerian languages.

== Major publications ==
- Williamson, Kay. 1965 (2nd ed. 1969). A Grammar of the Kolokuma Dialect of Ịjọ. (West African Language Monographs, 2.) London: Cambridge University Press 2011: ISBN 0521175267
- Williamson, Kay, and Kiyoshi Shimizu (edd.). 1968. Benue-Congo Comparative Wordlist: Volume I. Ibadan: West African Linguistic Society.
- Williamson, Kay (ed.) 1972. Igbo-English Dictionary. Benin: Ethiope Publishing Corporation.
- Williamson, Kay (ed.). 1973. Benue-Congo Comparative Wordlist: Volume II. Ibadan: West African Linguistic Society.
- Williamson, Kay (ed.) 1983. Orthographies of Nigerian languages: Manual II. Lagos: National Language Centre, Federal Ministry of Education.
- Williamson, Kay, and A. O. Timitimi (edd.). 1983. Short Ịzọn-English Dictionary. (Delta Series No. 3.) Port Harcourt: University of Port Harcourt Press. ISBN 978-2321-09-5, ISBN 978-978-2321-09-1
- Williamson, Kay. 1984. Practical Orthography in Nigeria. Ibadan: Heinemann Educational Books.
- Williamson, Kay. 1971. "The Benue-Congo languages and Ịjọ". In: Current Trends in Linguistics, Vol. 7, series ed. by T. A. Sebeok, 245–306.
- Williamson, Kay. 1979. "Small languages in primary education: the Rivers Readers Project as a case history". African Languages/Langues Africaines 5:2. 95–105.
- Williamson, Kay. 1989. "Niger-Congo Overview". In: The Niger-Congo languages, ed. by John Bendor-Samuel, 3-45. University Press of America. ISBN 0819173754
- Williamson, Kay. 1989. "Benue-Congo Overview". In: The Niger-Congo languages, ed. by John Bendor-Samuel, 246–274. University Press of America. ISBN 0819173754
- Williamson, Kay, and Roger Blench. 2000. "Niger-Congo". In: African Languages: An Introduction, ed. B. Heine and D. Nurse, Chapter 2, 11–42. Cambridge: Cambridge University Press. ISBN 0521661781
