= Nuba Mountains =

Geographic area in Sudan

- Jibal an-Nūbā
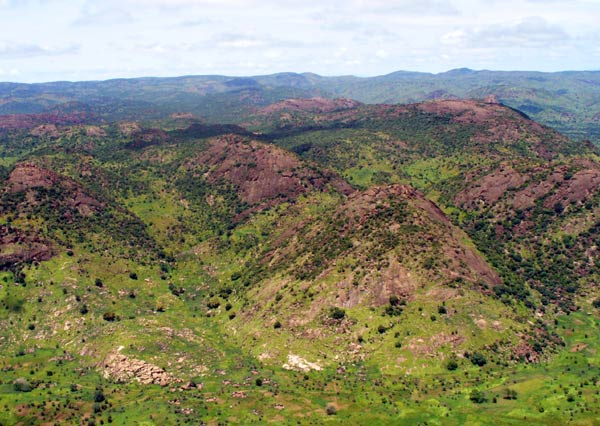
- The Nuba Mountains

Highest point
- Elevation: 1,325 m (4,347 ft)
- Coordinates: 12°1′N 31°6′E

Dimensions
- Length: 145 km (90 mi)
- Width: 64 km (40 mi)

Geography
- Location within Africa Location within Sudan
- Country: Sudan
- Region: South Kordofan

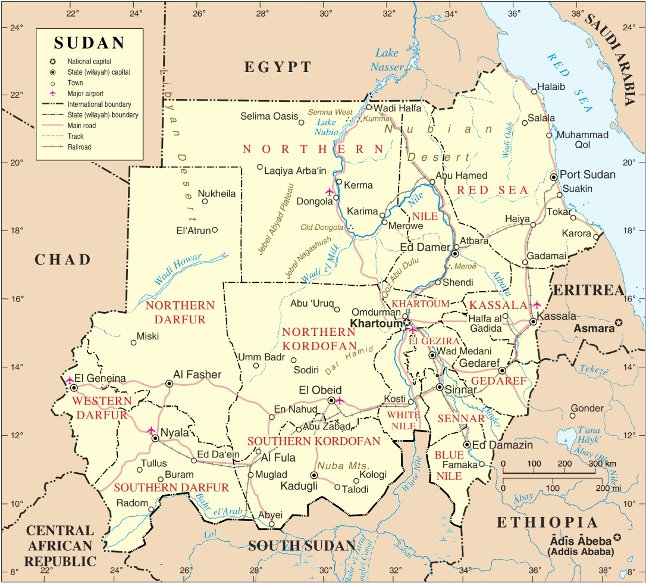
Map of Sudan (after 2011). The Nuba Mountains are labeled in Southern Kordofan

The Nuba Mountains, also referred to as the Nuba Hills, are an area located in South Kordofan, Sudan. The area is home to a group of indigenous ethnic groups known collectively as the Nuba peoples. They are not the same as the Nubians who are indigenous to north Sudan. Rather their name is derived from the name of the mountains, “Nuba”. In Antiquity, the area was a part of the Kingdom of Kush. In the Middle Ages, the Nuba mountains had been part of the Nubian kingdom of Alodia. In the 18th century, they became home to the kingdom of Taqali that controlled the hills of the mountains until their defeat by Mahdi Muhammad Ahmad. After the British defeated the Mahdi army, Taqali was restored as a client state. Infiltration of the Messiria tribe and Muraheleen of Baggara Arabs has been influential in modern conflicts. Up to 1.5 million people live in the mountains, mostly ethnic Nuba, with a small minority of Baggara.

== Geography ==
The mountains cover an area roughly 64 by 145 kilometres (40 by 90 mi), and are 450 to 900 metres (1,500 to 3,000 ft) higher in elevation than the surrounding plain. The mountains stretch for some 48,000 square kilometers (19,000 square miles). The climate is lush and green compared to most nearby areas, which are typically hot and semi-arid. These regions experience a rainy season from mid-May to mid-October, with annual rainfall ranging between 300 and 800 millimetres (12 to 31 inches), supporting grazing animals and seasonal rain-fed agriculture. At the end of the dry season from February to May there is often a shortage of water. There are almost no roads in the Nuba Mountains — most villages there are connected by ancient paths that cannot be reached by motor vehicle.

=== Geology ===
On a grand scale the rocks of the Nuba Mountains form part of the southwestern fringe of the Arabian-Nubian Shield. The Nuba Mountains are made up chiefly of metamorphic rock of Precambrian age plus some scattered areas of igneous rock of Neoproterozoic and Paleozoic age. Surrounding the area of the Nuba Mountains as a sea lies a vast area of Cenozoic-aged sedimentary rock known as the "Umm Rawaba sediments". In the Nuba Mountains there are phosphate deposits hosting much uranium, vanadium and phosphorus which may be of economic interest.

The largest mountains or hills are found in the central area of the Nuba Mountains, and these are inselbergs. These inselbergs are mostly made up of igneous rock, as metamorphic rock has been more heavily eroded and thus occupies lower ground.

== Political status ==
The region stayed under the control of the central government and the Comprehensive Peace Agreement did not give the Nuba Mountains the right to join South Sudan in its vote for independence in 2011. Residents of the Nuba Mountains were required to hold ill-defined "popular consultations" to determine their future. Not only the Nuba Mountains but the whole of South Kordofan state would be eligible to vote, essentially to accommodate the Messiria. Additionally, the Sudanese government maintained a heavy military presence in the region and even prospective "popular consultations" were seen likely to be barred. The ambiguous situation and fears of future communal violence invoked concerns that South Kordofan could be the "next Darfur".

As of June 2011, South Kordofan's governor Ahmed Haroun had suspended the process of popular consultations and conflict between Sudan People's Armed Forces and Nuba fighters of the SPLM-N followed (see Sudan–SPLM-N conflict (2011)).

The war in Sudan began in 1983 until the Comprehensive Peace Agreement (CPA) signed on 9 January 2005 with independence vote set for 9 July 2011-the vote on 9 July 2011 succeeded the south into Africa's newest country, the Republic of South Sudan. The capital is located in Juba. The Nuba Mountains are geographically in the north in the area called South Kordofan. The people of the Nuba Mountains (a five mountain chain rising from the desert to 1,000 metres (3,000 feet)) were not aligned with the north under sharia law nor the Arabic language. This cultural dispute was in part the reason for people in Nuba being prosecuted by indiscriminate bombing, attacks on civilians and mines at entry points to the Nuba Mountains. Samuel Totten described the campaign of the Sudanese government in the Nuba Mountains as a "genocide by attrition" using starvation as a tool of extermination. In 2002, due to the extreme starvation of the people of the Nuba Mountains and under the international pressure from the UN, Khartoum under President Bashir (at that time, the government was termed the National Islamic Front) authorizes an interim cease fire to provide food and medical equipment/support to the people of the Nuba Mountains. In exchange, the Sudan People's Liberation Army/SPLA agree not attack the south-north pipeline to Port Sudan on the Red Sea coast. An international group of observers/advisers deployed to South Kordofan Province/Kadugli with several US advisers deployed directly into the Nuba Mountains, specifically to be co-located with the SPLA. One of the advisers/observers was Randolph Hampton (US) located in Kauda co-located with the SPLA command element. Reports of indiscriminate bombing of civilians and mining entry points primarily for relief operation was reported and documents (with photos) during this time. Abdel Aziz Adam El Hilu was at that time, the governor of the Nuba Mountains and former military leader for the SPLA. He is currently (as of March 2012) back in the Nuba Mountains supporting relief and security operations.

The international community, including a number of celebrities such as actor George Clooney and reporter Nicholas Kristof, in 2015 travelled to the Nuba Mountains and documented the continued genocidal activities of the Bashir government. President Bashir is an indicted war criminal at the International Criminal Court (ICC) as a result of the genocidal activities of Sudan in Darfur. Human Rights Watch says that cluster bombs are used in the region.

The ongoing war continues as the international community continues to debate a resolution to the issue of the Nuba Mountains.

As of 2025 in the course of the civil war, most of the state including the largest city of Kologi are controlled by the secular free-market democrats under al-Hilu.

== See also ==
- Languages of the Nuba Mountains
- Tom Catena

== Literature ==
- Spaulding, Jay (1998). "Early Kordofan". In Endre Stiansen and Michael Kevane (ed.). Kordofan Invaded: Peripheral Incorporation in Islamic Africa. Brill. pp. 46–59. ISBN 9004110496.
