= Laro =

Laro can refer to:

- Laro, Burkina Faso, town in Balé province, Burkina Faso
- Laro (name), masculine given name and surname
- Laro people, ethnic group of Sudan

- Laro language, Niger-Congo language spoken by the Laro people

- Iteri language (also known as the Laro language), Left May language of Sandaun Province, Papua New Guinea
