= Logol =

Logol may refer to:

- Logol people, southern Sudan
- Logol language

== See also ==
- Lugol (disambiguation)
- Logology (disambiguation)
- Logo (disambiguation)
