= Koalib =

Koalib may refer to:

- Koalib people
- Koalib language
