= R with tail =

Letter of the Latin alphabet (Ɽ, ɽ)

Uppercase and lowercase Ɽ

Ɽ, ɽ is a letter of the Latin alphabet, derived from R with the addition of a tail. Its capital form may be based on either the uppercase or lowercase R.

== Unicode ==
The lowercase (ɽ) was added to Unicode since Unicode 1.0 while the uppercase (Ɽ) has only been added since Unicode 5.0.

The uppercase and lowercase codepoints are U+2C64 and U+027D, respectively.

== Usage ==
⟨ɽ⟩ is used in the International Phonetic Alphabet to represent a retroflex flap.

Ɽ is also used in the alphabets of several Sudanese languages, including Heiban, Koalib, Moro and Otoro. It is placed after R in alphabetical order.
