= Richard Rottenburg =

Richard Walter Rottenburg (Born February 6, 1953) is an Anthropologist of Science and Technology and Professor at Wits Institute for Social and Economic Research, University of the Witwatersrand.

== Academic life ==
Rottenburg studied social anthropology, sociology and Arab studies (1973-1978) at the Free University of Berlin. For his PhD in anthropology he conducted 39 months of fieldwork in South Kordofan (Sudan). Between 1984-1987, he lectured at the University of Transkei, South Africa. Later he did research on formal organization in companies and city administrations in Europe. In the 1990s Rottenburg worked as a consultant for projects in development cooperation, carrying out research in Africa and Europe. These engagements provided him with the ethnographic material for his habilitation, which he completed at Viadrina European University (Frankfurt/Oder) in 1999. In 2002 Rottenburg became full professor and founding director of the Institute for Social and Cultural Anthropology at the University of Halle-Wittenberg. There he established a research group around his research focus on Law, Organisation, Science and Technology (LOST). From 2006-2012 he was a Max Planck Fellow, heading a project on Biomedicine in Africa. He was head or spokesperson of several research programs. On February 8 and 9, 2013, the conference 'How to put models into practice? African perspectives on technologies of ordering in legal, organisational and medical contexts' was held in Halle to celebrate his work and his 60th birthday. In 2011 he co-initiated the Network for Science and Technology Studies in Africa, a platform that aims at advancing Science and Technology Studies in Africa. Richard Rottenburg has been appointed as Theodor Heuss Professor at The New School for Social Research in New York (USA) for the academic year 2014/15.

== Research interests ==
In his early work, Rottenburg's focus was on the effects of so-called modern traits in African settings. In his book on the life and economic strategies of the Lemwareng (Moro Nuba) in South Kordofan (Sudan) he conceptualized processes of cultural syncretization and hybridization as accretion (Akkreszenz). Rottenburg expanded this interest throughout his career, theorizing the travel of ideas, technologies and procedures and their intercultural translation, as well as the making of objectivity and rationality in various avenues. Thereby he combines insights from Science and Technology Studies with his expertise on Africa and his ethnographic attention to detail. This has resulted in the book 'Far-Fetched Facts', an 'epistemological thriller of development aid' as a critic of the Frankfurter Allgemeine Zeitung put it.

By connecting Social Anthropology to approaches from Science and Technology Studies, Rottenburg is a leading figure in taking German anthropology in new directions. In 2006 he created the research group LOST (Law, Organisation, Science and Technology), putting him at a center of studies concerning the translation of juridical, organizational, technological and scientific models in the Global South. His current work relates to the findings of this research program, in particular to the research group 'Biomedicine in Africa' and the ongoing research project on 'Translating Global Health Technologies' and circles around the question of therapeutic domination and experimentality, allowing insights in the shifting relations between the Global South and the Global North.

== See also ==
- Social Anthropology
- Translation studies
- Science and technology studies

== Main works ==
- Richard Rottenburg, Ndemwareng: Wirtschaft und Gesellschaft in den Morobergen, München, Edition Trickster, 1991.
- Richard Rottenburg, Far-Fetched Facts: A Parable of Development Aid, Cambridge, MIT Press, 2009.
- Richard Rottenburg, Social and public experiments and new figurations of science and politics in postcolonial Africa. Postcolonial Studies, vol. 12 no. 4 (2009) pp. 423–440. http://www.ingentaconnect.com/content/routledg/cpcs/2009/00000012/00000004/art00005
- Richard Rottenburg (edited with Katharina Schramm & David Skinner), Identity Politics and the New Genetics: Re/Creating Categories of Difference and Belonging, Oxford: Berghahn, 2011.
- Richard Rottenburg (edited with Wenzel Geissler & Julia Zenker), Rethinking Biomedicine and Governance in Africa: Contributions from Anthropology, Bielefeld, transcript, 2012.
- Rottenburg, Richard, Ethnologie und Kritik. In: Ethnologie im 21. Jahrhundert, edited by Bierschenk, Thomas, Matthias Krings & Carola Lentz. Berlin: Reimer (2013), pp. 55–76.
- Richard Rottenburg (with Matthias Kaufmann), Translation and Cultural Identity. Civiltà del Mediterraneo XII n.s. (23-24) (2013) pp. 229–348.
- Richard Rottenburg (edited with Andrea Behrends & Sung-Joon Park), Travelling Models in African Conflict Management. Translating technologies of social ordering. Leiden and Boston: Brill, 2014.
- Richard Rottenburg (with Sandra Calkins), Getting Credit for What You Write? Conventions and techniques of citation in German anthropology. Zeitschrift für Ethnologie, 139 (2014) pp. 99–130.
- Richard Rottenburg (edited with Jörg Gertel & Sandra Calkins), Disrupting territories: land, commodification and conflict in Sudan. Woodbridge: James Currey, 2014.
- Richard Rottenburg (edited with Sandra Calkins & Enrico Ille), Emerging Orders in the Sudans. Bamenda and Buea: Langaa, 2015.
- Richard Rottenburg (edited with Sally Engle Merry, Sung-Joon Park & Johanna Mugler), A world of indicators: The making of governmental knowledge through quantification. Cambridge: Cambridge University Press, 2015.
- Richard Rottenburg (with Enrico Ille & Guma Kunda Komey), Tragic entanglements: vicious circles and acts of violence in South Kordofan. In: Sudan's killing fields: political violence and fragmentation, edited by Laura Lyantung Beny and Sondra Hale. Trenton: Red Sea Press (2015), pp. 117–137.
- Richard Rottenburg (with Sandra Calkins, Enrico Ille & Siri Lamoureaux), Rethinking institutional orders in Sudan studies: the case of land access in Kordofan, Blue Nile and Darfur. Canadian Journal of African Studies 49 (1) (2015) pp. 175–195.
- Richard Rottenburg (with Andrea Behrends & Sung-Joon Park), Replik auf Röhl. Zeitschrift für Rechtssoziologie 35 (2) (2016) pp. 313–317.
- Richard Rotttenburg (with Sandra Calkins), Evidence, infrastructure and worth. In: Infrastructures and Social Complexity. A Companion, edited by Penny Harvey, Casper Bruun Jensen & Atsuro Morita. London: Routledge (2017) pp. 253–265.
