= Tira people =

Tira
Languages
- Tira, Arabic

Related ethnic groups
- Moro

The Tira are a sub-ethnic group of the Nuba peoples in the Nuba Mountains of South Kordofan state, in southern Sudan. The population of Tira was around 40,000 thousand in 1982

== Language ==
They speak Tira of the Kordofanian languages group, in the major Niger–Congo language family. They also speak Sudanese Arabic.

== See also ==
- Index: Nuba peoples
