= FUJ =

FUJ or fuj may refer to:

- FUJ, the IATA code for Fukue Airport, Gotō, Japan
- fuj, the ISO 639-3 code for Fungor language, Sudan
