= Nding people =

Total population
- 3,513 (In 1984)

Languages
- Sudanese Arabic, Nding

Related ethnic groups
- Talodi

The Nding, also known as the Eliri after the Eliri Hills, is an ethnic group in Sudan. The members of this group speak the Nding language and live in the Eliri Hills in South Kordofan. Their primary language is Sudanese Arabic.
