= TQR =

TQR may refer to:

- Tigres de Quintana Roo, a Mexican professional baseball team
- tQR code, a type of QR code for rail transport
- tqr, the ISO code for the Torona language
- Tour Qualifying Round of the PBA Tour for tenpin bowling
