= Turum people =

Turum is an ethnic group in South Darfur in Sudan. They speak Sudanese Arabic. The main religion is Islam.

== Society and living conditions ==
Turum communities depend largely on rain‑fed agriculture, livestock rearing and access to limited water sources in an environment marked by recurrent drought and resource competition. Reports describe a context of tension and occasional violence between the Turum and neighboring groups, particularly the Rizeigat tribe, over land and water, aggravated by broader conflict dynamics and by the role of the Sudanese state.

== See also ==
- Nuba peoples
- Nuba Mountains
- Koalib language
- Tagoi language
