= Tacho people =

Ethnic group of South Sudan

Total population
- 23,000

Languages
- Tacho

Religion
- Sunni Islam

Related ethnic groups
- Talodi

Tacho is an indigenous ethnic group of South Sudan based mainly around southern Kordofan and in the Moro Hills and in the areas surrounding the border between Sudan and South Sudan. They are also known by the names Tocho and Toicho; about 90% of the population practice Islam as their main religion.

They speak Tocho, which is of the Talodi language group, with its root in the Niger-Congo languages. However they also speak Sudanese Arabic. Today their population possibly numbers less than 10,000.
