= Shawaya people =

Ethnic group from Sudan's Nuba Mountains with distinct language and cultural identity

Shawaya also known as Shwai is an ethnic group in Sudan. They speak Shwai, a Niger–Congo language. The origin of this ethnic group is in the southern Nuba Mountains and they live near the Otoro people and Heiban people. The Shawaya are predominately Muslim.

On 13 May 2026, 61 civilians were killed when the rebel group Sudan People's Liberation Movement–North (SPLM-N) led by Abdelaziz al-Hilu clashed with members from the Otoro tribe near Kauda, South Kordofan. The conflict had stemmed from Otoro tribesmen removing land boundary markers which lead to a confrontation between the Otoro and Shawaya tribes.
