= Logol people =

Logol
Languages
- Logol

Religion
- Sunni Islam

Related ethnic groups
- Dilling, Heiban, Otoro

The Logol or Lukha are a sub-ethnic group of the Nuba peoples in the eastern parts of Nuba Mountains between Talodi and the White Nile. Nuba mountains are in the state of South Kordofan state, in southern Sudan. They speak the Logol language of the Kordofanian languages group, in the major Niger–Congo language family.

== See also ==
- Index: Nuba peoples
