= Shwai language =

Niger–Congo language of Sudan

Shwai
- Shirumba
- Native to: Sudan
- Region: Nuba Hills
- Ethnicity: Shwai
- Native speakers: (3,500 cited 1989)
- Language family: Niger–Congo?: Kordofanian; Talodi–Heiban; Heiban; West–Central; Shirumba; Shwai
- Dialects: Ndano; Shabun; Shirumba
- Writing system: Latin

Language codes
- ISO 639-3: shw
- Glottolog: shwa1239
- ELP: Shwai
- Shwai is classified as Critically Endangered by the UNESCO Atlas of the World's Languages in Danger.

Shwai (Shuway) is a Niger–Congo language in the Heiban family spoken in South Kordofan, Sudan. It is also called Ludumor. Dialects are Shabun, Cerumba (Shirumba), Ndano.
