= Dagik language =

Talodi language spoken in Sudan

Dagik
- Dhaduwa
- Native to: Sudan
- Region: Nuba Hills
- Ethnicity: Mesakin
- Native speakers: 67,000 (2022)
- Language family: Niger–Congo?: Kordofanian; Talodi–Heiban; Talodi; Ngile–Dengebu; Dagik
- Dialects: Arreme; Adobu; Tosari
- Writing system: Latin

Language codes
- ISO 639-3: dec
- Glottolog: dagi1241

Dagik, or Dengebu, Dagig, Thakik, Buram, Reikha, is a Niger–Congo language in the Talodi family spoken in the Nuba Mountains in South Kordofan, Sudan. It is 80% lexically similar to Ngile, which is also spoken by the Mesakin people.

The most comprehensive grammar is that of Vanderelst (2016).

== Phonology ==
=== Consonants ===
	Labial	Dental	Alveolar	Retroflex	Palatal	Velar	Glottal
Plosive	p	t̪	t			k	
Fricative	(f)		s				(h)
Nasal	m	n̪	n			ŋ	
Rhotic			r	ɽ			
Approximant	w		l		j		

- Sounds /p, t̪, t, k/ can have intervocalic allophones as sonorants [β, ð, ɾ, ɣ], and voiced allophones [b, d̪, d, ɡ] when after nasals.
- Sounds [f, h] only have marginal status.
- /r/ can also be heard as a tap [ɾ] allophone.

=== Vowels ===
	Front	Central	Back
Close	i		u
Close	ɪ		ʊ
Mid	ɛ	ə	ɔ
Open	a		

- /u/ can also assimilate to a close-mid [o] in different environments.
