= Koalib people =

Ethnic group in southern Sudan

Languages
- Koalib

Religion
- Islam and Catholicism

Related ethnic groups
- Talodi, Heiban

Koalib Nuba are an ethnic group, a part of the Nuba peoples that are indigenous to the Nuba Mountains of South Kordofan state, Sudan.

They are amongst the largest Nuba ethnic groups numbering around 20,000 thousand in the 1940s and 44,258 thousand in 1984.

The etymological origin for the name 'Koalib', is uncertain but its only used by outsiders. The Koalib call themselves Lgalege, by which name they are also known to their Nuba neighbours.The Koalib live in the Koalib mountains near Delami.

== Language ==
They speak Koalib of the Kordofanian languages group, in the major Niger–Congo language family.

== See also ==
- Index: Nuba peoples
