= Ngile language =

Niger Congo unwritten language

Ngile
- Daloka
- Native to: Sudan
- Region: South Kordofan
- Ethnicity: Mesakin
- Native speakers: 39,000 (2024)
- Language family: Niger–Congo?: Kordofanian; Talodi–Heiban; Talodi; Ngile–Dengebu; Ngile
- Writing system: Latin (limited use)

Language codes
- ISO 639-3: jle
- Glottolog: ngil1242
- ELP: Ngile
- Ngile is classified as Severely Endangered by the UNESCO Atlas of the World's Languages in Danger.

Ngile, also known as Daloka, Taloka, Darra, Masakin, Mesakin, is a Niger–Congo unwritten language in the Talodi family spoken in the southern Nuba Mountains in the south of Sudan. It is 80% lexically similar to Dengebu, which is also spoken by the Mesakin people.

== Dialects ==
Dialects are (Ethnologue, 22nd edition):

- Masakin Tuwal dialect (spoken in Masakin and Togosilu villages)
- Daloka dialect (spoken in Daloka and El Aheimar villages)
