= Laro people =

Laro
Languages
- Laro

Religion
- Christianity, Sunni Islam

The Laro are an ethnic group in Sudan, numbering several tens of thousands. Their traditional home is in the Nuba Hills near the Heiban people.

They speak Laro, a Niger–Congo language. Many members of this group are Christians, but a minority of them are Muslims.
