= Tocho language =

Niger–Congo language of Sudan

Tocho
- Tacho
- Native to: Sudan
- Region: South Kordofan
- Ethnicity: Tacho
- Native speakers: 2,700 (2013)
- Language family: Niger–Congo?: Atlantic–Congo; Talodi–Heiban; Talodi; Tocho languages; Tocho
- Writing system: Latin

Language codes
- ISO 639-3: taz
- Glottolog: toch1257
- ELP: Tocho
- Tocho is classified as Severely Endangered by the UNESCO Atlas of the World's Languages in Danger.

Tocho (Tacho) is a Niger–Congo language in the Talodi family spoken in Kordofan, Sudan. It is spoken by approximately 2,700 people in the following villages: Igije, Imanjela, Thodero, Thoge, Tobaredeng, Tocho Goos, Tocho Saraf Jamus, Toderum, Togero, Togiding, Toriya, Torobang, Tothokrek and Turu.

== Grammar ==
=== Phonology ===
==== Consonant phonemes ====
Following is presented the list of Tocho consonant phonemes according to Akaki and Norton (2013:178). In Tocho, plosives and nasals can be pronounced in all five places, but nasals are missing a dental representative. Compared to older data (Schadeberg 1981), the flap [ɽ] is mostly merging with the trill [r, rr], but one can also argue that the newer data (Alaki & Norton 2013:178-180) was collected in Khartoum, where Sudanese Arabic (which does not contain a flap (ɽ), but has a trill [r]) is the official language. So the merging can not be confirmed yet and has to be verificated with data in the villages where Tocho is spoken.

	Bilabial	Dental	Alveolar
Plosives
Nasals
Approximants
Trill
Flap

=== Noun classes ===
The Tocho language uses different prefixes to differentiate the numerus of nouns, sorted by noun classes with individual prefix-pairs. Those prefix-pairs consist of mostly all consonant phonemes and the option of none prefix (marked as ø). In most of the classes only the first consonant changes, but in some the difference between singular and plural is also indicated through a change in some of the first vowels, as for example /ʊ ~ ə/ and /a ~ ə/.
