= Warnang language =

Niger–Congo language of Kordofan, Sudan

Werni
- Warnang
- Native to: Sudan
- Region: South Kordofan
- Ethnicity: Werni
- Native speakers: (1,100 cited 1956 census)
- Language family: Niger–Congo?: Atlantic–Congo; Talodi–Heiban; Heiban; East Heiban; Werni

Language codes
- ISO 639-3: wrn
- Glottolog: warn1244

The Werni language, also known as Warnang, is a small Niger–Congo language of the Heiban family spoken in South Kordofan, Sudan.
