= Acheron language =

Niger–Congo language of Kordofan, Sudan

Acheron
- Asheron
- ɡə-rəmɛ
- Pronunciation: /ɡə-rəmɛ/
- Native to: Sudan
- Region: Nuba Hills
- Native speakers: 20,000 (2006); 9,800 in home area (2006)
- Language family: Niger–Congo?: Talodi–Heiban?; Talodi; Tocho languages; Acheron
- Dialects: Gathuk; Gandok; Garong

Language codes
- ISO 639-3: acz
- Glottolog: ache1245
- ELP: Acheron
- Acheron is classified as Severely Endangered by the UNESCO Atlas of the World's Languages in Danger.

Acheron (Asheron) is a language in the Talodi family spoken in South Kordofan, Sudan.

Acheron derives from the Arabic word aɟɟur-uun [sic] which means "innocent people", it was later "indigenised as /acʊrʊn/" and turned into /aʃərɔn/. The autoethonym in Acheron is /wɑ-rəmɛ/ for the people and /ɡə-rəmɛ/ for the language.

The number of active speakers is estimated to be 9,800. This number includes the community members and "diaspora speakers" in other Sudanese towns and abroad.

== Phonology ==
=== Consonants ===
Consonants
		Bilabial	Dental	Alveolar		Post- alveolar	Palatal	Velar	
Plosive	voiceless	pː	t̪ː			t		k	kː
Plosive	voiced	b	d̪			d	ɟ	g	gw
Fricative	voiceless			s	sː				
Fricative	voiced		ð	z					
Nasal	short	m				n	ɲ	ŋ	
Nasal	long	mː				nː	ɲː	ŋː	
Trill				r	rː				
Tap						ɽ			
Approximant	short					l	j	w	
Approximant	long					lː		wː	

Norton (2000) calls /s/ and /k/ "stiff cord" segments, saying they are always voiceless, with other short plosives and fricatives varying in voicing.

=== Vowels ===
Vowels
		Front	Central	Back
Close	[+ATR]	i		u
Close	[-ATR]	ɪ		ʊ
Mid		ɛ	ə	ɔ
Open			a	

Norton (1995) posited 10 vowels: 5 [-ATR] /ɪ, ɛ, a, ɔ ʊ/ and 5 [+ATR] /i, e, ɜ, o, u/. However, Norton (2013) has 8 vowels: [-ATR] /ɪ, ɛ, ə, ɑ, ɔ, ʊ/ and [+ATR] /i u/.
