= Nuba wrestling =

Traditional sports of the Nuba peoples

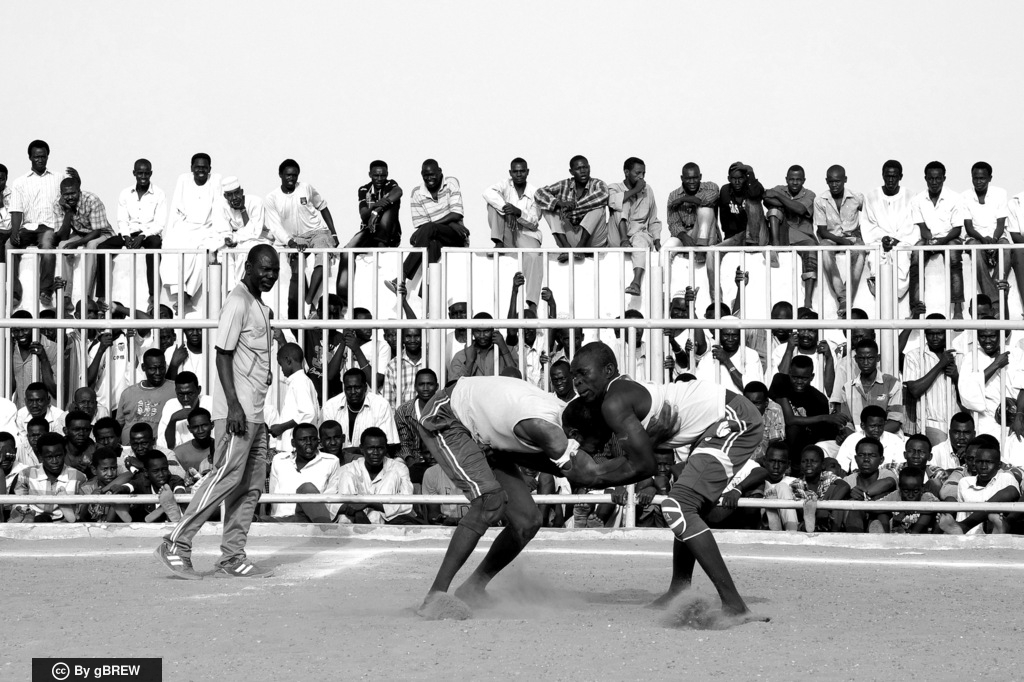
- Nuba wrestling in Bahri, Sudan
- Focus: Wrestling
- Olympic sport: No

Nuba wrestling refers to traditional sports of the Nuba peoples in the Nuba Mountains of South Kordofan state, in southern Sudan.

Nuba wrestling is often accompanied by stick fighting tournaments.

== Techniques ==
The goal of Nuba wrestling is to slam the opponent to the ground. Wrestling is relatively recreational, and serious injuries are rare. Nuba wrestling has no pinning and no submissions. Although there are strikes, these are essentially part of the grappling; in other words, this is not a boxing system, as is, for example, Hausa dambe. Therefore, Nuba wrestling is best viewed as a system of standing grappling, historically practiced naked, but in towns today practiced in T-shirts and shorts.

Nuba stick fighting essentially mimics the movements of fighting with spear and shield. Little armor is worn, so injuries can be severe.

== Training ==
Training for both wrestling and stick fighting includes practicing under the supervision of former champions, performing athletic dances, learning traditional songs, and drinking much milk, while avoiding promiscuity and beer. (Which is prohibited by Islamic Sudanese law.)

== Tournaments ==
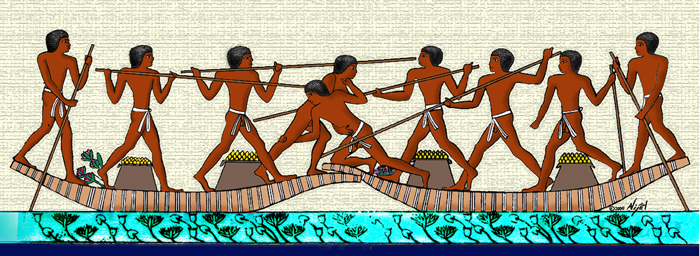
Nuba staff and wrestling warriors, from the tomb of Khnumhotep

In rural areas, Nuba wrestling tournaments are associated with planting and harvest festivals. The purpose of the wrestling at these festivals is to build group identity and display the prowess of the group's young men. (At Nuba wrestling matches, youths represent their villages, rather than themselves.)

Nuba stick fighting tournaments usually take place after harvest. This is partly, because this is the traditional war season, and partly to give thanks for a good harvest. Because stick fighting is dangerous, participants pray before bouts, and amulets may be worn for protection. If a participant is seriously injured, then he or his family are supposed to be compensated by the other village, usually in the form of a cow or similar valuable commodity.

During wrestling and stick fighting tournaments, feasts, music, dance, and storytelling about former champions are integral to the practice. Although stick fighting tournaments are not usually seen in modern cities (police take a dim view of crowds of armed young men roaming the streets), wrestling tournaments are often attended by people living in those same cities to help them retain their sense of cultural identity.

== See also ==
- Index: Nuba peoples
