= Um Heitan =

Village in Sudan

Um Heitan أم حيطان
- Location in Sudan
- Coordinates: 11°29′23″N 30°3′58″E
- Country: Sudan; De facto: New Sudan
- State: South Kordofan
- Time zone: Central Africa Time, GMT + 3

Um Heitan (Arabic: أم حيطان), or Umm Heitan, is a village in Dalami, South Kordofan, Sudan, that is 5 kilometres (3.1 mi) from south of Kadugli, the state capital. The area is an active war zone.

== History ==
In October 2012 and during the Sudanese conflict in South Kordofan and Blue Nile, the Sudan People's Liberation Movement–North defeated the Sudanese Armed Forces (SAF) in Umm Hitan. The battles, which lasted several days, resulted in the complete destruction of the National Congress Party's headquarters in the village and the expulsion of army forces from the region. The fight led to over 50 fatalities and numerous injuries. Several vehicles and weapons were destroyed or seized. Similar attacks were carried out throughout the conflict with the area being captured momentarily by both sides before being recaptured, with the SAF responding with indiscriminate airstrikes. At the end of the conflict the area was controlled by the SAF.

In October 2021, a series of violent attacks by armed individuals on villages in South Kordofan, West Darfur, and South Darfur, including Un Heitan, resulted in seven fatalities, including two children, and injuries to at least five others. The attackers fled the scene immediately after the incident. In response, the local residents formed a group to pursue the attackers, resulting in the retrieval of nine cows. Prior to this, the area had experienced the theft of 29 cows. Similar attack happened in January 2024, leaving 6 dead.

During the on-going Sudanese war that started on 15 April 2023, the Sudan People's Liberation Movement–North (SPLM-N) led by Abdelaziz al-Hilu (SPLM-N El Hilu) has reportedly attacked the Sudanese Armed Forces' (SAF) garrisons in Um Heitan. The SPLM-N El Hilu took control of the garrison and the area since July.

== Demography ==
Um Heitan is known for its ethnic group who speak Koalib, a Niger–Congo language. The population of this group, Umm Heitan people, is likely around 22,000 and they are predominantly Muslim.
