= Werni people =

Sudanese ethnic group

Werni is an ethnic group in the Nuba Hills in South Kurdufan in Sudan. They speak Warnang, a Niger–Congo language, although their dialect is unintelligible to the other three tribal dialects, requiring bilingualism. The population of this group likely is at several thousand.
