= Talodi language =

Talodi language of Sudan

Talodi
- Jomang
- Native to: Sudan
- Region: Nuba Hills
- Ethnicity: Talodi
- Native speakers: (1,500 cited 1989)
- Language family: Niger–Congo?: Atlantic–Congo; Talodi–Heiban; Talodi languages; Talodi

Language codes
- ISO 639-3: tlo
- Glottolog: talo1250
- ELP: Talodi
- Talodi is classified as Critically Endangered by the UNESCO Atlas of the World's Languages in Danger.

Talodi or Jomang (Ajomang, Gajomang) is a Niger–Congo language in the Talodi family spoken in South Kordofan, Sudan. Talodi is spoken in Tasomi and Tata villages (Ethnologue, 22nd edition).

== Grammar ==
=== Noun Classes ===
As most languages of the Talodi Family, it uses noun classes to indicate if the word is in the singular or a plural form. There exist both two-class and one-class gender groups, and in all of them mostly consonant prefixes are used as an indicator. Following is presented the noun class chart of Talodi after Schadeberg (1981: 50–51):

Prefixe(s)	Examples (translated to English)
b-/y-, a-	bird, old man, person, snake, stick, woman/wife,
b-/g-	mountain, tree
w-/m-	guts (~g-/l-)
w-/g-	cow, gazelle
d̪-/r-	dog, fire, horn, liver, mouth, river, road, root, rope, tail, woods, year
d̪-/l-	tongue
d-/l-	clothing
j-/m-	bone, day, egg, finger, fruit, head, heart, star, stone
j-/g-	belly, breast, neck, tooth
s-/ ŋ-	hand, leg
g-/l-	arm, back, branch, ear, feather/wing, guts (~w-/m-), hole, louse, moon/month, nail, nose, old woman, skin, spear, stone, worm
ŋ-/ɲ-	child, eye, fish
b-	rain, smoke
m-	word/language
ḓ-	work
d-	dust (~ŋ-)
r-	food
l-	night
j-	cloud, salt, sun
y-	thing(s)
g-	bark, earth, grass, meat (~ø-), name, sand, sky, wind
ŋ-	blood, dust (~d-), fat, water
ø-	meat (~g-)
