= Fungor people =

Ethnic group of sudan

Fungor
Languages
- Fungor language

Religion
- Islam

The Fungor or Fungs are an ethnic group of Sudan originating from the village of Fungor in the Nuba Mountains. Several thousand members of this ethnic group live in Sudan. They speak Fungor, a Benue-Congo language. Their state of origin is South Kurdufan.

== Culture and society ==
The Fungors mainly engage in agriculture. The most common crops they cultivate are cotton, sorghum, and peanuts.

The Fungors are Muslim.
