= Torona language =

Extinct Niger–Congo language of Sudan

Torona
- Native to: Sudan
- Region: South Kordofan
- Extinct: January 2014, with the death of Karaɽul Alunga Almendi
- Language family: Niger–Congo?: Atlantic–Congo; Talodi–Heiban; Talodi; Tocho languages; Torona

Language codes
- ISO 639-3: tqr
- Glottolog: toro1251

Torona is an extinct Niger–Congo language that was spoken in South Kordofan, Sudan. The last speaker, Karaɽul Alunga Almendi, died in January 2014. Speakers have shifted to Tira. A description of Torona can be found in Norton & Alaki (2016).
