= Keiga Jirru people =

The Keiga Jirru also known as Tese, are a Nuba peoples ethnic group in the Nuba Mountains of South Kordofan state, in southern Sudan. Keiga Jirru live northeast of Kadugli and in 1971 there lived around 1,700 thousand of them.

They speak Tese, in the Nilo-Saharan language family. Keiga Jirru live in the Ambong, Lubung and Tumuro areas and are mostly christian.

== See also ==
- Index: Nuba peoples
