= Moro language =

Niger–Congo language of Sudan

Moro
- Dhimorong
- Native to: Sudan
- Region: South Kordofan
- Ethnicity: Moro Nuba
- Native speakers: 79,000 (2022)
- Language family: Niger–Congo?: Kordofanian; Talodi–Heiban; Heiban; West–Central; Western; Moro
- Dialects: Ulba; Laiyen; Nubwa; Werria; Nderre; Longorban; Thetogovela
- Writing system: Latin

Language codes
- ISO 639-3: mor
- Glottolog: moro1285
- ELP: Moro
- Moro is classified as Definitely Endangered by the UNESCO Atlas of the World's Languages in Danger.

Moro is a Kordofanian language spoken in the Nuba Mountains of South Kordofan, Sudan. It is part of the Western group of West Central Heiban Kordofonian languages and belongs to the Niger-Congo phylum. In 1982 there were an estimated 30,000 Moro-speakers. This was before the second Sudan civil war and therefore the recent number of speakers might differ. There can be noted an influence of Arabic and it is suspected that today approximately a fourth of all Moro vocabulary has a relation or an origin in the Arabic language.

== Phonology ==
There are different intonations in the Moro language. Usually the vowels "e", "a" and "o" have a lower tone, while the vowels "i", "u" and "ʌ" have a higher tone. The vowel "ə" is a Schwa vowel and therefore neutral.

One can find vowel harmony, palatalization of dental stops, resistance to deletion in vowel hiatus resolution and imposition of a partially replaceable tone patterns within the language. However, the latter two are unique to the causative in Moro (9;2,11).

=== Segment Inventory ===
Moro has a seven vowel inventory, schematized in the table below. [ə] can be epenthetic or a reduced version of the peripheral vowels /i e o u/; it also appears in roots with no obvious source of reduction. The behaviour of the schwa [ə] in Moro vowel harmony has been taken as a reason to posit two [ə] vowels in Moro - a higher one that raises vowels, and a lower one that does not.

Vowel inventory
	Front	Central		Back
High	i			u
Mid	e	ə	ʌ	o
Low		a		

In addition, light diphthongs such as [iə], [eə], [oa], and [uʌ] are also attested. Light diphthongs count as a single tone-bearing unit. Vowel length is not contrastive, but lengthening is often observed in open penultimate or root-initial syllable.

The consonantal inventory of Moro is given below.

Consonantal inventory
	Labial	Dental	Alveolar	Retroflex	Palatal	Velar
Stop	p b	t̪ d̪	t d			k g
Affricate					tʃ dʒ	
Fricative	f v	ð	s			
Nasal	m		n		ɲ	ŋ
Trill			r			
Flap			ɾ	ɽ		
Lateral			l			
Glide		w			j	

Consonants can be geminated, with the exception of [ɾ,ɽ,j]. Voiced stops and /v/ are realized as voiceless when geminate.

=== Vowel Harmony ===
Moro has a 'one-step' height vowel harmony system, in which the lower vowels /e a o/ of affixes are raised to their high counterparts [i ʌ u] if the root vowel is high. In addition to root- or stem-controlled harmony, Moro also exhibits a dominant-recessive harmony pattern in which certain extension suffixes trigger raising of preceding prefixes and root vowels, and a following suffix; these harmony-triggering suffixes are the causative -i, applicative -ət̪, and passive -ən.

==== Schwa in Moro Vowel Harmony ====
Some Moro roots containing [ə] trigger vowel harmony, while others do not; similarly, while the applicative and passive suffix both contain [ə] and trigger vowel harmony, Moro exhibits other suffixes containing [ə], such as the antipassive -əđ, which do not. Acoustic studies confirm that the schwas which trigger vowel harmony in Moro show a significantly lower F1 formant than those which do not, and that schwas in raised vowel contexts in Moro also exhibit significantly lower F1 formants than those in non-raised contexts. As such, some scholars argue that Moro includes two schwa vowels: a high schwa, which triggers vowel harmony, and a low schwa, which does not.

== Grammar ==
=== Nouns and Noun Phrases ===
==== Noun Classes ====
Moro can be categorized into 18 noun classes: 8 major, 5 minor and 5 unpaired. Most of these classes have their individual class prefix, singular prefix and concord as well as plural prefix and concord.

Semantic ID	Class prefix	Singular prefix	Singular concord	Plural prefix	Plural concord
people	g/l	?/w	G	L	L
animals/body parts	l/ŋ	L	L	Ñ	Ñ
trees	đ/g	Đ	Đ	W	G
common things	g/n	?	Đ	N	N
Things of shapes	l/ŋ	l/ɽ/ɽr	l/ɽ/ɽr	Ŋ	Ŋ
Long things	đ/r	Đ	Đ	R	R
/	g/n	Đ	Đ	?	G
Large and harmful things	đ/j	Đ	Đ	y	y
Domestic/small animals	ŋ/ŋ	Ŋ-	Ŋ-	Ñ	Ñ
Liquids and abstract nouns	ŋ	Ŋ-	Ŋ-	—N/a	—N/a
Emotions	đ	đ	Đ	—N/a	—N/a
Cow, goat, irregular nouns	r/j	—N/a	r	—N/a	Y
Foreign words	j/j	—N/a	Y	—N/a	y

There are some identified rules for the construction of the plural according to its noun class:

- If the noun starts with either "e, i, o" or "u" and the following is a "đ", those to letters in the plural will form "nđ-"
- If the noun starts with either "e, i, o" or "u" and the following is a "r" or "ɽ", in the plural the vowel will be discarded
- If the noun starts with "ɽ, ɽr" or "lɽr", the first "ɽ" is dropped and the vowel that is inserted in the plural will most likely be "ə"

==== Adjectives ====
Moro language has many compound adjectives, that have their origin in the same root. One can find comparative adjectives as well as superlatives however, these are normally translated in "very, very".

Compound adjectives are formed with a suffix as following:

Gaicia	Bad
Gaiciaŋaiyo	Ugly
Gaicianano	Sad

To construct the comparative of a simple adjective, one must change the last vowel of the adjective into "-ə -" and then add the suffix "-tu":

Gabəco	White
Gabəcətu	Very white

To form the comparative of compound adjectives one must first form the comparative of the first part of the adjective and then add the suffix:

Gamenano	Happy
Gamətunano	Very happy

To construct the superlative there are several opportunities:

- Repeat one or two syllables of the word (in this case, sometimes the vowel of the repeated syllable changes and a "-đ" is added)
  Example: "geđe" (= green) turns into "geđeđe" (=very, very green)
  Example: "gapa" (= light) turns into "gapapeđ" (= very, very light)
- Double a consonant or vowel
  Example: "gafalo" (= low) turns into "gaffalo" (= very, very low) (2.1; 1-2)

==== Pronouns and agreement ====
There are eight Subject pronouns in Moro but each in two different variations. The exact meaning of these variations have not yet been determined.

	Variation 1	Variation 2
I	ñi	Igënəñi
You (singular)	ŋa	Aganəŋa
He/she/it	ŋu	Gënəŋu
We (dual)	Ləŋ	Lëləŋ
We (inclusive)	Nëndr/lëndr	Nëndr
We (exclusive)	Nanda/landa	ñagananda
You (plural)	ñaŋ	ñaganəñaŋ
They	ŋulu	lënəŋulu

Each subject pronoun has its own agreement prefix. These prefixes can vary in accordance to the tense or the aspect of the verb.

In the present and past tense they are attached to the particle "ga" and used as (exemplified with the verb "tu" = "to drink") following:

I	i-	Ñi igatu	I was drinking
You (singular)	a-	Ŋa agatu	You were drinking
He/she/it	/ (concord agreem.)	Ŋu gatu	He was drinking
We (dual)	La-/lə-	Ləŋ lagatu	We were drinking
We (inclusive)	La-/lə-	Nëndr lagatr	We were drinking
We (exclusive)	ña-	Nanda ñagatu	We were drinking
You (plural)	ña-	ñan ñagatu	You were drinking
They	/ (concord agreem.)	Ŋulu latu	They were drinking

The morphophonology changes when the suffix "-r" is added to the end of a verb:

- A verb ending in either "o" or "u" in the past tense will have its vowel replaced by "-r"
- A verb ending in either "e", "a" or "i" will add "-r" to its end

For the future tense the subject prefixes that are mentioned above will are added to the auxiliary of the future verb. The main verb of the future tense has different subject prefixes.

There have been identified following rules:

- The vowel of the subject prefix is dropped if a verb starts with a vowel
- The prefixes for "we dual" and "we inclusive" become "aɽ-" if the verb starts with a "r-" or "ɽ-"
- Compound verbs (to be happy; to be sad etc.) are handled differently

The subject prefix of the future tense is exemplified in the following using the auxiliary "-gidi" and the verb "tu" (to drink):

	Future tense SP	Example	Translation
I	ñi-/ ñe-	Igiđi ñiti	I will drink
You (singular)	ŋa-	Agiđi nati	You will drink
He/she/it	Aŋə-	Giđi aŋəti	He will drink
We (dual)	Alə-	Lagiđi aləti	We will drink
We (inclusive)	Alə + r-	Lagiđr alətr	We will drink
We (exclusive)	ña-	ñagiđi ñati	We will drink
You (plural)	ña-	ñagiđi ñati	You will drink
They	Alə-	Liđi aləti	They will drink

Moro also has a set of eight object pronouns for each tense: In case of the past tense, the object infix will be added to the end of the verb, while in case of the present tense it is inserted between the tense marker "ga" and the verb stem.

	OP Present	OP Past	OP Future
I	Iña	ñe/ ñ i	ñə
You (singular)	ŋa	Aŋa	ŋa
He/she/it	Ma	Ma	Ma
We (dual)	Ndə	Nde	Ndə
We (inclusive)	Ndə	Ndr	Ndə
We (exclusive)	Ndə	Nde	Ndə
You (plural)	Ndə	Nde	Ndə
They	lə	Lo	lə

Also with object pronouns there are some morphophonemic changes:

- Verbs ending in "u" will turn their vowel into "i" (or "w" / "ə" before "aŋa")
- Verbs ending in "o" or "e" will turn their vowel into "ə" (in the case on "aŋa" it disappears)
- Verbs ending in "a" will also drop their vowel in case of "aŋa"

In case of the past tense, the object infix will be added to the end of the verb, while in case of the present tense it is inserted between the tense marker "ga" and the verb stem:

Past tense; verb: "ma" – "gamənde" (= married us)
Present tense; verb: "ma" – "gandəma" (= marries us)
Future tense; verb: "ma" – "giđi aŋəndəme" (= will marry us)

Again, compound verbs are handled slightly differently. While in the present and future tense they can take the same agreements as simple verbs, in the past tense the object pronoun is inserted before the "-alo" or "-ano".

==== Adpositions ====
Researches could identify some pre- and postpositions in the Moro language. The postposition "-ŋa" can be translated to "with" and can be added at least to verbs:

Example: "ŋenŋa nəwujənu" means "talk with parables"

In other cases the prepositions "o-" for singular and "lə-" for plural can express that someone is from a certain place:

Example: "tofəgəlla" (= a place); "otofəgəlla" (= a person from that place); "lətofəgəlla" (= people from that place"

=== Verbs and Verb Phrases ===
==== Tense ====
In Moro there are so far three identified tenses: the past, the present and the future. While the future- and the past tense take tense markers, the future tense comes with an additional auxiliary.

The past tense is usually used at the start of a story and often follows the word "when". Additionally, it describes an action from the past that is still ongoing in the present. If a story is started with the past tense it indicates that other actions of the same time are in the past tense too. The present tense is used to describe actions that happened at the same time as the one before and if the word "when" is used, it changes its meaning to "while". Finally, it describes new situations that have not been there before. The future tense is used for the expression of an intention to do something.

The tense marker for the past tense is "ga" and it comes with little exceptions:

- If the verb starts with a consonant: "ga-" + verb root
- If the verb starts with a vowel: "g-" + verb root
- If the verb starts with "ci", "co" or "j": "gai-" + verb root

Verb root	Verb in past tense	Translation
-tu	Gatu	Drank
-erido	Gerido	Walked
-naico	Ganaico	Gave

For the present tense, the tense marker remains "ga-" but there are more rules regarding the changes of vowels:

- If the verb starts with a consonant: "ga-" + verb root + last vowel changes
- If the verb starts with "i": "ga-" + "b" + ("i" turns into "ə") + verb root + last vowel changes
- If the verb starts with "e", "ë" or "a": "ga-" + "b" + verb root + last vowel changes
- If the verb starts with "w", "u", "o" or "a": "g-" + verb root + last vowel changes
- The changes of the last vowel work according to the following: "e" remains "e"; "i" changes to "ia"; "o" changes to either "a", "ia" or "wa"; "u" changes to either "ia", "a" or "wa"

Verb root	Verb in the present tense	Translation
-tu	Gatia	Drink
-erido	Gaberida	Walk
-naico	ganaica	Give

Within the present tense they are also more rules regarding the compound verbs (to be happy; to be sad etc.). In Moro these verbs end with "-alo" or "-ano" and follow other agreements than simple verbs:

- They do not change their last vowel
- To differ from the past tense, there is a variation in tone in which the past has a high tone and the present has a low tone (here: ´ = high tone; ` = low tone)

Verb root	Past tense	Present tense	Translation
ŋəranano	Gaŋəránano	Gaŋərànano	To be happy
-cianano	Gaiciánano	Gaiciànano	To be sad
-eɽiano	Geɽíano	Geɽìano	To be untrustworthy

The future tense is constructed by using the auxiliary "giđi" which is then followed by the main verb. There are following rules:

- Verbs starting with a consonant other than "ŋ": "aŋə-" + verb root + last vowel changes
- Verbs starting with "n": "a-" + verb root + last vowel changes
- Verbs starting with a vowel: "aŋ-" + verb root + last vowel changes
- The changes of the last vowel work according to the following: "u" becomes "i"; "o" becomes "e"; "a" and "i" remain the same

Verb root	Future tense	Translation
-tu	(giđi) Aŋəti	Will drink
-naico	(giđi) Aŋənaice	Will walk
-erido	(giđi) Aŋeride	Will give

=== Syntax ===
==== Basic constituent order ====
A simple Moro clause consists of the Subject – Verb – Object:

Trwí đʌdəri trʌmbílí.
policeman stops car

The order of a noun phrase is in the order of: Noun – Demonstrative – Numeral – Adjective. Noun classes are common in Niger-Congo languages, especially in Bantu languages like Kikuyu or Swahili.

Nádám	Nətínə	Nəgətfan	Nóré
Books	Those	Two	red

=== Derivational Morphology ===
Within the Moro language, several notations according to (verbal) derivations have been made. So far the following derivational morphemes have been described:

1. Causative: add "-i"
2. Passive/reflexive: "-ən-" + change of the last vowel
  Example: "raico" = to pour; "raicenu" = to be poured
3. Applicative: suffix "ət"
4. Antipassive: "əđ"
5. Repetitive: add the prefix "ka-"
  Example: "arənđo" = to divide; "akarənđo" = to divide many times
6. Simultaneous: add "ta-" to the verb before the concord agreement
7. Narrative/sequential: add "nə-" to the verb before the concord agreement (2.1; 3)
8. Adjective: if "-nano" is added to certain adjectives, they can turn into verbs
  Example: "gaicia" (=bad) + "nano" = gaicianano
9. Locative: use the suffix "e-" or "i-" in accordance with the following vowels
  Example: é-lógopájá = in the cup; í-lútí = in the owl

== Writing system ==
Before the arrival of the first missionaries in 1936, Moro was written with Arabic letters, therefore Latin capital letters were not known by Moro speakers. Missionaries created an orthography including capital letters and also translated the New Testament into Moro in the Ləŋorəban dialect. Today Moro consists of 22 consonants and 7 vowels with one of them being a Schwa.

Moro alphabet
A	B	C	D	Ḏ	Đ/Ꟈ	E	Ë	Ə	F	G	I	J	K	L	M	N	Ñ	Ŋ	O	P	R	Ɽ	S	T	Ṯ	U	W	Y
a	b	c	d	ḏ	đ/ꟈ	e	ë	ə	f	g	i	j	k	l	m	n	ñ	ŋ	o	p	r	ɽ	s	t	ṯ	u	w	y

Đ is typically used in its bowl-struck form, approximately ⟨ꟈ⟩.

== Dialects ==
There are 7 dialects of Moro (Guest 1997a). Ethnologue names are given in parentheses.

- Laiyənia or Layenia (Laiyen)
- Tobəɽelda or Thetogovela (Toberelda, Umm Gabralla)
- Uləba (Ulba)
- Lənəbwa (Nubwa)
- Nḏərria or Ndërria (Nderre)
- Ləmwarəŋ (Dhimorong; = Werria)
- Ləŋorəban (Longorban, Umm Dorein)

Each dialect corresponds to a separate clan, except for Ləmwarəŋ and Ləŋorəban, which are amalgamated into a single clan known as the Wërria. Thus, there is a total of 6 different clans. There is a lexical difference within the dialects, especially with the labials: "t" and "d" or "ɽ" and "t". In other cases, the "b" of the Ləŋorəban dialect is noted as "f, v, w," in other dialects.

Example: "vomit" in the Ləŋorəban dialect is: "biđu", while in other dialects it is: "fiđu" or "wiđu".

There are also significant semantic differences in the dialects.

Example: "majen" in Ləŋorəban means "now" but in other dialect refers to "a long time ago".

This even leads to the fact that speakers of the Tobəɽelda dialect are not able to understand the translation of the New Testament which was translated into the Ləŋorəban dialect. An explanation for this might be, that the speakers of the Ləŋorəban dialect seem to be geographically isolated from speakers of other dialects and receive influence from other languages they are surrounded by such as Katcha or Utundi.
