= Mesakin people =

Total population
- 38,000 (In 1982)

Regions with significant populations
- Sudan South Kordofan

Languages
- Ngile and Dengebu

Mesakin, also known as Ngile, is an ethnic group in the Nuba Hills in Sudan. They speak Ngile and Dengebu, Niger–Congo languages close enough to be considered dialects.
