= Nding language =

Extinct Niger–Congo language of Sudan

Nding
- Eliri
- Native to: Sudan
- Region: Eliri Hills, Mountain Jebel Eliri, South Talodi in the South Kordofan
- Ethnicity: Nding people
- Native speakers: (400 cited 1971)
- Language family: Niger–Congo?: Atlantic–Congo; Talodi–Heiban; Talodi languages; Nding

Language codes
- ISO 639-3: eli
- Glottolog: ndin1245
- ELP: Nding
- Nding is Critically Endangered according to the UNESCO Atlas of the World's Languages in Danger

Nding is an endangered Niger–Congo language in the Talodi family of Kordofan, Sudan. Nding is spoken in the area of the mountain (Jebel) Eliri, on the south of Talodi in South Kordofan, Sudan. Because of that, the language also goes by the name Eliri.

According to the UNESCO “Atlas of the World’s Languages in Danger” from 2010, the language is critically endangered.

== Phonology ==
=== Vowels ===
In the Nding language, exist the following vowels: a, e, i, o, u. Among those a, e, o, can be further classified as long or short, pronunciation-wise.

=== Consonants ===
In the Nding language, appear following consonants: k, g, ṅ, tj, dj, ń, t, d, n, r, l, y, p, b, m, w. Interestingly, the sound “h” is absent in Nding. Consonants can be nasalized by connecting one consonant with n or m; and in some cases, also with their various parallel forms, e.g. ṅg (alternatively ńg/ṅń), ndj (alternatively ṅdj/ńdj), nd, mb. Rarely does one come across such combinations as rn, rb, dr.

The consonant “l” [el] can, and often is, also written as “il”.

=== Consonant and vowel changes ===
Words can change from voiceless to voiced if the preceding word ends with “n”. For example, tetjo [eng. house] in the sentence “the man departs from the house” becomes detjo: babura ako an detjo. Such consonant and vowel changes also seem to happen in an irregular manner, as there is no obvious connection found yet, e.g. tj becomes dj, ti becomes di, ta becomes da.

=== Tonality ===
There is no evidence of tones in Nding.

== Grammar ==
=== Sentence structure ===
The most widespread sentence structure seems to be Subject→Verb→Object, however, the use of Verb→Object→Subject has been documented as well. Personal pronouns come before the verb. Prepositions such as “what” (Nding: yara), “where” (Nding: ča) and “who” (Nding: abura) come at the beginning of the sentence. Important is the fact that the noun doesn't change, no matter its usage, e.g. the noun being a subject/an object/when it comes together with a preposition, has no influence on its form.

=== Nouns ===
Nouns seem to be mostly voiceless, but when they become adjectives, they usually (but not always) become voiced, e.g. p becomes b, tj becomes dj.

==== Genus ====
Gender of a noun is signaled in Nding through prefixes. For more information, see the paragraph below.

==== Plural forms ====
The plural form is created through a change of the initial sound of the noun and it depends on the gender-bound prefix, that the noun possesses. That can mean a change of the prefix or a change of the final position of the word. The before-mentioned categories stand at the core of Meinhof's plural form classification. First, I'll talk about the prefix-changing building of the plural form. There are the following subcategories of these nouns, according to Meinhof:

1. sing. b- pl. y- (e.g. sing. baà pl. ya [eng. a man]) and sing. p- pl. – (e.g. sing. pali pl. ali [eng. a pot])
2. sing. dj- tj- t- pl. m- (e.g. sing. tino pl. mino [eng. a rock, stone])
3. sing. t- pl. r- or n-
4. sing. g- or – pl. ṅ- (attention! sing. ṅu- pl. ṅa-)
5. sing. tje- and – pl. kā-
6. sing. k- pl. –

Now, the other type of plural form, created by a change of the final position, is categorized in the following way:

1. sing. -ak or -k pl. a- or –

Oftentimes vowel changes appear in plural forms too, e.g. nudruba pl. nuduruba [eng. rabbit].

Plural forms can also change their stems and be irregular, e.g. sing. bwai pl. tje [eng. cow/cows].

=== Adjectives ===
The information and data gathered on the topic of adjectives are very limited, and according to Seligmann, in Nding they would be usually replaced with a verbal construction, e.g. instead of saying “no mountain is greater than Eliri” it would be literally translated as “no mountain surpasses Eliri”= ko ma keñe Dayo.

The initial sound of an adjective adapts to the initial sound of the noun, to which it refers to, and they change in their plural forms accordingly. Meinhof divided the adjectival noun-dependent prefixes into 3 categories:

1. sing. b- and p- pl. y- or – (e.g. -abuya [eng. full]→ sing. pali babuya pl. ali yabuya [eng. a full pot/full pots])
2. sing. -ōte [eng. good] (e.g. sing. tjalaṅga djōte pl. malanga mōte [eng. a good leg/good legs]). Here one can also notice how the tj- and dj- prefixes have the same, beforementioned plural prefix form m-
3. -akonda [eng. broken] (e.g. sing. guri kakonda pl. nuri nakonda/e). Attention to exceptions; As one can see, the adjective and the noun in the singular form don’t fit exactly (g and k) but in the plural, they both start with the same letter (n)

=== Case ===
The genitive seems very rare and almost non-existent in the Nding language, however, when it is used, it is put at the end of the phrase unit, just like in Bantu, e.g. ba bura bá Dayo [eng. an Eliri man/a man from Eliri].

=== Numerals ===
Numerals in Nding
Numeral	Nding translation
1	elle
2	eta
3	etak
4	yibinik
5	tjebiṅgela
6	menayelle
7	menayeta
8	menayélak
9	menayíbinik
10	yemeńunok
11	yemeńunok menayella
20	yemenyalok yemenyalok

The numerals 1,2 and 3 with connection to the -mena (see numbers 6, 7, 8) gain an initial sound -y. It is being theorized, that -mena means something like “add”. Additionally, the number 10 (yemeńunok) and the repeated "yemenyalok" in the number 20, are thought to be the same word (ń→ny and u→a).

=== Pronouns ===
==== Personal pronouns ====
Normal personal pronouns: aṅi (I), aṅo (you), aṅo (he), arnaṅo (we), ata (they).

Personal pronouns before the verb: ńi/ṅi/ni (I), aṅo (you), aṅo (he), ṅori/ari (we), ṅorno/ano (you pl.), ṅota/ӑtӑ (she).

Personal pronouns can also conjoin with the verbs and act as suffixes; thus, indicating the subject of the action: -ia/i (I), -wa/o (you), -wa/oba (he), -uria/-ori (we), -ota/-ata (you pl.), -una/-ata (she). When that happens, the stem of the word can change (esp. the vowels a, o, u have a tendency to swap). Nevertheless, there are many ambiguities and contradictions in the data about personal pronouns, so there are still many problems with finding a clear pattern.

==== Possessive pronouns ====
Personal pronouns: i/iṅ/ńe (my/mine), -a (your/yours), -oba (his), -ori (our), -ono/-ai (your/yours), -ano/-ota (her).

==== Interrogative pronouns ====
Interrogative pronouns: abura (who), bi or yara (what), tja (where).

=== Verbs ===
==== Verbal suffixes ====
See the paragraph above on personal pronouns.

==== Negation ====
Negation is accomplished by the use of a post-position ma/nā/nӑ.

==== Imperative form ====
The information about the imperative form is also somewhat unclear, but as one sees in the following example, it has been observed, that there is surely a difference between an imperative in a singular form and in the plural (a suffix -ano is gained in the plural): ŭṅo! (you go!) uṅano! (pl. you go!).

==== Conjugation of the verb "to have" ====
Conjugation of the verb "to have"
Pronoun [eng.]	Nding	Translation
I	bāno/banŏ	"I have"
you	banŏē	"you have"
he	banŏē	"he has"
we	gari	"we have"
you (pl.)	andona	"you (pl.) have"
they	ano andona	"they have"

==== Past tense ====
Exemplary conjugation of a phrase "to break a stick": koñi guri (I broke a stick), koño guri (you broke…), koñoba guri (he broke…), koñori guri (we broke..), koñata guri (you [pl.] broke…), koñata guri (they broke..).

=== Adverbs ===
Adverbs: nĕnna (here), tegu (yesterday).

=== (Pre- and post-)positions ===
Postpositions: ma/nā/nӑ (used for negation).

Prepositions: ra („in“ in a sense, when someone is asking for a location of something), ba („to“), an („from“), nā („at/on“), tuko („outside“), tuka („at/on“ in a sense, when someone asks about location), djeta (“far from”), noṅgotjon (“close to”), tenyagan (“under”), ti/tiaritjo (“in the middle of”).
