= Talodi–Heiban languages =

Proposed branch of Niger–Congo of southern Sudan

Talodi–Heiban
- (disputed)
- Geographic distribution: Nuba Hills, Sudan
- Linguistic classification: Niger–Congo?: (Kordofanian); Talodi–Heiban
- Subdivisions: Talodi; Heiban

Language codes
- Glottolog: None narr1279 Talodi heib1242 Heiban
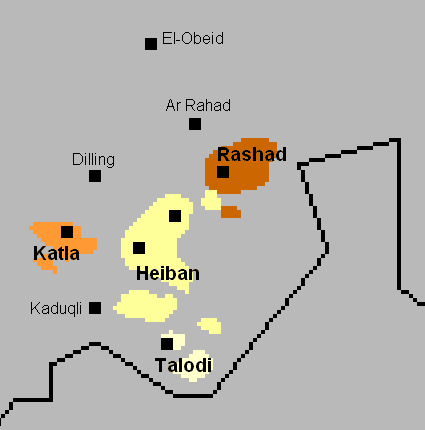

The Talodi–Heiban languages are a proposed branch of the hypothetical Niger–Congo family, spoken in the Nuba Mountains of Sudan. The Talodi and Heiban languages are thought to be distantly related by Dimmendaal, though Glottolog 4.4 does not accept the unity of Talodi–Heiban pending further evidence.

== Classification ==
Roger Blench (2016) notes that the Talodi and Heiban branches share many typological similarities, but few lexical similarities. Blench (2016) considers Talodi and Heiban to each be separate, independent Niger-Congo branches that had later converged due to mutual contact.

Talodi and Heiban had each constituted a group of the Kordofanian branch of Niger–Congo that was posited by Joseph Greenberg (1963); Talodi has also been called Talodi–Masakin, and Heiban has also been called Koalib or Koalib–Moro. Roger Blench notes that the Talodi and Heiban families have the noun-class systems characteristic of the Atlantic–Congo core of Niger–Congo, but that the Katla languages (another putative branch of Kordofanian) have no trace of ever having had such a system, whereas the Kadu languages and some of the Rashad languages appear to have acquired noun classes as part of a Sprachbund, rather than having inherited them. He concludes that the Kordofanian languages do not form a genealogical group, but that Talodi–Heiban is core Niger–Congo, whereas Katla and Rashad form a peripheral branch (or perhaps branches) along the lines of Mande. The Kadu languages may be Nilo-Saharan.

- Talodi–Heiban
  - Heiban
    - East
      - Ko (Fungor, Kau, Nyaro)
      - Warnang (Werni)
    - - Central
        - Kwalib (Koalib, Rere)
        - - Logol (Lukha)
          - Laro–Ebang (Heiban)
          - Utoro (Otoro)
      - Shirumba (Shwai)
      - West
        - Tiro (Tira)
        - Moro
  - Talodi
    - Lumun, †Torona
    - Buram–Saraf
      - Jomang (Talodi), †Nding (Eliri)
      - Tocho
        Tocho (Tacho), Acheron (Asheron)
      - Masakin
        Ngile (Daloka), Dengebu (Dagik)

- † = extinct

Lafofa (Tegem), sometimes classified as a divergent Talodi language, has a different set of cognates with other Niger–Congo and has been placed in its own branch of Niger–Congo.

=== Norton & Alaki (2015) ===
Norton & Alaki (2015: 76, 126) classify the Talodi languages as follows. Proto-Talodi, Proto-Lumun-Torona, and Proto-Narrow Talodi have also been reconstructed by Norton & Alaki (2015).

- Talodi
  - Lumun‑ Torona
    Torona, Lumun
  - Narrow Talodi
    - Tocho, Acheron
    - Dagik
    - Tuwal, Daloka-Aheimar
    - Tasomi-Tata (Talodi), Nding

== Relationship ==
Lexical correspondences between Proto-Heiban and Proto-Talodi according to Blench (2016):

Gloss	Proto-Heiban	Proto-Talodi
belly	*k-aaRi / ɲ-	*C-a[a]rәk / kә-
dry	*Ø-undu / k-	*Øandu[k] / t~k
ear	*k-ɛɛni / ɲ-	*k-ɛ[ɛ]nu / Ø-
fire	*iiga	*t̪-ɪ[ɪ]k / ḷ-
give	*N-d̪ɛ-d̪í	*N-d̪í
guts	*t̪-y / n̪-u	*t-u[u]k / n-
hear	*g-aani / n-	*g-eenu / w-
hole	*li-buŋul / ŋu-	*t-ʊbʊ / n-
horn	*l-uuba / ŋ-	*t~C-uubʊk / n~m-
left side	*t̪-agur	*Ø-ʊgʊlɛ / C-
name	*C-iriɲ	*k-әḷәŋaŋ / N~Ø-
pull	*uud̪i	*aadu
red	*k-ʊʊrɪ	*ɔɔɽɛ
rope	*d̪-aar / ŋw-	*t̪-ɔ[ɔ]ḷәk / ḷ-
small	*-itti(ɲ)	*ɔt̪t̪ɛ(ŋ)
star	*l-ʊrʊm / ŋ-	*C-ɔ[ɔ]d̪ɔt̪ / m
stone	*k-adɔl / y-	*p-әd̪ɔk / m
tongue	*d̪-iŋgәla / r-	*t̪-ʊlәŋɛ / ḷ-
tooth	*l-iŋgat / y-	*C-әɲi[t] / k-
wing	*k-ibɔ / ʧ-	*k-ʊbɪ / Ø-

Noun class prefix comparison between Proto-Heiban and Proto-Talodi according to Blench (2016):

Noun class	Proto-Heiban	Proto-Talodi
Persons	*kʷ,gʷ-/l-	*p,b-/Ø-
Trees and plants	*k,g/y-	*p-/k-
Round things, vital body parts	*li-/ŋʷ-	*ʧ-/m-
Symmetrical body parts	*l-/j-	*ʧ-/k-
Long thin objects, bushy objects	*ð-/r-	*t/n
Small objects, animals	*ŋ-, t-/ɲ-	*ŋ-/ɲ-
Liquids	*ŋ-	*ŋ-
Uncountables, [dust, grass]	*k-	*t-

== See also ==
- Heiban Nuba people
- Talodi people
- List of Proto-Talodi reconstructions (Wiktionary)
- List of Proto-Heiban reconstructions (Wiktionary)

== Notes ==
- Roger Blench. Unpublished. Kordofanian and Niger–Congo: new and revised lexical evidence.
- Roger Blench, 2011, Should Kordofanian be split up?, Nuba Hills Conference, Leiden
- Blench, Roger. 2016. Do Heiban and Talodi form a genetic group and how are they related to Niger-Congo?.
