= Far-Fetched Facts =

Far-Fetched Facts. A Parable of Development Aid
- Hardcover edition
- Author: Richard Rottenburg
- Original title: Weit hergeholte Fakten
- Language: German
- Genre: Non-fiction
- Publisher: MIT Press
- Publication date: 2009
- Media type: Print
- Pages: 280
- ISBN: 978-0-262-18264-5

Far-Fetched Facts is a book by German anthropologist Richard Rottenburg, published in German as Weit hergeholte Fakten in 2002; the English translation was released in 2009.

The book is an ethnography-based, though fictionalized, polyphonic account of a waterworks' improvement project in Tanzania (called Ruritania in the book's fictionalization). The book follows the different stages of the development project by looking closely at the interactions between a Northern development bank, experts of an international consulting firm and African project managers. It focuses thereby on technologies of inscription that enable the reconnaissance and operationalization of improvement measures to be taken, but also guide the overall interaction between the different stakeholders of the project.

Showing these representational and managerial practices, the book lays bare the necessary day-to-day production of objectivity and legitimacy in development projects, but also the intricacies and inconsistencies of daily translation processes, that often lead to the rather disappointing results of such development enterprises.

Inspired by organizational and science and technology studies, “Far-fetched facts” provides an anthropological critique of the aid industry in Africa distinct from postdevelopment critique.

== Reviews ==
- Breyman, Steve 2010. Review of Far-Fetched Facts. In: The History of Science Society, vol. 101, no. 3, pp. 682–683 Retrieved March 13, 2013.
- Evers, Hans-Dieter 2004. Buchbesprechung. Weither geholte Fakten. Eine Parabel der Entwicklungshilfe. In: Zeitschrift für Ethnologie 129, p 167–168 Retrieved March 13, 2013.
- Rosenfelder, Andreas. Es muß umgekrempelt sein. In FAZ December 3, 2002 Retrieved February 6, 2013.

== Links ==
- Book Profil at MIT Press, Retrieved March 13, 2013.

== See also ==
- Science, technology and society
- Postdevelopment theory
- Translation studies
