= Lumun language =

Niger–Congo language of Sudan

Lumun
- Kuku-Lumun
- Native to: Sudan
- Region: Nuba Hills
- Native speakers: 15,000 (2014)
- Language family: Niger–Congo?: Atlantic–Congo; Talodi–Heiban; Talodi; Tocho; Lumun
- Writing system: Latin

Language codes
- ISO 639-3: lmd
- Glottolog: lumu1239
- ELP: Lumun
- Luman is classified as Definitely Endangered by the UNESCO Atlas of the World's Languages in Danger.

Lumun (Lomon), also Kuku-Lumun, is a Niger–Congo language in the Talodi family spoken in the Nuba Mountains, Sudan.

Lumun is spoken in the villages Canya’ru, Toromathan, and To’ri.
