= Koalib language =

Niger–Congo language of Sudan

Koalib
- Kowalib
- Rere
- Native to: Sudan
- Region: Nuba Hills
- Ethnicity: Koalib, Turum, Umm Heitan
- Native speakers: 100,000 (2009)
- Language family: Niger–Congo?: Kordofanian (geographic); Talodi–Heiban; Heiban; Central; Koalib
- Writing system: Latin

Language codes
- ISO 639-3: kib
- Glottolog: koal1240

Koalib (also called Kwalib, Abri, Lgalige, Nirere and Rere) is a Niger–Congo language in the Heiban family spoken in the Nuba Mountains of southern Sudan. The Koalib Nuba, Turum and Umm Heitan ethnic groups speak this language.

== Dialects and locations ==
Koalib dialects and locations (Ethnologue, 22nd edition):

- Nginyukwur dialect: Hadra, Nyukwur, and Umm Heitan
- Ngirere dialect: Abri area
- Ngunduna dialect: Koalib hills area
- Nguqwurang dialect: Turum and Umm Berumbita

== Phonology ==
=== Consonants ===
		Labial	Alveolar	Retroflex	Palatal	Velar	
		Labial	Alveolar	Retroflex	Palatal	plain	lab.
Plosive	voiceless	p	t	ʈ	c	k	kʷ
Plosive	voiced/imp.	b	d	ᶑ	ɟ		
Plosive	prenasal	ᵐb	ⁿd	ᶯɖ	ᶮɟ	ᵑɡ	ᵑɡʷ
Fricative		f			ʃ		
Nasal		m	n		ɲ	ŋ	ŋʷ
Rhotic			r	ɽ			
Approximant			l		j	w	

- The voiced retroflex equivalent is an implosive sound [ᶑ] rather than a standard plosive [ɖ].
- Gemination occurs among plosive, nasal, liquid and approximant sounds.
- Sounds /f, t, ʃ, k, kʷ/ in intervocalic or pre-consonantal position can be heard as voiced [v, ð, ʒ, ɡ, ɡʷ]. In post-consonantal position, /f, t, ʃ, k/ are heard as [v, ð, ʒ, ɡ].
- In final position, sounds /ɟ, f/ are heard as [c, p].
- Sounds /p, t, ʈ, c, k, kʷ/ in intervocalic position can be heard as tense [pː, tː, ʈː, cː, kː, kːʷ].

=== Vowels ===
	Front	Central	Back
Close	i		u
Close-mid	e		o
Open-mid	ɛ	ɐ	ɔ
Open		a	

== Writing system ==
Capital and small at letters in Doulos SIL typeface

It is written using the Latin script, but includes some unusual letters. It shares a tailed R (Ɽ) with other Sudanese languages, and uses a letter resembling the at sign (@) for transcribing the letter ع in Arabic loanwords. The Unicode Standard includes R WITH TAIL at code points U+027D (lowercase) and U+2C64 (uppercase), but the Unicode Consortium in 2004 declined to encode the at sign separately as an orthographic letter due to lack of evidence of use.

SIL International maintains a registry of Private Use Area code points in which U+F247 represents LATIN SMALL LETTER AT, and U+F248 LATIN CAPITAL LETTER AT. However, they have marked this PUA representation as deprecated since September 2014, and the current version of their corporate PUA character assignments package recommends using U+24D0 ⓐ CIRCLED LATIN SMALL LETTER A and U+24B6 Ⓐ CIRCLED LATIN CAPITAL LETTER A for that letter instead.

== Publications ==
The New Testament was published in Koalib in 1967.
