= Heiban language =

Niger–Congo language spoken in Sudan

Heiban
- Ebang
- Native to: Sudan
- Region: Nuba Hills
- Ethnicity: Heiban Nuba
- Native speakers: (4,000 cited 1984)
- Language family: Niger–Congo?: Kordofanian; Talodi–Heiban; Heiban; Central; Laro–Ebang; Heiban
- Writing system: Latin

Language codes
- ISO 639-3: hbn
- Glottolog: heib1243
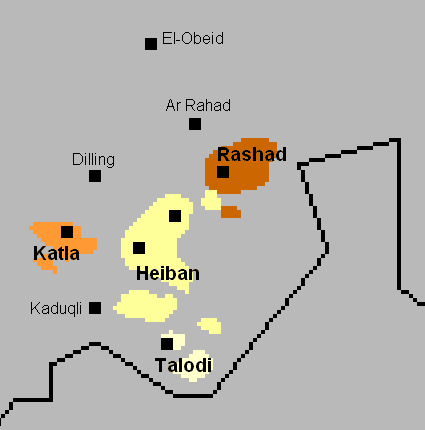
- Heiban

- Heiban is classified as Vulnerable by the UNESCO Atlas of the World's Languages in Danger.

The Heiban language, Ebang, or Abul, is a Niger–Congo language in the Heiban family spoken in the town of Heiban located in the Nuba Mountains of Kordofan, Sudan.

== Orthography ==
| a | b | ɓ | c | d | dh | ɗ | e | f | g | h | i | j | k | kh | l | m |
| n | ny | ŋ | o | ɔ | p | r | ɽ | s | t | th | u | ū | v | w | y | z |

== Grammar ==
=== Nouns ===
The earliest record of the Heiban noun class system was composed by Stevenson (1956/57), in which he classified each noun class into two sections, the first being for singular form and the second for plural form. Each noun class has an indicative prefix. The separation of noun classes occurs due to the nouns belonging to a certain category. Guest (1997) further contributed to the findings of Stevenson by discovering more classification for nouns.

| Noun Class | Singular Prefix | Plural prefix | Semantic identification |
|---|---|---|---|
| 1,2 | kw-/gw- ku-/gu- (∅) | l- li-/lu- li- | People, animal and nature except trees |
| 1,2 | (∅) | ŋa (suffix) | Relatives |
| 3,4 | Kw-/gw- Ku-/gu- | j-/(∅) ji-/ju-/(∅) | Trees |
| 5,6 | l- | ŋ-/nw- | Sets |
| 7,8 | k-/g- | j-/(∅) | Common things |
| 9,10 | dh- | d-/r- | Long. thin things |
| 11,12 | dh- | j-/(∅) | Large and dangerous things |
| 13,14 | k-/g- | Ny- | Hallow and deep things |
| 15,16 | ŋ- | ny- | Domestic and small animals and things |
| 20 | ŋ- | - | Liquids and abstract nouns |
| 21,22 | ŋ- | j- | Goat |
| 25,26 | (∅) | j- | Words beginning with a vowel |

=== Pronouns ===
Pronouns in Heiban are categorised as 'free pronouns' or 'bound pronouns'. Early recordings of the language, such as in the work of Guest (1997) only went as far as to mention free pronouns.

| | Subject pronoun (stand- alone) | Object Infix |
|---|---|---|
| 1st person singular | nyi | -nyi |
| 2nd person singular | ŋa | -aŋa |
| 3rd person singular | ŋeda | -nyi |
| 1st person dual | daŋa | -ilo |
| 1st person plural | Anaŋa/alŋa | -ilo |
| 2nd person plural | ŋaŋa | -ji |
| 3rd person plural | ŋidiŋa | -ilo |

Guest further notes that in Heiban, an object or an animal may not be referred to with the 3rd person subject pronouns alone, but with the object suffix. Bound pronouns are morphemes in a verbal complex that refer to some participant but are not class specific.

| | Initial | Medial | Final | Syntactic function |
|---|---|---|---|---|
| 1st person singular | nyi- | -inyi- | -iny | Subject and object |
| 2nd person singular | ŋa- | -aŋa- | -aŋa | Subject and object |
| 3rd person singular | ŋwu- | -uŋwu- | -uŋw | Always subject |
| 1st person plural inclusive subject | Al- | | | Subject |
| 1st person plural exclusive subject | ana- | -ana- | -ana | Subject |
| 1st person plural object | ji- | -iji- | -ije | Object |
| 2nd person plural subject | nya- | -anya- | -anya | Subject |
| 2nd person plural object | ŋaji- | -a(i)ji- | -aje | Object |
| Plural | Al- | -il- | -lo | ? |
| Plural Adresse | | | -ul | Plural adresse |

Bound pronouns for 1st and 2nd person have specific forms to represent subject and object. In singular form, the subject and object may be identical in spelling but are assumed to have pronunciation differences. There is also a 1st person plural exclusive and inclusive for subject forms. Furthermore, there is a pronoun for 3rd person singular which is free of reference to any particular class.

=== Numbers ===
| base numeral | | +10 | |
| 1 | gwetipo | 11 | die a gwepito |
| 2 | ram | 12 | die a ram |
| 3 | thiril | 13 | die a thiril |
| 4 | koriŋo | 14 | die a koriŋo |
| 5 | thudhna | 15 | die a thudhna |
| 6 | nyiril | 16 | die a nyiril |
| 7 | koriŋo a thiril | 17 | die a koriŋo a thiril |
| 8 | dubaŋ | 18 | die a dubaŋ |
| 9 | thudhina a koriŋa | 19 | die a thudina a koriŋo |
| 10 | die | 20 | dhure |

Beyond 20, the numbers proceed to 200 in a similar manner as the teens, with only the word denoting the power of 10 changing.

== Relevant sources ==
- Rose, Sharon. 2023. "Inalienable possessives in two Heiban languages". Paper presented at the Annual Conference on African Linguistics 54, University of Connecticut.
