= Lugol =

Lugol may refer to:

- Jean Guillaume Auguste Lugol (1786-1851) - French doctor
- Lugol's iodine, a solution of iodine in potassium iodide, named after J. G. A. Lugol.
