= Tiro language =

Atlantic–Congo language of Sudan

Tiro
- Zittiro
- Lithiro
- Native to: Sudan
- Region: Nuba Hills
- Ethnicity: Tira
- Native speakers: 34,000 (2022)
- Language family: Niger–Congo?: Kordofanian; Talodi–Heiban; Heiban; West; Tiro
- Writing system: Latin

Language codes
- ISO 639-3: tic
- Glottolog: tira1254

Tiro, also Thiro or Tira, is a Niger–Congo language in the Heiban family spoken in South Kordofan, Sudan.
