= Laro language =

Atlantic-Congo language

Laro
- Native to: Sudan
- Region: Nuba Hills
- Ethnicity: Laro
- Native speakers: 40,000 (2010)
- Language family: Niger–Congo?: Atlantic–Congo; Talodi–Heiban; Heiban; Central Heiban; Laro–Ebang; Laro

Language codes
- ISO 639-3: lro
- Glottolog: laro1243
- ELP: Laro
- Laro is classified as Definitely Endangered by the UNESCO Atlas of the World's Languages in Danger.

Laro, also Laru, Aaleira, Ngwullaro, Yillaro, is a Niger–Congo language in the Heiban family spoken in the Nuba Mountains in Kordofan, Sudan.

Villages are Oya, Rodong (Hajar Medani), Hajar Baco, Gunisaia, Serif, Tondly, Reli, Lagau (Serfinila), Getaw (Hajar Tiya), and Orme (Ando).

"Laru [lro] is a Niger-Kordofanian language in the Heiban group that includes the languages Heiban, Moro, Otoro, Kwalib, Tira, Hadra, and Shoai. The three main dialects of Laru are Yilaru, Yïdündïlï and Yogo'romany. The last two are close to the neighbouring language of Kwalib, and the intelligibility between them is high. This presentation is based on the first dialect—Yilaru."

== Phonology ==
=== Consonants ===
Consonant phonemes
| | | bilabial | dental | alveolar | palatal | velar | labialised velar |
|---|---|---|---|---|---|---|---|
| nasals | | m | | n | ɲ | ŋ | (ŋʷ) |
| plosives | voiceless | p | t | t | c | k | (kʷ) |
| plosives | voiced | b | d | ɖ | ɟ | ɡ | (gʷ) |
| plosives | prenasalized | ᵐb | ⁿd | | ᶮɟ | ᵑɡ | (ᵑgʷ) |
| approximants | | w | | l | j | | |
| flap | | | | ɽ | | | |
| trill | | | | r | | | |

There are five locations in the mouth where speech sounds are produced: specifically at the lips (bilabial), against the teeth (dental), on the ridge behind the upper front teeth (alveolar), on the hard palate (palatal), and at the back of the mouth against the soft palate (velar). The consonants in this language can be categorized into 10 obstruents (consonants with a constriction of airflow), four nasals (consonants produced with airflow through the nose), three approximants (consonants produced with minimal constriction), and two rhotics (consonants with a quality similar to the English "r"). These categories are outlined in Table 1 according to Abdalla and Stirtz (2005). It is noteworthy that labialized consonants, occurring exclusively in prefixes, are enclosed in parentheses.

=== Vowel ===
Vowel insertion
| a | ɡ-ɲɛ̀n → ɡˈɪɲɛ̀n | 'CM-dog' |
| b | ɡ-bəɽu → ɡˈbəɽu | 'CM-cloud' |
| c | ɡ-ɛn → ɡɛn | 'CM-mountain' |

Laru has an 8-vowel system. The vowels are presented in two sets in Table, where [ɪ ɛ a ɔ ʊ] are [-ATR] and [i ə u] are [+ATR].

Only vowels with the same [ATR] value can occur together in the same root word. The [+ATR] vowel quality is dominant in Laru, spreading to both prefixes and suffixes from both noun and verb roots, as well as spreading from verb suffixes to the root.

==== Vowel elision ====
The language exhibits a linguistic phenomenon known as "vowel elision". Vowel elision occurs when two vowels are joined together through affixation, which means adding a prefix or suffix to a word. The language does not allow vowel sequences, which means that two vowels cannot appear next to each other in a word. To prevent a sequence of two vowels from occurring, the first of the two vowels is elided, which means it is deleted or omitted from the word.

Examples of vowel elision:

- daɽɪ - ala → daɽala 'on the tree'
- ɡʊlʊ - ala → ɡʊlala 'on the fence'

This process of vowel elision often occurs in connected speech as a way of simplifying pronunciation and facilitating smoother transitions between words. It is a common phonological phenomenon in many languages.

- In this case, the vowel "ɪ" from the first word "daɽɪ" is elided when it combines with the second word "ala".
- The vowel "ʊ" from the first word "ɡʊlʊ" is elided when it combines with the second word "ala".

These examples demonstrate the phenomenon of vowel elision, where a vowel is dropped or omitted to facilitate smoother pronunciation in connected speech.

== Grammar ==
=== Locatives ===
Locatives
| Locative | Gloss | Meaning |
|---|---|---|
| -ala | 'on.above' | above the ground level |
| -alu | 'on.level' | on the ground level |
| -anʊ | 'under, inside' | under the ground level, inside |
| nɔnɔ | 'around' | around the ground level |

- The locatives -ala and -alʊ specify positions above and on the ground level, respectively.
- The locative -anʊ denotes being under the ground level or inside something.
- The locative nɔnɔ indicates a position around the ground level.
- These locatives offer a way to express and understand spatial relationships and locations within the language.

Locatives describe the position or location of objects within the language. Locatives play a crucial role in describing the position or location of objects within the language. The following table presents three locative enclitics and one unbound locative word, each serving to convey different spatial relationships. These locatives are attached to various word categories to provide specific information about the placement or orientation of objects in the linguistic context.

=== Noun classes ===
Noun classes
| Class | Class markers | Singular | Plural | Gloss | Semantic area |
|---|---|---|---|---|---|
| 1-2 | d-/ŋʷ- | dìɟì | ŋʷùɟì | person | big things |
| 3-4 | l-/ŋʷ- | lə̀blə̀ⁿdí | ŋʷə̀blə̀ⁿdí | rifle | hollow, round things |
| 5-6 | ɡ-/j- | ɡìɟì | jìɟì | child | small, thin, long, pointed things |
| 7 | j- | jáʷ | | water | liquids, abstract things |
| 8-9 | -0/-ŋə | mə́ | mə̀ŋə́ | grandmother | relational terms |

The Laru language employs a sophisticated noun class system with nine classes, categorizing nouns into five distinct semantic areas, as outlined in Table 4. The first two classes are designated for substantial entities, encompassing individuals, trees, and animals. Moving to the third and fourth classes, the focus shifts to objects characterized as hollow or round. Classes five and six are designated for diminutive entities, referring to items that are small, thin, long, or pointed. The seventh class encompasses nouns related to liquids and abstract concepts or ideas. Lastly, the eighth and ninth classes are devoted to relational nominals, including pronouns and terms related to kinship.

=== Noun roots ===
The table shows minimal and contrastive pairs of noun roots in Laru language.

Noun roots
| vowels | Laru | English | Laru | English |
|---|---|---|---|---|
| ɪ-ɛ | d-ìl | 'horn' | d-ɛ̀l | 'well' |
| | dˈ-ɽɪ́ | k.o.stick | g'-ɽɛ́ | 'k.o.tree' |
| | d-ìrà | 'lion' | g-ɛ̀rá | 'girl' |
| | g-ìlíɲ | 'k.o.mushroom' | d-ɛ̀lɛ́ɲ | 'chief' |
| | d'-l:í | 'shoulder' | ǀˈ-ǀːɛ́ | 'grinding stone' |
| ɛ-a | j-ɛ̀n | 'mountains' | j-àn | 'milk' |
| | g'-ɽɛ̀ | 'tree' | gˈ-ɽà | 'head' |
| | ɡ-ɛ̀rá | 'girl' | g-ɛ̀rɛ́ | 'sky' |
| | d-ɔ̀rɛ́ | 'basket' | d-ɔ̀rá | 'anus' |
| | g-ɔ̀ɽɛ̀ | 'shelter' | g-ɔra | 'k.o.wood' |
| a-ɔ | j-àn | 'milk' | j-ɔn | 'grain' |
| ɔ-ʊ | d-ɔ̀ɽá | 'thresher' | d-ʊ̀ɽà | 'winder' |
| | d-ɔ̀rá | 'anus' | d-ʊ̀rà | 'magic stick' |
| | g-ɔ̀bɔ̀ | 'temple' | g-ʊ̀bʊ̀ | 'compound' |
| | g-ɔ̀ʈà | 'k.o.fruit' | g-ʊ̀dá | 'k.o.fruit' |
| | g-ɔ̀ɲ | 'thing | g-ʊ̀ɲ | 'veranda' |
| ɪ -i | d-ìrìɲ | 'waist | d-ìrìɲ | 'boar' |
| a-ə | d-àmà | 'locust' | d-ə̀mə̀ | 'wound' |
| | d-ádáɲ | 'knife' | d-ə́də́ɲ | 'cave lizard' |
| | g-áɲá | 'grass' | d-ə̀ɲə̀ | 'vegetables' |
| | d'-ráɲ | 'k.o.grass' | dˈ-rə́ŋ | 'seal of bee' |
| | g'-ɽà | 'head' | g'-ɽə́ | 'bird' |
| ʊ -u | g'-lʊ̀ | 'clay | d'-lù | 'smoke' |
| | g'ɟʊ̀r | 'stream' | d'-ɟúr | 'rock' |
| | g'-bʊ̀ŋ | 'hole in tree' | g'-bùŋ | 'pool' |
| | d-ʊ̀wà | 'buffalo' | d-úwə́ | 'moon' |
| | g-úwá | 'root' | g-úwə́ | 'he-goat' |

=== Affixes of nouns ===
The possible prefixes, suffixes and enclitics on nouns are shown in Table.

Affixes of nouns
| Direction marker | Class marker | | Accuative marker | Locative |
|---|---|---|---|---|
| ɡ- | d- | Root | -ɲ | -ala |
| ⁿd- | ɡ- | | -u | -alʊ |
| | ŋʷ- | | | |
| C length | l- | | | -anʊ |
| | j- ŋʷ- | | | |

=== Verbs ===
==== Affixes of verbs ====
These tables provide insights into various aspects of verb morphology in the language, encompassing subject agreement, finite markers, derivational morphemes, and locative enclitics. They offer a comprehensive view of how verbs are structured and used, serving as valuable information for linguists or learners interested in understanding the language's grammatical features.

- Finite markers provide information about the type of action, whether it is continuous, perfective, or in the default form.
- Derivational morphemes add various nuances to the verbs, such as reflexiveness, passiveness, manipulative actions, reciprocity, directive actions, simultaneous actions, repetitive actions, and causation.
- Locative enclitics provide information about the location or direction of the action.

Affixes of verbs
| Subject agreement | | Finite markers | Derivational morphemes | Locative enclitics |
|---|---|---|---|---|
| ɡ- | ROOT | -di(transitive continuative) | -nɪ (REF) | -ala 'on.above' |
| ɡʷ- | | -ti(transitive perfective) | ni (PASS) | -alu 'on.level' |
| l- | | -u(default) | -ɟɪ (MAN) | -anu 'inside, under' |
| ŋʷ- | | | -dɪ (REC) | |
| d- | | | -cɪ (DIR) | |
| | | | -tɪ (SIM) | |
| | | | -ʈɪ (REP) | |
| | | | -jɪ (CAU) | |

==== Derived verb forms ====
This table illustrates derived verb forms in the language, including various suffixes and their functions. Each row provides examples of infinitive verb glosses and their corresponding derived verb glosses after applying the specified suffixes.

Derived verb forms
| Suffix | Function | Infinitive verb | Gloss | Derived verb | Gloss |
|---|---|---|---|---|---|
| -nɪ | reflexive (REF) | èŋɡá | 'to see' | èŋɡà-nɪ́ | 'to look at oneself' |
| -ni | passive (PASS) | lɛ̀ŋɛ́ | 'to know' | lɛ̀ŋɛ̀-ní | 'to be known' |
| -ɟɪ | manipulative (MAN) | rʊ́ | 'to be' | rʊ̀-ɟɪ́ | 'to make to be' |
| -dɪ | reciprocal (REC) | pí | 'to beat' | pɪ̀-dɪ́ | 'to fight each other' |
| -cɪ | directive (DIR) | màní | 'to cook' | mànɪ̀-cɪ́ | 'to cook for someone' |
| -ti | simultaneous (SIM) | lʊ́ | 'to dig' | lʊ̀-tí | 'to dig' |
| -ʈi | repetitive (REP) | ùɽí | 'to cut' | ùɽì-ʈí | 'to cut several times' |
| -jɪ | causative (CAU) | rɪ̀tɪ́ | 'to play' | rɪ̀tɪ̀-jɪ́ | 'to cause something to play' |

- The table demonstrates the versatility of these derivational suffixes in altering the meaning of verbs.
- Each suffix introduces a specific semantic function, such as reflexiveness, passiveness, manipulative actions, reciprocity, directive actions, simultaneous actions, repetitive actions, and causation.
- These derivational forms contribute to the expressiveness and precision of the language, allowing speakers to convey a wide range of nuanced actions and relationships between actions.
