= Fungor language =

Niger–Congo language spoken in Sudan

Fungor
- Ko
- Native to: Sudan
- Region: South Kordofan
- Ethnicity: Fungor
- Native speakers: (2,700 cited 1984)
- Language family: Niger–Congo?: Atlantic–Congo; Talodi–Heiban; Heiban; East Heiban; Fungor
- Dialects: Ko; Nyaro

Language codes
- ISO 639-3: fuj
- Glottolog: kooo1244
- ELP: Ko

The Fungor language, Ko (Kau) or Nyaro, is a Niger–Congo language of the Heiban family spoken in Kordofan, Sudan.
