= Laro (name) =

Laro can be a masculine given name or a surname. Notable people with the name include:

== Given name ==
- Laro Gómez (born 2006), Spanish football goalkeeper
- Laro Herrero (born 1990), Spanish snowboarder
- Laro Setién (born 1995), Spanish football midfielder

== Surname ==
- David Laro (1942–2018), American judge
- Gordon Laro (born 1972), American former football player

== See also ==
- Gene Rondo (1943–1994), Jamaican reggae singer, sometimes credited as Gene Laro or Winston Laro
