= Otoro Nuba people =

Ethnic group in southern Sudan

The Otoro Nuba are an ethnic group in the Nuba Mountains of South Kordofan state, in southern Sudan. The name refers to the ethnic unit which Nuba people call themselves. Otoro meaning "Hill People". They speak the Otoro language, a Niger-Congo language. They are very close to the Heiban tribe and they both live in the South of Nuba mountains between Delami and Talodi and can understand the language of one another.

Members of this ethnic group are mostly Christians.

On 13 May 2026, 61 civilians were killed when the rebel group Sudan People's Liberation Movement–North (SPLM-N) currently led by Abdelaziz al-Hilu clashed with members from the Otoro tribe near Kauda, South Kordofan. The conflict had stemmed from Otoro tribesmen removing land boundary markers which lead to a confrontation between the Otoro and Shawaya tribes.

== See also ==
- Nuba peoples
