= Logol language =

Niger–Congo language of Kordofan, Sudan

Logol
- Lukha
- Native to: Sudan
- Region: Nuba Hills
- Ethnicity: Logol
- Native speakers: 13,000 (2022)
- Language family: Niger–Congo?: Kordofanian; Talodi–Heiban; Heiban; Central; Logol
- Writing system: Unwritten

Language codes
- ISO 639-3: lof
- Glottolog: logo1262
- ELP: Logol
- Logol is classified as Severely Endangered by the UNESCO Atlas of the World's Languages in Danger.

Logol, or Lukha, is a Niger–Congo language in the Heiban family spoken in the Nuba Mountains of South Kordofan, Sudan.
