= Otoro language =

Language spoken in Sudan

Otoro
- Ḏuṯuɽu
- Native to: Sudan
- Region: Nuba Hills
- Ethnicity: Otoro Nuba
- Native speakers: 17,000 (2023)
- Language family: Niger–Congo?: Atlantic–Congo; Talodi–Heiban; Heiban; Central; Ebang–Logol; Otoro
- Dialects: Dorobe; Dogoridi; Dugujur; Dukwara
- Writing system: Latin

Language codes
- ISO 639-3: otr
- Glottolog: otor1240
- ELP: Otoro
- Otoro is classified as Severely Endangered by the UNESCO Atlas of the World's Languages in Danger.

The Otoro language is a Heiban language which belongs to the Kordofanian Languages and therefore it is a part of the Niger-Congo language family. In a smaller view the Otoro is a segment of the "central branch" from the so-called Koalib-Moro Group of the languages which are spoken in the Nuba Mountains. The Otoro language is spoken within the geographical regions encompassing Kuartal, Zayd and Kauda in Sudan. The precise number of Otoro speakers is unknown, though current sources suggest it to be exceeding 17,000 people.

Otoro is transcribed here using the community orthography, using the International Phonetic Alphabet (IPA). However, some similar sounds are not further distinguished and represented as one. Therefore, the sounds 'ɪ', 'i' and 'ɪ̈' will be collectively denoted as 'i', 'a' and 'ɑ' as 'a', 'ɔː' and 'ɔ' as 'ɔ', 'o' and 'o̜' as 'o' and 'u' and 'ʊ' as 'u'.

== Name ==
To outsiders, the language is called "Otoro". The local name of the language is "Dhitoɽo". Otoro speakers are referred to as "Litoɽo" (plural) and the area is called "Otoɽo".

== Language varieties ==
Otoro shows linguistic diversity through the presence of three primary varieties, each named after the respective mountain ranges within which these linguistic variations are observed.

The Kwara variety is the most prominently represented in the Otoro language, on which Stevenson's book Tira and Otoro is based. Furthermore, in the Kwara mountain group, the town of Sabun, known as the home of the Mek, holds a high political status as Mek denotes the chief of the Otoro.

The native speakers on the hill chains Kijama and Kwijur use remarkably similar varieties. Consequently, in this article it is viewed as one and introduced as the Kwijur variety.

The third vernacular is the Orombe variety. It is used in the Orombe and Girindi hills. Linguistically the Orombe variety has similarities of both the Kwara and Kwijur variety.

== Phonology ==
This section is based on all the Otoro varieties and covers Vowels, Consonants, Stress and intonation.

=== Vowels ===
The three Otoro varieties utilize a system of thirteen vowels rendered in a narrow phonetic transcription: i, ɪ, e, ɛ, a, ɑ, ɔ, o̜, o, u, ʊ, ö, ə. In a more comprehensive script, 'i' will also cover 'ɪ' and ˈɪ̈ˈ, 'a' will cover both 'a' and 'ɑ', 'u' will include 'ʊ' and 'o' will also involve 'o̜', resulting in a total of nine primary vowels.

Vowels
	Front	Central	Back	
	short	Short	short	Long
Close	i		u	
Close	ɪ	ɪ̈	ʊ	
Close-mid	e	ö	o	
Close-mid			o̜	
Open-mid	ɛ	ə	ɔ	ɔː
Open	a		ɑ	

==== Vowel Change ====
It is known that vowel changes are not only present but also play a crucial role in verb conjugation. In general, vowel change needs further exploration within the Otoro context.

=== Consonants ===
The following table shows all the noted consonants in the Otoro varieties.

	Bilabial	Labiodental	Dental	Alveolar (retroflex)	Palatal	Velar
Plosive	p, b		th, dh	t,d	c,j	k, g
Implosive			ɗ			
Fricative	ʋ	v	ð			
Affricates			tr, dr			
Nasal				n	ny	ŋ
Liquids, etc.			ɽ	l, r	y	w

Several of the consonants mentioned in the table exhibit peculiarities. For instance, the bilabial fricative 'ʋ' is absent in the Kwijur variety and appears merely as a variant of 'm' or 'v' in the Kwara variety. On the country, affricates occur solely in the Kwijur variety. Regarding closed syllables, the majority conclude in a nasal or liquid consonant. In the Kwara variety one will see the nasal 'ny'/'ŋ' far less than in the other two varieties. In general, affricates, plosives, the fricatives 'ʋ' and 'v' and implosives may not be syllable-final.

==== Consonant combinations ====
In Otoro, the language employs compounds involving the semi-vowel 'w' along with dentals, liquids and nasals. However, not all the dialects share the same set of combinations.

Compounds with liquids:

These are first incountered in Orombe and Kwijur.

'lr', 'lrk', 'lrkw', 'lɽ', 'ld', 'lð', 'ldr', 'lth', 'dr', 'ŋɽ', 'rn', 'rk', 'rkw'

English Kwara Kwijur Orombe

Hill ldori lrɔgɔm lrɔgwɔm

The compounds with nasals:

These are mostly present in Kwijur.

'ŋɽ', 'ŋw', 'mb', 'nd', 'ŋg',...

English Kwara Kwijur Orombe

Rifle, gun almudu almundu almudu

Compound with semi-vowel 'w':

These are found in every Otoro variety.

'kw', 'gw', 'ŋw'

English Kwara Kwijur Orombe

Fly kwal kwalum kwal

=== Stress and Intonation ===
Stress and the emphasis of louder or stronger sounds are commonly used in the Otoro language. However, words which are only determined by tone are rare. A distinct pattern of the stress in this language has not yet been established, although Stevenson says that the stress often falls on the last syllable. In instance, where a word has a final consonant, the stress typically occurs on the last syllable. Conversely, many dissyllabic words tend to stress on the first syllable.

Example (stress syllable marked ' )
English	Kwara	Kwijur	Orombe
buttock	'gwutu	'gwuthu	'gwutu
many	gwu'tu	gwu'tu	gwu'tu
to open	'iðu	'iðu	'iðhu
head	l'ɽa	l'ɽa	l'ɽa

== Morphology ==
Otoro is an agglutinative language which means it is a type of language characterized by adding affixes to the root or stem of a word. Also, Otoro does not have a grammatical gender, but does have noun classes. The etymological roots primarily manifest as monosyllabic or dissyllabic structures. The syllables primarily contain either a vowel-consonant pairing or a vowel combined with a sequence of consonants. Syllables in this language are mostly open but specific consonants may form a closed syllable, characterized by a short vowel ending. This structure is notably more frequent in the Kwijur and Orombe varieties as compared to the Kwara variety. The nouns in Otoro are grouped in twelve noun-classes, with specific prefixes employed to construct the noun and differentiate between singular and plural. The layout in these prefixes is unique to each class. To achieve agreement with the noun, verbs and qualificatives employ concord prefixes. Those concord prefixes depend on the specific noun-classes and mirror the prefixes used for the corresponding noun within the same noun class. This pattern is recognized as "alliterative concord ". Personal names, kinship terms, and pronouns employ collective suffixes for the purpose of pluralization.

=== Nouns ===
As mentioned before, Otoro nouns fall into twelve different classes, each with its own clear distinctions. This classification system is quite transparent and forms a construction. The noun-classes are marked both numerically and through given titles, to make an approach to understanding the classifications better. The designations corresponding to each class are displayed in the chart below. In each noun-class of Otoro, every noun is assigned at least two prefixes, distinctly indicating whether the word is in its singular or plural form. In the chart below the concord prefixes which come with verbs and qualificatives agreeing to the noun are also shown due to their similar configuration. Exceptions, clarifications or outbreaks of the pattern will be demonstrated beneath the table.

Noun-classes
Class	Class Prefix sing. pl.	Example Kwara	English Translation	Concord Prefix sing. pl.	Example Kwara	English Translation
1."Person/ Living Things" 1.a (suffix)	gw- l- gwu- li- -ŋa	gwɛlɛ lɛlɛ gwutoɽo litoɽo baba babaŋa	Chief Chiefs Otoro Person Otoro Persons Father Fathers	gw- l-	gwiji gwiŋir baba gwi	A good person My father
2."Nature"	gw- j-	gwidi jidi	Arad tree Arad tree	gw- j-	gwaɽe gwɔl(a) elɔ	A tall tree
3."Unit-Collective"	l- ŋw- li- ŋwu-	lamɔn ŋwamɔn livuða ŋwuvuða	Finger Fingers Wild fig Wild figs	l- ŋw- li- ŋwu-	lɔiny lɛnɔ ŋwɔiny ŋwɛnɔ	That egg Those eggs
4."Thing"	g- j- k- c-	gödo jado kivið civið	Knife Knives Sword Swords	g- j- k- c-	gilöð gɔla jilöð jɔla	A long hoe Long hoes
5."Harmful Things"	ð- j- th- c-	ðimu jimu thar car	Scorpion Scorpions Rope Ropes	ð- j- th- c-	ðuŋo ðɔla juŋo jɔla	A long snake Long snakes
6."Long Things"	ð- d- th- d-	ðe de thole dole	Arm Arms Hyena Hyenas	ð- d- th- d-	ðe ði ðɔla de di dɔla	My arm is long My arms are long
7."Diminutives"	ŋ- ny-	ŋimiɽɔ nyimiɽɔ nirɛ nyirɛ ŋavirɛ yavirɛ	Cow Cows Spear Spears Cat Cats	ŋ- ny-	ŋaɽɛ ŋirithɔ nyaɽɛ nyirithɔ	The boy dances The boys dance
8."Hollow Deep Things"	g- n-	giði niði gömo nomo	Pot Pots Cave Caves	g- n-	giði gigirinu niði nigirinu	The pot is broken The pots are broken
9."Collective" A "Liquids" B "Abstract Nouns"	ŋi- (ŋw-) ŋ-	ŋan ŋila ŋəro ŋiɽainy	Milk (A) Oil (A) Work (B) Illness (B)	ŋ-	ŋan ŋadha	Where is the milk
10."Infinitive/Verbal Noun"	ði- ð-	ðiyo ðɛliŋa ðiritha	Drinking Singing Dancing	ði- ð-	ðiritha ðiŋir	Dancing is pleasant
11."initial Vowel" (miscellaneous group)	ji- j-	urið jurið indro jindro	Gazelle Gazelles Drum Drums	y- l-	indro yɛði gwɛlɛ	The chief's drum
12."One Form only"	- w- b- m- c- j- g- ð-	öɽu wuo bur marɔmɔthɔ cu jaba gɛrɛð ðirɔn	Hair Help Beam of light gunshot Bowels Chest Butter Wind	y- gw- gw- gw- j- j- g- ð-		

==== Exceptions, outbreaks or further explanation ====
Noun-class 1

This class encompasses human beings, tribal names and a few animals. The nouns ˈthingˈ, ˈhouse/homeˈ and ˈmoon/mothˈ also belong to this category. The prefixes that are mentioned in the chart are predominantly applied as illustrated, with a singular exception: when a noun initiates with ˈmˈ, ˈvˈ or ˈgwˈ only the plural prefixes are employed, omitting the singular prefixes.

Example: friend in Kwara mað(singular) limað(plural)

The subgroup ˈ1aˈ depicts a few personal names, kinship terms and loan-words for occupation or office.

Noun-class 2

This class pertains trees, plants and products of nature. The prefixes in this class do not consistently appear. Certain words allow for the omission of the singular prefix, while others omit the plural prefix, utilizing the singular form as collective.

Some nouns in class 2 use the singular prefix ˈg-ˈ or ˈk-ˈ alongside the plural prefix ˈj-ˈ, similar to class 4. Despite this resemblance, these nouns are categorised into this class due to the reliance on the concord prefixes ˈgw-ˈ and ˈj-ˈ.

For example, the doleib palm: gidɛ(Singular) jidɛ(plural)

concord prefix example: A tall doleib palm gidɛ gwɔl(a) elɔ

Noun-class 3

This class depicts things found in sets or large quantities, such as stars, salt, or fruit. Here, the singular form designates a single unit from the set, while the plural form signifies the set as a whole.

Noun-class 4

This class represents commonplace items, utensils, tools, weapons and a subset of "human defects". Notably, the pattern within this class exhibit inconsistency, with certain words lacking either the singular or plural form.

Example: hunter gina(singular) -

twins - jagul(plural)

Noun-class 5

This class predominantly consists of large or potentially harmful animals, reptiles etc. and it is comparatively smaller in size than other noun-classes. There has been an interchange of terms between Class 5 and Class 6, with words such as ˈroof poleˈ, ˈhairˈ, and ˈropeˈ moving from Class 6 to this classification. Additionally, ˈgiraffeˈ exhibits flexibility, allowing for the application of plural prefixes from both this class and Class 6.

Example: giraffe thul(singular) cul/dul(plural)

Noun-class 6

This class is characterised by items characterised by their great length, such as ˈarmˈ, ˈroadˈ or ˈstickˈ. Plural forms are predominantly formed as shown in the chart. There are only two exceptions within this classification. ˈWindˈ and ˈdry seasonˈ lack a plural form. Additionally, language names usually placed in this class, according to Stevenson, and commonly start with the prefix ˈð-ˈ.

Example: an Arab gwujulu

Arabic ðijulu

Noun-class 7

This class comprises terms denoting ˈmaleˈ and ˈfemaleˈ, along with domestic or small animals and a variety of miscellaneous nouns. Furthermore, there are no diminutives formed from nouns in other classes, instead Otoro utilizes the adjective for ˈsmallˈ which is '-iti/-ɔga', to convey such meanings.

Noun-class 8

This class represents entities linked by the concepts of hollowness and depth. Some words within this class are in a transitional state, potentially adopting the plural prefix ˈj-ˈ associated with Class 4.

Examples: spoon gaboɽɛ(singular) naboɽɛ/jaboɽɛ(plural)

wing gəbo(singular) jəbo(plural)

Noun-class 9

This class contains collectives of liquids or abstract nouns, often derived from nominal or adjectival roots. Additionally, there are nouns originating from verbal roots, which exhibit the class 10 prefix 'ð-'.

Noun-class 10

This class is made up of nouns in the infinitive as well as verbal nouns utilizing the prefix within this class for the creation of deverbative nouns. Infinitives, primarily ending in the back vowels 'a,' 'o,' or 'ɔ,' are put into this class due to their construction from nominal formations which necessitates concords with qualificatives akin to other nouns.

Example: looking ðimama(noun) manu(verb root)

Noun-class 11

This class comprises nouns with an initial vowel that exhibit a plural form. It is a miscellaneous group with no specific thematic connection like most of other classes. In addition to the discernible prefix pattern, another consistent feature is the transformation of an initial vowel into ˈiˈ after the ˈj-ˈ prefix.

Example: grindstone ɛlɛ(singular) jilɛ(plural)

day anyɛn(singular) jinyɛn(plural)

Noun-class 12

Class 12 encompasses nouns with singular forms, primarily representing collectives or abstract concepts. These nouns exhibit consonants such as 'b,' 'c,' or 'g,' or initiate with vowels, akin to class 11, but notably lack a plural form. Various patterns emerge within this diverse class. Nouns commencing with initial vowels necessitate the 'y-' prefix as a concord prefix, those starting in 'm,' 'b,' and 'w' demand 'gw-' as concord prefix, and those noun that take 'c' require 'j-' as their concord prefix. These distinct patterns are detailed in the chart above.

"Anomalous Forms"

Despite the presence of various patterns and exception within the noun-classes, certain nouns defy the categorization based on the grouping above. These outliers exhibit irregularities in their prefixes, exemplified by the presence of "mixed" prefixes.

Example: tooth liŋað Noun-class three, prefix 'l-'

Jiŋað Noun-class four, prefix 'j-'

she goat ŋuɽɔ Noun-class seven, prefix 'ŋ-'

juɽɔ Noun-class four, prefix ' j-'

==== General observations of the nouns in the Kwara variety ====
===== Differentiation in sex =====
While a few words inherently denote gender distinctions, such as 'ŋidhiri' (bull) and 'ŋimiɽɔ' (cow), the majority of terms, particularly kinship terms, are gender-neutral. For instance English distinctions between 'brother' and 'sister' are represented in a single term in Otoro, namely 'mɛgɛn'. In case where the gender is necessary, the word for female ('gwa') or male ('gwömio') is written after the noun. This addition is introduced by the relative pronoun '-ɛ' and the verb '-irɔ' (to be) with concord prefixes.

Example: male dog ŋin ŋɛ ŋirɔ gwömio (lit. Dog which is male)

===== Differentiation in size =====
To express variations in size, the Otoro language relies on adjectival stems. Notably, '-iboðɔ' signifies large size, while '-iti/-ɔga' conveys youth or small size. These adjectival stems are applied with the corresponding concord prefix associated with the noun.

Example: big lion lima loboðɔ

lion cub lima lɛ liti

===== Compound phrases =====
This language abstains from employing juxtaposition, yet one can identify a limited number of compound phases to "denote a single idea". To form the compound phrase the language utilizes the genitive particles '-a' and '-ɛði'.

Example: food ŋidi ŋɛði itha (lit. things of eating)

flame ðiŋila ðɛði igo (lit. tongue of fire)

===== Agent =====
In the absence of a dedicated term for a particular concept, expressing the agent of the action or occupation involves the use of a relative construction. For example, consider the word 'tree-cutter', which is expressed in Otoro through its literal meaning as 'person who fells trees'. In the Otoro language it will be pronounced as 'gwiji kwɛ gwathipi jaɽɛ'.

===== Nouns with multiple interpretations =====
There are instances where words encompass an additional meaning, such as 'göni', which may signify both 'ear' or 'leaf', or the term 'lalia', which holds meanings for 'bees' or 'honey'.

==== Accusative or object suffixes ====
The noun-suffix is used for constructing the object of a dative or transitive verb. However, the functionality of the accusative case or object suffix extends beyond this role. Furthermore, it can be employed to describe attributes, indicating adverbial manner, and forming nouns governed by postposition that specifically do not require a concord. Important to know is that the accusative is not utilized with prepositional phrases or the verb 'to be'. With the exception of these cases, no other case-endings are utilized.

In Otoro, the majority of nouns, excluding those in noun-class 1a and tribal names, language names and a few others, typically require a vowel suffix. In contrast, tribal names, etc., take consonant suffixes, while some nouns remain in their nominative form without any suffixes. To create the accusative or object form for nouns ending in vowels, which necessitate a suffix, either append them to the nominative form or alter the final vowel. In general, the suffix added to the noun remains mostly consistent between singular and plural forms.

Consonant suffixes	Vowel suffixes
-ŋ, -ŋɛ,- ŋu, -nya, -nyo; -ŋajiɛ (pl.)	-ɛ, -a, -ia, -o, -ɔ, -io

Examples
English	Nominative	Accusative
Otoro (pl.)	Litoɽo	litoɽa**ŋɛ**
Bull	ŋidiri	ŋidhiri**o**
Fathers	babaŋa	baba**ŋaijɛ**

Example of a word which does not take a suffix is 'gwuðɛ' meaning 'gazelle' or 'ŋaɽɛ' with the translation 'boy'.

Example of the different functions:

-Object of transitive or dative verbs

Call your father orniðɔ babaŋ gwua

-Describing an attribute

This man has a long beard gwiji kwɛnɔ guboðɔ lɔija (lit. large as to beard)

-Adverbial matter

He is telling a lie ŋumöðɔ nəviɽagala (lit. speaking by lying)

-Noun governed by postposition that do not require a concord

Come near the house ila duno githɔ

==== Noun-classes in the different varieties ====
The noun-class system remains consistent across all three major Otoro varieties. This includes the accusative endings and other features concerning nouns, despite minor distinctions in the Kwijur and Orombe variety. While the vowel suffixes exhibit nearly identical patterns in all three varieties, variations arise in the consonant suffixes. For instance, the vowel ending '-o' in the Kwara variety transforms to '-a' in the Kwijur variety, and the plural ending '-ŋaijɛ' in the Kwara variety appears as '-anji' in Kwijur and '-aijɛ' in Orombe. Moreover, certain nouns in the Kwara variety requiring the suffix '-ŋɛ' adopt different suffixes or none at all in the other two varieties. In a very few cases, the 'a' or 'o' in '-nya' and '-nyo' may be omitted. However a consistent feature across all three Otoro varieties involves nouns remaining in the nominative form, thereby do not require any suffix.

The prefixes utilized in the Kwara variety showcase a similar structure in the Kwijur and Orombe variety, therefore demonstrating a high degree of similarity. In Kwijur, a notable deviation in the first noun-class regarding to the singular prefix where the 'g' in 'gw-' often undergoes elision, resulting in many nouns initiating with the singular prefix 'w-'. Despite this alteration, the concord prefixes remain consistent and continues to be 'gw-'. This pattern is mirrored in the Orombe variety, albeit to a lesser extent. Additionally, in both varieties the plural prefix is noted to transition from 'l-/li-' to 'j-/c-' in certain cases.

Further changes emerge as some nouns classified in noun-class 4 for the Kwara and Orombe variety are assumed a place in class 8 in the Kwijur variety. Conversely, certain words designated as class 8 in Kwara and Orombe are reclassified in Kwijur as noun in class 4.

The general observation of the nouns regarding sex, size, compound phrases, agents etc. in Kwara have Identical patterns across all three varieties.

Examples
	English	Kwijur sing.	Kwijur pl.	Orombe sing.	Orombe pl.
Noun-class 1	chief person	gwelɛny wiji	lelɛny liji	wɛleny gwuji	lɛleny liji
Noun-class 2	ardeib tree	gwuɽa	juɽa	gwaɽɛ	jaɽɛ
Noun-class 3	finger	lamɔn	ŋwamɔn	lamon	ŋwamon
Noun-class 4	knife spoon	gönda gabiɽɛ	jönda jabiɽɛ	göda gabuɽɛ	jöda jabuɽɛ
Noun-class 5	scorpion	ðimu	jimu	ðimu	jimu
Noun-class 6	tongue	ðiŋila	diŋila	ðiŋila	diŋila
Noun-class 7	cow	ŋimiɽɔ	nyimiɽɔ	ŋimiɽɔ	nyimiɽɔ
Noun-class 8	pot	giði	niði	giði	niði
Noun-class 9	milk illness	ŋau (A) ŋiɽainy (B)	-	ŋau (A() ŋiɽainy (B)	-
Noun-class 10	to sing	ðɛliŋa	-	ðɛliŋa	-
Noun-class 11	drum	indrö	jinfdrö	indrö	jindrö
Noun-class 12	bamboo	amɛn	-	amɛn	-

=== Time and "tense" ===
Otoro does not distinguish in present, past or future when it comes to "tenses", instead the language differentiates widely spoken with "aspect". However, the 'three stems' that exist do not certainly assign to a particular aspect, such as definite, indefinite and dependent. The pattern of time in Otoro appears to be not thoroughly investigated. Consequently, the stems are identified by number rather than being associated with specific aspects.

The three stems are constructed by altering the final vowel of the verb, nevertheless there is no consistent pattern that applies identically to all the verbs. Some verbs may exhibit merely two different final vowels or even just one instead of three. The pattern of the third stem is relatively consistent with the vowel endings '-ɔ' or '-a'. Conversely, the other two stems lack continuity and do not demonstrate as clear a pattern. As a result, the vowel suffixes can be any vowel in the language. Despite the considerable variation in final vowels across all stems, there is a common pattern observed in the majority of verbs, as illustrated by the word 'beat' below.

Examples Verb stem
	'sleep'	'cook'	'beat'	'drink'	'bring'
1st stem	dhir**ɔ**	man**u**	pi**ði**	y**u**	ap**a**
2nd stem	dhir**ɛ**	man**i**	pi	y**u**	ap**a**
3rd stem	dhir**a**	man**a**	pi**ða**	y**o**	ap**a**

=== Pronouns ===
Otoros pronominal forms are categorised in four different groups, which are 'Personal Pronouns', 'Interrogative Pronouns', 'Indefinite Pronouns' and 'Demonstrative Pronouns'. Most pronouns do not require concord prefixes. Specifically, only the demonstrative pronouns need concord prefixes and the third person objects incorporated in the verb are concords themselves. Other than that the pronoun forms partake of the nature of nouns, such as the plural and accusative suffixes which are common to nouns designating kinship terms, persons, etc. and certain of pronouns.

==== Personal pronouns ====
The personal pronouns have a distinguished usage in three sub groups.

- The first group describes forms of personal reference used in isolation or accompanying, but not incorporated in, verbs.

Personal pronouns
English	Otoro Pronoun Subject
I	ŋi, ŋyi, i
You	ŋa, a
He/she/it	ŋu
We (all of us)	liŋo
We (not counting the person addressed)	anaŋa
You (pl.)	nyaŋa
They	ŋul (ŋa)

The three singular forms of the first person are used regularly, though the 'ŋyi' is rarely found in the Kwara variety and 'i' is used as a short version of the two others in all three Otoro varieties. In connected speech these pronouns are not mostly used in complete isolation. If they are emphatic the verb 'gwirɔ'(singular)/ 'lirɔ'(plural) meaning 'to be' must follow the pronoun. In addition, the third person pronouns may be omitted while a subject is expressed or the noun subject be missing especially if the subject understood is not a person. In Instance, the sentence 'ðiboðɔ' which means 'it (elephant) is big' or 'Litoɽo lirɔ' meaning 'they are Otoros' does not show the third person pronouns.

- The second subgroup contains personal pronouns as prefix, infix and suffix. Therefore, the pronouns are written as one word with the verbs. Here the distinction of subject and object is necessary.

===== Pronoun subject =====
Pronouns as affixes
Person	Prefix	Infix	Suffix
1 singular	i-	-i-	-I, -iŋi
2	ŋa-	-a-	-a, -o, -aŋa
3	ŋu-	-u-	-u, -o
1 plural	ana-	-ana-	-ana
2	nya-	-anya-	-anya
3	a-l	-al(i)	-(a)lɔ

The pronoun subject differs according to the form of the verb stems ("tenses"). In addition, the subject pronoun is split into three groups: forms of verbs preceded by concord prefix, verbs without concord prefix and forms with pronoun subject and object.

1. The verb forms which are preceded by a concord prefix use an identical pattern in every stem ("tense"). The first and second persons have the concords of the first noun-class, the "Person" class. Therefore, the singular concord prefix is 'gw-' and the plural concord prefix is 'l-'. The first person plural is an exception and uses the pronominal form 'n(i)- ' instead. The third person concord prefix is governed by the word it follows, so pronouns referring to nature will get the concord prefix 'gw-' and 'j-'. The concord prefix in the example is in bold print.

Examples
Stem	English	Otoro
1st stem	I sleep	ŋi **gw**udhirɔ
2nd stem	I shall sleep	ŋi **gw**adhirɛ
3rd stem	I am going to sleep	ŋi **gw**adhira

2. The verb forms without concord prefixes are built differently in the three stems. The first stem uses the suffixes mentioned above while the second and third stems use the prefixes. Although that pattern exists, the second and third persons in singular may add 'ŋ-' when prefixed, in instance 'ŋadhira' meaning 'you may sleep'. In addition, the third person plural loses the '-ɔ' it possesses when final. The suffix and prefix in the example are in bold print.

Examples
Stem	English	Otoro
1st stem	When I was sleeping	ŋənɔ dhir**i**
2nd stem/ 3rd stem	I may sleep	**i**dhirɛ

3. The verbs with pronoun subject and object has a quite clear pattern where both, the subject pronoun and object pronoun, are expressed with the verb and a certain order. In this case the object pronouns are in the third person as concords and the subject pronouns take the form of a suffix or infix. The order of the verb, subject pronoun and object pronoun differ in each stem. The order of the words in the first stem is object pronoun, verb and then the subject pronoun. The second and third stems share a pattern, with first the object pronoun, then the subject pronoun, and lastly the verb. Further explanation can be found in Stevenson's book Tira and Otoro on page 181, 182. The object pronoun in the example below is in bold print and the subject pronoun is in bold print and underlined.

Example
Stems	English	Otoro
1st stem	I hit him	ŋi **gwu**pið**i(ŋi)**
2nd stem/3rd stem	I shall hit him	ŋi **gwi**pi

===== Pronoun object =====
Pronoun objects
Person	Prefix	Infix	Suffix
1 singular	-	-ŋi-	-iŋi
2	-	-ŋa-	-aŋa
3	(gw-)	-	-
1 plural	-	-iji-	-ijɛ
2	-	-aji-	-ajɛ
3	(l-)	-l-	-lɔ

The third person prefix in the chart are the ones of the "Person" class. If a noun object of another noun-class is used the concords change accordingly.

"These form an integral part of the verb complex". The order of the object pronoun, subject pronoun and verb takes a complex pattern which changes according to the person, number of object pronouns and the verb stems. A common pattern is found within the first and second person objects, however the third person objects take many modifications. Further explanation by Stevenson are depicted in the book Tira and Otoro on page 183–188.

- The third subgroup of personal pronouns describes other object pronouns, and other forms used with prepositions.

The pronoun subject, mentioned in the first subgroup, can have accusative suffixes like personal nouns. These make one form of the pronoun objects.

First Form (1)
Person	Pronoun subject	Accusative	English
1 singular	ŋi	ŋiŋu	me
2	ŋa	ŋaŋu	you
3	ŋu	ŋuŋu	him, her
1 plural	liŋo	liŋaijɛ	us (all of us)
1	anaŋa	anaŋaijɛ	us (not counting the person addressed)
2	nyaŋa	nyaŋaijɛ	you (pl.)
3	ŋul	ŋulŋaijɛ	them

Those accusatives are used with postposition with the other forms, used after preposition 'li (l-)' meaning 'to', 'from' and 'than', as alternatives. Usually they are used with other prepositions, but are always compounded with 'l-', which is in bold print below.

Second Form (2)
Person	English	Otoro
1 singular	to me, etc.	**l**ugwi or **l**ugwunyi
2	to you	**l**ugwa or **l**ugwuŋa
3	to him, her	**l**uguŋ
1 plural	to us (all of us)	**l**agɛ
1	us (not counting the person addressed)	**l**agöri
2	you (pl.)	**l**agalɔ
3	them	**l**agɛn

The same words may be used preceding the second form as prepositions or following the first form.

Example: near me 1) ŋiŋu githɔ,or 2) githɔ lugwi

behinde you(pl.) 1) nyaŋaijɛ gidɔ,or 2) gidɔ lagalɔ

== Bibliography ==
- Kodi, Musa, et al. 2002. Otoro Alphabet Story Book. Sudan: Sudan Workshop Programme.
- Stevenson, Roland C. (2009). Tira and Otoro. Cologne: Köppe. ISBN 9783896451736.
