= Nuba peoples =

Ethnic group in Sudan

Nuba
Total population
- 3.7 million

Regions with significant populations
- Sudan (Nuba Mountains) and South Sudan
- Sudan: 3.7 million
- South Sudan: 70,000

Languages
- See languages of the Nuba Mountains

Religion
- Islam, Traditional African religions, Christianity

The Nuba people are indigenous inhabitants of southern Sudan. The Nuba are made up of 50 various indigenous ethnic groups who inhabit the Nuba Mountains of South Kordofan state in Sudan, encompassing multiple distinct people that speak different languages which belong to at least two unrelated language families. Estimates of the Nuba population vary widely; the Sudanese government estimated that they numbered 2.07 million in 2003.

The term Nuba should not be confused with the Nubians, an unrelated ethnic group speaking the Nubian languages living in northern Sudan and southern Egypt, although the Hill Nubians, who live in the Nuba Mountains, are also considered part of the Nubian people.

== Overview ==
=== Dwellings ===
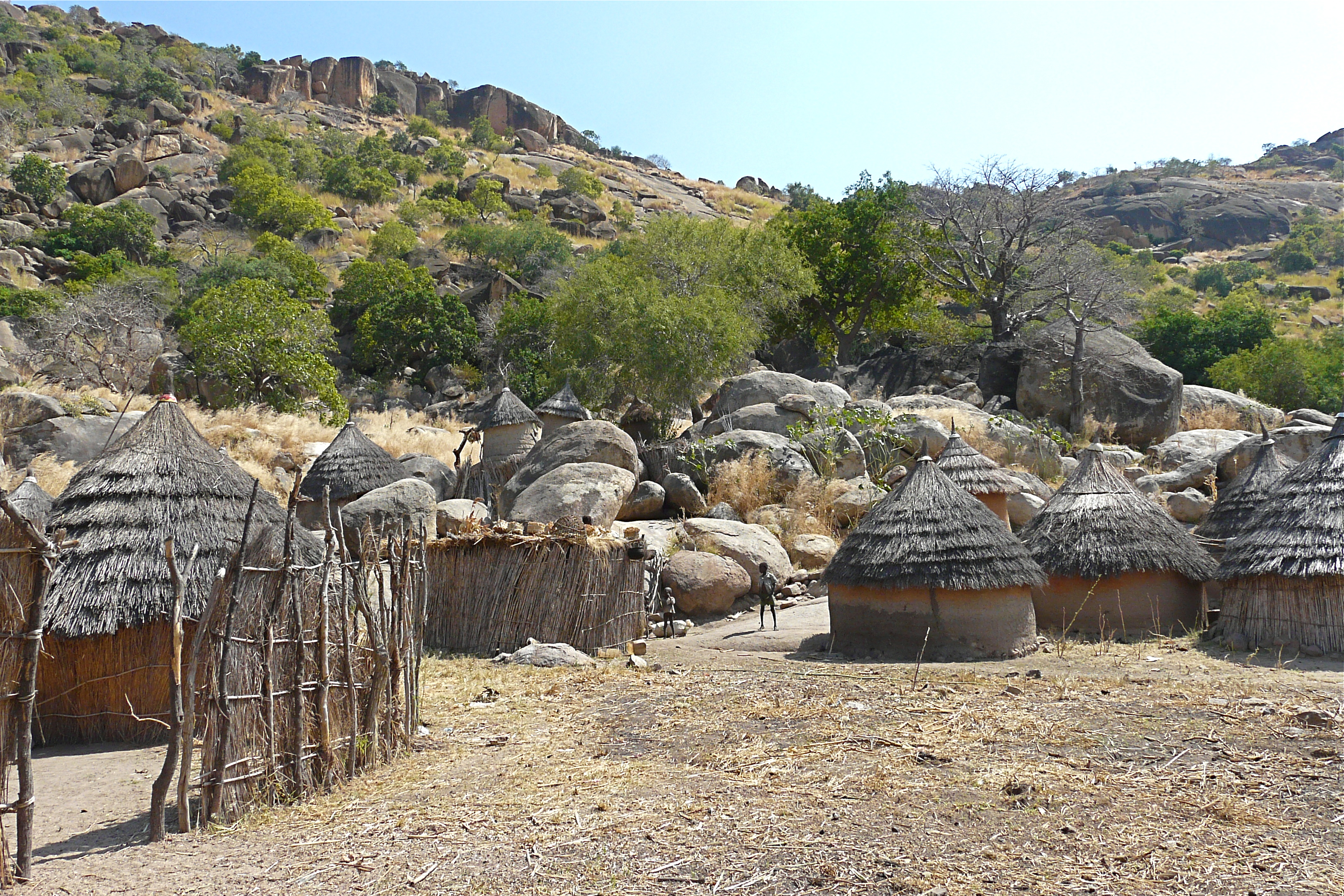
A Nuba village in the Nuba Mountains

The Nuba people reside in the foothills of the Nuba Mountains. Villages consist of family compounds. A family compound consists of a rectangular compound enclosing two round mud huts thatched with sorghum stalks facing each other called a shal. The shal is fenced with wooden posts interwoven with straw. Two benches run down each side of the shal with a fire in the middle where families will tell stories and oral traditions. Around the shal is the much larger yard, the tog placed in front. The fence of the tog is made of strong tree branches as high as the roof of the huts. Small livestock like goats and chickens and donkeys are kept in the tog. Each compound has tall conical granaries called durs which stand on one side of the tog. At the back of the compound is a small yard where maize and vegetables like pumpkin, beans and peanuts are grown.

=== Languages ===
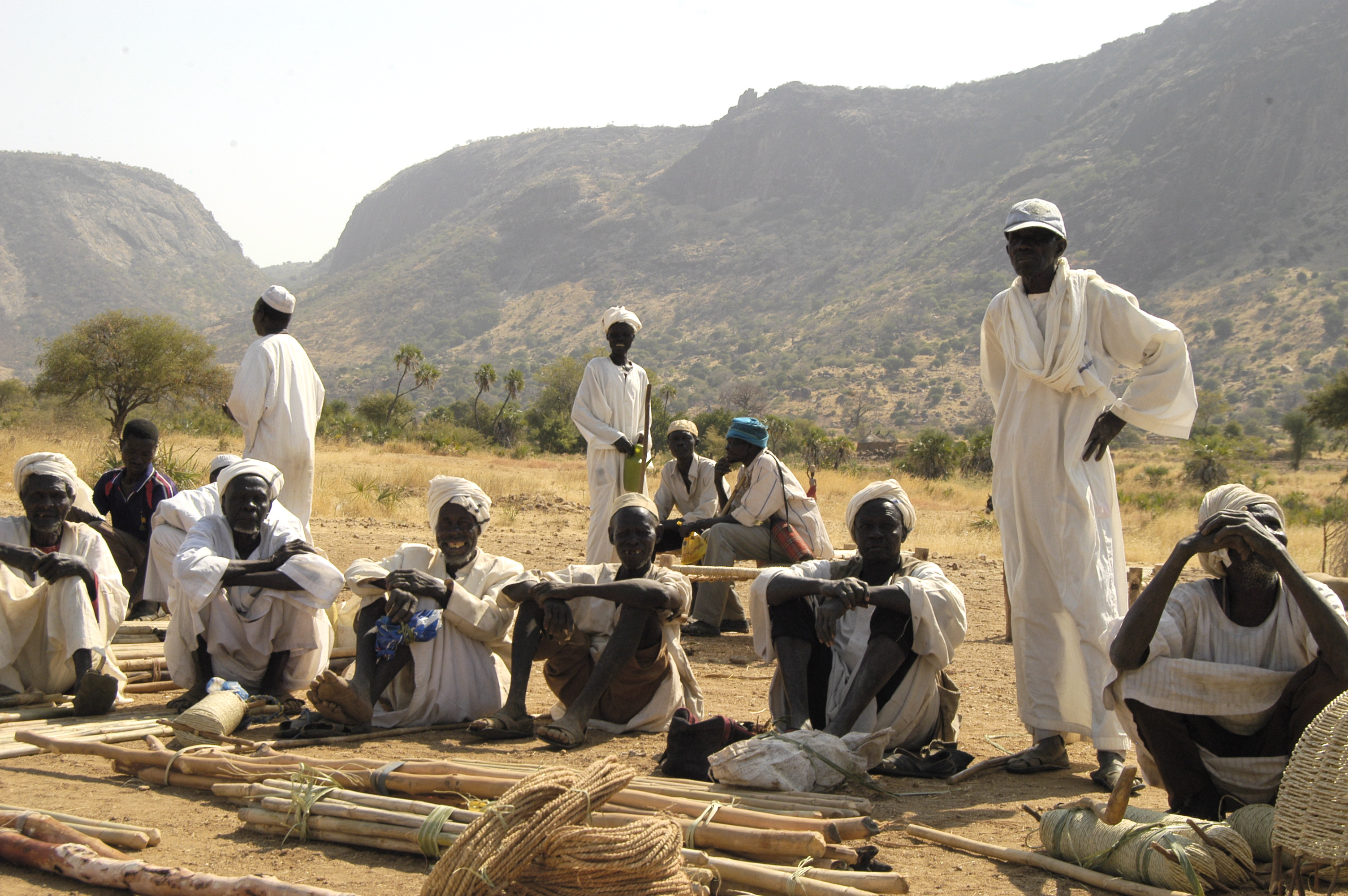
Nuba people in the Nuba Mountains

The Nuba people speak various languages not closely related to each other. Most of the Nuba people speak one of the many languages in the geographic Kordofanian language group of the Nuba Mountains. This language group is primarily in the major Niger–Congo language family and may be the oldest group of languages in the region. Several Nuba languages are in the Nilo-Saharan language family.

Over one hundred languages are spoken in the area and are considered Nuba languages, although many of the Nuba also speak Sudanese Arabic, the common language of Sudan.

=== Culture ===
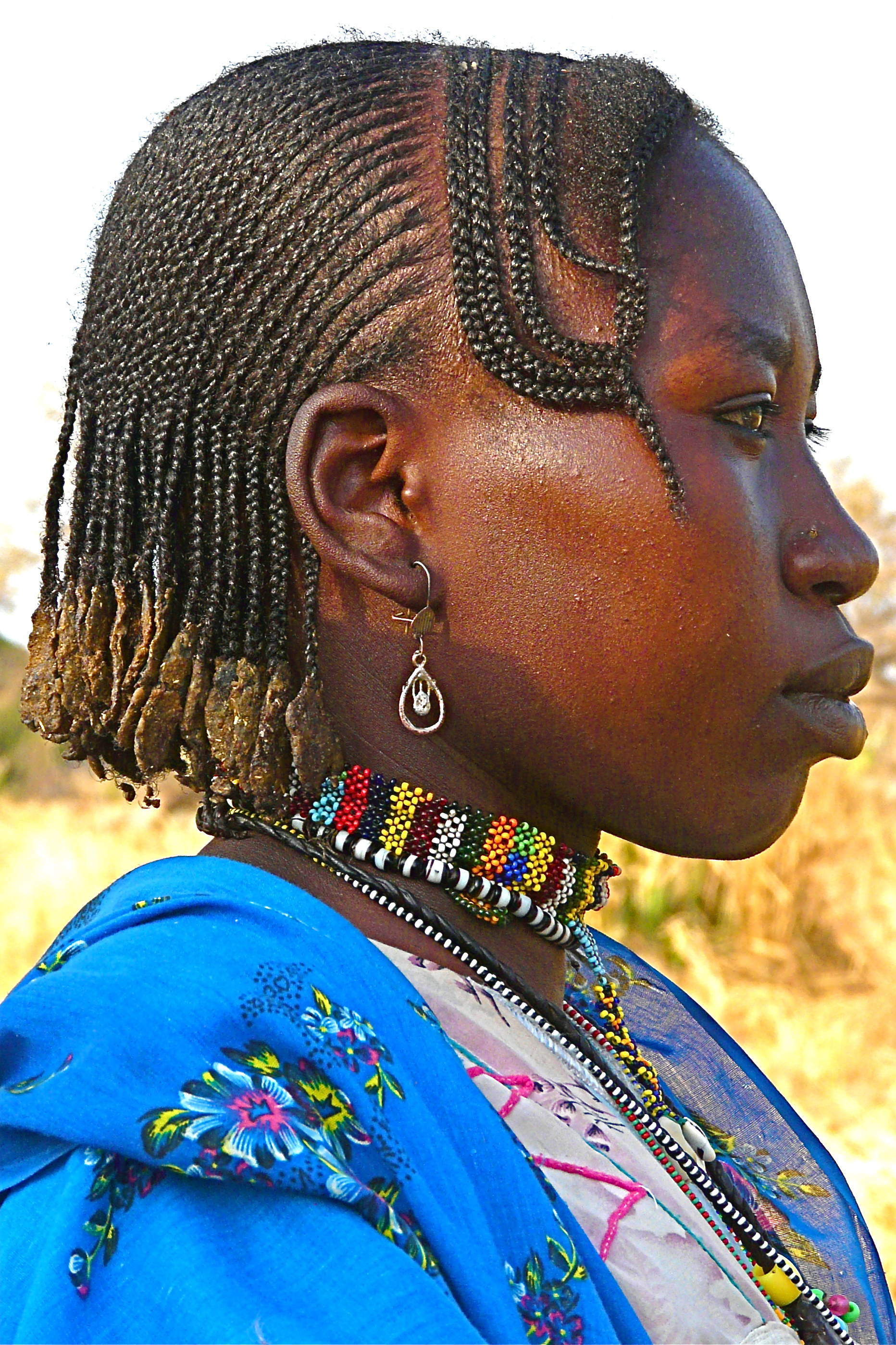
Nuba woman near Kau

The Nuba people are primarily farmers, as well as herders who keep cattle, chickens, and other domestic animals. They often maintain three different farms: a garden near their homes where vegetables needing constant attention, such as onions, peppers and beans, are grown; fields further up the hills where quick growing crops such as red millet can be cultivated without irrigation; and farms farther away, where white millet and other crops are planted.

A distinctive characteristic of the Nuba people is their passion for athletic competition, particularly traditional wrestling. The strongest young men of a community compete with athletes from other villages for the chance to promote their personal and their village's pride and strength. In some villages, older men participate in club- or spear-fighting contests. The Nubas’ passion for physical excellence is also displayed through the young men's vanity—they often spend hours painting their bodies with complex patterns and decorations. This vanity reflects the basic Nuba belief in the power and importance of strength and beauty.

==== Religions ====
The primary religion of many Nuba people is Islam, with some Christians, and traditional shamanistic beliefs also prevailing. Muslim Men wear a sarong and occasionally a skull cap. Older women and young women wear beads and wrap a sarong over their legs and sometimes a cloak tie on the shoulder. Both sexes practice scarification and circumcision for boys and female genital mutilation for girls. Some men shave their heads, older Muslim men wear skull caps and grow beards, women and girls braid their hair in strands and string it with beads.

The majority of the Nuba living in the east, west and northern parts of the mountains are Muslims, while those living to the south are either Christians or practice traditional animistic religions. In those areas of the Nuba mountains where Islam has not deeply penetrated, ritual specialists and priests hold as much control as the clan elders, for it is they who are responsible for rain control, keeping the peace, and rituals to ensure successful crops. Many are guardians of the shrines where items are kept to insure positive outcomes of the rituals (such as rain stones for the rain magic), and some also undergo what they recognize as spiritual possession.

==== Politics ====
In the 1986 elections, the National Umma Party lost several seats to the Nuba Mountains General Union and to the Sudan National Party, due to the reduced level of support from the Nuba Mountains region. There is reason to believe that attacks by the government-supported militia, the Popular Defense Force (PDF), on several Nuba villages were meant to be in retaliation for this drop in support, which was seen as signaling increased support of the SPLA. The PDF attacks were particularly violent, and have been cited as examples of crimes against humanity that took place during the Second Sudanese Civil War.

During the military dictatorship of Omar al-Bashir, Nuba people in the capital Khartoum were repeatedly attacked and some even killed by pro-government students and agents of the National Intelligence and Security Service. As a result of discrimination by governments and parts of the Sudanese society, Nuba people have been largely excluded from the official national Sudanese identity, and hardly ever been represented in the government.

=== Nuba people in Khartoum ===
Following the Nuba Cultural Heritage Festival in 2011 in Omdurman, Nuba residents of Greater Khartoum have been celebrating Nuba culture in the capital. Part of these celebrations has been the selection of educated, young Nuba women as Beauty Queens of the Nuba Mountains. In 2014, Natalina Yacoub, at the time a student at Ahfad University for Women, was chosen as Nuba Beauty Queen and subsequently gave the first TEDx talk of a Nuba person. Being a member of the Christian minority in Sudan, she presented a Christmas gift on 24 December 2019 to then-Prime Minister Abdalla Hamdok, who subsequently tweeted: "This is the Sudan we dream of. One that respects diversity and enables all Sudanese citizens to practice their faith in a safe and dignified environment."

== Nuba Mountains ==
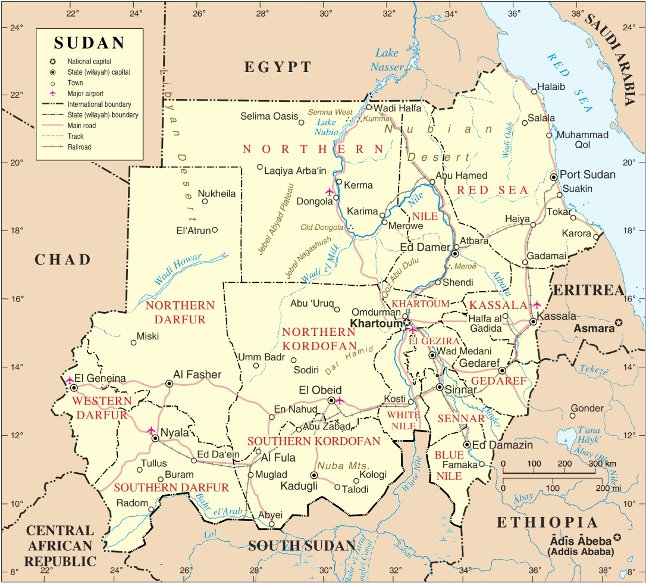
Nuba Mountains in Southern Kordofan, Sudan

In Antiquity, the Nuba Mountains were a part of the Kingdom of Kush. In the Middle Ages, the area was a part of the kingdom of Alodia. The Nuba people reside in one of the most remote and inaccessible places in all of Sudan, the foothills of the Nuba Mountains in central Sudan. At one time the area was considered a place of refuge, bringing together people of many different tongues and backgrounds who were fleeing oppressive governments and slave traders.

The Nuba Mountains mark the southern border of the sands of the desert and the northern limit of good soils washed down by the Nile River. Many Nuba, however, have migrated to the Sudanese capital of Khartoum to escape persecution and the effects of Sudan's civil war. Most of the rest of the 1,000,000 Nuba people live in villages and towns of between 1,000 and 50,000 inhabitants in areas in and surrounding the Nuba mountains. Nuba villages are often built where valleys run from the hills out on to the surrounding plains, because water is easier to find at such points and wells can be used all year long. There is no political unity among the various Nuba groups who live on the hills. Often the villages do not have chiefs, but are instead organized into clans or extended family groups with village authority left in the hands of clan elders.

== War in the Nuba Mountains ==
=== Second Sudanese Civil War (1983–2005) ===
After some earlier incursions by the SPLA, the Second Sudanese Civil War started full scale in the Nuba Mountains when the Volcano Battalion of the SPLA under the command of the Nuba Yousif Kuwa Mekki and Abdel Aziz Adam al-Hillu entered the mountains and began to recruit Nuba volunteers and send them to SPLA training facilities in Ethiopia. The volunteers walked to Ethiopia and back and many of them perished on the way.

During the war, the SPLA generally held the mountains, while the Sudanese Army held the towns and fertile lands at the feet of the mountains, but was generally unable to dislodge the SPLA, even though the latter was usually undersupplied. The Governments of Sudan under Sadiq al-Mahdi and Omar al-Bashir also armed militias of Baggara Arabs to fight the Nuba and transferred many Nuba forcibly to camps.

In early 2002, the Government and the SPLA agreed on an internationally supervised ceasefire. International observers and advisors were quickly dispatched to Kadugli and several deployed into the mountains to co-located with SPLA command elements, with the base camp located in Kauda.

At that time, al-Hillu was the governor of the Nuba Mountains. During the course of the following months, relief supplies from the UN were airdropped to stem the starvation of many in the mountains.

The ceasefire in Nuba Mountains was the foundation for the Comprehensive Peace Agreement (CPA) signed in January 2005. This fragile peace remains in force, but infighting in the south, plus the Government of Sudan involvement in Darfur have resulted in issues which may break the peace agreement.

=== Secession of South Sudan (2011) ===
Southern Sudan voted to secede from Sudan in the 2011 South Sudanese independence referendum. This provision was agreed to in the CPA. This resulted in the formation of a new country, South Sudan, from the southern portion of Sudan. However, conflict between northern and southern forces, and against the Nuba peoples was renewed again in the region in 2011 in South Kordofan and Blue Nile.

== Media ==
- Local filmmaker Roopa Gogineni documented Bisha TV, a satirical muppet show popular throughout the Nuba lands, which serves as an "example of how people use comedy to deal with authoritarian rule." The show mocks Sudan's President Omar al-Bashir, depicting him as the killer of children and bomber of hospitals. A short documentary by Gogineni includes an apparent bombing of Kauda by an Antonov An-12 aircraft, as well as a public screening of Bisha TV in front of dozens of local residents.
- Eyes and Ears of God: Video Surveillance of Sudan (2012) film by peace activist Tomo Križnar on YouTube. The documentary film shows ethnic Nuba civilians defending themselves with the help of over 400 cameras distributed by Križnar and Klemen Mihelič, the founder of humanitarian organisation H.O.P.E., to volunteers across the war zones in the Nuba Mountains, the Blue Nile, and Darfur, documenting the (North) Sudanese military's war crimes against local populations.
- Leni Riefenstahl, known for her 1930s Nazi propaganda films Triumph of the Will and Olympia, published two collections of her photographs of Nuba peoples, entitled The Last of the Nuba (1973) and The People of Kau (1976).
- Nuba Conversations (2000), a documentary and ethnographic film directed by Arthur Howes.

== See also ==
- Dilling people
- Heiban Nuba
- Ghulfan people
- Kadaru people
- Katla people
- Kanga people
- Karko people
- Keiga people
- Keiga Jirru
- Koalib Nuba
- Krongo Nuba
- Logol people
- Moro Nuba
- Nuba fighting
- Nyimang
- Otoro Nuba
- Tagale people
- Talodi people
- Tira people

- Index: Nuba peoples

- Languages of the Nuba Mountains
