= Moro Nuba people =

Moro
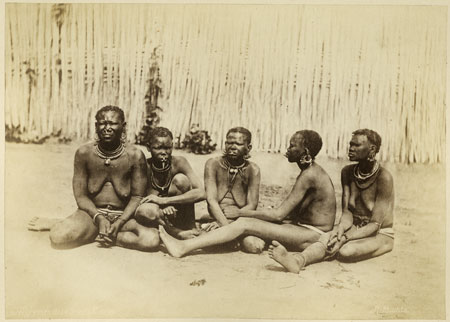

Total population
- 93,000

Languages
- Moro

Religion
- Catholicism, minority Sunni Islam

Related ethnic groups
- Other Nuba people

The Moro Nuba are a sub-ethnic group of the Nuba peoples in the Nuba Mountains of South Kordofan state, in southern Sudan. Many members of this ethnicity are Christians. The population of this ethnic group possibly exceeds 80,000 people.

== Land ==
=== Down-migration ===
Until the early 1940s, all of the Moro Nuba resided on the tops of mountains in the Nuba Mountains, similar to many other Nuba peoples. Various Nuba ethnic groups, including the Moro, were driven up to higher elevations because of tribal wars, wandering nomads, government slave raids, and attacks from Sudanese forces during the Mahdist War. Specifically, the Moro sought protection in the hills from slave traders.

After Sudan came under Anglo-Egyptian rule, the Moro began to migrate downwards into the surrounding plains of the Nuba Hills. A strong government under Condominium rule meant that intertribal wars were much more infrequent, and also ceasing previous government attacks on Nuba peoples. The Moro also migrated downwards because of population growth and a lack of farmable land. Additionally, a yellow fever epidemic in 1940 caused the Moro to burn their farms in attempts to rid their villages of the disease, which in turn destroyed their farmland and forced them to migrate downward. Down-migration of the Moro into surrounding plains allowed for them to engage in agriculture, especially cotton which had developed into a cash crop of Sudan. They also grow maize, sorghum, groundnuts, gourds, okra, horse beans, and sesame, all of which are indigenous to them. Additionally, down-migration resulted in increased interaction between various clans of the Moro, and began attracting working-age males into mechanized agriculture from outside the hills.

=== Land ownership ===
The Moro do not have ownership over their land, despite being indigenous to it. A series of land registration acts starting in 1905 and culminating with the 1970 Unregistered Land Act, decreed that any land not registered to private owners was government property, including land in the Nuba Mountains and other previously excluded indigenous lands. As a result, the Moro are often forced to move away from their land to work in mechanized agriculture for other parties, in order to generate income.

In addition, the Sudanese government has sponsored the immigration of Baggara and Jellaba ethnic groups into indigenous Moro lands, effectively pushing out the Moro from their farming lands. As a response, the Moro organized the Nuba Mountain Political Union, though success has been limited.

== Culture ==
Modern Moro culture, including religion, has been described as an "accretion" of outside influences, as the Moro adjust to the modern world while embracing traditional practices. Additionally, the Moro do not refer to themselves as the Moro, as they have no common tribal name, only being referred to as the Moro by neighboring ethnic groups.

=== Ethnic identity ===
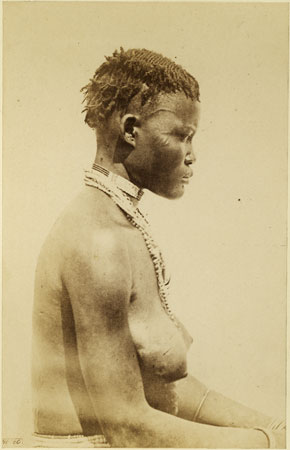

In between 1929-1940, colonial administration enforced a policy dubbed the Nuba Policy, which attempted to preserve the indigenous cultures of the Nuba peoples and additionally prevent their Arabization. To do so, they grouped various Nuba peoples, including the Moro, into provinces governed by singular meks, or governing chiefs. Because of their close proximity, it was necessary for ethnic groups to differentiate from one another to preserve their cultures, which strengthened their ethnic identity salience and widened divisions between neighboring ethnic groups.

For example, despite Sudan being a majority Muslim country, most Moro people practice a syncretic form of Christianity, introduced by British-sponsored missionaries, combining the Christian faith with traditional ritual practices. The Moro are neighbored by various Baggara tribes who also live in the Nuba Mountains, who dominate local trade. As a result, the Moro also identify with Christianity as an ethnic faith to differentiate themselves from their Baggara competitors, who are Muslim.

Additionally, the Moro maintain this strong sense of ethnic identity by disallowing intermarriage between other ethnic groups, and the integration of non-Moro into their society. Some scholars suggest this is how the Moro have resisted Islamization in the Nuba mountains, which has affected other neighboring ethnic groups.

=== Social structures ===
Society is organized into patrilineal clans, with several clans occupying each hill. Individual clans also have specialized roles, including performing religious ceremonies and leading raiding parties. Before Condominium rule, the Moro had no system of tribal leadership. However, colonial powers implemented a system of elected meks, who had assistance from junior chiefs from surrounding hills.

The Moro are split into five specific age groups, which are ngere (ages 1–15), epidi (ages 15–22), udoming (ages 23–30), maji (old adults, and utari (elders). Epidi commonly engage in stickfighting as a form of entertainment and friendly competition, and they are encouraged to do so. Each age group also has specialized responsibilities, such as ngere helping with household tasks and udoming leaving the plains to work in mechanized agriculture. The transition of age groups is often accompanied by ceremony closely related to agriculture.

== Language ==
The Moro Nuba speak the Moro language of the Kordofanian languages group, in the major Niger–Congo language family. Additionally, Moro is structurally similar to Bantu languages, despite not sharing any cognates. It follows a subject-verb-object word order. The Moro people do not have a written language, meaning that much of their history, especially migration and movement, has been forgotten.

== Human rights abuses ==
Because of its close proximity to the Sudan-South Sudan border, violence between both states in various conflicts, notably the Second Sudanese Civil War, has taken place in the Nuba Mountains, including the hills where the Moro live. The Moro, among other Nuba peoples, have been subject to the crossfire of intense violence between both forces, and have been targeted by Sudanese militias for their support or association with the Sudan People's Liberation Movement and Army (SPLM/A). The 1989 Popular Defense Forces Act, which allowed militias to act as paramilitary forces on behalf of the Sudanese government, was particularly devastating for Moro people as ethnic militias like the Baggara were more inclined to violence against differing ethnic groups. In addition, displaced Nuba peoples have been relocated into "peace camps", where they are used as cheap labor for mechanized agriculture. Large populations of displaced Moro have also fled to Omdurman, South Sudan, and Egypt.

Various human rights concerns have been raised over the unprovoked attacks on Nuba peoples, including the Moro. Attacks on the Nuba sponsored by the Sudanese government have been touted as genocide-by-attrition, as an intentional erasure of these peoples. The Sudanese government has also been accused of the ethnocide of the Moro, who claim indigeneity to the Nuba Mountains. Such targeted violence continues to happen today, perpetrated by Sudan's Rapid Support Forces (RSF) who operate under General Abdel Fatteh al-Burhan, who took power through a military coup in October 2021.

== See also ==
- Index: Nuba peoples
