= Heiban people =

Languages
- Heiban

Religion
- Christianity, Islam

Related ethnic groups
- Talodi, Otoro

The Heiban Nuba are an ethnic group Indigenous to the Nuba Mountains in Sudan.

Heiban are very close to the Otoro tribe and they both live in the South of Nuba mountains between Delami and Talodi and can understand the language of one another.

The Heiban people are predominantly Christian, with a Muslim minority, and live in the Heiban county located in the Heiban mountains.

== Language ==
The Heiban languages belong to Kordofanian languages group, of the Nuba Mountains, which is in the major family of Niger–Congo languages.

== See also ==
- Nuba peoples
- Index: Nuba peoples
