= Talodi people =

Nuba Tribe

Total population
- 1,500 In 1989

Languages
- Sudanese Arabic, Talodi

Religion
- Sunni Islam

Related ethnic groups
- Heiban

The Talodi are a sub-ethnic group of the Nuba peoples in the Nuba Mountains of South Kordofan state, in Sudan.

== Language ==
The Talodi people speak Talodi in the Talodi–Heiban languages group. They are in the Kordofanian languages grouping of the Nuba Mountains, which is a branch of the major Niger–Congo language family.

== See also ==
- Demography of Sudan
