= Languages of Gabon =

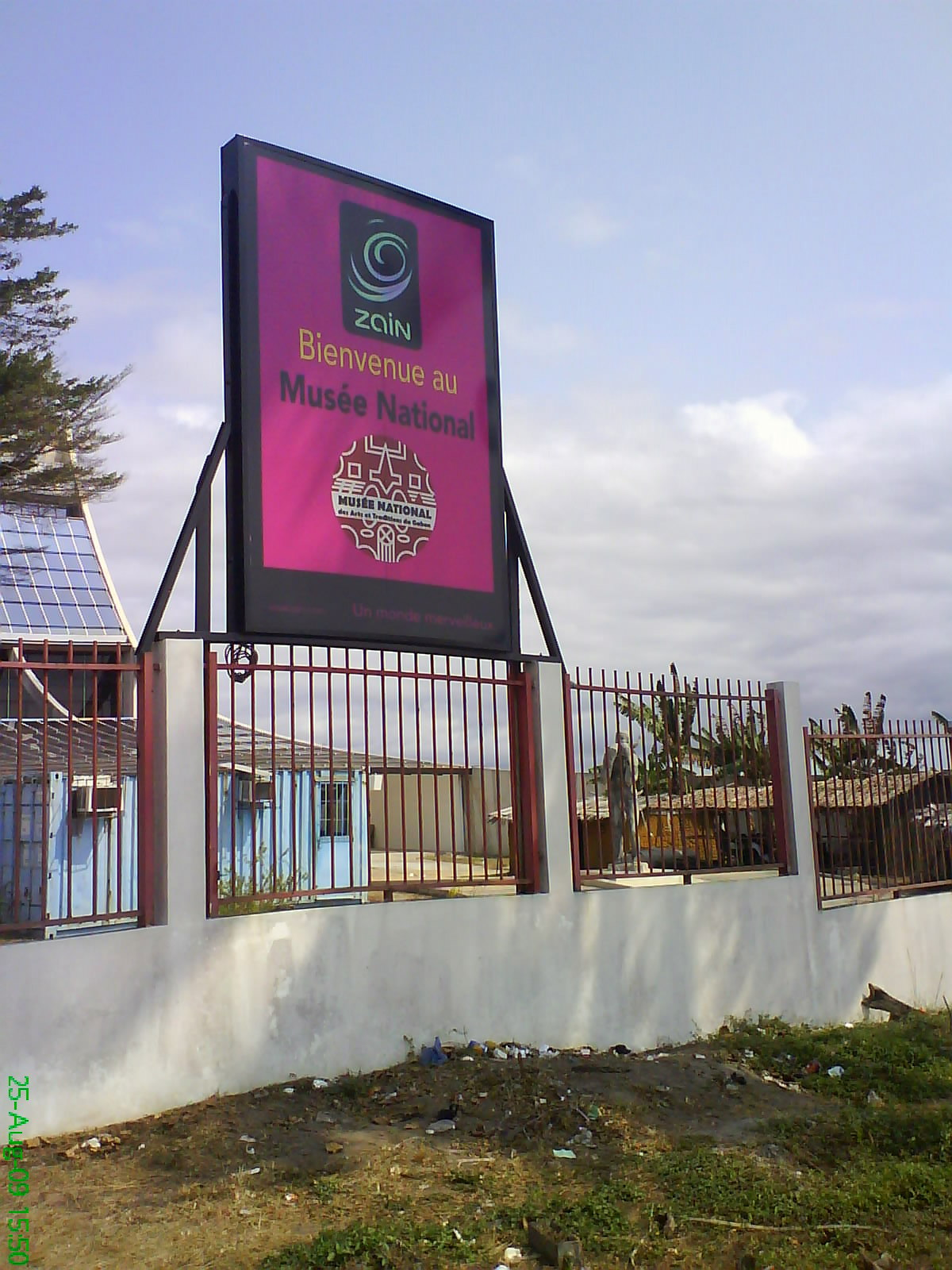
- Sign in French at the Musée National in Libreville
- Official: French
- Indigenous: Fang and other Bantu languages; Baka
- Foreign: Hausa, Levantine Arabic, Kabuverdianu
- Signed: Francophone African Sign Language
- Keyboard layout: French AZERTY

French is the official language in Gabon, spoken natively in large metropolitan areas and in total by 320,000 people or 14% of the country. 32% of the people speak Fang as a mother tongue. French is the medium of instruction. Before World War II very few Gabonese learned French, nearly all of them working in either business or government administration. After the war, France worked for universal primary education in Gabon, and by the 1960-61 census, 47% of the Gabonese over the age of 14 spoke some French, while 13% were literate in the language. By the 1990s, the literacy rate had risen to about 60%.

Gabon is a Francophone country, where, as of 2024, 1.683 million (66.3%) out of 2.539 million people speak French.

It is estimated that 80% of the country's population can speak the language competently and one-third of residents of Libreville, the capital city, had become native French speakers.

Across major metropolitan areas, French is increasingly being spoken as a native language as well.

More than 10,000 French people live in Gabon, and France predominates the country's foreign cultural and commercial influences. Outside the capital, French is less commonly spoken, though it is used by those who have completed a secondary or university education.

The 40 extant indigenous languages are all members of the Bantu branch of the Niger-Congo phylum except for Baka, which is an Ubangian language spoken by an estimated 3,000 Baka people in the north of Gabon. Bantu languages are estimated to have come to Gabon about 2,000 years ago and differentiated into about 40 languages. They are generally spoken but not written; while missionaries from the United States and France developed transcriptions for a number of languages based on the Latin alphabet starting in the 1840s and translated the Bible into several of them, French colonial policy officially promoted the study of French and discouraged African languages. The languages continue to be transmitted through family and clan, and individuals in cities and other areas where different people may learn several Bantu languages.

The Gabonese government sponsored research on the Bantu languages starting in the 1970s.

The largest languages are Fang, French, Punu, the Mbere dialect cluster, Njebi and the Teke languages.

Education for the deaf in Gabon uses American Sign Language, introduced by the deaf American missionary Andrew Foster. (See Francophone African Sign Language.)

== List of languages ==
- Indo-European languages
  - Romance languages
    - French (ISO code fra)
- Niger–Congo languages
  - Beti languages
    - Fang (fan)
  - Kele–Tsogo languages
    - Kendell (kbs)
    - Sake (sag)
    - Seki (syi)
    - Sighu (sxe)
    - Simba (sbw)
    - Tsogo (tsv)
    - Viya (gev)
    - Wumbvu (wum)
  - Makaa–Njem languages
    - Bekwel (bkw)
  - Mbam languages
    - Bubi (buw)
  - Mbete languages
    - Kanin (kzo)
  - Nzebi languages
    - Duma (dma)
    - Tsaangi (tsa)
    - Wandji (wdd)
  - Sawabantu languages
    - Benga (ben)
    - Yasa (yko)
  - Sira languages
    - Barama (bbg)
    - Bwisi (bwz)
    - Lumbu (lup)
    - Sangu (snq)
    - Sira (swj), aka Eshira, Shira
    - Vili (vif)
  - Teke languages
    - Northern Teke (teg)
    - Western Teke (tez)
    - Vumbu (vum)
- Ubangian languages
  - Ngbaka languages
    - Baka
