= Latin beta =

Additional letter of the Latin alphabet

- Ꞵ ꞵ

Usage
- Writing system: Latin script
- Type: alphabetic
- Language of origin: Pinji, Benga, Barama, Galwa, Viya, Kande, Kaning'i, Lumbu, Myene, Ndumu, Ngom, Njebi, Vove, Punu, Sangu, Shira, Vumbu, Ndaʼndaʼ language (formerly)
- Sound values: [β]
- In Unicode: U+A7B4, U+A7B5

History
- Development: Β β: Ꞵ ꞵ
- Sisters: B, Β

Other
- Writing direction: Left-to-Right

Latin beta (uppercase: Ꞵ, lowercase: ꞵ), is an additional letter of the Latin script. Its shape is based on the lowercase shape of the Greek letter beta ⟨β⟩. The letter is used in the various languages of Gabon and has been used in Ndaʼndaʼ language in Cameroon to represent the voiced bilabial fricative, a sound similar to ⟨v⟩ articulated with both lips. It is neither typographically nor linguistically related to the similar looking letter eszett ⟨ẞ, ß⟩ used in German orthography, which represents an /s/ sound when following long vowels or diphthongs.

In the IPA, it represents a voiced bilabial fricative, but the Greek beta can also be used.

== Usage ==
The letter is used in the scientific alphabet of the languages of Gabon used for Pinji, Benga, Barama, Galwa, Viya, Kande, Kaning'i, Lumbu, Myene, Ndumu, Ngom, Njebi, Vove, Punu, Sangu, Shira and Vumbu languages.

Additionally, it has been used in 2013 in the alphabet made by Émile Gille Nguendjio for the Ndaʼndaʼ language, for example in the word káꞵé ([ka˥βe˥]), which means "cover". Nguendjio replaced it with the letter P in 2014.

== Encodings ==
Character information
Preview	Ꞵ		ꞵ	
Unicode name	LATIN CAPITAL LETTER BETA		LATIN SMALL LETTER BETA	
Encodings	decimal	hex	dec	hex
Unicode	42932	U+A7B4	42933	U+A7B5
UTF-8	234 158 180	EA 9E B4	234 158 181	EA 9E B5
Numeric character reference	&#42932;	&#xA7B4;	&#42933;	&#xA7B5;

== Bibliography ==
- David Abercrombie, Elements of general phonetics, Edimborgh, Edinburgh University Press, 1967.
- Émile-Gille Nguendjio, Grammaire pratique du báŋgwà, Éditions Ifrikiya. Interlignes, 2013. OCLC 902724090.
- Actes du séminaire des experts, Alphabet scientifique des langues du Gabon (20/24 février 1989), Revue Gabonaise des Sciences de l’Homme, Libreville, Université Omar Bongo, vol. 2, 1990.
- Blanchon, Jean Alain (1999). Douze études sur les langues du Gabon et du Congo-Brazzaville. LINCOM studies in African linguistics. München: LINCOM Europa. p. 228. ISBN 978-3-89586-605-0.
- Michael Everson, Denis Jacquerye et Chris Lilley, Proposal for the addition of ten Latin characters to the UCS. ISO/IEC JTC1/SC2/WG2, Document N4297., 26 July 2012
