= Kingdom of Orungu =

Pre-colonial state in Gabon

Kingdom of Orungu Royaume d'Orungu
- c. 1700–1927
- Status: Coastal kingdom of Myènè-speaking clans
- Capital: Sangatanga (royal seat)
- Common languages: Orungu (Myènè subgroup of Bantu)
- Religion: Traditional Orungu religion; later Christianity
- Government: Elective monarchy
- Agamwinboni
  - late 18th century: Renwombi-Mpolo
  - c. 1810–1840: Rogombé-Mpolo ("Pass-all")
  - fl. 1853: Ombango-Rogombe
- Historical era: Pre-colonial Africa
  - Consolidation of Myènè-speaking clans around Cape Lopez: c. 1700
  - Apogee of the Atlantic slave trade: c. 1810–1850
  - Treaty of cession with France: 1 June 1862
  - Formal renunciation of the slave trade: 1853
  - Monarchy disestablished by French colonial administration: 1927
- Currency: Iron bars, cowrie shells, European cloth, firearms
Succeeded by
French Gabon
- Today part of: Gabon

The Kingdom of Orungu (Royaume d'Orungu) was a small pre-colonial state of Myènè-speaking peoples on the Atlantic littoral of what is now Gabon in Central Africa. Centred on the Cape Lopez peninsula and the lower delta of the Ogooué River, the kingdom emerged around the beginning of the eighteenth century and survived until the French colonial administration formally abolished the monarchy in 1927.

A coastal thalassocracy whose authority rested on the control of riverine and maritime trade routes rather than on territorial conquest, the kingdom developed as one of three middleman polities of the northern Lower Guinea coast, alongside the Mpongwe of the Gabon Estuary and the Nkomi of Fernan Vaz Lagoon. Together these polities mediated commerce between inland producers and European shipping from the sixteenth to the mid-nineteenth century. Between the 1760s and the 1840s the kingdom became the principal Atlantic outlet for captives shipped from the northern Gabonese coast, exchanging slaves, ivory, dyewoods and beeswax for European textiles, firearms, alcohol and iron goods.

The kingdom reached its political and commercial apogee under rulers titled Agamwinboni (or agamwin) during the first half of the nineteenth century, notably under Renwombi-Mpolo and his successor Rogombé-Mpolo, known to European traders as "Pass-all". Following the formal abandonment of the slave trade in 1853 and the cession of Cape Lopez to France in 1862, the Orungu monarchy lost the fiscal base on which royal patronage had depended and entered a protracted decline that ended with the disestablishment of the kingship in 1927.

== Etymology and name ==
The kingdom takes its name from the Orungu (also rendered Oroungou, Orongou or, in older European sources, Orongous), one of six Myènè-speaking peoples of coastal Gabon, the others being the Mpongwe, Nkomi, Galoa, Adyumba and Enenga. Myènè is purely a linguistic designation, a subdivision of the western Bantu languages, and is sometimes employed in the literature as a collective ethnonym for these six communities, whose nineteenth-century settlements together formed an arc enclosing the modern cities of Libreville, Port-Gentil (the former Cape Lopez) and Lambaréné.

The royal title attested in nineteenth-century French and English sources is Agamwinboni (also recorded as agamwin), conventionally translated as "king" or "paramount chief". Henry H. Bucher and K. David Patterson both note that the term denoted both a religious–political office and the holder of a redistributive role over commercial revenues, particularly those derived from the Nazareth and São Mexias tributaries of the Ogooué estuary.

== Origins and formation ==
The Orungu are usually described as a Myènè-speaking people of uncertain remote origin who reached the Ogooué delta from the south at some point during the seventeenth century as part of the broader Bantu expansion into the equatorial forests of West Central Africa. Bucher's historiographical survey of Mpongwe origins emphasises that all six Myènè-speaking communities share a relatively recent and overlapping migration history, with traditions of fission and movement between the estuary and the Cape Lopez peninsula.

A centralised polity emerged among the Orungu clans of the lower Ogooué around the year 1700, when commercial competition with neighbouring Myènè groups and rising European demand for ivory and captives favoured the consolidation of a single royal office. Joseph Ambouroué-Avaro, a Gabonese historian whose posthumous 1981 monograph on the Lower Ogooué remains the standard French-language study of the kingdom, argued that the Orungu had already established themselves on the Cape Lopez–Omboué littoral well before this date. By the late seventeenth century they had, on his account, organised an economy combining sea fishing, dugout navigation, riverine portage and a structured monarchical political system.

== Geography ==
The kingdom occupied the Cape Lopez peninsula and the network of channels, lagoons and islands of the lower Ogooué delta, in what is today the Ogooué-Maritime Province of Gabon. Its territorial reach extended south along the Fernan Vaz Lagoon, which by the early nineteenth century supplied captives upstream to Orungu factories, and east up the main course of the Ogooué as far as the limits of Orungu commercial influence on the Nkomi and Galoa networks.

The principal Orungu settlement and royal seat was Sangatanga, a port town on the southern shore of the Cape Lopez peninsula and the main slaving entrepôt of the kingdom during its commercial apogee. Other Orungu trading sites lay along the Nazareth and São Mexias channels of the Ogooué estuary, where the agamwinboni levied tolls on river traffic carrying goods between the interior and European vessels anchored off Cape Lopez.

== Political organisation ==
The Orungu kingdom comprised an estimated twenty exogamous clans, organised in a hierarchy ascending from households and lineages to clans and finally to the kingdom as a whole. One royal clan provided the candidates for the kingship; the agamwinboni was selected from eligible male relatives by a council of clan elders, an arrangement that combined dynastic and elective principles and was intended to mitigate succession disputes.

Royal authority was redistributive rather than absolute. The king was the principal broker of overseas trade, fixed customary duties on commercial transactions, mediated disputes between clans and represented the kingdom in dealings with European captains and, after 1862, with French colonial officers. Population estimates for the kingdom at its height vary considerably; figures in the secondary literature place the directly governed Orungu population at around 5,000 in the early nineteenth century, with a far larger zone of commercial dependency extending into the interior.

== Economy and Atlantic trade ==
=== Sixteenth- to mid-eighteenth-century commerce ===
European captains, first Portuguese and then increasingly Dutch, English and French, had been anchoring off Cape Lopez since the sixteenth century, drawn by ivory, redwood and beeswax supplied by the Myènè communities of the coast. Before the mid-eighteenth century, the Orungu operated chiefly as a maritime relay: they exchanged ivory, dyewoods, salt, copper and raffia cloth with European ships and redistributed European textiles, iron and alcohol along the Ogooué and the Fernan Vaz lagoon.

The Gabonese coast, like the adjacent Loango Coast to the south, occupied a peripheral position in the early Atlantic slave trade compared with the Bight of Biafra or Kongo–Angola regions, and the volume of captives exported from Cape Lopez before the mid-eighteenth century remained modest.

=== Apogee of the slave trade, c. 1760–1840 ===
The Orungu kingdom became the dominant Atlantic outlet of the northern Gabonese coast in the second half of the eighteenth century, when rising demand from the sugar economies of Brazil and Cuba drew increasing numbers of slave ships into the Bight of Biafra and adjoining waters. By 1788, contemporary observers estimated that "Gabon and Cape Lopez" together embarked some 500 captives annually, a small share of the overall transatlantic traffic but enough to underwrite the political ascendancy of the Orungu ruling clan.

Patterson and Ambouroué-Avaro describe how the agamwinboni converted control over the slave trade into a fiscal monopoly: taxes were levied on every transaction at the Nazareth and São Mexias channels, while royal warehouses concentrated re-exportable European goods at Sangatanga. Captives were drawn primarily from the interior via Galoa and Nkomi intermediaries, but the Orungu also enslaved people judged to have transgressed local norms (debtors, those accused of witchcraft, and convicted adulterers) who were sold to Portuguese and, later, Brazilian buyers.

The peak of the Orungu Atlantic trade fell in the period c. 1810–1850. The partial suppression of the legal slave trade by the British West Africa Squadron had an unexpected effect on the kingdom: as more established ports such as Bonny and Loango came under closer Royal Navy scrutiny, Brazilian and Cuban shippers diverted contraband traffic to less heavily patrolled outlets, Cape Lopez among them. Dale Graden has documented that captives embarked at Cape Lopez in the 1840s were still being landed on the coast of Maranhão in northern Brazil at a time when British consular intervention was dismantling the contraband Atlantic networks.

== Notable rulers ==
The Orungu royal dynasty of the eighteenth and nineteenth centuries is generally referred to in the secondary literature by the patronymic Mpolo. The two best-documented incumbents are:

- Renwombi-Mpolo (also Reombi-Mpolo), reigning in the late eighteenth century, who consolidated Orungu paramountcy over the lower Ogooué and concentrated royal authority at Sangatanga.
- Rogombé-Mpolo, better known to European traders by his trade name "Pass-all", who reigned during the first half of the nineteenth century and presided over the kingdom's commercial apogee. Patterson identifies him as a leading Orungu interlocutor of Atlantic-Brazilian shipping interests during this period.

The last ruler of the autonomous kingdom is generally identified as Ombango-Rogombe (or Ndombe), under whom the Orungu monarchy formally renounced the slave trade in 1853 in an agreement with the French naval authorities at Libreville.

== Decline and French colonial absorption ==
The fall of the Kingdom of Orungu was driven less by military defeat than by the structural collapse of the Atlantic slave economy on which its political system had come to depend. The 1853 royal renunciation of the slave trade, made in part under French and British pressure and in part to preserve diplomatic standing with the new Libreville establishment, was ineffective in practice. Contraband shipments to Brazil continued well into the 1860s and 1870s and contributed to the persistence of the illegal transatlantic traffic in the region.

A treaty of cession concluded between France and the rulers of Cape Lopez on 1 June 1862 brought the kingdom formally within the French sphere of influence, alongside earlier acts of cession at Cape Estiéras (1852) and Elobey (1855). With the definitive suppression of the Atlantic slave trade by the early 1870s, royal patronage networks dependent on slaving revenues unravelled. The expeditions of Pierre Savorgnan de Brazza between 1875 and 1885 established direct French authority on the upper Ogooué and tied the Lower Ogooué firmly into the emerging colony of French Gabon.

The Orungu kingship survived in attenuated form under French administration as a chieftaincy of largely ceremonial significance, before being formally disestablished by colonial decree in 1927.

== Society and culture ==
Beyond the institutions of kingship and trade, the Orungu shared with their Myènè-speaking neighbours a kinship system organised around exogamous clans, a body of oral historical tradition recording clan origins and royal succession, and religious practices centred on ancestor veneration and the propitiation of water spirits associated with the Ogooué delta. American Protestant missionaries established themselves in the Gabon Estuary from 1842 onward and extended their activity into Orungu territory in subsequent decades, contributing both to the gradual Christianisation of the coast and to the documentary record of nineteenth-century Orungu society.

Joseph Ambouroué-Avaro's posthumous monograph offered an influential, if controversial, reinterpretation of pre-colonial Lower Ogooué society as fundamentally materialist and egalitarian in orientation, arguing that the Atlantic trade introduced enduring social inequalities that culminated in the cultural crisis of colonisation. The thesis has been contested by reviewers including Philippe Laburthe-Tolra and W. G. Clarence-Smith, who have noted its strongly deductive method and uneven engagement with the ethnographic literature, while acknowledging its status as the most ambitious synthesis of nineteenth-century Orungu history written from within Gabon.

== Historiography ==
Scholarly study of the Kingdom of Orungu has been shaped by three principal bodies of work. The first is the corpus of mission and travel sources produced by American Presbyterian missionaries and French naval officers operating in the Gabon Estuary and at Cape Lopez between the 1840s and 1880s. The second is the Anglophone academic literature of the 1970s, particularly K. David Patterson's Stanford doctoral dissertation of 1971 on the Mpongwe and the Orungu and his subsequent book The Northern Gabon Coast to 1875 (1975), together with Henry H. Bucher's Wisconsin doctoral dissertation on the Mpongwe (1977) and his article on Mpongwe origins (1975). Patterson's book was reviewed in major Africanist journals by Phyllis M. Martin and A. J. H. Latham, who emphasised its importance as the first systematic treatment of the northern Gabonese coast in English.

The third body of work is the Francophone scholarship rooted in Joseph Ambouroué-Avaro's 1981 Un peuple gabonais à l'aube de la colonisation, a major synthesis of Lower Ogooué history by a Gabonese historian, together with the comparative West-Central African studies of Jan Vansina, which situate the Orungu within the wider history of equatorial coastal polities. Phyllis M. Martin's External Trade of the Loango Coast (1972) supplies the regional commercial frame within which Orungu trade can be compared with the better-documented Loango system, while more recent work by Dale Graden has used British consular and Brazilian sources to reconstruct the post-1850 contraband slave trade out of Cape Lopez to the Empire of Brazil.

== See also ==
- History of Gabon
- Mpongwe
- Nkomi people
- Loango Kingdom
- Atlantic slave trade
- French Equatorial Africa
- Cape Lopez
- Ogooué River

== Bibliography ==
- Ambouroué-Avaro, Joseph (1981). Un peuple gabonais à l'aube de la colonisation: le Bas-Ogowé au XIXe siècle (in French). Paris: Karthala / Centre de Recherches Africaines.
- Bucher, Henry H. (1975). "Mpongwe Origins: Historiographical Perspectives". History in Africa. 2: 59–89. doi:10.2307/3171465. JSTOR 3171465.
- Bucher, Henry Hale (1977). The Mpongwe of the Gabon Estuary: A History to 1860 (PhD dissertation). University of Wisconsin–Madison.
- Clarence-Smith, W. G. (1982). "Review of Joseph Ambouroué-Avaro, Un peuple gabonais à l'aube de la colonisation: le Bas-Ogowe au XIXe siècle". Bulletin of the School of Oriental and African Studies. 45 (3): 635–636. doi:10.1017/S0041977X00042166.
- Graden, Dale (2020). "The Cape Lopez Africans at Maranhão: Geo-political literacy, British consuls, and the demise of the transatlantic slave trade to Brazil". Atlantic Studies. 17 (3): 309–328. doi:10.1080/14788810.2020.1735875.
- Laburthe-Tolra, Philippe (1984). "Review of Joseph Ambouroué-Avaro, Un peuple gabonais à l'aube de la colonisation: le Bas-Ogowe au XIXe siècle". Outre-Mers. Revue d'histoire (in French). 71 (262–263): 110–111.
- Latham, A. J. H. (1976). "Review of K. David Patterson, The Northern Gabon Coast to 1875". Bulletin of the School of Oriental and African Studies. 39 (1): 228–229. doi:10.1017/S0041977X0005268X.
- Martin, Phyllis M. (1972). The External Trade of the Loango Coast, 1576–1870: The Effects of Changing Commercial Relations on the Vili Kingdom of Loango. Oxford Studies in African Affairs. Oxford: Clarendon Press.
- Martin, Phyllis M. (1976). "Review of K. David Patterson, The Northern Gabon Coast to 1875". Journal of African History. 17 (3): 454–455. doi:10.1017/S0021853700000591.
- Patterson, Karl David (1971). The Mpongwe and the Orungu of the Gabon Coast 1815–1875: The Transition to Colonial Rule (PhD dissertation). Stanford University.
- Patterson, K. David (1975). The Northern Gabon Coast to 1875. Oxford Studies in African Affairs. Oxford: Clarendon Press.
- Sutton, Angela C. (2023). Pirates of the Slave Trade: The Battle of Cape Lopez and the Birth of an American Institution. Lanham, MD: Prometheus / Globe Pequot. ISBN 978-1-63388-844-9.
- Vansina, Jan (1990). Paths in the Rainforests: Toward a History of Political Tradition in Equatorial Africa. Madison: University of Wisconsin Press.
