= Buissi people =

The Babuissi are an ethnic group of Gabon and the Republic of the Congo. Linguistically part of the Eshira, they live mostly in the upper basin of the Nyanga River.
