= IMBA =

IMBA can refer to:

- Institute of Molecular Biotechnology, Vienna, Austria
- International Masters of Business Administration
- International Mountain Bicycling Association
- Gaming slang for game imbalance
- Tony Anak Imba, a Malaysian who was serving a life sentence with caning in Singapore for murder since 2014.

== See also ==
- Himba (disambiguation)
