= Adyumba people =

Ethnic group in Gabon

The Adyumba or Adjumba are a Bantu ethnic group in Gabon. They live mainly near Lake Azingo and in the Middle Ogooué River in the west coast of the country. They belong to the Myènè people and also speak the Myènè language of the Bantu languages. Their neighbors include the Mpongwe people (who they were historically considered a clan of) and the Nkomi people. Today most live by fishing, food crops and small businesses.

== Bibliography ==
- (in English) David E. Gardinier, Historical dictionary of Gabon, Scarecrow Press, Metuchen, Londres, 1994, 466 p.
- (in English) Karl David Patterson, The northern Gabon coast to 1875, Clarendon Press, Oxford, 1975, 167 p.
- (in French) Albert Aléwina Chavihot et Jean-Avéno Davin, Les Adyumba du Gabon : de la petite valise de Nènè, Éditions Raponda Walker, Libreville, 2000, 196 p.
- (in French) Elikia M'Bokolo, Noirs et blancs en Afrique équatoriale : les sociétés côtières et la pénétration française, vers 1820-1874, Éditions de l'École des hautes études en sciences sociales, 1981, 302 p.
