= Ngubi language =

Bantu language of Gabon

Ngubi
- Ngove
- Native to: Gabon
- Language family: Niger–Congo?: Atlantic–Congo; Benue–Congo; Bantoid; Bantu (Zone B); Sira (B.40); Ngubi

Language codes
- ISO 639-3: None (mis)
- Glottolog: ngub1239
- Guthrie code: B.404

Ngubi (Ngove) is a minor Bantu language of Gabon.
