= BWZ =

BWZ can refer to:

- Bwisi language, spoken in the Republic of Congo and in Ghana
- Soil value (German: Bodenwertzahl), a way to measure soil quality in Germany
- Training and Knowledge Centre, a subordinate agency of the German Federal Ministry of Finance
- University of Vienna - Business Center, located in the Floridsdorf district of Vienna, Austria
