= Pinji language =

Bantu language of Gabon

Pinzi
- Pinji
- Native to: Gabon
- Native speakers: 1,000 (2007)
- Language family: Niger–Congo?: Atlantic–Congo; Benue–Congo; Bantoid; Bantu (Zone B); Tsogo languages (B.30); Pinzi

Language codes
- ISO 639-3: pic
- Glottolog: pinj1243
- Guthrie code: B.304
- ELP: Pinji

Pinzi (Pinji: Apinji, Gapinji) is a Bantu language of Gabon.
