= Vove language =

Language

Vove
- ɣè-βòβè
- Native to: Gabon
- Native speakers: 4,000 (2007)
- Language family: Niger–Congo?: Atlantic–Congo; Benue–Congo; Bantoid; Bantu (Zone B); Tsogo languages (B.30); Vove

Language codes
- ISO 639-3: buw
- Glottolog: bubi1250
- Guthrie code: B.305

Vove (also rendered Bhubhi, Bubi, Pove) is a Bantu language of Gabon.

== Phonology ==
See Phonology of the Tsogo languages.
