= Mpongwe people =

Bantu ethnic group of northwest Gabon

Mpongwe
Regions with significant populations
- Gabon: 60,000

Languages
- Mpongwe, French

Related ethnic groups
- Myènè, Orungu

The Mpongwe are an ethnic group in Gabon, notable as the earliest known dwellers around the estuary where Libreville is now located.

== History ==
The Mpongwe language identifies them as a subgroup of the Myènè people of the Bantus, who are believed to have been in the area for some 2,000 years, although the Mpongwe clans likely began arriving in only the 16th century, possibly in order to take advantage of trading opportunities offered by visiting Europeans. The Mpongwe gradually became the middlemen between the coast and the interior peoples such as the Bakèlè and Séké. From about the 1770s, the Mpongwe also became involved in the slave trade. In the 1830s, Mpongwe trade consisted of slaves, dyewood, ebony, rubber, ivory, and gum copal in exchange for cloth, iron, firearms, and various forms of alcoholic drink.

In the 1840s, at the time of the arrival of American missionaries and French naval forces, the Mpongwe consisted of 6,000-7,000 free persons and 6,000 slaves, organized into about two dozen clans. Four of these clans were preeminent; the Asiga and Agulamba on the south shore, and the Agekaza-Glass and Agekaza-Quaben on the north shore. Each of these clans was ruled by an oga, translated as "king" by Europeans, although clan leadership was largely oligarchic.

The Mpongwe engaged in extensive coastal trade across the Central African coast. An account of this trade includes that of Paul Du Chaillu in the mid-19th century. Mpongwe boats could be 60 feet in length, $3\tfrac{1}{2}$ in breadth and 3 feet deep. Larger vessels included masts and sails made of woven palm fronds, with a load capacity of 8–10 tons.

=== French colonial rule ===
The French took advantage of longstanding inter-clan rivalry to establish a foothold; while "King Denis" (Antchouwé Kowe Rapontchombo) of the Asigas talked the French out of using his clan's area, "King Glass" (R'Ogouarowe) of the Agekaza-Glass submitted only after a bombardment in 1845, and "King Louis" (Anguilè Ré-Dowé) of Agekaza-Quaben ceded his village of Okolo and moved, leaving the French to establish Fort d'Aumale on the village's site in 1843.

The combination of slave trade suppression and direct contact by Europeans with the interior reduced Mpongwe fortunes, but at the same time missionary schools enabled young Mpongwe to work in the colonial government and enterprise. The population declined greatly as a result of smallpox, and an 1884 estimate lists only about 3,000 Mpongwe. Fang migration pressure converted many Mpongwe to urban life in the early 20th century, and they came to be leaders in both the French colony and independent Gabon.

=== Social relations with Europeans ===
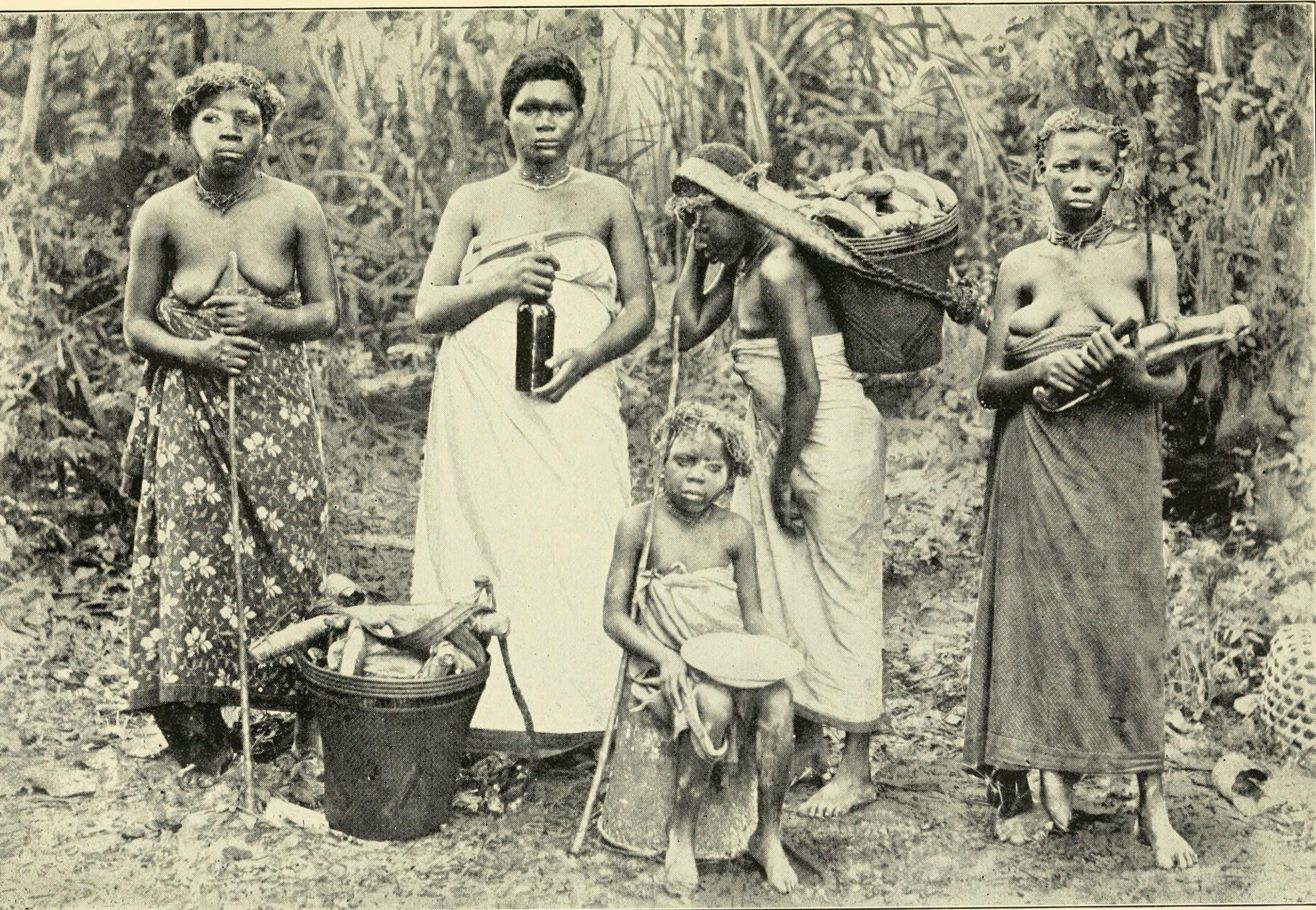
Njembe, female secret society, Mpongwe, Gabon

As African and European communities converged along the coast, the Mpongwé adjusted traditional practices to incorporate interracial relationships between Mpongwé women and European men. By mid 19th century, it was commonplace for Mpongwé women to engage in sexual and domestic acts with European men in exchange for a bridewealth. As a result of centuries of contact with the Europeans, a mixed-race population emerged: the métis. Métis could be found in almost every Mpongwé family during this time. Mpongwé families even encouraged their daughters to engage with European men. Such unions were not considered legitimate marriages under French law, but were in Mpongwé communities as long as family consent and a bridewealth were given. These marriages provided an avenue for women to acquire property and to obtain French citizenship. As these interracial unions continued into the 20th century, African and French societies sought to restrict these unions as Mpongwé women began to claim their European ancestry as a means to assert their voice in society. The métis population not only confronted gender roles within the African community, but also challenged the permeability of social and legal hierarchies under colonial rule.

=== Notable people ===
- Jean-Rémy Bessieux (24 December 1803 – 30 April 1876) - missionary and linguist who published a Pongwe dictionary in 1847.
- Simone Saint-Dénis (1930-2008) - Gabonese trade union leader
