= Anguilè Ré-Dowé =

19th century Mpongwe leader

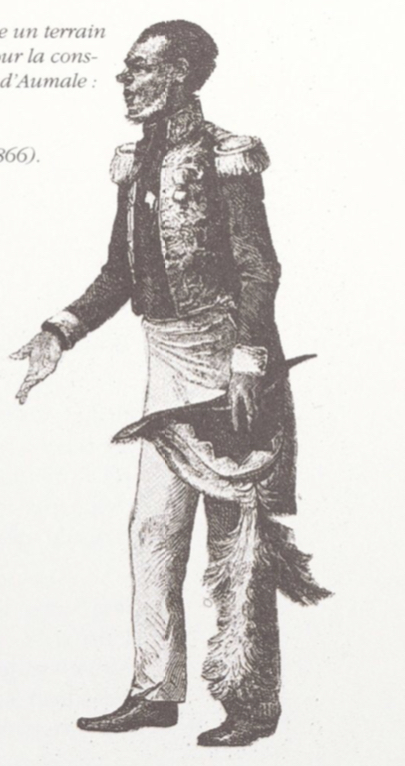
- Died: 1867
- Occupation: village leader

Anguilè Ré-Dowé also known as "King Louis", was Mpongwe village leader of Agekaza-Quaben in the 19th century. In 1842, he ceded sovereignty over his territories to the French. He was the nephew of King Quaben (or Kaka-Rapono), the head of the clan.

== Biography ==
His exact date of birth is unknown. He was born in the village of Okolo (now called Sainte-Marie). His mother is said to be an Aguékaza woman given in marriage to an Agungu man but she was recalled by her clan while she was pregnant. He was then adopted by King R’Ogayoni, a Mpongwè king of the Aguékaza clan.

He is known for having signed a treaty on 18 March 1842 that allowed the French to settle on the northern bank of the estuary. Unlike the treaty of 1839, signed by Antchouwé Kowe Rapontchombo, "King Denis", the treaty with King Louis mentions a transfer of sovereignty and stipulates that the French will from then on be the only ones able to fly a flag on this territory. This makes it a crucial event in the French conquest of Gabon. The following year, the French settled on the bank and founded Fort D’Aumale. Ré-Dowé established his new village north of Okolo.

He died in 1867 and was buried in his village, near his hut. A cement tomb was built in 1946 by his great-grandchildren.

== Legacy ==
Ré-Dowé's village has been called "Louis" since the 19th century. With the expansion and development of Libreville, the village became the Louis district, known for its bars and nightclubs. A road in the district also bears his name.

== Sources ==
- Deschamps, Hubert (1963). "Quinze ans de Gabon" (fac-similé). Revue française d'histoire d'outre-mer (in French). 50 (180–181): 283-345. doi:10.3406/outre.1963.1380.
- Raponda-Walker, André (1960). Notes d'histoire du Gabon. Montpellier.
- Rossatanga-Rignault, Guy (2015). Les grandes dates du Gabon: abrégé chronologique illustré. Libreville, Gabon: Editions Raponda-Walker. ISBN 9782354950262.
