= Himba =

Himba may refer to:

== Gabon ==
- Himba language

== Angola and Namibia ==
- Himba people
- Himba, the dialect of Herero language spoken by the Himba people
