= Telephone numbers in Gabon =

- Country: Gabon
- Continent: Africa
- Country code: 241
- International access: 00
- Long-distance: 0

The following are the telephone codes in Gabon.

== Calling formats ==
The NSN length is seven digits. To call Gabon, the following format is used:

- 0X XX XX XX - calling within Gabon
- +241 0X XX XX XX - calling from outside Gabon

As from 0000 hours on 12 July 2019:

- current 01 71 71 71 becomes 011 71 71 71; - current 02 04 04 04 becomes 062 04 04 04; - current 04 08 14 14 becomes 074 08 14 14; - current 05 05 05 05 becomes 065 05 05 05; - current 06 11 11 11 becomes 066 11 11 11; - current 07 28 01 50 becomes 077 28 01 50.

For any additional information, please contact the call centres on the following numbers: 222 (Libertis and Moov), 111 (AIRTEL) and 8484 (ARCEP).

== List of allocations in Gabon ==
A new number plan took effect in 2012.

GENERAL NUMBER PLAN
Usage	Prefix	Operator
PSTN Fixed lines	01	GABON TELECOM S.A.
Mobile operators	02	LIBERTIS
Mobile operators	03	AZUR (USAN Gabon)
Mobile operators	04	Airtel (CELTEL)
Mobile operators	05	MOOV (Atlantique Télécom Gabon)
Mobile operators	06	LIBERTIS
Mobile operators	07	Airtel (CELTEL)
Value-added services	8	Intelligent networks (various)
Spare	9	available for identification of other services

LIST OF FIXED ALLOCATIONS
Provinces	Old number	New number	Towns/cities
Libreville	+241 44 XX XX	+241 01 44 XX XX	Libreville
Libreville	+241 45 XX XX	+241 01 45 XX XX	Libreville
Libreville	+241 46 XX XX	+241 01 46 XX XX	Libreville
Libreville	+241 47 XX XX	+241 01 47 XX XX	Libreville
Libreville	+241 48 XX XX	+241 01 48 XX XX	Libreville
Libreville	+241 70 XX XX	+241 01 70 XX XX	Libreville
Libreville	+241 71 XX XX	+241 01 71 XX XX	Libreville
Libreville	+241 72 XX XX	+241 01 72 XX XX	Libreville
Libreville	+241 73 XX XX	+241 01 73 XX XX	Libreville
Libreville	+241 74 XX XX	+241 01 74 XX XX	Libreville
Libreville	+241 75 XX XX	+241 01 75 XX XX	Libreville
Libreville	+241 76 XX XX	+241 01 76 XX XX	Libreville
Libreville	+241 77 XX XX	+241 01 77 XX XX	Libreville
Libreville	+241 78 XX XX	+241 01 78 XX XX	Libreville
Libreville	+241 79 XX XX	+241 01 79 XX XX	Libreville
Estuaire	+241 40 XX XX	+241 01 40 XX XX	Kango
Estuaire	+241 42 0X XX	+241 01 42 0X XX	Ntoum
Estuaire	+241 42 4X XX	+241 01 42 4X XX	Cocobeach
Haut Ogooué	+241 60 XX XX	+241 01 60 XX XX	Ngouoni
Haut Ogooué	+241 62 XX XX	+241 01 62 XX XX	Mounana
Haut Ogooué	+241 66 XX XX	+241 01 66 XX XX	Moanda
Haut Ogooué	+241 67 XX XX	+241 01 67 XX XX	Franceville
Haut Ogooué	+241 69 XX XX	+241 01 69 XX XX	Léconi
Haut Ogooué	+241 69 XX XX	+241 01 69 XX XX	Akiéni
Haut Ogooué	+241 69 XX XX	+241 01 69 XX XX	Okondja
Moyen Ogooué	+241 58 XX XX	+241 01 58 XX XX	Lambaréné
Moyen Ogooué	+241 59 XX XX	+241 01 59 XX XX	Ndjolé
Ngounié	+241 86 XX XX	+241 01 86 XX XX	Mouila
Nyanga	+241 82 XX XX	+241 01 82 XX XX	Tchibanga
Nyanga	+241 83 XX XX	+241 01 83 XX XX	Mayumba
Ogooué Ivindo	+241 90 XX XX	+241 01 90 XX XX	Makokou
Ogooué Ivindo	+241 92 XX XX	+241 01 92 XX XX	Mékambo
Ogooué Ivindo	+241 93 XX XX	+241 01 93 XX XX	Booué
Ogooué Lolo	+241 65 XX XX	+241 01 65 XX XX	Koulamoutou
Ogooué Lolo	+241 64 XX XX	+241 01 64 XX XX	Lastourville
Ogooué Maritime	+241 50 XX XX	+241 01 50 XX XX	Gamba
Ogooué Maritime	+241 54 XX XX	+241 1 54 XX XX	Omboué
Ogooué Maritime	+241 55 XX XX	+241 01 55 XX XX	Port-Gentil
Ogooué Maritime	+241 56 XX XX	+241 01 56 XX XX	Port-Gentil
Woleu Ntem	+241 96 XX XX	+241 01 96 XX XX	Bitam
Woleu Ntem	+241 98 XX XX	+241 01 98 XX XX	Oyem

SPECIAL SERVICES
Service	Numbering
Faults	19BP
Enquiries	12
Electronic directory	11
International enquiries	16
Mobile security	1718
Police	1730
Fire service	18
Police station	1710
Medical emergencies	1300 to 1399
National manual exchange	10
