= Tsogo languages =

Clade of Bantu languages

Tsogo
- Okani
- Linguistic classification: Niger–Congo?: Atlantic–Congo; Benue–Congo; Southern Bantoid; Bantu (Zone B.30); Kele–Tsogo?; Tsogo

Language codes
- ISO 639-3: –
- Glottolog: tsog1242

The Tsogo languages are a clade of Bantu languages coded Zone B.30 in Guthrie's classification. According to Nurse & Philippson (2003), the languages form a valid node. They are:

Tsogo (Getsogo), Himba (Simba), Pinzi, Vove, Kande

Nurse & Philippson also include (B.10) Myene, following Piron (1997), who makes Tsogo and Myene together a divergent branch of Bantu. Maho adds Viya (Eviya) and Bongwe.

== Phonology ==
=== Consonants ===
		Labial	Coronal	Dorsal
Plosives	Affricate	ts		
Plosives	Palatalized	d^{j}		
Plosives	Voiceless	p	t	k
Plosives	Voiced	b	d	
Plosives	Prenasalized	^{m}b	^{n}d	^{ŋ}g
Fricatives	Voiceless	f	s	
Fricatives	Voiced	β	ɣ	
Fricatives	Prenasalized	(^{m}f)	^{n}z	
Nasals		m	n	ɲ
Liquid		l		
Rhotic	Trill(?)	r		
Approximants		w	j	

=== Vowels ===
	Front	Back
Close	i	u
Near-close		ʊ
Close-mid	e	o
Open/Open-mid	a	ɔ
