= Barama language =

Bantu language spoken in Gabon

Varama
- Barama
- Native to: Gabon
- Native speakers: 1,000 (2007)
- Language family: Niger–Congo?: Atlantic–Congo; Benue–Congo; Bantoid; Bantu (Zone B); Sira (B.40); Varama

Language codes
- ISO 639-3: bbg
- Glottolog: bara1362
- Guthrie code: B.402

Varama (Barama) is a Bantu language of Gabon.
