= Mbere language =

Bantu language spoken in Congo and Gabon

Mbere
- Mbete, Limbede
- Native to: Congo, Gabon
- Ethnicity: Ambede
- Native speakers: (110,000 cited 2000)
- Language family: Niger–Congo?: Atlantic–Congo; Benue–Congo; Bantoid; Bantu (Zone B); Mbete languages (B.60); Mbere
- Dialects: Ngwii

Language codes
- ISO 639-3: mdt
- Glottolog: mber1257
- Guthrie code: B.61

Mbere (Mbede, Mbete) is a Bantu language spoken in the Republic of Congo and Gabon.
