= Sira languages =

Shira
- Linguistic classification: Niger–Congo?: Atlantic–Congo; Benue–Congo; Southern Bantoid; Bantu (Zone B.40); Shira

Language codes
- Glottolog: sira1268 (deprecated) yomb1244 (Yombe) vili1240 (Vilic)

The Sira languages are a clade of Bantu languages coded Zone B.40 in Guthrie's classification. According to Nurse & Philippson (2003), together with a couple languages from H10, they form a valid node. They are:

(B.40) Punu, Bwisi, Varama, Vungu, Shira–Bwali, Sangu, Lumbu, (H.10) Vili, Kunyi.

Maho (2009) adds Ngubi.

In addition, the unclassified Pygmy language Rimba (Irimba) is generally assumed to be a dialect of Punu.
