= Kele–Tsogo languages =

Bantu languages group

Kele–Tsogo
- Linguistic classification: Niger–Congo?: Atlantic–Congo; Benue–Congo; Southern Bantoid; Bantu (Zone B); Kele–Tsogo
- Subdivisions: Myene; Kele; Tsogo

Language codes
- ISO 639-3: –
- Glottolog: None

Kele–Tsogo is a proposed intermediate group of Bantu languages, coded Zone B.10–30 in Guthrie's classification. According to Nurse & Philippson (2003), they are:

- Kele (B.20)
- Tsogo–Myene
  - Myene (B.10)
  - Tsogo (B.30)
