= Viya language =

Endangered Bantu language spoken in Gabon

Viya
- Eviya
- Native to: Gabon
- Ethnicity: 400 Eviya (2013)
- Native speakers: 50 (2013)
- Language family: Niger–Congo?: Atlantic–Congo; Benue–Congo; Bantoid; Bantu (Zone B); Tsogo languages (B.30); Viya

Language codes
- ISO 639-3: gev
- Glottolog: eviy1235
- Guthrie code: B.301
- ELP: Geviya

Viya (Gheviya, Eviya, Avias) is a minor Bantu language of Gabon. A collection of proverbs in their language has been published, with French translations. Also, a bilingual dictionary has been compiled.
