= Himba language =

Moribund Bantu language spoken in Gabon

Himba
- Simba
- Himbaka
- Native to: Gabon
- Native speakers: 100 (2007)
- Language family: Niger–Congo?: Atlantic–Congo; Benue–Congo; Bantoid; Bantu (Zone B); Tsogo languages (B.30); Himba

Language codes
- ISO 639-3: sbw
- Glottolog: simb1254
- Guthrie code: B.302
- ELP: Simba

Himba (Himbaka), also known as Simba, is a moribund Bantu language of Gabon.
