= Bwisi language =

Bantu language spoken in the Republic of Congo

Bwisi
- Native to: Congo, Gabon
- Native speakers: (4,300 cited 2000)
- Language family: Niger–Congo?: Atlantic–Congo; Benue–Congo; Bantoid; Bantu (Zone B); Sira (B.40); Bwisi

Language codes
- ISO 639-3: bwz
- Glottolog: bwis1242
- Guthrie code: B.401
- ELP: Bwisi

Bwisi (also known as Ibwisi, Mbwisi) is a language spoken mainly in the Kibangou District (Niari Region) of the Republic of Congo, next to the Gabon border, where it is also spoken by a minority. According to the Ethnologue, approximately 4,250 people speak the language today worldwide.
