= Kande language =

Bantu language spoken in Gabon

Kande
- Native to: Gabon
- Ethnicity: Okandé
- Native speakers: 500 (2007)
- Language family: Niger–Congo?: Atlantic–Congo; Benue–Congo; Bantoid; Bantu (Zone B); Tsogo languages (B.30); Kande

Language codes
- ISO 639-3: kbs
- Glottolog: kand1300
- Guthrie code: B.32
- ELP: Kande

Kande is an undocumented Bantu language of Gabon.
