= Shira people =

Shira
Total population
- 74,000

Languages
- Shira

Religion
- Catholicism

The Sira or Shira people, the Eshira, are a Punu ethnic group of Gabon primarily living in the forests and grasslands south of the Ogooué River and west of its tributary the N'Gounié.

== Origin and Ethnogenesis ==
According to the oral tradition of the Sira or Punu 9 clans they migrated from the North via Egypt to Nubia where they settled in Merowé near the junctures of the Sira and Nile river between -500 BC and 100 AD. There by the Sira river was the place where they got that name from. From the 6th to the 18th century they migrated from Nubia via Uganda and DRC into their actual area, after wars with other groups. During the 19th century they traded Copper, and were highly regarded for their tobacco and raphia cloth. Their numbers were greatly reduced by smallpox epidemics in 1865 and 1898.

Paul du Chaillu travelled through Eshira areas in 1858 and 1864, and recorded that each clan controlled its own affairs. Mulenda of the Kamba clan was the most important of the chiefs; he owned 300–400 slaves, and died of smallpox in 1885. The Holy Ghost Fathers established a mission in 1895.

Subgroups of the Eshira include the Punu.
