= Vumbu language =

Bantu language spoken in Gabon

Vungu
- Vumbu
- Native to: Gabon
- Native speakers: 5,000 (2007)
- Language family: Niger–Congo?: Atlantic–Congo; Benue–Congo; Bantoid; Bantu (Zone B); Sira (B.40); Vungu

Language codes
- ISO 639-3: vum
- Glottolog: vumb1238
- Guthrie code: B.403
- ELP: Vumbu

Vungu, or Vumbu, is a Bantu language of Gabon.
