= Myene language =

Bantu language spoken in Gabon

Myene
- Omyene
- Native to: Gabon
- Region: Ogooue-Maritime Province, Middle Ogooue Province
- Ethnicity: Myene (Mpongwe, Adyumba, Nkomi, Galwa), Bongo
- Native speakers: 45,000 (2007)
- Language family: Niger–Congo?: Atlantic–Congo; Benue–Congo; Bantoid; Bantu (Zone B); Kele–Tsogo?; Tsogo?; Myene
- Dialects: Mpongwe; Orungu; Galwa; Nkomi

Language codes
- ISO 639-3: mye
- Glottolog: myen1241
- Guthrie code: B.11

Myene is a cluster of closely related Bantu varieties spoken in Gabon by about 46,000 people. It is perhaps the most divergent of the Narrow Bantu languages, though Nurse & Philippson (2003) place it in with the Tsogo languages (B.30). The more distinctive varieties are Mpongwe (Pongoué), Galwa (Galloa), and Nkomi.

== Phonology ==
Consonants
		Bilabial	Labio- dental	Alveolar	Palatal	Velar
Nasal		m		n	ɲ	ŋ
Stop/ Affricate	voiceless	p		t	tʃ	k
Stop/ Affricate	voiced	b		d	dʒ	ɡ
Stop/ Affricate	prenasal vl.	ᵐp		ⁿt	ᶮtʃ	ᵑk
Stop/ Affricate	prenasal vd.	ᵐb		ⁿd	ᶮdʒ	ᵑg
Fricative	voiceless		f	s	ʃ	
Fricative	voiced	β	v	z		(ɣ)
Approximant				l	j	w
Trill				r		

- /ɡ/ is also heard as [ɣ] in free variation when preceding vowels or semivowels depending on articulation.
- Voiced sounds /b, d, dʒ/ may also be heard as implosives [ɓ, ɗ, ɗ̠ʲ] in free variation across dialects.
- In the Adyumba dialect /dʒ/ may also be heard as [dz] in free variation.
- Sounds /ᶮtʃ, ᶮdʒ/ may also be heard as prenasal alveolar affricates [ⁿts, ⁿdz] across dialects.
- /w/ may be heard as more palatal [ɥ] when before front vowel sounds.
- A nasalized labio-velar sound /w̃/ may also be attested in the Mpongwe dialect.

Vowels
	Front	Back
Close	i	u
Close-mid	e	o
Open-mid	ɛ	ɔ
Open	a	

== Dictionary ==
Jean-Rémy Bessieux published a Pongwe dictionary in 1847.

== Bibliography ==
- Ambouroue, Odette (2007). Éléments de description de l'Orungu: Langue bantu du Gabon (B11b). Brussels: Université Libre de Bruxelles dissertation.
- Eyang Effa, Edwige (2002). Phonologie du myen'orungu, langue bantoue du Gabon B11b. Libreville: Université Omar Bongo.
- Jacquot, A. (1976) Etude de la phonologie et de la morphologie myene, in Etudes Bantoues II, Bulletin SELAF 53, Paris, 13–79.
- Patrick Mouguiama Daouda (1988). Éléments de description du mpongwe : Phonologie, morphologie du système nominal et pronominal (mémoire de maîtrise). Université Omar Bongo. 154 p
- Philippson, G. & G. Puech (1996) 'Tonal domains in Galwa (Bantu, B11c)' The Bantu languages
- Soumaho Ditoubilianou, Prisca Armelle (2001). Esquisse d'une phonologie fonctionnelle du Galwa. Libreville: Université Omar Bongo.
- Teisseres, Urbain (1957). Méthode pratique pour apprendre l'omyènè. 2nd edn. Paris: Société des Missions Evangéliques
