= Sangu language (Gabon) =

Bantu language of southern Gabon

Sangu
- Isangu
- Native to: Gabon
- Native speakers: 30,000 (2007)
- Language family: Niger–Congo?: Atlantic–Congo; Benue–Congo; Bantoid; Bantu (Zone B); Sira (B.40); Sangu

Language codes
- ISO 639-3: snq
- Glottolog: sang1333
- Guthrie code: B.42

Sangu (also spelled Chango, Isangu, Shango, Yisangou, and Yisangu) is a language spoken in Gabon by approximately 20,900 (2000) Masangu people.

== Bibliography ==
- Daniel Franck Idiata, 2006. Parlons isangu. (L'Harmattan)
