= Shira language =

Bantu language of Gabon

Shira
- Eshira
- Native to: Gabon
- Ethnicity: Shira people
- Native speakers: (39,000 cited 2000)
- Language family: Niger–Congo?: Atlantic–Congo; Benue–Congo; Bantoid; Bantu (Zone B); Sira (B.40); Shira

Language codes
- ISO 639-3: swj
- Glottolog: sira1266
- Guthrie code: B.41,411

Shira is a Bantu language of Gabon.

Maho (2009) considers Bwali to be a closely related language. Bwali does not have an ISO code.

== See also ==
- Sira languages
