= Lumbu language =

Bantu language spoken in Gabon and the Republic of Congo

Lumbu
- Ilumbu
- Native to: Gabon, Republic of the Congo
- Ethnicity: Balumbu, Babongo Pygmies
- Native speakers: (23,000 cited 2000)
- Language family: Niger–Congo?: Atlantic–Congo; Benue–Congo; Bantoid; Bantu (Zone B); Sira (B.40); Lumbu

Language codes
- ISO 639-3: lup
- Glottolog: lumb1249
- Guthrie code: B.44

Lumbu is a Bantu language spoken in Gabon and the Republic of the Congo.
