= Gabon =

Country in Central Africa

Gabonese Republic République gabonaise (French)
- Flag Coat of arms
- Motto: "Union, Travail, Justice" (French) "Union, Work, Justice"
- Anthem: "La Concorde" (French) "The Concord"
- Capital and largest city: Libreville; 0°23′N 9°27′E
- Official languages: French
- Regional languages: List: French; Fang; Mbete; Myene; Nzebi; Punu; Teke; Vili
- Ethnic groups: Fang; Punu; Nzebi; Teke; Myene; Kota; Vili; Mbama; and 42 others
- Religion (2021): 80.2% Christianity; 10.8% Islam; 7.0% no religion; 1.1% traditional faiths; 0.9% others
- Demonyms: Gabonese; Gabonaise
- Government: Unitary presidential republic
  - President: Brice Oligui Nguema
  - Vice President: Alexandre Barro Chambrier
  - Vice President of the Government: Hermann Immongault
- Legislature: Parliament
  - Upper house: Senate
  - Lower house: National Assembly

Independence from France
  - Administrated under the French Congo: 1882–1910
  - Re-established as French Gabon under the administration of French Equatorial Africa: 1910–1958
  - Republic established: 28 November 1958
  - Independence Granted: 17 August 1960
  - 1964 coup d'état: 17–19 February 1964
  - 2023 coup d'état: 30 August 2023

Area
  - Total: 267,668 km^{2} (103,347 sq mi) (76th)
  - Water (%): 3.76%

Population
  - 2026 estimate: ▲2,647,400 (139th)
  - Density: 10/km^{2} (25.9/sq mi) (216th)
- GDP (PPP): 2025 estimate
  - Total: ▲$57.054 billion (130th)
  - Per capita: ▲$24,739 (79th)
- GDP (nominal): 2025 estimate
  - Total: ▲$21.455 billion (131st)
  - Per capita: ▲$11,034 (86th)
- Gini (2017): ▼38 medium inequality
- HDI (2023): ▲0.733 high (108th)
- Currency: Central African CFA franc (XAF)
- Time zone: UTC+1 (WAT)
- Calling code: +241
- ISO 3166 code: GA
- Internet TLD: .ga

Gabon, (Note: (/ɡəˈbɒn/ gə-BON; French pronunciation: [ɡabɔ̃])) officially the Gabonese Republic, (Note: (French: République gabonaise)) is a country on the Atlantic coast of Central Africa, lying on the equator. It is bordered by Equatorial Guinea to the northwest, Cameroon to the north, the Republic of the Congo to the east and south, while sharing a maritime border with São Tomé and Príncipe to the west in the Gulf of Guinea. It has an area of 270,000 square kilometres (100,000 sq mi) and a population of 2.6 million people. There are coastal plains, mountains (the Crystal Mountains and the Chaillu Massif in the centre), and savanna in the east. Libreville is the capital and largest city; other major cities include Port-Gentil and Franceville.

Gabon's original inhabitants were the Bambenga. In the 13th century BCE, Bantu migrants began settling in the area. The Kingdom of Orungu was established around 1700. France colonised the region in the late 19th century. Since its independence from France in 1960, Gabon has had four presidents. In the 1990s, it introduced a multi-party system and a democratic constitution that aimed for a more transparent electoral process and reformed some governmental institutions. Despite this, the Gabonese Democratic Party remained the dominant party until its removal from power during the 2023 Gabonese coup d'état.

Gabon is a developing country, ranking 108th in the Human Development Index. It is one of the wealthiest countries in Africa in terms of per capita income; however, large parts of the population are very poor. Omar Bongo came to office in 1967 and created a dynasty which stabilized its power through a client network, Françafrique.

The official language is French, and Bantu ethnic groups constitute around 95% of the population. Christianity is the predominant religion, practised by about 80% of the population. With petroleum and foreign private investment, it has the fourth highest HDI (after Mauritius, Seychelles, and South Africa) and the fifth highest GDP per capita (PPP) of the Sub-Saharan African nations. Gabon's nominal GDP per capita was $10,149 in 2023. As of 2024, 91% of Gabon's population lives in urban areas, making it the most urbanised country in Africa.

== Etymology ==
The country's name derives from the Portuguese word "gabao" (also spelled "Gabão"), meaning "hooded cloak". Portuguese navigators in the 1470s applied the term to the Komo River estuary, whose outline they thought resembled a cloak; the usage later extended to the surrounding region and eventually the modern state.

== History ==
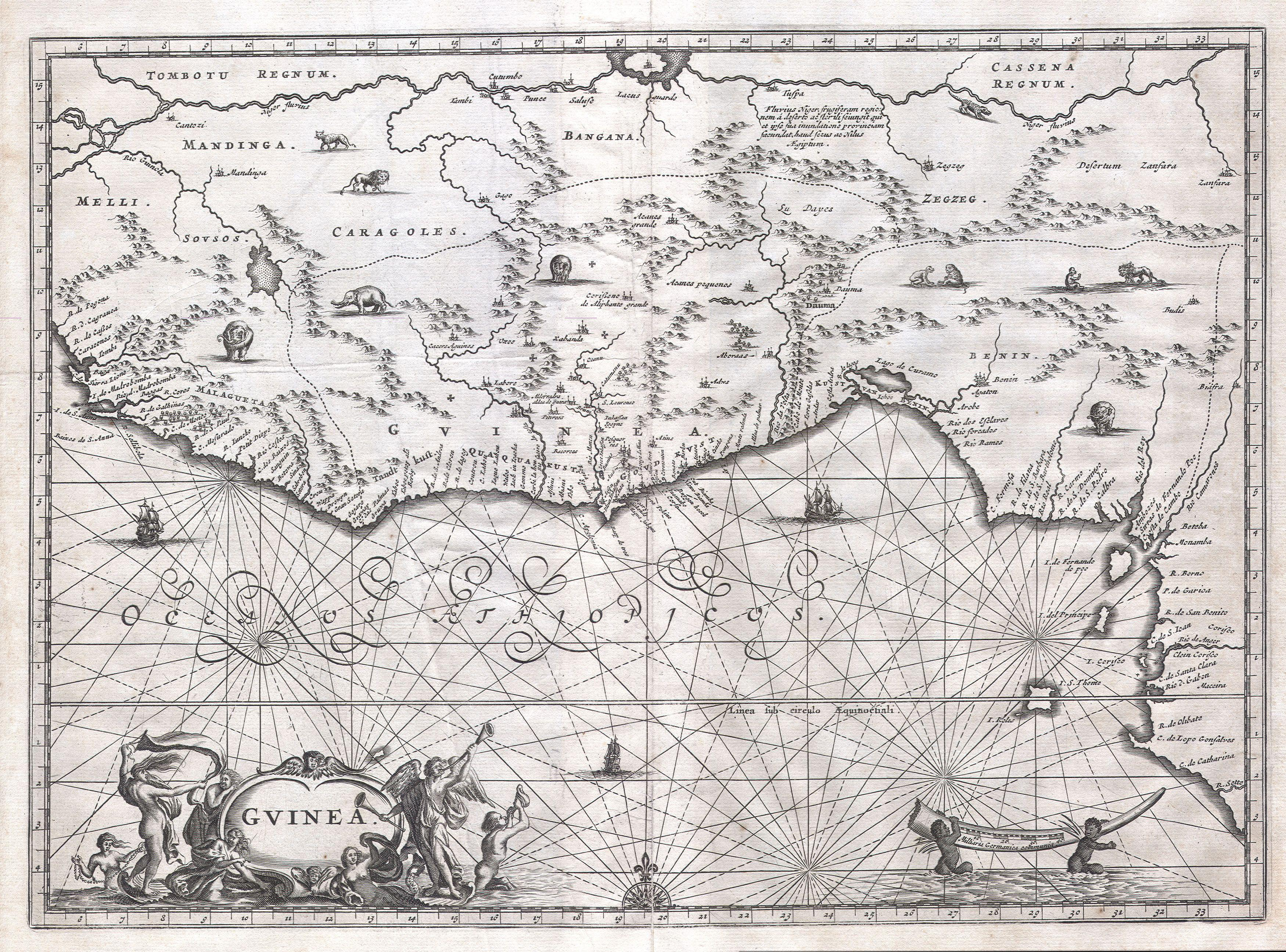
A map of West Africa in 1676

=== Pre-colonisation ===
The prehistoric inhabitants of Gabon were rainforest hunter-gatherer peoples collectively known as the Bambenga. In the 13th century BCE, Bantu migrants began settling in the area and formed early agricultural communities. With the development of ironworking in the 7th century CE, Bantu tribes grew dominant in the region, largely absorbing and replacing the Bambenga. By the 14th century, the Vili Kingdom of Loango had extended its control northward along the Gabonese coastline.

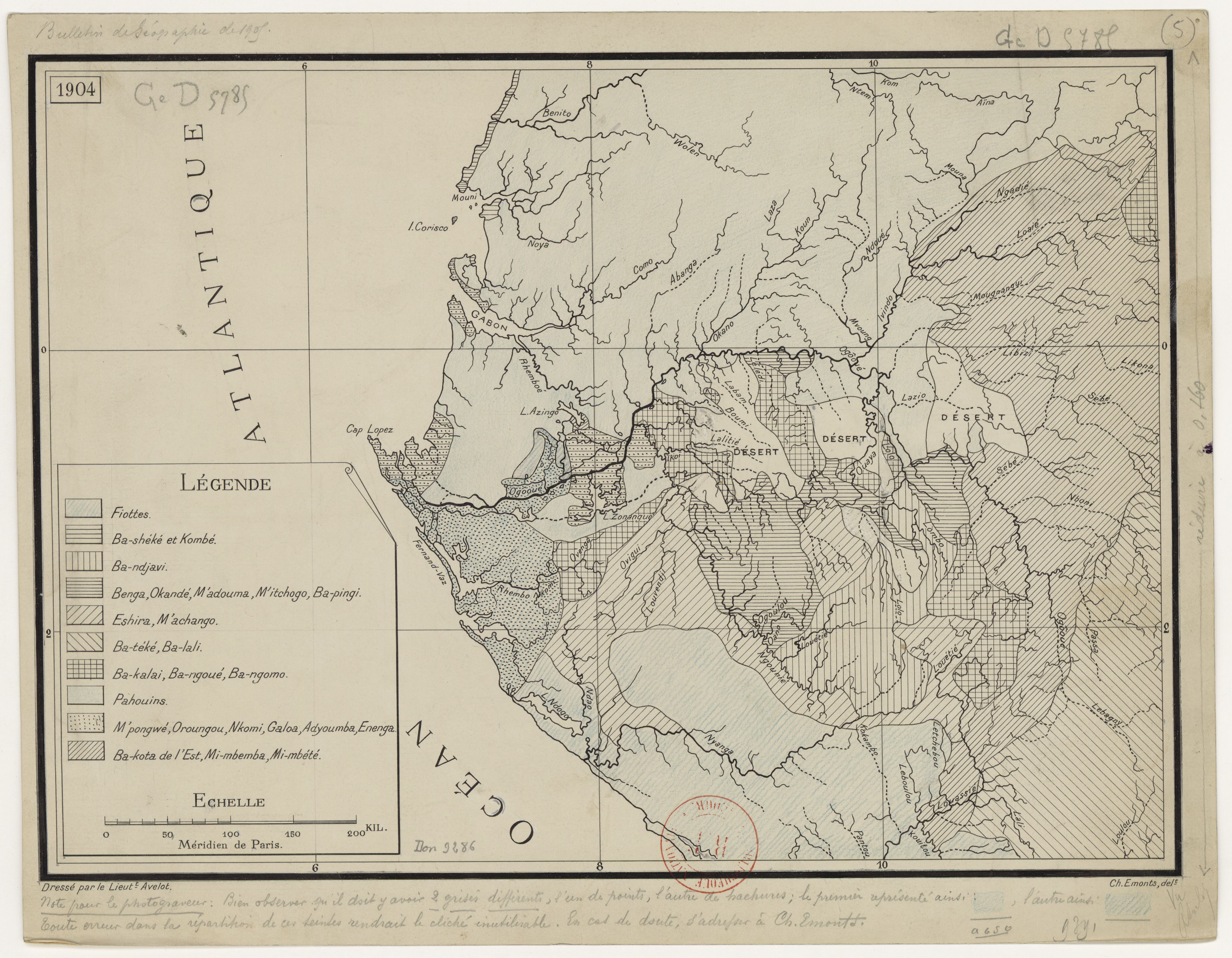
Ethnographic map of Gabon and neighboring areas (1905)

Between the late 16th and 18th centuries, European merchants frequented the coast for the ivory and slave trades mediated by local brokers. Coastal communities exchanged such commodities and captives from the interior for sea salt, cloth, mirrors, cooking vessels, and weapons (including guns and iron machetes). The importation of a large supply of cheap ironware from abroad displaced the livelihoods of native blacksmiths. Mayumba emerged as a key slaving port in southern Gabon. In the 18th century, a Myènè-speaking thalassocracy known as the Kingdom of Orungu formed amid the rise of an elite of wealthy brokers enriched by international commerce. The kingdom was a maritime trading centre on the Cape Lopez Peninsula that profited from goods such as ivory, copal, ebony, beeswax, and dyewood, but increasingly became dependent on the trade in enslaved people. With the demise of the Atlantic slave trade in the 1870s, the kingdom fell under French control.

=== French rule and independence ===
Explorer Pierre Savorgnan de Brazza led his first mission to the Gabon-Congo area in 1875. He founded Franceville and became the colonial governor. Some Bantu groups lived in the area when France officially occupied it in 1885. In 1887, the slave warehouses at Cape Lopez and Mayumba were formally closed by French officers.

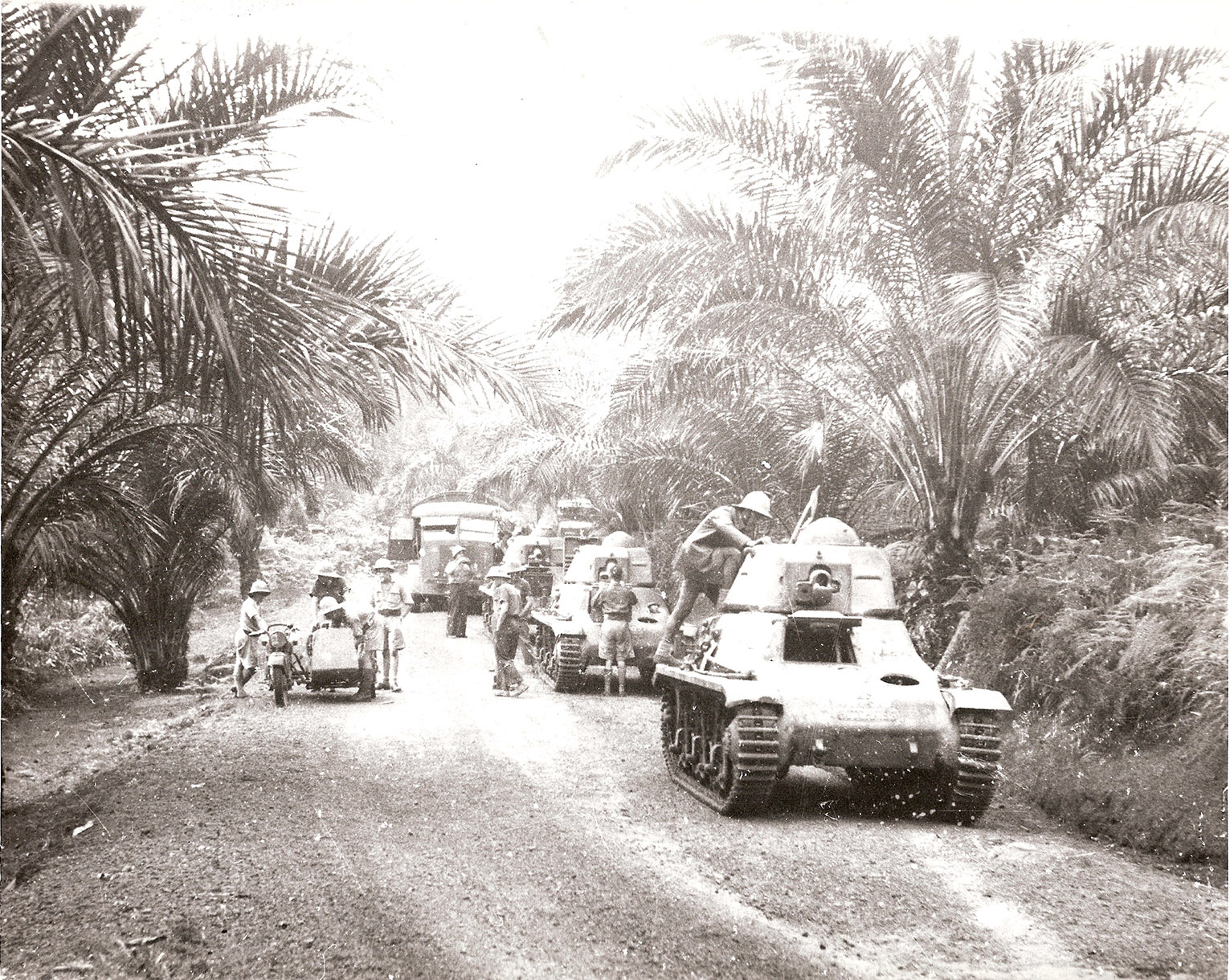
The Battle of Gabon resulted in the Free French Forces taking the colony of Gabon from Vichy French forces, 1940.

In 1910, Gabon became a territory of French Equatorial Africa, a federation that survived until 1958. The colonial regime imposed a two-tier social code, placing the vast majority of the population under the indigénat, which assigned them an inferior legal status, levied heavy taxation, and mandated the corvée (forced labour). Because cash was scarce for most of the colonial era, farmers were forced to pay taxes in ivory, palm oil, and rubber.

During World War II, the state conscripted half of the adult male population for road construction and on plantations managed by the government-sponsored Sociétés Indigènes de Prévoyance. The punishment for refusing the corvée was imprisonment. In 1940, the Allies invaded Gabon to overthrow the pro-Vichy France colonial administration. On 28 November 1958 Gabon became an autonomous republic within the French Community, and on 17 August 1960 it became fully independent.

=== M'ba rule ===
The first president of Gabon, elected in 1961, was Léon M'ba, with Omar Bongo Ondimba as his vice president. After M'ba acceded to power, the press was suppressed, political demonstrations suppressed, freedom of expression curtailed, other political parties gradually excluded from power, and the constitution changed along French lines to vest power in the presidency. When M'ba dissolved the National Assembly in 1964 to institute one-party rule, an army coup sought to oust him from power and restore parliamentary democracy. French paratroopers flew in within 24 hours to restore M'ba to power. After days of fighting, the coup ended, and the opposition was imprisoned, with protests and riots ensuing.

=== Bongo rule ===
When M'ba died in 1967, Bongo replaced him as president. In 1968, Bongo declared Gabon a one-party state by dissolving Gabonese Democratic Bloc that had been established by M'ba and establishing the Parti Démocratique Gabonais (PDG). He invited all Gabonese to participate, regardless of previous political affiliation. Bongo sought to forge a single national movement in support of the government's development policies, using PDG as a tool to suppress the regional and tribal rivalries that had divided Gabonese politics in the past. When Bongo was elected president in 1975, he abolished the position of vice president and replaced it with prime minister, who had no right to automatic succession. Bongo was re-elected president to two 7-year terms in 1979 and 1986.

In 1990, economic discontent and a desire for political liberalization provoked demonstrations and strikes by students and workers. In response to grievances by workers, Bongo negotiated with them on a sector-by-sector basis, making wage concessions. He promised to open up PDG and organize a national political conference to discuss Gabon's future political system. PDG and 74 political organizations attended the conference. Participants were essentially divided into 2 "loose" coalitions: the ruling PDG and its allies, and the United Front of Opposition Associations and Parties, consisting of the breakaway Morena Fundamental and the Gabonese Progress Party.

==== Transitional government ====
The conference approved political reforms, including the creation of a national Senate, decentralization of the budgetary process, freedom of assembly and press, and cancellation of an exit visa requirement. In an attempt to guide the political system's transformation to multiparty democracy, Bongo resigned as PDG chairman and created a transitional government headed by Prime Minister Casimir Oyé-Mba. The Gabonese Social Democratic Grouping (RSDG), as the resulting government was called, was smaller than the previous government and included representatives from some opposition parties in its cabinet. RSDG drafted a provisional constitution that provided a basic bill of rights and an independent judiciary and retained "strong" executive powers for the president. After further review by a constitutional committee and the National Assembly, this document came into force in March 1991.

Opposition to PDG continued after the conference, and in September 1990 two coup d'état attempts were uncovered and aborted. With demonstrations after the death of an opposition leader, the first multiparty National Assembly elections in almost 30 years took place, with PDG garnering a majority. In 1991, the Parliament of Gabon adopted a new constitution, and the country switched to multiparty elections.

==== Re-elections and rule ====
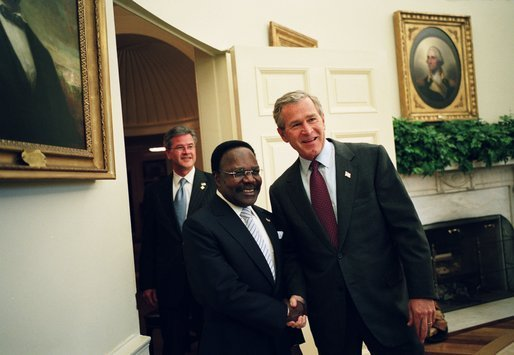
President George W. Bush welcomes President Omar Bongo to the Oval Office, May 2004.

Following Bongo's re-election in 1993 with 51% of the vote, opposition candidates refused to validate the election results. Civil disturbances and violent repression led to an agreement between the government and opposition factions to work toward a political settlement. These talks led to the Paris Accords in November 1994, under which some opposition figures were included in a government of national unity. This arrangement broke down, and the 1996 and 1997 legislative and municipal elections provided the background for renewed partisan politics. PDG won in the legislative election, and some cities, including Libreville, elected opposition mayors during the 1997 local election.

Facing a divided opposition, Bongo coasted to re-election in 1998. While some of Bongo's opponents rejected the outcome as fraudulent, some international observers characterized the results as representative, "despite many perceived irregularities". Legislative elections held in 2001–02 were boycotted by several smaller opposition parties and were criticized for their administrative weaknesses, producing a National Assembly dominated by PDG and allied independents. In 2005 Bongo was elected for his sixth term. Opponents claimed that the balloting process was marred by irregularities. There were some instances of violence following the announcement of his win. In the 2006 National Assembly elections, some seats contested because of voting irregularities were overturned by the Constitutional Court, and the subsequent run-off elections in 2007 yielded a PDG-controlled National Assembly.

==== Death of Bongo and succession ====
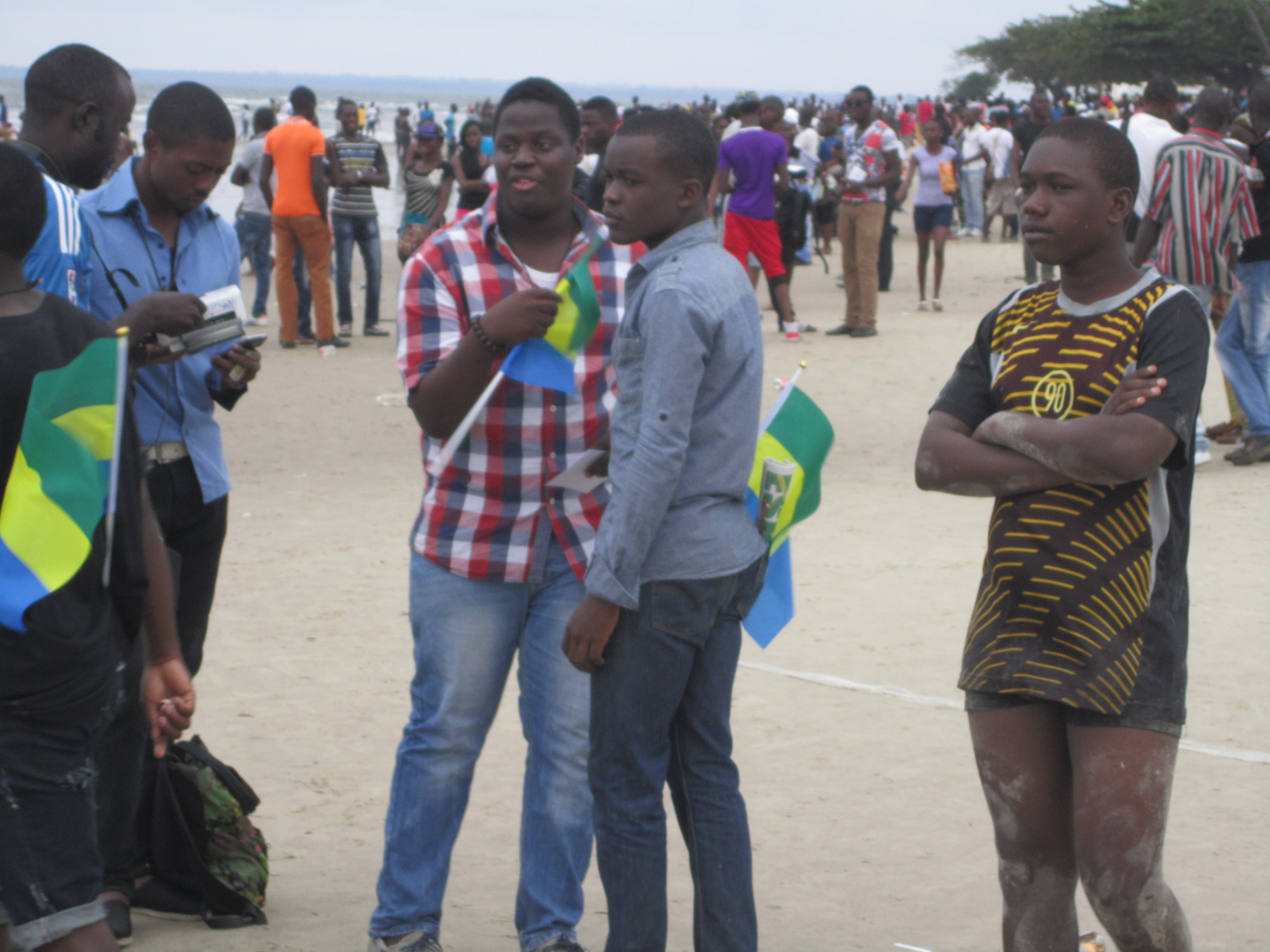
Independence Day celebration in Gabon

Following the death of Bongo on 8 June 2009 due to cardiac arrest, Gabon entered a period of political transition. Per the amended constitution, Rose Francine Rogombé, president of the Senate, assumed the role of interim president. The subsequent 2009 presidential elections marked a historic moment as they were the first in Gabon's history not to feature Bongo as a candidate. With a crowded field of 18 contenders, including Bongo's son and ruling party leader, Ali Bongo, the elections were closely watched both domestically and internationally.

After a rigorous three-week review by the Constitutional Court, Ali Bongo was officially declared the winner. However, the announcement of his victory was met with scepticism by some opposition candidates, sparking sporadic protests across the country. Discontent was more pronounced in Port-Gentil, where allegations of electoral fraud resulted in violent demonstrations. The unrest claimed four lives and led to significant property damage, including attacks on the French Consulate and a local prison. Subsequently, security forces were deployed, and a curfew remained in effect for over three months. In June 2010, a partial legislative by-election was held, marking the emergence of the Union Nationale (UN) coalition, primarily comprising defectors from the ruling PDG party following Omar Bongo's death. The contest for the five available seats saw both the PDG and UN claiming victory, underscoring the political tensions that persisted in the aftermath of the presidential transition.

In January 2019 a group of soldiers launched an unsuccessful coup against Bongo while he was in Morocco recovering from a stroke. In June 2021, Gabon became the first African country to receive payments for reducing deforestation and associated emissions. In June 2022, Gabon joined the Commonwealth of Nations.

=== 2023 coup d'état ===
In August 2023, following the announcement that Ali Bongo had won a third term in the general election, military officers announced that they had taken power in a coup d'état and cancelled the election results. They also dissolved state institutions, including the Judiciary, Parliament and the Constitutional Assembly. On 31 August army officers who seized power, ending the Bongo family's 55-year hold on power, named General Brice Oligui Nguema as transitional leader, and Nguema was sworn in as interim president.

As a consequence of the coup, Gabon was partially suspended from the Commonwealth of Nations. The partial suspension excluded Gabon from the Councils of the Commonwealth, and the organization's meetings and events, such as the Commonwealth Heads of Government Meeting. This was done as a potential preamble to a full suspension from the Commonwealth, if "acceptable progress is not made within two years". Gabon was restored to a position of full membership within the Commonwealth in July 2025, with the organization stating that the Presidential election held on 12 April 2025 "largely reflected the will of the people who voted and that it was conducted in a credible, transparent and inclusive manner". In November 2024, a referendum on a new constitution was approved, reforming the country's government. Nguema won the 2025 presidential election with more than 90% of the vote, becoming the 4th president of Gabon.

== Politics ==
The presidential republic form of government is stated under the 1961 constitution (revised in 1975, rewritten in 1991, and revised in 2003). The president is elected by universal suffrage for a seven-year term; a 2003 constitutional amendment removed presidential term limits. The president can appoint and dismiss the prime minister, the cabinet, and judges of the independent Supreme Court. The president has other powers, such as the authority to dissolve the National Assembly, declare a state of siege, delay legislation, and conduct referendums. The parliament of Gabon is bicameral with a National Assembly and Senate. The National Assembly has 120 deputies who are popularly elected for a five-year term. The Senate is composed of 102 members who are elected by municipal councils and regional assemblies and serve for six years. The president of the Senate is next in succession to the president.

In 1990, the government made changes to Gabon's political system. A transitional constitution was drafted in May 1990 as an outgrowth of the national political conference in March–April and later revised by a constitutional committee. Among its provisions were a Western-style bill of rights, the creation of a National Council of Democracy to oversee the guarantee of those rights, a governmental advisory board on economic and social issues, and an independent judiciary. After approval by the National Assembly, the PDG Central Committee, and the president, the Assembly unanimously adopted the constitution in March 1991. Multiparty legislative elections were held in 1990–1991 when opposition parties had not been declared formally legal. In January 1991, the Assembly passed by unanimous vote a law governing the legalization of opposition parties.

After President Omar Bongo was re-elected in 1993, in a disputed election where only 51% of votes were cast, social and political disturbances led to the 1994 Paris Conference and Accords. These provided a framework for the next elections. Local and legislative elections were delayed until 1996–1997. In 1997, constitutional amendments put forward years earlier were adopted to create the Senate and the position of vice president and to extend the president's term to seven years.

In 2009, President Ali Bongo began efforts to streamline the government. To reduce corruption and government bloat, he eliminated 17 minister-level positions, abolished the vice presidency and reorganized the portfolios of some ministries, bureaus and directorates. Bongo announced a vision for the modernization of Gabon, called "Gabon Emergent". This program contains three pillars: Green Gabon, Service Gabon, and Industrial Gabon. The goals of Gabon Emergent are to diversify the economy so that Gabon becomes less reliant on petroleum, to eliminate corruption, and to modernize the workforce. Under this program, exports of raw timber were banned, a government-wide census was held, the work day was changed to eliminate a long midday break, and a national oil company was created.

On 25 January 2011, André Mba Obame declared himself president. He selected 19 ministers for his government and took refuge in a United Nations office in Libreville. In response, the government dissolved Obame's Gabonese Union for Democracy and Development party. African Union chairman Jean Ping said Obame's action "hurts the integrity of legitimate institutions and also endangers the peace, the security and the stability of Gabon." Interior Minister Jean-François Ndongou accused Obame and his supporters of treason. UN Secretary-General Ban Ki-moon said that he recognized Obame as the only official Gabonese president.

The 2016 presidential election was disputed, with "very close" official results reported between Ping and incumbent Bongo. Protests broke out in the capital and met repression, which culminated in the bombing of the opposition party headquarters, allegedly by the presidential guard. Between 50 and 100 citizens were killed by security forces, and 1,000 were arrested. International observers criticized irregularities, including unnaturally high turnout reported for some districts. The Supreme Court threw out some suspect precincts, and the ballots were destroyed. The election was declared in favour of Bongo. The European Parliament issued two resolutions denouncing the unclear results of the election and calling for an investigation into the human rights violations.

A few days after the controversial 2023 presidential election, a group of military officials declared a military coup and that they had overthrown the government and deposed Bongo. The announcement came hours after Bongo was officially re-elected for a third term. General Brice Oligui Nguema was appointed as the transitional leader. This event marked the eighth instance of military intervention in the region since 2020, raising concerns about democratic stability.

=== Foreign relations ===
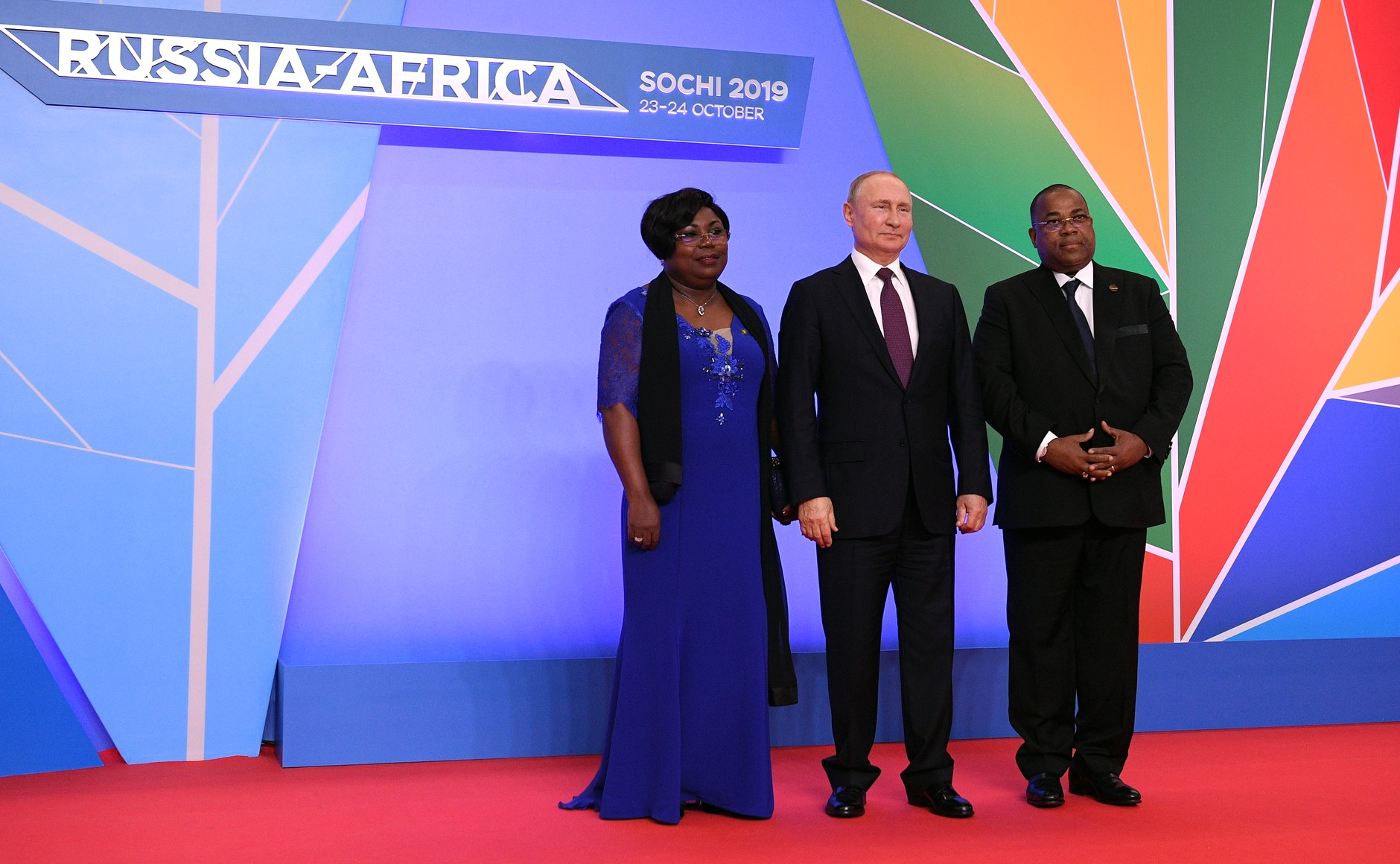
Prime Minister of Gabon Julien Nkoghe Bekale and Russian President Vladimir Putin at the Russia-Africa Summit in Sochi in Russia in October 2019

Since independence, Gabon has followed a nonaligned policy, advocating dialogue in international affairs and recognizing each side of divided countries. In intra-African affairs, it espouses development by evolution rather than revolution and favours regulated private enterprise as the system most likely to promote rapid economic growth. It involved itself in mediation efforts in Chad, the Central African Republic, Angola, the Republic of the Congo, the Democratic Republic of the Congo, and Burundi. In December 1999, through the mediation efforts of President Bongo, a peace accord was signed in the Republic of the Congo (Brazzaville) between the government and most leaders of an armed rebellion. Bongo was involved in the continuing DRC peace process and played a role in mediating a crisis in Ivory Coast.

Gabon is a member of the United Nations and some of its specialized and related agencies, and of the World Bank; the IMF; the African Union (AU); the Central African Customs Union/Central African Economic and Monetary Community (UDEAC/CEMAC); EU/ACP association under the Lomé Convention; the Communauté Financière Africaine (CFA); the Organization of the Islamic Conference (OIC); the Nonaligned Movement; and the Economic Community of Central African States (ECCAS/CEEAC). In 1995, Gabon withdrew from the Organization of the Petroleum Exporting Countries (OPEC), rejoining in 2016. In 2022, Gabon joined the Commonwealth of Nations. In 2024 Nguema assured American and French leaders that Gabon would be an ally of the West moving forward, as a part of his broader plan to solve the ongoing debt crisis. In 2023, Gabon was suspended from the African Union following the coup d'état and was re-instated following Nguema's election.

=== Military ===
The Armed Forces of Gabon has a professional military of about 5,000 personnel, divided into army, navy, air force, gendarmerie, and police force. A 1,800-member guard provides security for the president.

=== Administrative divisions ===

Gabon is divided into 9 provinces, which are subdivided into 50 departments. The president appoints the provincial governors, the prefects, and the subprefects.

The provinces are (capitals in parentheses):

1. Estuaire (Libreville)
2. Haut-Ogooué (Franceville)
3. Moyen-Ogooué (Lambaréné)
4. Ngounié (Mouila)
5. Nyanga (Tchibanga)
6. Ogooué-Ivindo (Makokou)
7. Ogooué-Lolo (Koulamoutou)
8. Ogooué-Maritime (Port-Gentil)
9. Woleu-Ntem (Oyem)

== Geography ==
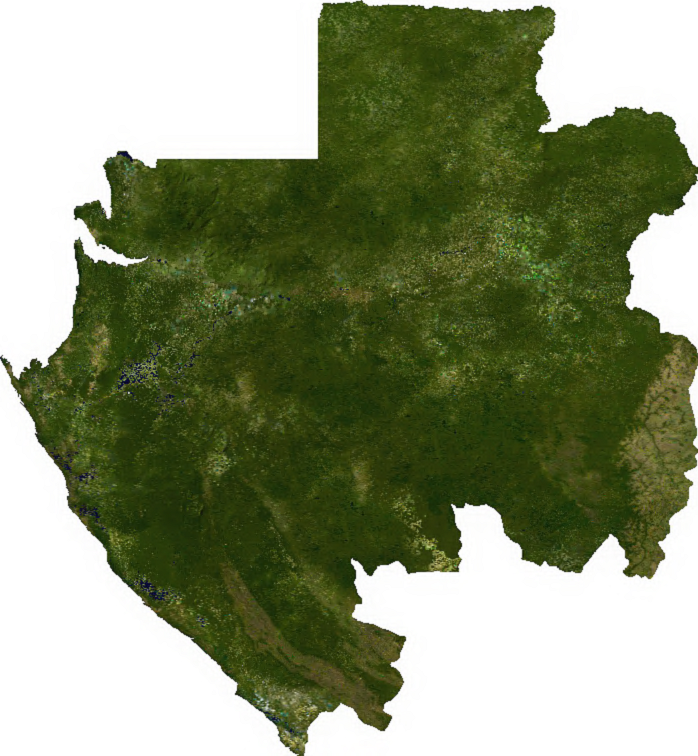
Satellite image of Gabon

Map of Köppen climate classification

Gabon is located on the Atlantic coast of Central Africa on the equator, between latitudes 3°N and 4°S, and longitudes 8° and 15°E. Gabon has an equatorial climate with a system of rainforests, with 89.3% of its land area forested.

There are coastal plains (ranging between 20 and 300 km [10 and 190 mi] from the ocean's shore), the mountains (the Crystal Mountains to the northeast of Libreville, the Chaillu Massif in the centre), and the savanna in the east. The coastal plains form a section of the World Wildlife Fund's Atlantic Equatorial coastal forests ecoregion and contain patches of Central African mangroves including on the Muni River estuary on the border with Equatorial Guinea.

Geologically, Gabon is primarily Archaean and Palaeoproterozoic igneous and metamorphic basement rock, belonging to the stable continental crust of the Congo Craton. Some formations are more than 2 billion years old. Some rock units are overlain by marine carbonate, lacustrine and continental sedimentary rocks, and unconsolidated sediments and soils that formed in the last 2.5 million years of the Quaternary. The rifting apart of Pangaea created rift basins that filled with sediments and formed the hydrocarbons. There are Oklo reactor zones, a natural nuclear fission reactor which was active 2 billion years ago. The site was discovered during uranium mining in the 1970s to supply the French nuclear power industry.

Its largest river is the Ogooué, which is 1,200 kilometres (750 mi) long. It has three karst areas where there are hundreds of caves located in the dolomite and limestone rocks. A National Geographic expedition visited some caves in the summer of 2008 to document them.

Gabon is highly vulnerable to climate change due to its dense coastal population, economic hubs along the shore, and dependence on rainfed agriculture. Rising sea levels threaten to erode the coastline and contaminate freshwater sources with saltwater. The country is experiencing more frequent and severe extreme weather events, such as floods, droughts, and storms, which damage infrastructure, displace communities, and disrupt food security and livelihoods. To adapt, Gabon prioritises protecting its coastal areas, as well as its fishing, agriculture, and forestry industries. Its vast forests act as a net carbon sink. It is recognized as a global leader in climate action and is widely considered the most carbon-positive country in the world, due to its strong conservation efforts.

In 2002 roughly 10% of the nation's territory was designated national park land, with 13 parks in total. The National Agency for National Parks manages the park system. Gabon had a 2018 Forest Landscape Integrity Index mean score of 9.07/10, ranking it 9th globally out of 172 countries.

=== Wildlife ===
African forest elephant in Gabon

Gabon has a large number of protected animal and plant species. The country's biodiversity is one of the most varied on the planet. Gabon is home of 604 species of birds, 98 species of amphibians, between 95 and 160 species of reptiles, and 198 different species of mammals. Rare species include the giant pangolin and the grey-necked rockfowl. The country is one of the most varied and important fauna reserves in Africa: it is an important refuge for chimpanzees (whose number, in 2003, was estimated between 27,000 and 64,000) and gorillas (28,000-42,000 estimated in 1983). The "Gorilla and Chimpanzee Study Station" inside the Lopé National Park is dedicated to their study. The nation is home to more than half the population of African forest elephants, many of them living in Minkébé National Park. From 2004 to 2014, the population in the park declined by 78-81%, a loss of more than 25,000 elephants, primarily due to poaching. Gabon's national symbol is the black panther.

More than 6,000 species of plants and 400 species of trees form the flora of Gabon. Gabon is densely forested, with more than 85% of the country covered by forest, much of it largely undisturbed. The deforestation rate in Gabon is low, although some forests face localized pressures due to urbanization.

== Economy ==
Change in per capita GDP of Gabon, 1950–2018. Figures are inflation-adjusted to 2011 International dollars.

Gabon's economy is heavily dependent on oil and other natural resources, leaving it exposed to global market shifts and climate-related risks. Oil revenue constitutes roughly 46% of the government's budget, 43% of the gross domestic product (GDP), and 81% of exports. The rich Grondin Oil Field was discovered in 1971 in 50 m (160 ft) water depths 40 km (25 mi) offshore in an anticline salt structural trap in Batanga sandstones of Maastrichtian age, but about 60% of its estimated reserves had been extracted by 1978. As of 2023, Gabon produces about 200,000 barrels per day of crude oil.

"Overspending" on the Trans-Gabon Railway, the CFA franc devaluation of 1994, and periods of lower oil prices caused debt problems. At the insistence of the World Bank and International Monetary Fund (IMF), the government embarked in the 1990s on a program of privatization of its state-owned companies and administrative reform, including reducing public sector employment and salary growth. The government has voiced a commitment to work toward an economic transformation of the country. Successive IMF missions have criticized the Gabonese government for overspending on off-budget items (in good years and bad), over-borrowing from the central bank, and slipping on the schedule for privatization and administrative reform. In 2005, Gabon successfully concluded a 15-month Stand-By Arrangement with the IMF. A three-year Stand-By Arrangement with the IMF was approved in 2007. Due to the 2008 financial crisis and social developments surrounding the death of President Omar Bongo and the elections, Gabon was unable to meet its economic goals under the Stand-By Arrangement in 2009.

Gabon's oil revenues have given it a per capita GDP of $8,600. A "skewed income distribution" and "poor social indicators" are "evident". The richest 20% of the population earn over 90% of the income while about a third of the population lives in poverty.

The economy is dependent on extraction. Before the discovery of oil, logging was the pillar of the economy. Then, logging and manganese mining are the "next-most-important" income generators. Some explorations suggest the presence of the world's largest unexploited iron ore deposit. For some who live in rural areas without access to employment opportunities in extractive industries, remittances from family members in urban areas or subsistence activities provide income.

Foreign and local observers have lamented the lack of diversity in the economy. Factors that have limited the development of new industries include:

- The market is "small", about a million
- dependent on imports from France
- unable to capitalize on regional markets
- Entrepreneurial zeal is not always present among the Gabonese
- a "fairly regular" stream of oil "rent", even if it is diminishing

Further investment in the agricultural or tourism sectors is "complicated by poor infrastructure". Some processing and service sectors are "largely dominated by a few prominent local investors".

=== Energy ===
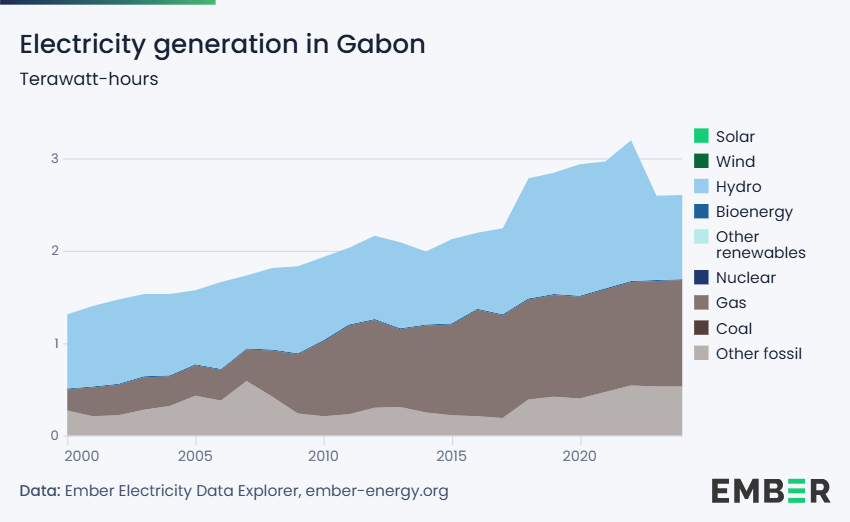
Electricity generation in Gabon in terawatt-hours

Gabon's energy comes from two main sources: solid biofuels and waste (accounting for 75%), and fossil fuels, particularly oil. Nearly half of power generation comes from renewables. Nearly two-thirds of the population has access to electricity. However, rural electrification remains limited - only 15% of rural areas had electricity as of 2014. The country aims to provide universal access to electricity by 2035. Most of the rural population is dependent on biomass fuels for cooking and heating, such as wood and charcoal.

In 2023, the country accounted for just over 0.04% of global greenhouse gas emissions (24.7 million tonnes). Gabon has pledged to stay carbon neutral beyond 2050 and, with adequate support, aims to maintain net carbon removals of 100 million tons CO_{2} equivalent per year beyond that date. It also seeks to expand its renewable energy sector.

=== Manganese ===
Gabon is currently the world's second-largest producer of manganese, an ore vital for steel and battery production. Manganese ore exports are one of the top sources of revenue, and in 2023 they accounted for 16% of exports. Despite the large production of ore, Gabon currently lacks any domestic manganese processing capabilities; as such, the government announced in June 2025 that Gabon would ban domestic exports of manganese ore.

By stopping raw exports, the government seeks to encourage the construction of domestic processing, which would generate skilled employment, boost tax revenues, and capture greater value from its natural resources. The ban on exports will come into effect on 1 January 2029, giving the mining industry three years to construct manganese processing plants domestically. A public-private partnership is being established by the government to help prepare for the transition.

== Demographics ==
Population in Gabon
Year	Million
1950	0.5
2000	1.2
2021	2.3

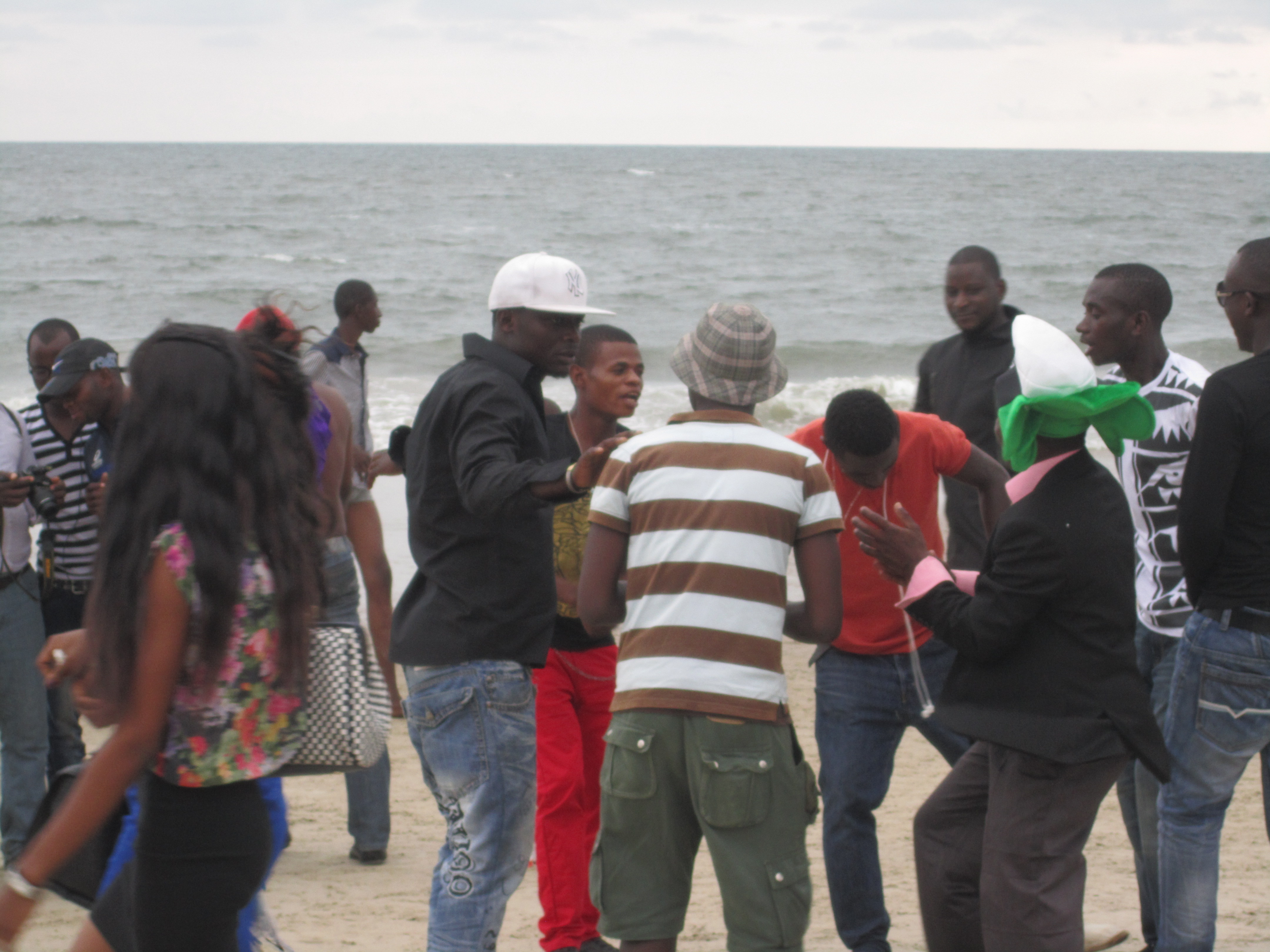
Crowd on beach

Gabon has a population of approximately 2.3 million. Historical and environmental factors caused its population to decline between 1900 and 1940. It has one of the lowest population densities of any country in Africa and the fourth highest Human Development Index in Sub-Saharan Africa.

=== Ethnic groups ===
Gabon has at least 40 ethnic groups, primarily consisting of Bantu peoples. According to the 2021 government demographic and health survey, Fang represent 23.5% of the total population, followed by several groups including the Shira-Punu/Vili (20.6%), Nzebi-Duma (11.2%), Teke-Mbede (5.6%), Myènè (4.4%), Kota-Kélé (4.3%), and Okandé-Tsogho (1.6%). Approximately 12.6% of residents belong to other Gabonese ethnic groups. This figure includes indigenous forest peoples (Bambenga): the Bongo of Ngounié, Baka of Woleu-Ntem, and Bakoya around Mékambo. An additional 16.2% of the total population or 416,651 are noncitizens, mainly foreign workers in the agriculture, construction, and domestic sectors. Most expatriates are male (64%) and hail from Francophone African countries such as Equatorial Guinea, Mali, Benin, Togo, Cameroon, and Senegal. There are also Anglophone enclaves consisting of Ghanaian and Nigerian immigrants. During the late 19th and early 20th century, Hausa-speaking traders of heterogenous backgrounds migrated to colonial Gabon. In 2023, the Hausa community numbered an estimated 16,000. As of 2016, non-Africans living in Gabon include more than 14,000 French citizens, of whom an estimated 2,000 are dual nationals.

Nearly all the ethnic groups are represented in Libreville. Ethnic discrimination is relatively uncommon, as Gabon's multicultural society lacks a single dominant group capable of establishing socio-political hegemony over the others. Some ethnicities are spread throughout Gabon, leading to contact, interaction among the groups, and intermarriage.

=== Population centres ===
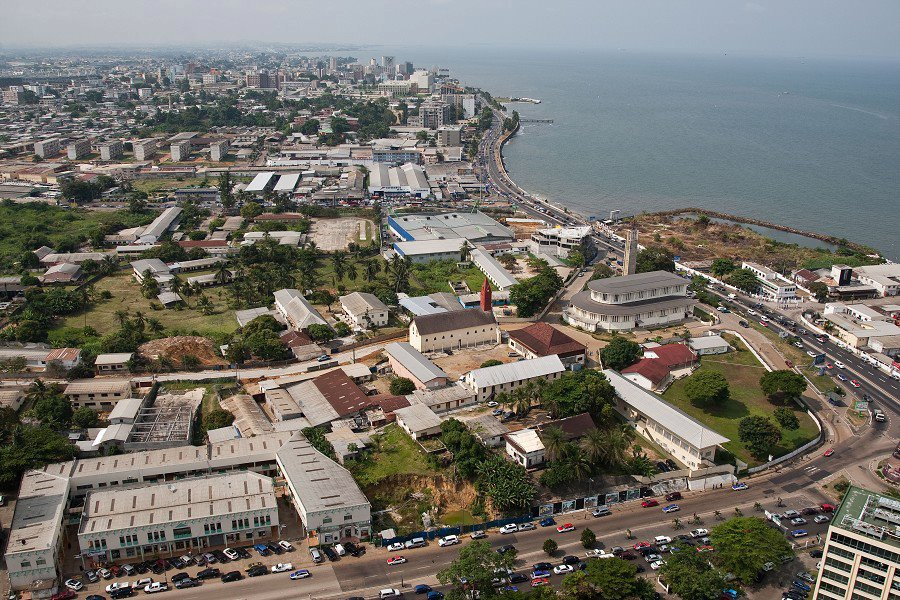
Libreville

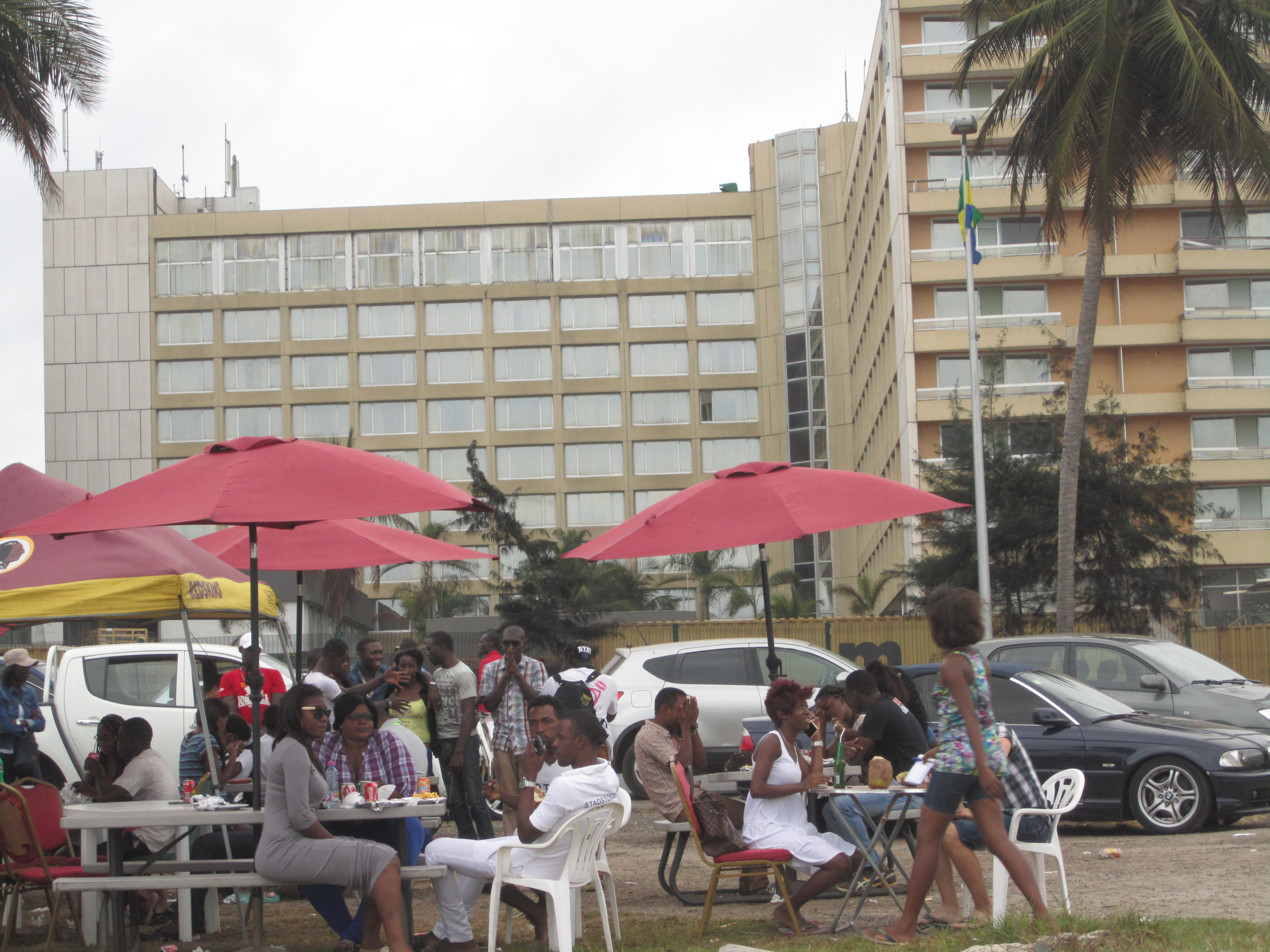
People in Libreville

With an urbanisation rate of 92% in 2025, Gabon ranks as the most urbanised country in Africa. Urbanisation is mostly driven by the superior infrastructure and services available in cities. In Libreville, for example, over 97% of residents have access to clean drinking water, compared to fewer than 55% of those in rural areas. In addition, the search for employment often motivates the migration of rural Gabonese to urban and peri-urban centres. Nearly 59% of the total population live Libreville and Port-Gentil alone.

In precolonial Gabon, there were no major urban centres largely because of the country's dense vegetation and forestation, though there were villages and cosmopolitan maritime ports. The French colonial administration's appropriation of land for trading posts and administrative centres triggered the first waves of rural-to-urban migration in the late 19th century. As rural populations moved to meet urban labour demands, a network of small coastal and riverside towns began to develop. However, the settlement pattern remained predominantly rural upon independence in 1960, with an urbanisation rate under 20%.

The growth of the oil industry in the 1970s created job opportunities in urban communes like Port-Gentil and Gamba, contributing to a mass rural exodus and industrialisation. With the economic boom between 1973 and 1985, the government heavily invested oil revenues to fund urban planning and growth. The 1977 OAU summit and 1985 UDEAC Cup in Libreville led to the rapid development of urban infrastructure in the capital, including public facilities and commercial zones. By 1988, two-thirds of Gabonese residents lived in urban areas, with this share increasing annually.

Cities of Gabon
Rank	City	Population		Province
Rank	City	2003 census	2013 census	Province
1.	Libreville	538,195	703,940	Estuaire
2.	Port-Gentil	105,712	136,462	Ogooué-Maritime
3.	Franceville	103,840	110,568	Haut-Ogooué
4.	Owendo	51,661	79,300	Estuaire
5.	Oyem	35,241	60,685	Woleu-Ntem
6.	Moanda	42,703	59,154	Haut-Ogooué
7.	Ntoum	12,711	51,954	Estuaire
8.	Lambaréné	24,883	38,775	Moyen-Ogooué
9.	Mouila	21,074	36,061	Ngounié
10.	Akanda	–	34,548	Estuaire

=== Languages ===
French is the official language, having been first introduced to the country in the first half of the 19th century by French colonialists and Catholic missionaries. As of 2022, the OIF estimates that around 65% of the population or 1.5 million can speak French, up from 47% in 1960 at the time of independence. A 2024 Afrobarometer survey found 84% spoke French as their primary home language. Consequently, Gabon has the highest share of French-speakers in Africa. French is the most common language in Libreville, Port Gentil, and Franceville–the three largest metropolitan areas. French is the dominant language of business, administration, education, and media.

Many of the indigenous languages have become endangered, owing to the growing use of French as a lingua franca in multiethnic towns. Villages are the only environments where local languages remain widespread, and French usage is limited to formal schooling. According to Ethnologue, Gabon is home to 40 extant indigenous languages; all belong to the Bantu branch of the Niger–Congo language family except for Baka, which is an Ubangian language spoken by an estimated 3,000 Baka people. Around 24 of these languages have been classified as endangered. Nationally, a majority speak indigenous languages according to their ethnic group; this proportion is lower than in most other Sub-Saharan African countries. The 2013 census found that 63.7% could speak a Gabonese language, broken down by 86.3% in rural areas and 60.5% in urban areas, speaking at least one national language.

Of the local languages, Fang is the most spoken with around 350,000 speakers. It is primarily concentrated north of the Ogooué River, particularly in the provinces of Woleu-Ntem and Estuaire. Fang is also the vehicular language in neighboring Equatorial Guinea. Punu is mainly spoken in the Ngounié, Nyanga, and Moyen-Ogooué provinces. Njebi is spoken by a large number in Ngounié, Ogooué-Lolo, and Haut-Ogooué. Other languages with over 10,000 speakers include Latege, Myene, Mbere, Shira, Sangu, Kota, Lumbu, Wumbvu, and Wanzi.

=== Religion ===
Religion in Gabon by the Association of Religion Data Archives (2025)
1. Roman Catholic (42.0%)
2. Other Christian (43.3%)
3. Animism (3.25%)
4. Muslim (10.2%)
5. Other (0.64%)
6. None (1.36%)

Religion in Gabon includes Christianity (Roman Catholicism and Protestantism), Islam, and traditional indigenous religious beliefs. Some people practise elements of both Christianity and indigenous religious beliefs. Approximately 85% practise one of the denominations of Christianity; 10% practise Islam (mainly Sunni).

=== Health ===
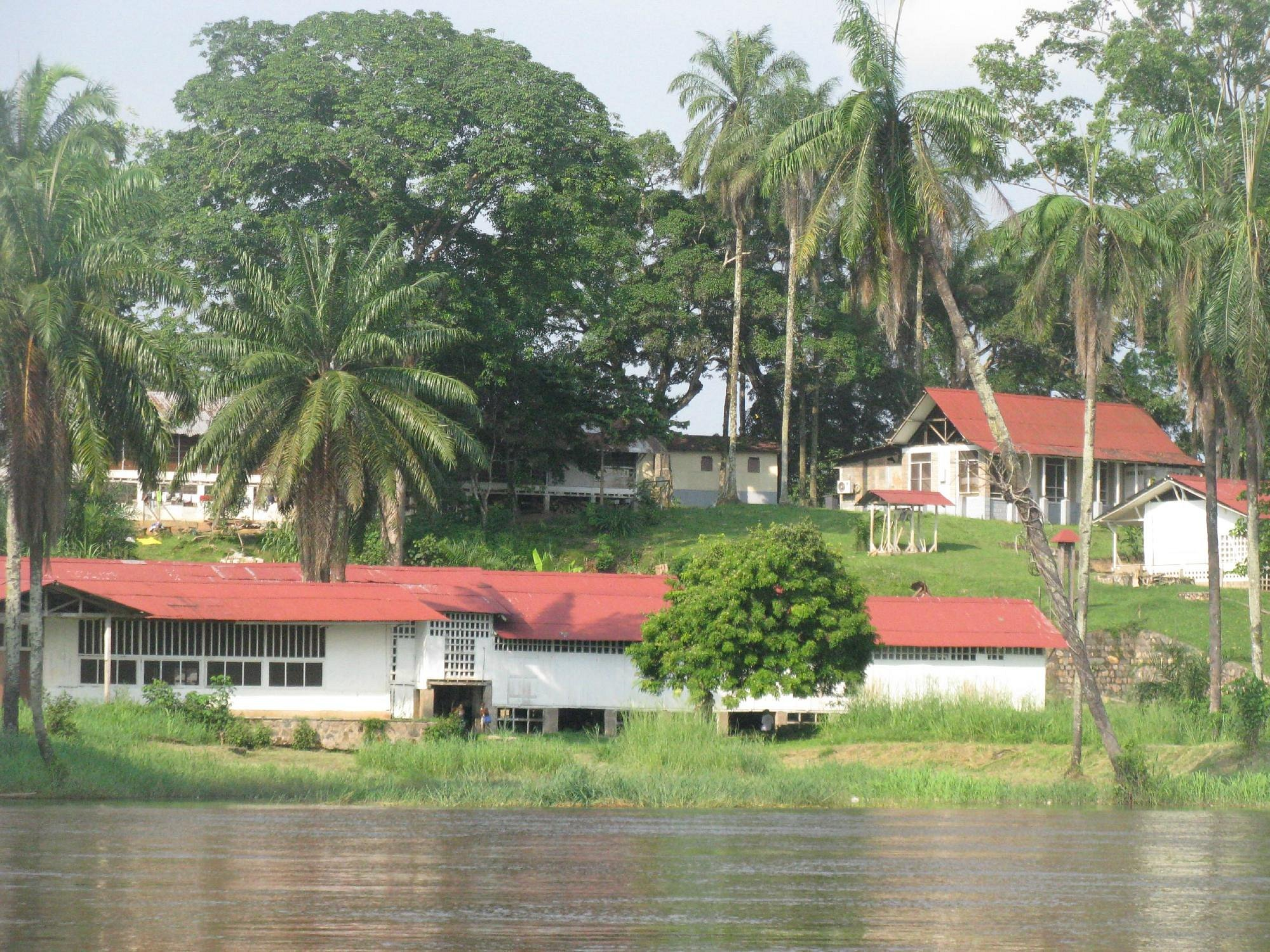
Albert Schweitzer Hospital

A private hospital, Hôpital Albert Schweitzer, was established in 1913 in Lambaréné by Albert Schweitzer. By 1985, there were 28 hospitals, 87 medical centres, and 312 infirmaries and dispensaries. As of 2004, there were an estimated 29 physicians per 100,000 people, and "approximately 90% of the population had access to health care services".

In 2024, 88.6% of the population had access to "at least basic drinking water resources," the highest rate in Central Africa. Although 90% of the urban population has access to basic water services as of 2026, only 49% of rural residents reportedly have access to water, and 51% consume unsafe water. Widespread contamination of freshwater sources, attributed to the lack of sanitation and fecal sludge treatment plants, has increased the risk of waterborne diseases. In July 2026, the government declared a nationwide "state of water emergency" due to low rainfall and aging water facilities, which has also affected the water supply in Libreville.

A government health program treats such diseases as leprosy, sleeping sickness, malaria, filariasis, intestinal worms, and tuberculosis. As of 2025, rates for immunization of children under the age of 1 were 66% for tuberculosis (down from 80% in 2015) and 61% for the first dose of the polio vaccine (down from 75% in 2017). According to official data in 2025, immunization rates for the third dose of the DPT and first dose of the measles vaccines were 62% and 56%, respectively. Gabon has a domestic supply of pharmaceuticals from the factory La Santé Pharmaceutique, a subsidiary of an Indian drug manufacturer, in Nkok.

The total fertility rate (TFR) has decreased from a historic peak of 5.76 births per woman in 1983 to 3.59 in 2024; the country has the lowest TFR in Central Africa. As of 2020, an estimated 14.65% of all births were "low birth weight," as defined by the World Health Organisation. In 2023, the maternal mortality rate was recorded at 233 per 100,000 live births, down from 373 in 1985. In 2024, the infant mortality rate declined to 25.9 per 1,000 live births, which is the second lowest rate in Central Africa. With a life expectancy at birth of 68.5 years in 2024, Gabon holds the second-highest rate in Central Africa. As of 2024, the overall mortality rate was estimated at 6.23 per 1,000 inhabitants, down from a national high of 428.31 in 1960.

The HIV/AIDS prevalence is estimated to be 5.2% of the adult population (ages 15–49). As of 2009, approximately 46,000 people were living with HIV/AIDS. There were an estimated 2,400 deaths from AIDS in 2009 – down from 3,000 deaths in 2003. In the 2024 Global Hunger Index, Gabon ranks 78th out of 127 countries, with a score of 17.4, which indicates a moderate level of hunger.

=== Education ===
Education in Gabon is regulated by two ministries: the Ministry of Education, in charge of pre-kindergarten through the last high school grade, and the Ministry of Higher Education and Innovative Technologies, in charge of universities, higher education, and professional schools.

Education is compulsory for children ages 6 to 16. Some children start their school lives by attending nurseries or "Crèche", then kindergarten, known as "Jardins d'enfants". At age 6, they are enrolled in primary school, "École Primaire", which is made up of 6 grades. The next level is "École Secondaire", which is made up of 7 grades. The planned graduation age is 19 years. Those who graduate can apply for admission to institutions of higher learning, including engineering schools or business schools. As of 2012, the literacy rate of a population ages 15 and above was 82%.

The government has used oil revenue for school construction, paying teachers' salaries, and promoting education, including in rural areas. Maintenance of school structures and teachers' salaries has been declining. In 2002, the gross primary enrollment rate was 132%, and in 2000, the net primary enrollment rate was 78%. Gross and net enrollment ratios are based on the number of students formally registered in primary school. As of 2001, 69% of children who started primary school were "likely" to reach grade 5. Problems in the education system include "poor management and planning, lack of oversight, poorly qualified teachers", and "overcrowded classrooms". Various universities are being chartered, licensed, or accredited by the appropriate higher education-related organization.

== Culture ==
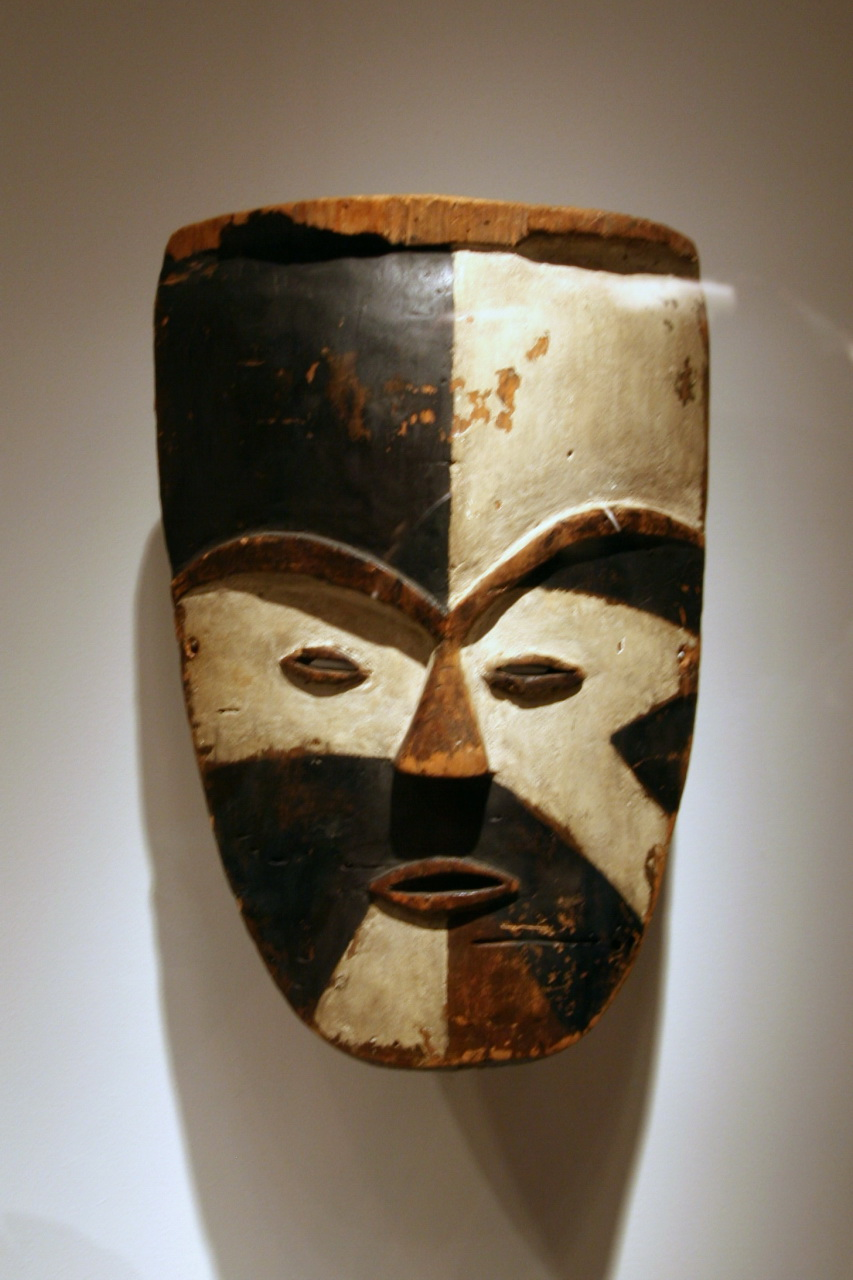
A Gabonese mask

Some traditionalists in Gabon, known as "raconteurs", work to continue practices like the mvett among the Fangs and the Ingwala among the Nzebis. Masks, like the n'goltang masks of the Fang people and the reliquary figures of the Kota, are a central part of Gabonese culture. These masks are used in ceremonies marking significant life events such as marriage, birth, and funerals. They are crafted using local, often rare materials including wood.

=== Music ===
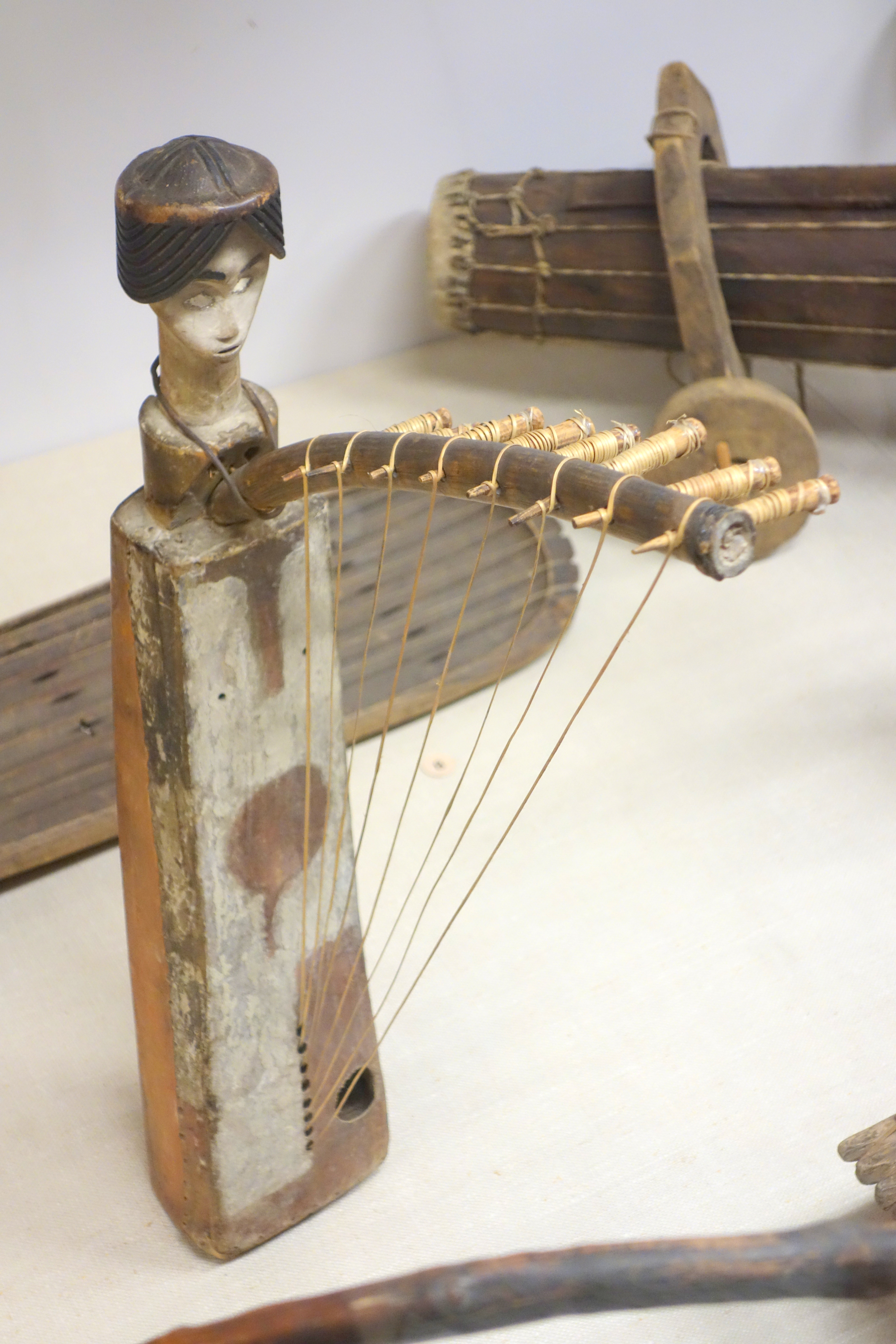
Ngombi of Fang people, type 3.

Music in Gabon reflects the ethnolinguistic diversity and combines traditional, ritual, popular and urban forms. Musical life has historically been closely linked to storytelling, dance, healing, initiation societies and oral literature. Among the best-known traditional forms is the Fang mvet, which refers both to a stringed harp-zither and to an epic genre of sung and spoken narration performed with the instrument. Ritual music associated with bwiti and bwete religious traditions has also played a major cultural role, especially through chant, responsorial singing and harp performance.

Traditional instruments include the ngombi harp, balafon, drums, rattles, horns and a variety of stringed instruments. Regional musical styles are associated with communities such as the Fang, Myènè, Teke, Punu, Kota, Mitsogo and Babongo peoples. Scholars have emphasized that Gabon does not have a single national folk style but rather many localized repertoires shaped by language, ceremony and geography.

From the late colonial period onward, musicians absorbed outside influences including church music, French-language chanson, rumba, makossa, soukous, zouk, rock and later hip hop. In the post-independence era, music became an important part of national cultural identity. Internationally known artists include Pierre Akendengué, noted for poetic and pan-African songwriting, and Oliver N'Goma, whose 1990 album Bane became a major Afro-zouk success. Since the late 1980s, hip hop has become an important urban genre, particularly in Libreville.

=== Media ===
Radio-Diffusion Télévision Gabonaise is the state-owned broadcaster. Its output is primarily in French, and the group airs regular news bulletins in indigenous languages. In 2004, the government operated 2 radio stations, and another 7 were privately owned. There were 2 government television stations and 4 privately owned. In 2003, there were an estimated 488 radios and 308 television sets for every 1,000 people. About 11.5 of every 1,000 people were cable subscribers. In 2003, there were 22.4 personal computers for every 1,000 people, and 26 of every 1,000 people had access to the Internet. The national press service is the Gabonese Press Agency, which publishes a daily paper, Gabon-Matin (circulation 18,000 as of 2002).

L'Union in Libreville, the government-controlled daily newspaper, had an average daily circulation of 40,000 in 2002. The weekly Gabon d'Aujourd'hui is published by the Ministry of Communications. There are about 9 privately owned periodicals that are either independent or affiliated with political parties. These are published in certain numbers that have been delayed by financial constraints. The constitution of Gabon provides for free speech and a free press, and the government supports these rights. Some periodicals actively criticize the government, and foreign publications are available.

=== Cuisine ===
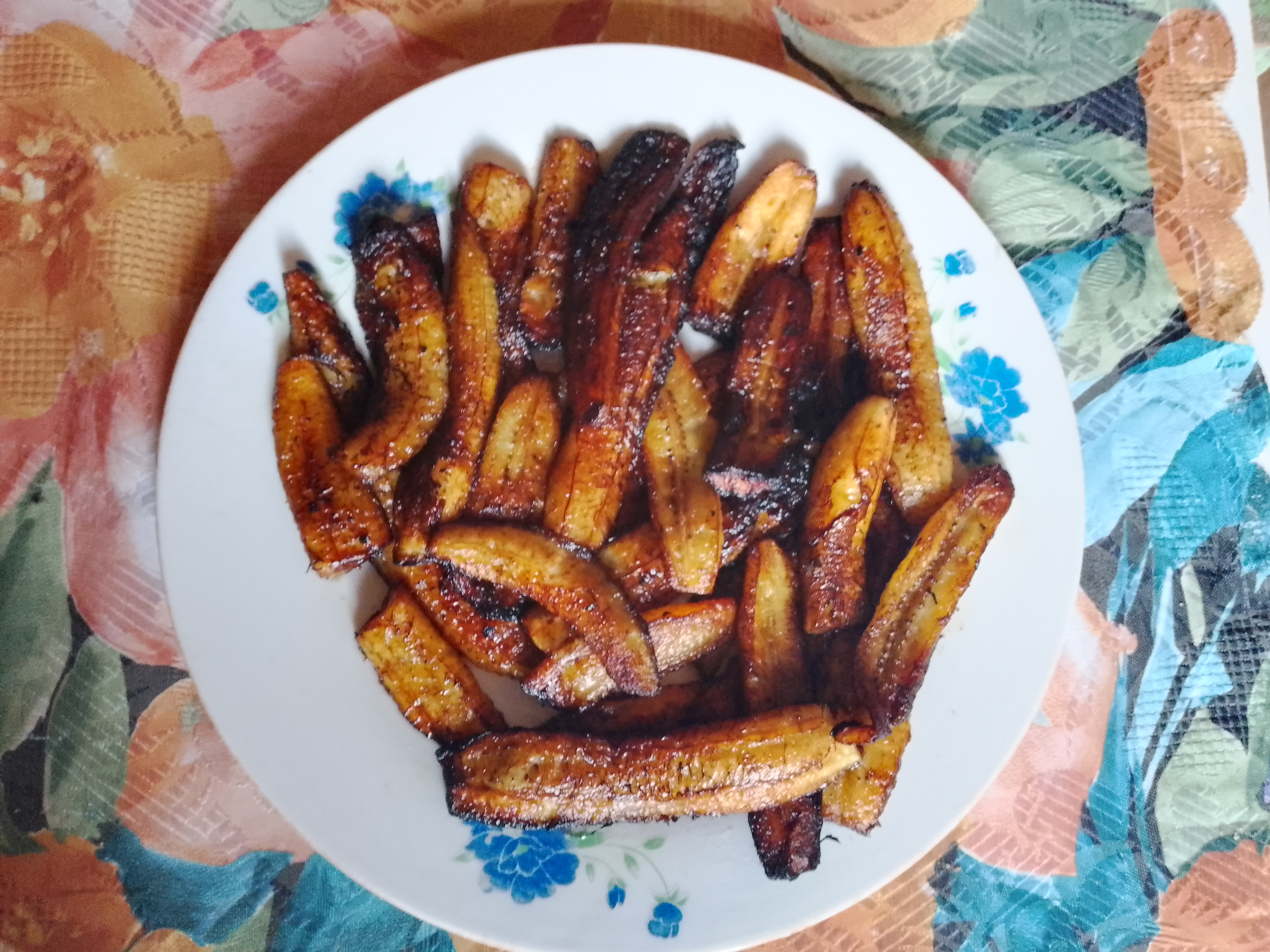
Bananes frites (fried plantains)

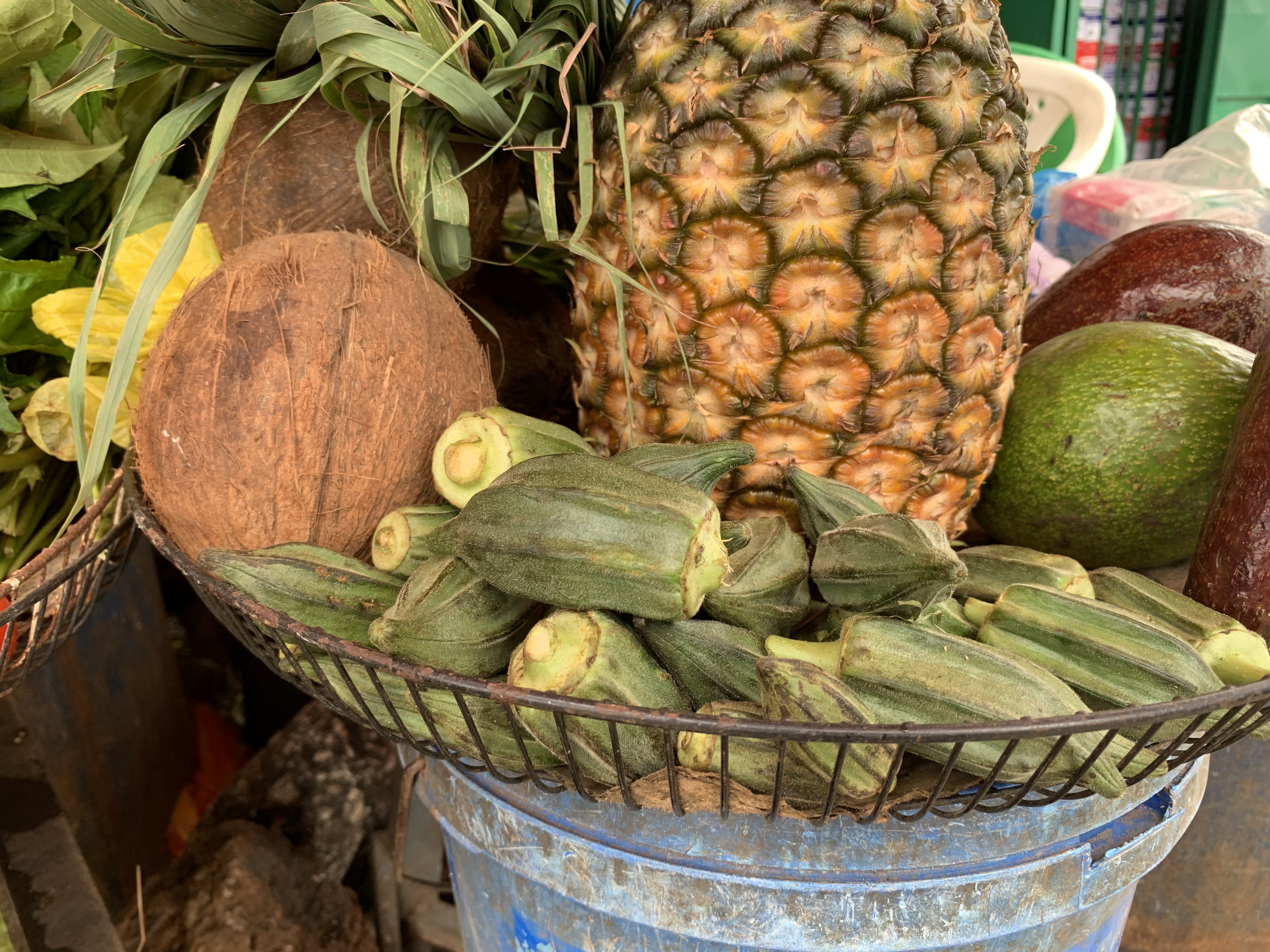
Agricultural products in Gabon

Gabonese cuisine is influenced by indigenous Central African and French cuisine. Traditional staples include cassava, rice, beans, taro, yam, plantain, fish, shellfish, and poultry. Seafood is particularly prevalent in coastal cities, including Libreville. Grilled tilapia, barracuda, and captain fish are common courses, usually served with fried plantains and spicy pepper sauces. Brochettes or skewers of grilled beef, chicken, or goat meat and vegetables paired with hot chili sauce are popular street foods. Poulet Nyembwe, spiced chicken cooked and flavoured in palm nut sauce, is considered the national dish. The palm nut sauce used in the dish is known as nyembwe, which means palm oil in the Myènè language.

Tropical fruits like mangoes, pineapples, bananas, guavas, papayas, and coconuts are widely consumed. The atanga (African plum) is often boiled and spread on bread as a street snack. Another fruit native to Gabon is the mvout, a dark red round fruit with a sour centre. Odika sauce, sometimes referred to as chocolat because of its colour, is made from cooked ground wild mango seeds and often combined with meat or fish to create aromatic stews. Foufou is a common cassava-based meal, typically served with berbere (a chili spice mixture) as a side dish to stews. Other vegetables consumed in Gabon include okra, spinach, eggplants, tomatoes, nkumu, and zucchini.

Beignets and croquettes represent French influence on the local cuisine. Omelettes and baguettes are also common foods of French origin. Coupé-coupé (lit. 'cut-cut' in French) is a popular street food consisting of smoked meat served on a baguette.

=== Sports ===
The Gabon national football team has represented the nation since 1962. The Under-23 football team won the 2011 CAF U-23 Championship and qualified for the 2012 London Olympics. Gabon were joint hosts, along with Equatorial Guinea, of the 2012 Africa Cup of Nations, and the sole hosts of the competition's 2017 tournament. The Gabon national basketball team, nicknamed Les Panthères, finished 8th at the AfroBasket 2015. Gabon has competed at most Summer Olympics since 1972. Anthony Obame won a silver medal in taekwondo at the 2012 Olympics held in London. Gabon has recreational fishing and is considered the "best place in the world" to catch Atlantic tarpon. Since 2006, Gabon has hosted La Tropicale Amissa Bongo, a professional week-long bicycle race which includes both European and African teams.

== See also ==
- Outline of Gabon
- List of Gabonese people
- Transport in Gabon
- Lambaréné
- Hôpital Albert Schweitzer

== Bibliography ==
- Bachmann, Olaf. "Gabon: An Uneasy Civil‒Military Concord." Oxford Research Encyclopedia of Politics (2020).
- Gardinier, David E. "France and Gabon since 1993: The reshaping of a neo-colonial relationship." Journal of Contemporary African Studies 18.2 (2000): 225–242. online
- Ghazvinian, John (2008). Untapped: The Scramble for Africa's Oil. Orlando: Harcourt. ISBN 978-0-15-101138-4.
- Gray, Christopher J. "Cultivating citizenship through xenophobia in Gabon, 1960-1995." Africa today 45.3/4 (1998): 389-409 online
- Gray, Christopher. "Who Does Historical Research in Gabon? Obstacles to the Development of a Scholarly Tradition1." History in Africa 21 (1994): 413–433.
- Jean-Baptiste, Rachel. Multiracial Identities in Colonial French Africa: Race, Childhood, and Citizenship (Cambridge University Press, 2023).
- Ngolet, François. "Ideological manipulations and political longevity: the power of Omar Bongo in Gabon since 1967." African Studies Review 43.2 (2000): 55–71. online
- Rich, Jeremy (2007). A Workman Is Worthy of His Meat: Food and Colonialism in the Gabon Estuary. Lincoln: University of Nebraska Press. ISBN 978-0-8032-0741-7.
- Shaxson, Nicholas (2007). Poisoned Wells: The Dirty Politics of African Oil. New York: Palgrave Macmillan. ISBN 978-1-4039-7194-4.
- Warne, Sophie (2003). Bradt Travel Guide: Gabon and São Tomé and Príncipe. Guilford, CT: Chalfont St. Peter. ISBN 1-84162-073-4.
- Yates, Douglas A. (1996). The Rentier State in Africa: Oil Rent Dependency and Neo-colonialism in the Republic of Gabon. Trenton, NJ: Africa World Press. ISBN 0-86543-520-0.
- Yates, Douglas A. Historical dictionary of Gabon (Rowman & Littlefield, 2017) online Archived 7 September 2023 at the Wayback Machine
- Yates, Douglas. "The dynastic republic of Gabon." Cahiers d’études africaines (2019): 483–513. online Archived 4 July 2023 at the Wayback Machine
- Yates, Douglas A. "The History of Gabon." Oxford Research Encyclopedia of African History (2020).
- Yates, Douglas Andrew. The rentier state in Africa: Oil rent dependency and neocolonialism in the Republic of Gabon (Africa World Press, 1996) online Archived 7 September 2023 at the Wayback Machine.
