= Helene Bresslau Schweitzer =

German missionary, linguist, and social worker (1879-1957)

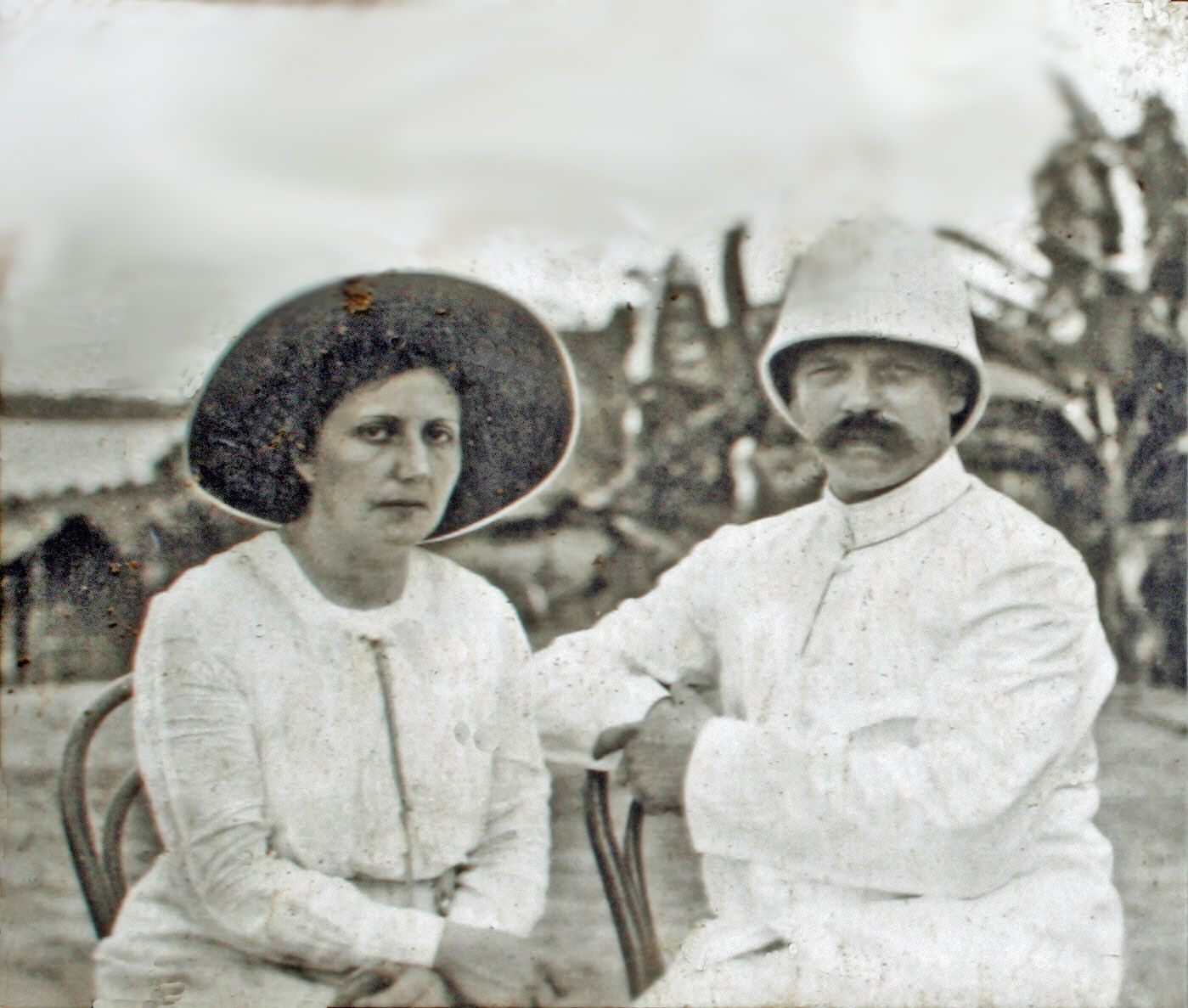
- Helene and her husband Albert
- Born: Helene Bresslau; 25 January 1879; Berlin, Germany
- Died: 1 June 1957 (aged 78); Zurich, Switzerland
- Education: Protestant Deaconess Society
- Known for: Co-founding the Albert Schweitzer Hospital in Lambaréné, Gabon
- Spouse: Albert Schweitzer
- Scientific career
- Fields: Medicine, Nursing, Missionary

Helene Bresslau Schweitzer (25 January 1879 – 1 June 1957) was a German medical missionary, nurse, social worker, linguist, public medicine enthusiast, editor, feminist, sociologist, and the wife/confidant of Albert Schweitzer, who co-founded the Albert Schweitzer Hospital with her. Albert, a medical missionary, did not mention her role in his efforts. According to writer Mary Kingsley, she is "one form of human being whose praise has never adequately been sung, namely, the missionary's wife."

== Early life ==
Helene Bresslau Schweitzer was born to the Bresslau family on 25 January 1879 in Berlin. Her family was ethnically Jewish, and she was baptized into the Christian religion as a result of widespread Anti Semitism. The Bresslaus moved to Alsace, then part of Germany, when she was eleven because of a new job opportunity for her father. Her father, Harry Bresslau, began working at the University of Strasbourg and eventually became chancellor. As a result of the move, Helene adopted French, becoming fluent rather quickly.

In 1898, Bresslau met her future husband, Albert Schweitzer at a wedding. Shortly thereafter, they developed a relationship that included separation, independence, and non-exclusive behaviors. This allowed both to develop their lives while enjoying each other's companionship, conversation, and virtues. The one thing that united the pair was their shared ideology: to take care of others.

Helene became Albert's confidant but did not give up her own life for his. In fact, they spent a great deal of time away from each other and maintained a nontraditional relationship (together but not exclusive). They felt secure remaining undefined as a couple, relying on their friendship through documented letters. The turning point for their relationship occurred when they married on 18 June 1912 in Gunsbach. At this point in their lives, they both decided to marry and go to Africa to fulfill their desire to care for others in need. She quit her job at the orphanage and studied higher level nursing to advance her knowledge before leaving. On Good Friday of 1913, she travelled with Albert to Lambaréné, Gabon, beginning her medical missionary adventure.

== Education and professional development ==
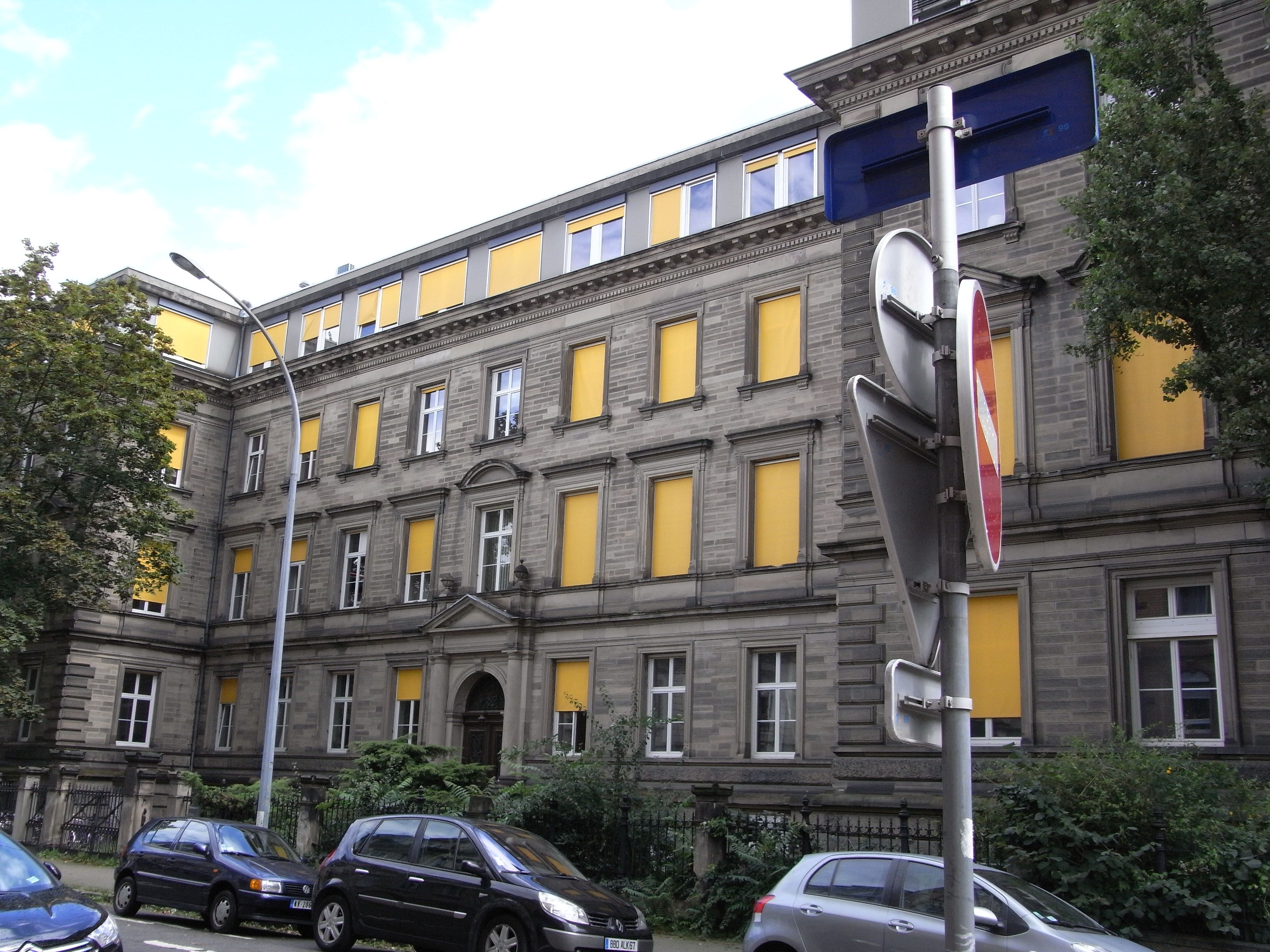
University of Strasbourg, where Schweitzer took courses in medieval, modern, and art history

Aged 6, Helene attended Queen Charlotte's School. In 1890, she transferred to Lindner Girls' High School in Berlin. She began to pursue music studies at a music conservatory from 1897 to 1899. After receiving her teaching credentials in one year rather than the usual two, she worked as a teacher in England, in 1902. Continuing to delve into her passion for learning, Bresslau took courses in medieval, modern, and art history at her father's university, the University of Strasbourg. In pursuit of music, she took voice and piano lessons.

One area of study that interested Bresslau was nursing. She joined the Protestant Deaconess' Society on 1 January 1904 "to complete a course in nursing." After, she was assigned to complete three months of nursing lessons in Stettin. On 1 April 1905 she took a break from nursing and went into social work. Even so, exploring another field other than nursing left her "eager to fill in the gaps" of her nursing knowledge.

She changed her direction of study when she became a municipal inspector for orphans in 1905. She maintained the position from 1905 to 1909. This endeavor attributes largely to part of her own goal to improve the social sphere. However, her home's "Jewish atmosphere" widely influenced her as she was taught to "pay it forward." Including and prior to this job, all of her endeavors were based on her own emotions and goals without Albert's influence. In one of his letters, he notes "it is you who have won, happy to have found a task that will fill your life, and you’ve done it ahead of me", addressing her social work in Strasbourg's City Orphan Administration.

On 1 October 1909 Helene "enrolled as a student in the nursing school of the Protestant Deaconess' Society in Frankfurt in the city hospital" to further her knowledge in the profession, thus beginning her nursing career.

== Missionary work ==
=== Journey with Albert Schweitzer ===
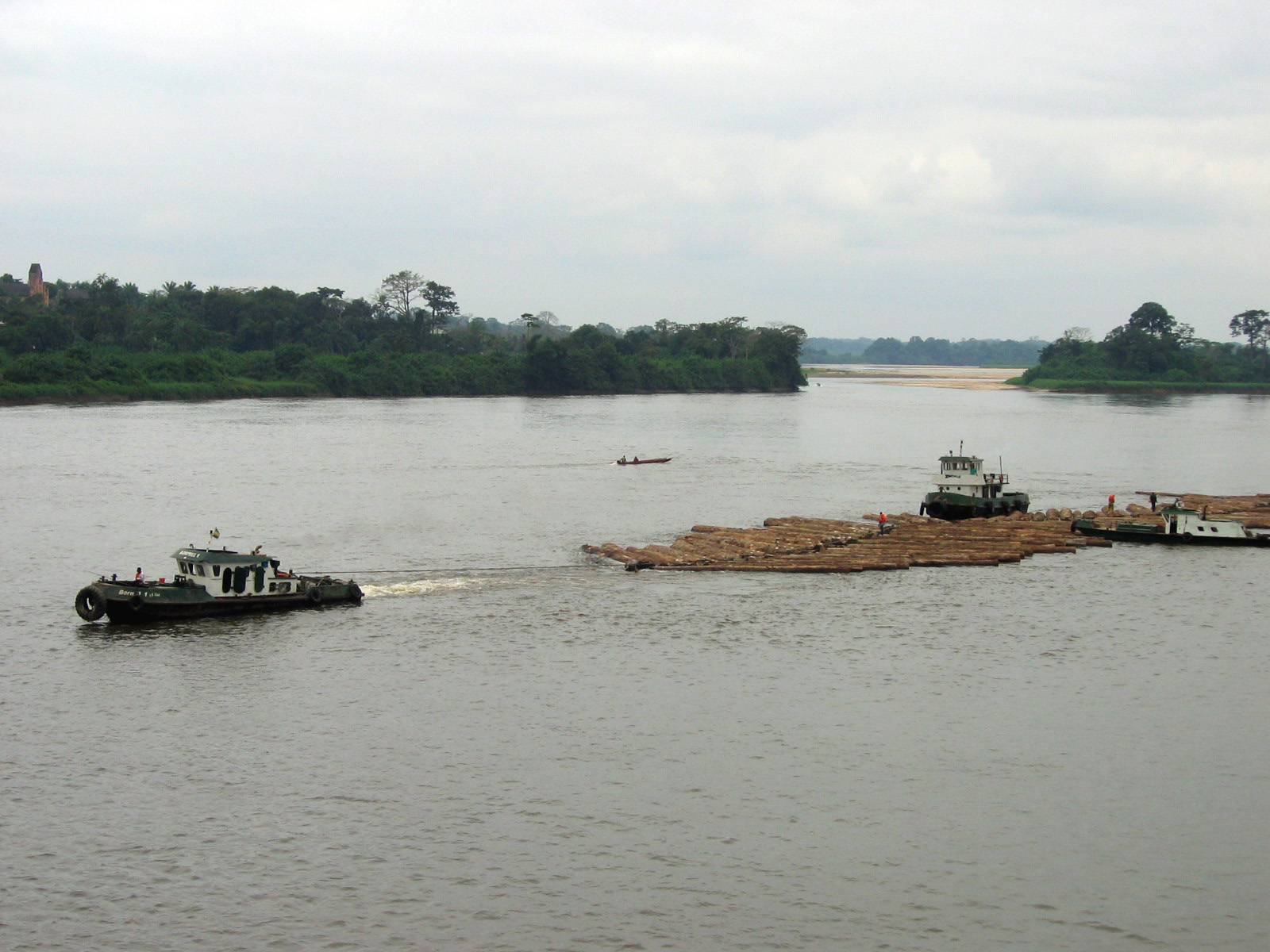
The Ogooué River flowing past Lambaréné

Helene and Albert shared one main common goal: to help improve medicine and the greater good in Lambaréné, Gabon. At the very beginning of their journey, Helene wrote in her diary that "we are truly in love with Africa." In spring 1913, Helene and Albert set off to establish a hospital (Albert Schweitzer Hospital) near an already existing mission post. The site was nearly 200 miles (14 days by raft) upstream from the mouth of the Ogooué at Port Gentil (Cape Lopez) (and so accessible to external communications) but downstream of most tributaries, so that internal communications within Gabon converged towards Lambaréné.

The catchment area of the Ogooé occupies most of Gabon. Lambaréné is marked.

This journey to make medical improvements in Africa allowed Helene to develop herself. Patti Marxsen writes that Helene's "capacity for hard work in a challenging environment can be read as proof that her independence earned in Strasbourg was now unshakeable. For the now thirty-four-year-old Helene Bresslau Schweitzer...a life in Africa offered a chance to integrate multiple aspects of modern identity, perhaps even more so than would have been possible in Europe."

Helene had prior interest in nursing and the medical field before Albert became involved in medicine. Therefore, she played a vital role in his work, acting as a possible influence. In the first nine months, Helene and Albert had about 2,000 patients to examine, some travelling many days and hundreds of kilometers to reach the hospital. In her time in Africa, Helene worked as nurse and helped with the hospital. She played an essential part in sanitation efforts, especially by preparing medical equipment for surgery. She was also an anaesthetist for surgical operations.

=== Challenges ===
When World War I broke out in summer of 1914, the French military put Helene and Albert, who were Germans in a French colony, under supervision at Lambaréné, where they continued their work. In 1917, exhausted by over four years' work and by tropical anaemia, they were taken to Bordeaux and interned first in Garaison and then from March 1918 in Saint-Rémy-de-Provence.

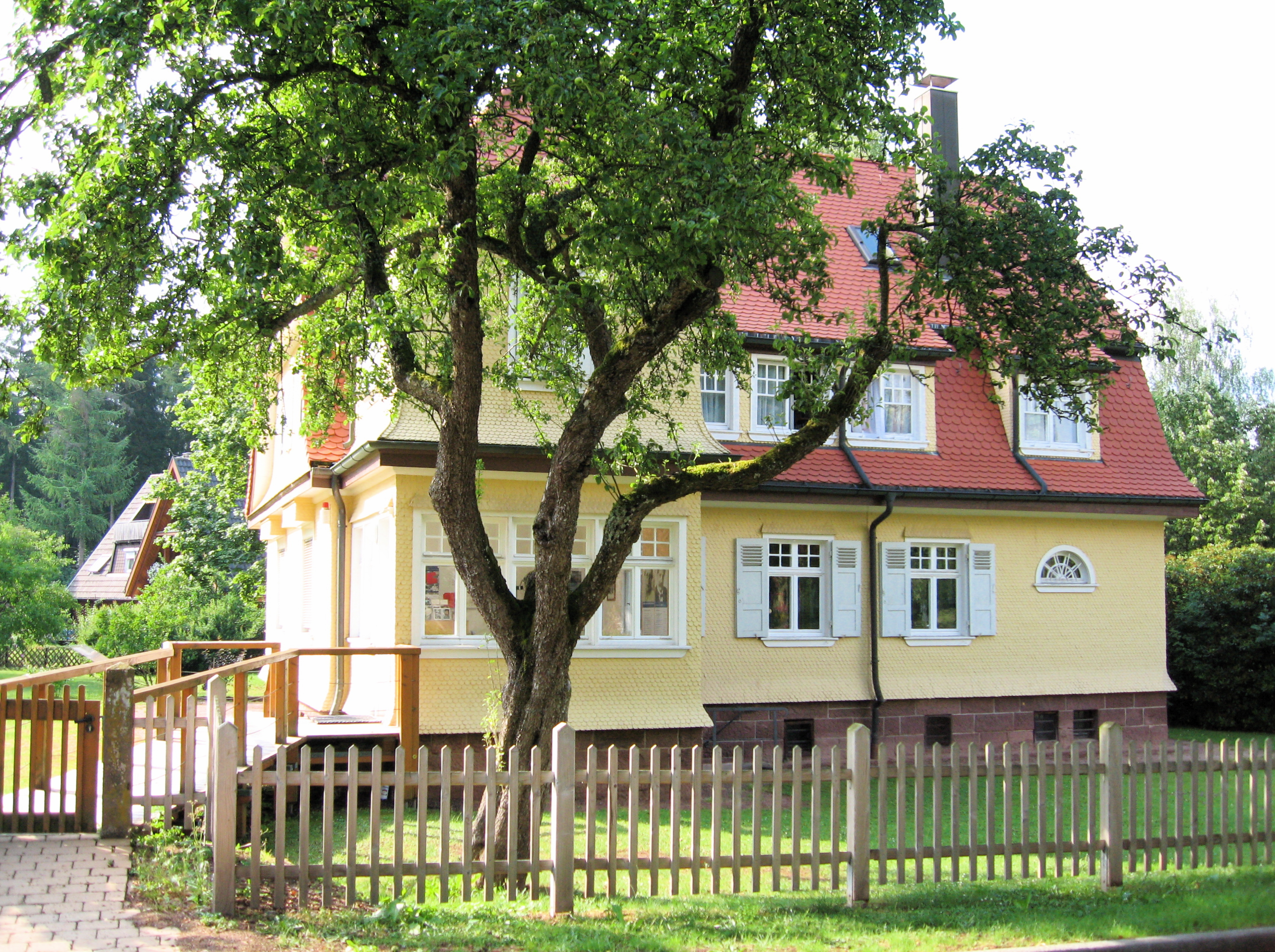
The Schweitzer house and Museum at Königsfeld in the Black Forest

Medical issues forced Helene to leave Africa many times, and sometimes Albert kept her from returning at times. When Albert decided to return to Africa in 1924, he took on an Oxford undergraduate, Noel Gillespie, as assistant, leaving Helene behind. In 1919 after the birth of their daughter (Rhena Schweitzer Miller), Helene was no longer able to live in Lambaréné due to her health. In 1923 the family moved to Königsfeld im Schwarzwald, Baden-Württemberg, where Albert was building a house for the family. This house is now maintained as a Schweitzer museum.

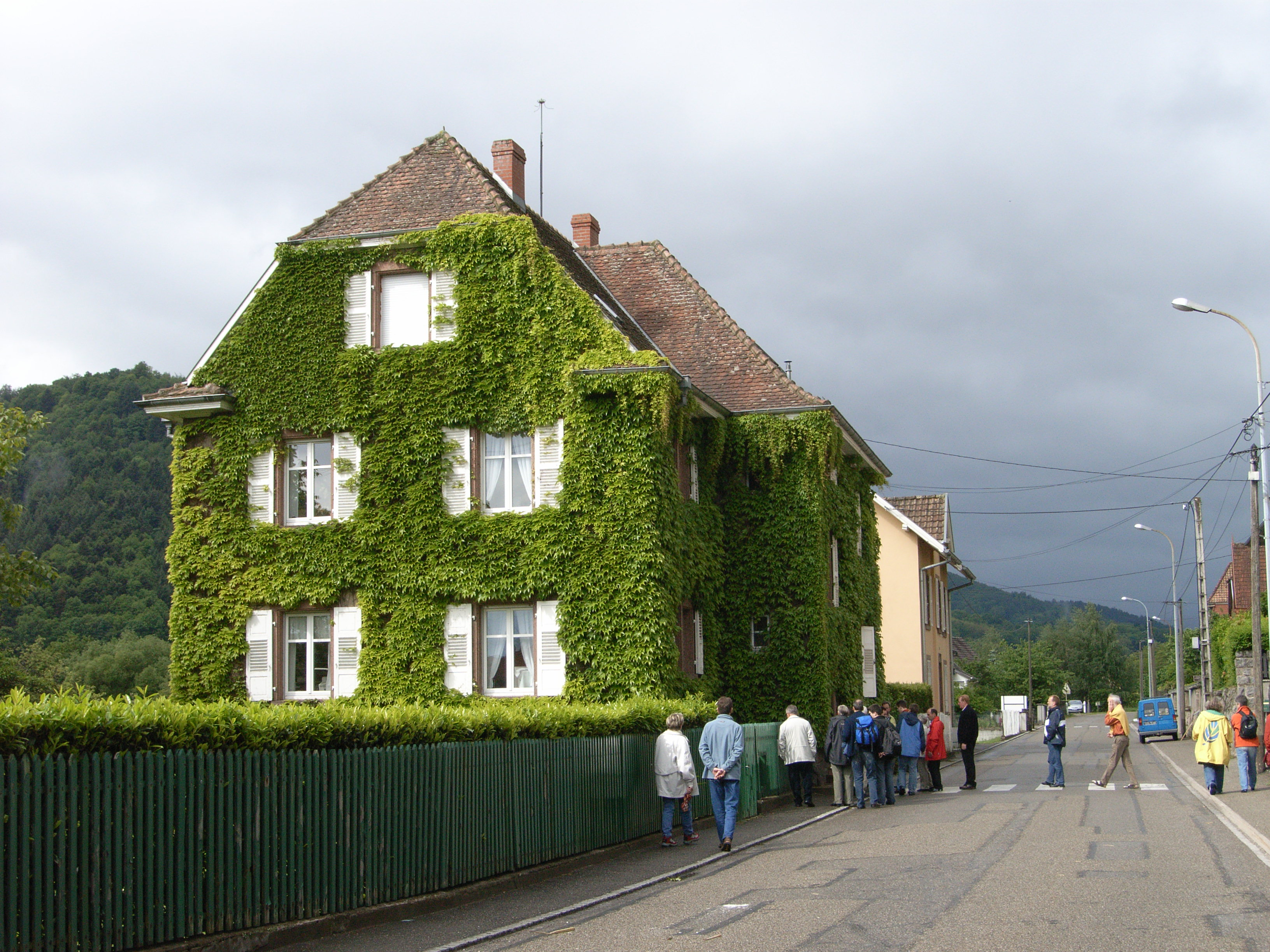
Schweitzer's house at Gunsbach, now a museum and archive

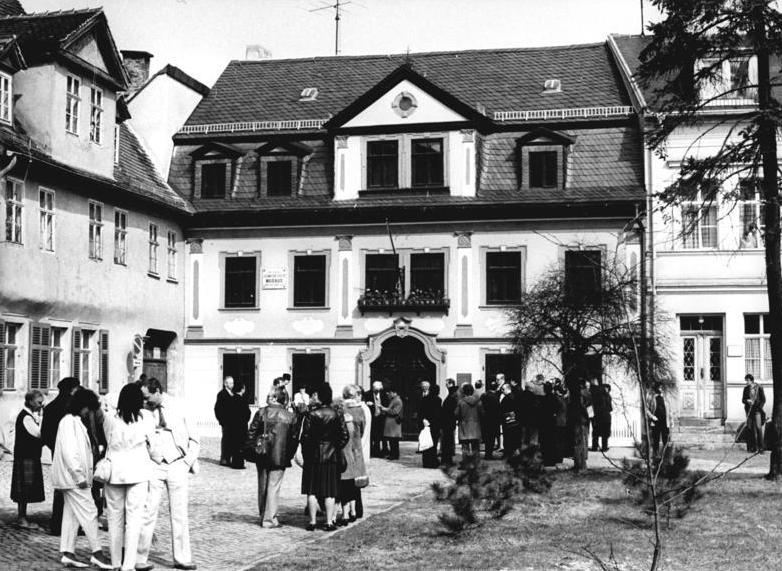
Albert Schweitzer Memorial and Museum in Weimar (1984)

Her not returning to Lambaréné was a sacrifice made "by her husband, not for him." She wrote about not returning, describing it as a "practical matter", but she "never agreed to a separation of three and a half years" from her husband. Despite her poor health, she still took care of her daughter, "engage[d] herself with the Hospital Aid Association," and "enroll[ed] in a three-week course in tropical medicine at the Medical Missionary Institute of Tübingen, Germany." As a motherhood advocate, she gladly took care of her daughter and continued to develop her own personal skills. Helene still remained engaged in helping the mission hospital.

In 1929, after receiving treatment for pneumonia, Helene returned to Lambaréné to see Albert's progression with the new hospital. Shortly after arriving, however, she developed a bad fever and was forced to depart the hospital and her husband to return to Europe for treatment. After recovering, she used her writing skills and began to edit her husband's autobiography. Her English skills also opened the door for "public speaking and networking in the United States." On 1 December 1930 a German newspaper printed one of her speeches. In it, she described her husband's concept, the Fellowship of the Marks of Pain. She turned her medical challenges into positives, explaining that through her suffering she developed a compassionate view of their work that only she could personally attest.

Helene was aware that her husband would receive much of the acclaim for their missionary endeavors, so she set out to make her work known. In October 1946, she began to review her documents and collect them so that she would be understood as a "full partner" in their missionary work. In addition, she began lecture tours in the United States in 1937 to promote the Schweitzer Hospital.; supplies from this fundraising, including medicines and surgical instruments arrived in May 1942.

== Health complications ==
Helene experienced tremendous health issues throughout her life, mostly in relation to her lungs. She first encountered tuberculosis before she turned ten. She was officially diagnosed in the spring of 1922 with laryngeal tuberculosis after exhibiting symptoms of "pain, fever, and coughing up blood." In addition, the heat of Africa caused many respiratory issues. In 1915, she contracted phlebitis resulting in two weeks of therapeutic bed rest. She also had pneumonia in 1929, almost keeping her from returning to Lambaréné. Despite her already weak lungs, she completed the trip, though she had to return early due to illness again.

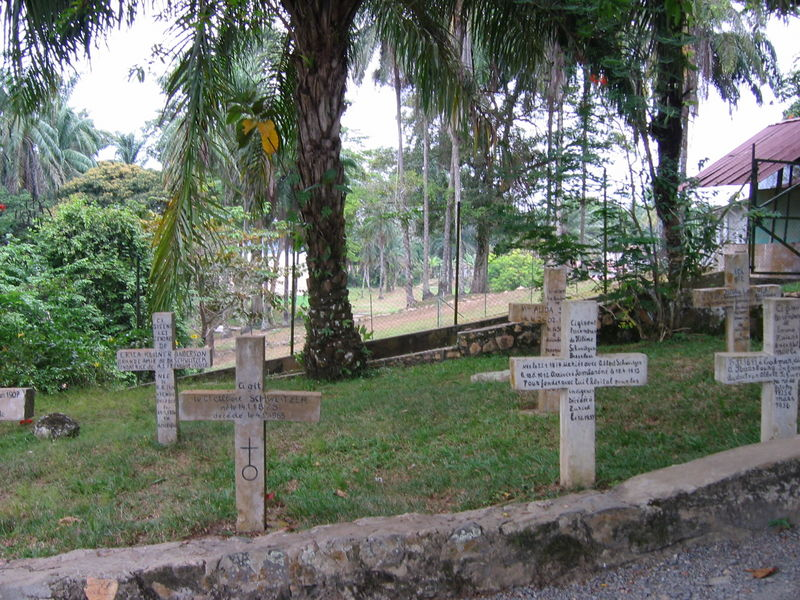
Albert's tomb at a hospital in Lambaréné

Helene Bresslau Schweitzer died on 1 June 1957 and her remains are located in Lambaréné. When Albert died, he was buried next to her. Their graves lie on the banks of the Ogooue River, marked by a cross Albert made himself.

== Legacy ==
Helene contributed greatly to the work done in Lambaréné. A role model as an independent, educated woman with a deep intellectual curiosity, she was "One of the first female students at the University of Strasbourg" and "One of the first female employees in the community administration" at the orphanage. Her aid in the poor relief system, "Armenpflegesystem," mirrored in modern social welfare, saw the illegitimate mortality rate fall. Setting precedence as a female medical missionary in the early 20th century, she established lasting effects of nursing and education in Lambaréné. She co-founded the Schweitzer Hospital, documented much of Albert's autobiography, and "supported the [mission] work with lectures and fund-raising" essential to its upkeep and vivacity.
