= David C. Miller =

American physician

David Critcherson Miller (March 9, 1917 – March 27, 1997) was an American physician and epidemiologist who attended to Albert Schweitzer until the humanitarian's death and later devoted his life to famine and medical relief efforts together with his wife, who was Schweitzer's only child.

== Early life and education ==
Miller was born on March 9, 1917, in Elizabeth, New Jersey, to Benjamin and Mary Elizabeth Critcherson Miller. He was primarily raised in Wadsworth, Ohio. He attended Northwestern University and Antioch College. He married Margaret Edith Barton, a fellow Antioch student, in 1945. After graduating from the Duke University School of Medicine in 1950, he attended Harvard University, where he was awarded a master's degree in public health in 1956.

== Career ==
He was employed by the United States Public Health Service in Washington, D.C., where he was responsible for nutrition programs. Starting in 1957, he was assigned to the Public Health Service Indian Hospital in Tuba City, Arizona, remaining there until 1959.

He went to Gabon in the 1960s to perform a study on heart disease at the Albert Schweitzer Hospital in Gabon. He developed a close relationship with Schweitzer, and cared for him until his death in 1965.

He joined the Centers for Disease Control in Atlanta in 1968. He married Rhena Schweitzer, the only child of Dr. Schweitzer, in 1971, and the two traveled around the world offering medical assistance in Afghanistan, Bangladesh, Ethiopia, Haiti, India, Nigeria, Pakistan, Vietnam and Yemen to those suffering from drought, famine, plague and war. He retired from the CDC in 1980.

Miller co-edited the book The relevance of Albert Schweitzer at the dawn of the 21st century with James Pouilliard, a work originally published by the University Press of America in 1992 that collected papers that had been presented in August 1990 at the United Nations as part of the International Albert Schweitzer Colloquium.

== Death ==
Miller died at age 80 on March 27, 1997, due to lymphoma, at his home in Lavonia, Georgia. In addition to his wife, he was survived by four daughters, a son and two sisters.
