= Rhena Schweitzer Miller =

American humanitarian activist (1919–2009)

Rhena Schweitzer Miller (January 14, 1919 – February 22, 2009) was an American humanitarian activist, the director of the hospital her father founded in west central Africa and a key organizer of the fellowship that bears his name. She was the only child of Helene Bresslau and Albert Schweitzer.

== Life and activism ==
In 1917, Albert Schweitzer and Helene Bresslau Schweitzer had been arrested as German citizens in French Equatorial Africa; the hospital that they had founded there in present-day Gabon in 1913 was closed and they were taken to a prison camp in France. Rhena Schweitzer was born in Strasbourg in Alsace-Lorraine in 1919 right before the territory's post-World War I return to French control following 45 years as part of Germany. With his family still in Europe, Dr. Schweitzer went back to Africa in 1924, with occasional visits from his daughter and wife over the following two decades.

She married Jean Eckert in 1939, whom she later divorced. In 1940, she was asked by her father to form the Albert Schweitzer Fellowship.

She was trained as a medical technician and went to Africa to work at the hospital in Gabon. Following her father's death, she took over the operation of the hospital, remaining in that role until 1970. By the time of her death, the hospital had grown to encompass 150 beds in 12 buildings, serving 35,000 patients annually. In the late 1960s, during the Nigerian Civil War, she took in Ibo children from Biafra into the hospital, and had 20 beds placed in her home when the hospital was full, with two children sleeping in each bed.

She met David C. Miller, her second husband, at the hospital. Miller was a physician who had come to Gabon to perform a study on heart disease at the Albert Schweitzer Hospital and developed a close relationship with Dr. Schweitzer, caring for him at the time of his death in 1965. The couple were married in 1971. They lived in Atlanta and traveled around the world offering medical assistance in Afghanistan, Bangladesh, Ethiopia, Haiti, India, Nigeria, Pakistan, Vietnam and Yemen. David Miller died in March 1997.

Together with Harold Robles, Miller established the Albert Schweitzer Institute for the Humanities in 1984, which later established its headquarters at Quinnipiac University in Hamden, Connecticut. Robles and Miller created the "Reverence for Life Commendation" in 1990 to recognize humanitarian efforts performed in the spirit of Albert Schweitzer.

Rhena Schweitzer Miller died at age 90 on February 22, 2009 in Pacific Palisades, California, at the home of one of her daughters. She was survived by a son and three daughters from her first marriage, eight grandchildren and five great-grandchildren.
