= Harry Bresslau =

German historian (1848–1926)

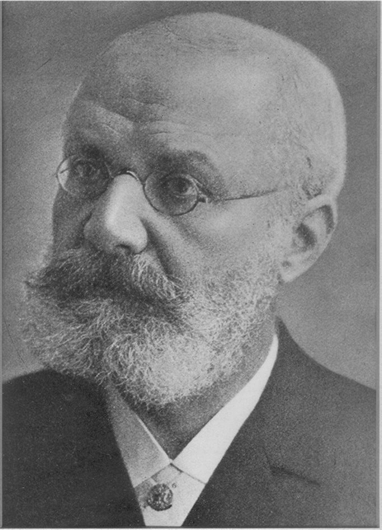
- Born: 22 March 1848; Dannenberg, Kingdom of Hanover
- Died: 27 October 1926 (aged 78); Heidelberg, Baden, Germany

Harry Bresslau (22 March 1848 – 27 October 1926) was a German historian and scholar of state papers and of historical and literary muniments (historical Diplomas). He was born in Dannenberg/Elbe and died in Heidelberg. He is the father of Ernst Bresslau and his daughter, Helene married the polymath, Albert Schweitzer.

== Life ==
=== Training ===
Harry (also Heinrich) Bresslau studied in Göttingen and Berlin: first Law, and then History. During his studies he was a teacher in the Auerbach Orphanage in Berlin. His most important teachers were Johann Gustav Droysen and Leopold von Ranke, whose assistant he became. In 1869 he took a doctorate at Göttingen with Ranke's pupil Georg Waitz, with a thesis on the government of Emperor Conrad II. Immediately before his academic inauguration, he became Senior teacher at the Frankfurt Philanthropin. After his inauguration (1872), in 1877 Bresslau obtained an extraordinary-professorship at Berlin University. He was certainly a convinced National Liberal, and very attached to German nationality, but was a Jew and unbaptized. Hence the path to a regular professorship in Prussia was barred from him.

=== Bresslau and Treitschke ===
When Heinrich von Treitschke published his controversial writings against the Jews in 1879, Bresslau spoke openly and in a determined manner against his elder and senior professional colleague, even though his position as extraordinary-professor had no permanent security. Nonetheless in 1878 Bresslau had worked together with Treitschke, a year before his anti-semitic contribution to the Prussian Annals, in an election-committee of the National-Liberal Party.

Bresslau believed in the possibility of a complete assimilation of German Jewry through an open affirmation of the ideal of German nationhood. Thus he was one of the examples whom Treitschke brought forward as evidence for the proposal that an assimilation of the Jews might be possible.

=== Strasbourg ===
In 1890 Bresslau accepted a professorship at Strasbourg in Alsace, where he held an ordinary (i.e. full) professorship of History at the University until 1912. There he developed a thorough-going teaching and research programme and made himself a leading National-Liberal advocate for German identity. Shortly after the end of the First World War, on 1 December 1918, the French expelled Bresslau from Strasbourg as a 'militant pan-Germanist'.

When in 1904 the Academic-Historical Society in Berlin, to which Bresslau had belonged for 25 years, turned itself into an association ("Holsatia") wearing badges or liveries, and required other forms of co-operation from Bresslau, he bluntly refused. Holsatia had introduced a veto against admission for Jewish students.

Bresslau spent the final years of his life first in Hamburg, then in Heidelberg. His son was the zoologist Ernst Bresslau. His daughter was the medical missionary, nurse, social worker, and public health advocate Helene Bresslau Schweitzer.

== Work ==
=== Monumenta Germaniae Historica ===
Bresslau was involved from 1877 in the Monumenta Germaniae Historica, and from 1888 in its central planning. For the Diploma section of the Monumenta he edited the original charters of Henry II, Holy Roman Emperor (Part 1: 1900, Part 2: 1903) and of Konrad II (1909). Bresslau's Handbuch der Urkundenlehre für Deutschland und Italien (Handbook of Charter and Diploma Studies for Germany and Italy), (2nd enlarged edition, Leipzig 1912) has even today not been superseded as the standard work on medieval Diplomas. For the Centenary of the Monumenta in 1919 Bresslau wrote the history of the project (Geschichte der Monumenta Germaniae Historica, Hanover 1921, reprinted Hanover 1976), his last book. As research supervisor, Bresslau supervised over 100 doctoral dissertations.

=== Historical Commission for the History of Jews in Germany ===
Under Bresslau's chairmanship in 1885, the Historical Commission for the History of the Jews in Germany was founded by the Union of German-Jewish Congregations. On the model of the Monumenta Germaniae Historica and the Historical Commission of the Bavarian Academy of Sciences, the relevant source-material was sought out and usefully assembled for research. Bresslau obstructed the co-option of the popular historian Heinrich Graetz, because he believed that the official recognition of Graetz as a historical writer would dangerously aggravate the relationship between Jews and Christians. Graetz had evolved a sort of Judaeo-centric view of history, which was most sharply criticized in the Berlin anti-semitism controversies. Bresslau himself was a leading exponent of positivist science. The Historical Commission published until 1892 the Journal for the History of the Jews in Germany.

== Sources ==
- Harry Bresslau: 'Autobiographical statement', in Sigfrid Steinberg (Ed.), Die Geschichtswissenschaft der Gegenwart in Selbstdarstellungen (Historical science of the present in autobiographical statements), Vol. 2, 1926, pp. 29–83.
- Paul Fridolin Kehr, 'Harry Bresslau' (Obituary). In Neues Archiv 47 (1927), p. 251–266.
- Hans Liebeschütz, Das Judentum im deutschen Geschichtsbild von Hegel bis Max Weber (Jewry in German historical writing from Hegel to Max Weber), (J.C.B.Mohr (Paul Siebeck), Tübingen 1967).
- Peter Rück (Ed.), Erinnerung an Harry Bresslau zum 150. Geburtstag (A Memorial for Harry Bresslau for his 150th birthday). First issued at the day-conference on the 21 March 1998 in the Institute for Historical Auxiliary Sciences of the Philipps-University, Marburg; reproduced in Erika Eisenlohr and Peter Worm (Eds.), 'Fachgebiet Historische Hilfswissenschaften' (Classification of historical auxiliary sciences), (Marburg 2000), pp. 245–283. ISBN 3-8185-0304-4
- Peter Rück, in collaboration with Erika Eisenlohr and Peter Worm (Eds.), Abraham Bresslau: Briefe aus Dannenberg 1835–1839. Mit einer Einleitung zur Familiengeschichte des Historikers Harry Bresslau (1848–1926) und zur Geschichte der Juden in Dannenberg.(Abraham Bresslau: Letters from Dannenberg 1835-1839, with an account of the family history of the historian Harry Bresslau (1848-1926) and of the history of the Jews in Dannenberg), (Marburg 2007).
- Peter Rück, in collaboration with Erika Eisenlohr and Peter Worm (Eds.), Harry Bresslau: Berliner Kolleghefte 1866–č1869. Nachschriften zu Vorlesungen von Mommsen, Jaffé, Köpke, Ranke, Droysen. (Harry Bresslau: Berlin Lecture Notebooks 1866-1869. Transcripts of lectures of Mommsen, etc.), (Marburg 2007).
