= Gunsbach =

Commune in Grand Est, France

- Commune
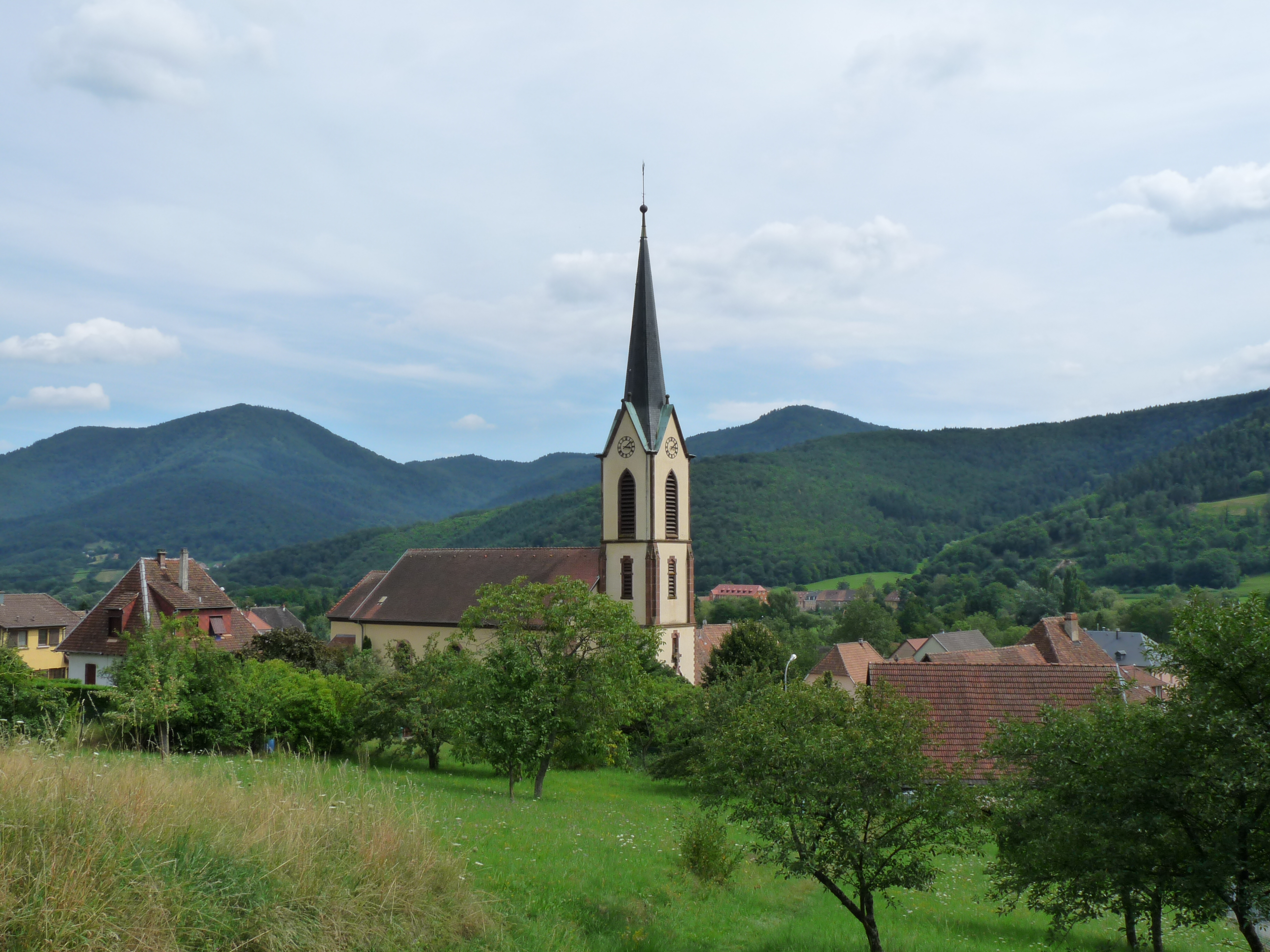
- The church of Gunsbach

- Coat of arms
- Location of Gunsbach
- Location within France Location within Grand Est
- Coordinates: 48°02′54″N 7°10′36″E
- Country: France
- Region: Grand Est
- Department: Haut-Rhin
- Arrondissement: Colmar-Ribeauvillé
- Canton: Wintzenheim
- Intercommunality: Vallée de Munster

Government
  - Mayor (2020–2026): André Tingey
- Area^{1}: 6.18 km^{2} (2.39 sq mi)
- Elevation: 340 m (1,120 ft)
- Highest elevation: 985 m (3,232 ft)
- Lowest elevation: 326 m (1,070 ft)
- Population (2023): 856
  - Density: 139/km^{2} (359/sq mi)
- Time zone: UTC+01:00 (CET)
  - Summer (DST): UTC+02:00 (CEST)
- INSEE/Postal code: 68117 /68140
- ^{1} French Land Register data, which excludes lakes, ponds, glaciers > 1 km^{2} (0.386 sq mi or 247 acres) and river estuaries.

Gunsbach (German: Günsbach) is a village and commune in the Haut-Rhin department in Grand Est in north-eastern France.

The first mention of Gunsbach is in 1285, when the land was given Lord Conrad Werner of Hattstatt. In 1434, Gunsbach was sold to the Ribeaupierre family, remaining in their possession until the French Revolution in 1789.

== People ==
Albert Schweitzer grew up here in the late 19th century, when the region had been incorporated to the German Empire. The village is home to the International Albert Schweitzer Association (French: Association Internationale Albert Schweitzer, "AISL") with a small museum and an archive.

== See also ==
- Communes of the Haut-Rhin département
