= Albert Schweitzer =

German polymath (1875–1965)

The Reverend Albert Schweitzer OM
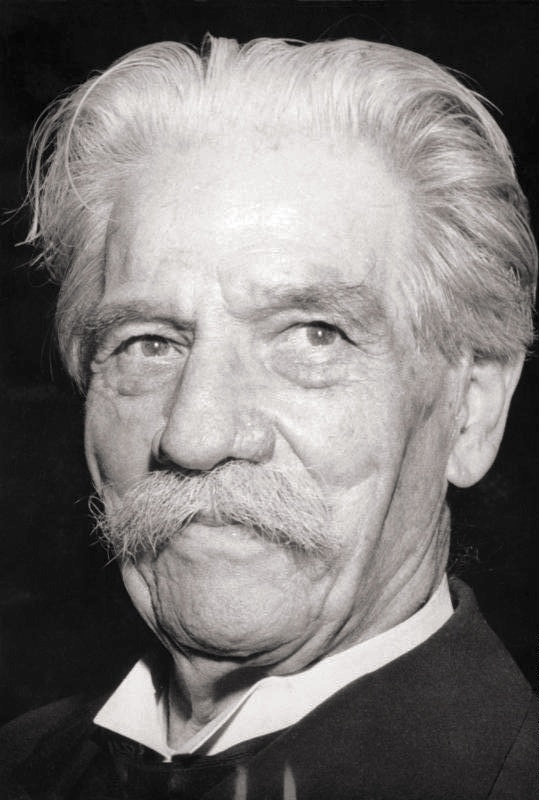
- Schweitzer in 1955
- Born: Ludwig Philipp Albert Schweitzer; 14 January 1875; Kaysersberg, Alsace–Lorraine, German Empire
- Died: 4 September 1965 (aged 90); Lambaréné, Gabon
- Citizenship: Germany (until 1919); France (from 1919)
- Education: University of Strasbourg
- Known for: Quest for the historical Jesus; Reverence for Life; Consistent "thorough-going" eschatology (posthumously)
- Spouse: Helene Bresslau (m. 1912; died 1957)
- Awards: Goethe Prize (1928); Nobel Peace Prize (1952); James Cook Medal (1959)
- Scientific career
- Fields: Medicine; musicology; philosophy; theology
- Workplaces: University of Strasbourg
- Doctoral advisor: Theobald Ziegler
- Other academic advisors: Heinrich Julius Holtzmann; Friedrich Paulsen; Robert Wollenberg

Ludwig Philipp Albert Schweitzer (German: [ˈalbɛʁt ˈʃvaɪtsɐ]; 14 January 1875 – 4 September 1965) was a German polymath from Alsace. He was a theologian, organist, musicologist, writer, humanitarian, philosopher, and physician. As a Lutheran minister, Schweitzer challenged both the secular view of the historical Jesus as depicted by the historical-critical method current at this time, as well as the traditional Christian view. His contributions to the interpretation of Pauline Christianity concern the role of Paul's mysticism of "being in Christ" as primary and the doctrine of justification by faith as secondary.

He received the 1952 Nobel Peace Prize for his philosophy of "Reverence for Life". His philosophy was expressed in many ways, but most famously in founding and sustaining the Hôpital Albert Schweitzer in Lambaréné, French Equatorial Africa (now Gabon). As a music scholar and organist, he studied the music of German composer Johann Sebastian Bach and influenced the Organ Reform Movement (Orgelbewegung).

== Early years ==
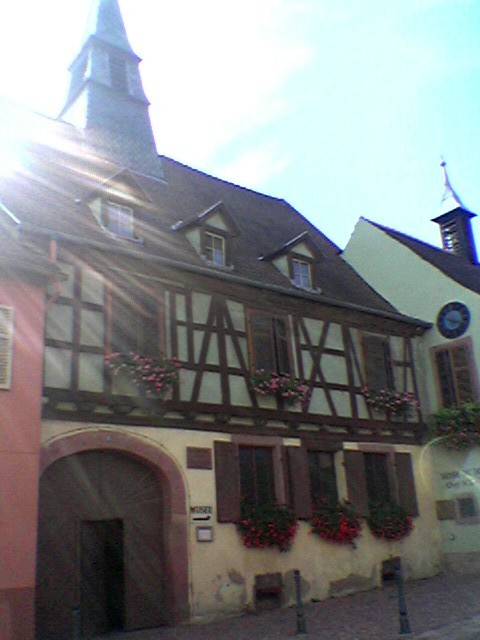
Albert Schweitzer's birthplace in Kaysersberg, now in Alsace in France

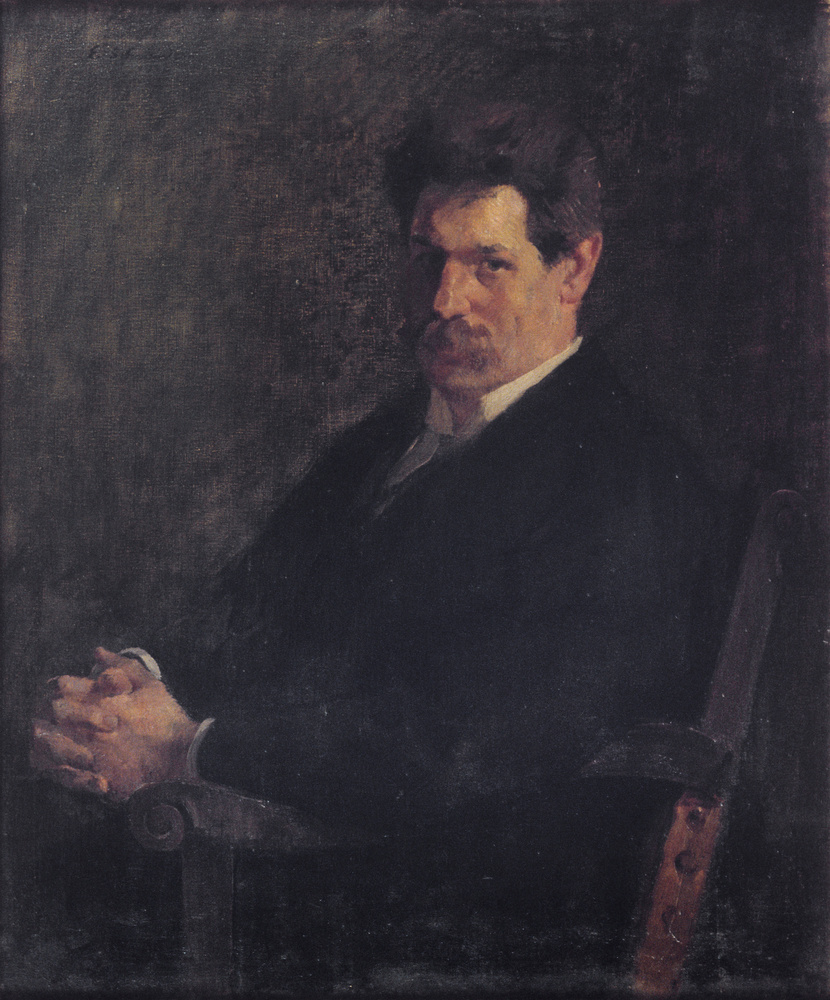
Schweitzer in 1912. Oil on canvas painting by Émile Schneider, Strasbourg Museum of Modern and Contemporary Art

Schweitzer was born on 14 January 1875 in Kaysersberg in Alsace, in what had less than four years previously become the Imperial Territory of Alsace-Lorraine in the German Empire. He later became a citizen of France after World War I, when Alsace became French territory again. He was the son of Adèle (née Schillinger) and Louis Théophile Schweitzer. He spent his childhood in Gunsbach, also in Alsace, where his father, the local Lutheran-Evangelical pastor of the EPCAAL, taught him how to play music. The tiny village would become home to the Association Internationale Albert Schweitzer (AIAS).

The medieval parish church of Gunsbach was shared by the Protestant and Catholic congregations, which held their prayers in different areas at different times on Sundays. This compromise arose after the Protestant Reformation and the Thirty Years' War. Schweitzer, the pastor's son, grew up in this exceptional environment of religious tolerance, and developed the belief that true Christianity should always work towards a unity of faith and purpose.

Schweitzer's first language was the Alsatian dialect of German. At the Mulhouse gymnasium he received his "Abitur" (the certificate at the end of secondary education) in 1893. He studied organ in Mulhouse from 1885 to 1893 with Eugène Munch, organist at the Protestant cathedral, who inspired Schweitzer with his enthusiasm for the music of German composer Richard Wagner. In 1893, he played for the French organist Charles-Marie Widor (at Saint-Sulpice, Paris), for whom Johann Sebastian Bach's organ music contained a mystic sense of the eternal. Widor, deeply impressed, agreed to teach Schweitzer without fee, and a great and influential friendship thus began.

From 1893 Schweitzer studied Protestant theology at the Kaiser Wilhelm University in Strasbourg. There he also received instruction in piano and counterpoint from professor Gustav Jacobsthal, and associated closely with Ernest Munch, the brother of his former teacher, organist of St William church, who was also a passionate admirer of J. S. Bach's music. Schweitzer served his one-year compulsory military service in 1894. Schweitzer saw many operas of Richard Wagner in Strasbourg under Otto Lohse, and in 1896 he managed to afford a visit to the Bayreuth Festival to see Wagner's Der Ring des Nibelungen and Parsifal, both of which impressed him.

In 1898, he returned to Paris to write a PhD dissertation on The Religious Philosophy of Kant at the Sorbonne, and to study in earnest with Widor. Here he often met with the elderly Aristide Cavaillé-Coll. He also studied piano at that time with Marie Jaëll. In 1899, Schweitzer spent the summer semester at the University of Berlin and eventually obtained his theology degree at the University of Strasbourg. He published his PhD thesis at the University of Tübingen in 1899.

In 1905, Schweitzer began his study of medicine at the University of Strasbourg, culminating in the degree of M.D. in 1913.

== Music ==
Schweitzer rapidly gained prominence as a musical scholar and organist, dedicated also to the rescue, restoration and study of historic pipe organs. With theological insight, he interpreted the use of pictorial and symbolical representation in J. S. Bach's religious music. In 1899, he astonished Widor by explaining figures and motifs in Bach's chorale preludes as painter-like tonal and rhythmic imagery illustrating themes from the words of the hymns on which they were based. They were works of devotional contemplation in which the musical design corresponded to literary ideas, conceived visually. Widor had not grown up with knowledge of the old Lutheran hymns.

The exposition of these ideas, encouraged by Widor and Munch, became Schweitzer's last task, and appeared in the masterly study J. S. Bach: Le Musicien-Poète, written in French and published in 1905. There was great demand for a German edition, but, instead of translating it, he decided to rewrite it. The result was two volumes (J. S. Bach), which were published in 1908 and translated into English by Ernest Newman in 1911. Ernst Cassirer, a contemporaneous German philosopher, called it "one of the best interpretations" of Bach.

During its preparation, Schweitzer became a friend of Cosima Wagner, then resident in Strasbourg, with whom he had many theological and musical conversations, exploring his view of Bach's descriptive music, and playing the major Chorale Preludes for her at the Temple Neuf. Schweitzer's interpretative approach greatly influenced the modern understanding of Bach's music. He became a welcome guest at the Wagners' home, Wahnfried. He also corresponded with composer Clara Faisst, who became a good friend.

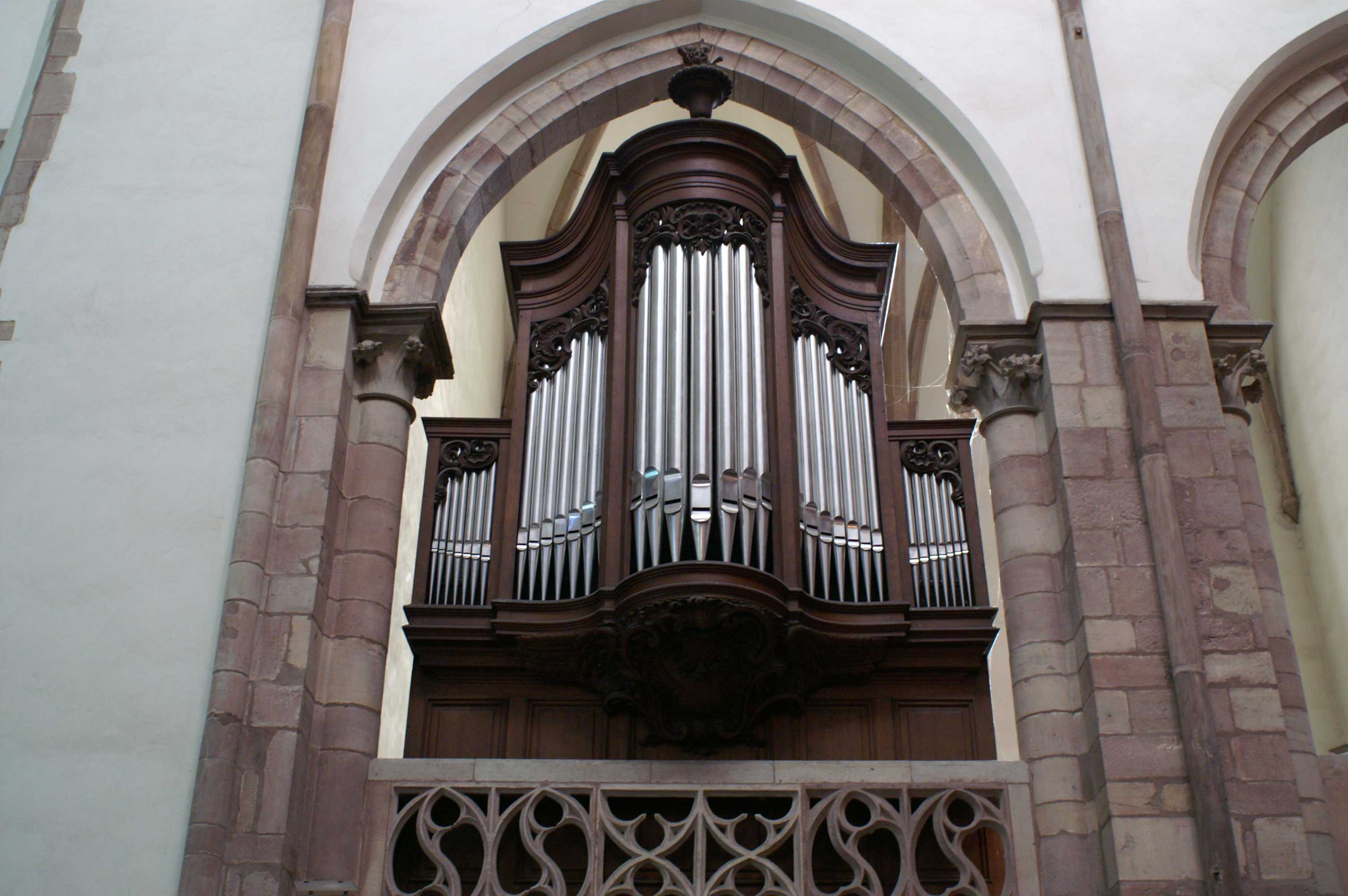
The Choir Organ at St Thomas' Church, Strasbourg, designed in 1905 on principles defined by Schweitzer

His 1906 pamphlet "The Art of Organ Building and Organ Playing in Germany and France", republished with an appendix on the state of the organ-building industry in 1927, effectively launched the 20th-century Orgelbewegung, which turned away from romantic extremes and rediscovered baroque principles—although this sweeping reform movement in organ building eventually went further than Schweitzer had intended. In 1909, he addressed the Third Congress of the International Society of Music at Vienna on the subject. Having circulated a questionnaire among players and organ-builders in several European countries, he produced a very considered report.

This provided the basis for the International Regulations for Organ Building. He envisaged instruments in which the French late-romantic full-organ sound should work integrally with the English and German romantic reed pipes, and with the classical Alsace Silbermann organ resources and baroque flue pipes, all in registers regulated (by stops) to access distinct voices in fugue or counterpoint capable of combination without loss of distinctness: different voices singing the same music together.

Schweitzer also studied piano under Isidor Philipp, head of the piano department at the Paris Conservatory.

In 1905, Widor and Schweitzer were among the six musicians who founded the Paris Bach Society, a choir dedicated to performing J. S. Bach's music, for whose concerts Schweitzer took the organ part regularly until 1913. He was also appointed organist for the Bach Concerts of the Orféo Català at Barcelona, Spain, and often travelled there for that purpose. He and Widor collaborated on a new edition of Bach's organ works, with detailed analysis of each work in English, French, and German. Schweitzer, who insisted that the score should show Bach's notation with no additional markings, wrote the commentaries for the Preludes and Fugues, and Widor those for the Sonatas and Concertos: six volumes were published in 1912–14. Three more, to contain the Chorale Preludes with Schweitzer's analyses, were to be worked on in Africa, but these were never completed, perhaps because for him they were inseparable from his evolving theological thought.

On departure for Lambaréné in 1913, he was presented with a pedal piano, a piano with pedal attachments to operate like an organ pedal-keyboard. Built especially for the tropics, it was delivered by river in a huge dug-out canoe to Lambaréné, packed in a zinc-lined case. At first, he regarded his new life as a renunciation of his art, and fell out of practice, but after some time he resolved to study and learn by heart the works of Bach, Mendelssohn, Widor, César Franck, and Max Reger systematically. It became his custom to play during the lunch hour and on Sunday afternoons. Schweitzer's pedal piano was still in use at Lambaréné in 1946. According to a visitor, Dr. Gaine Cannon, of Balsam Grove, North Carolina, the old, dilapidated piano-organ was still being played by Dr. Schweitzer in 1962, and stories told that "his fingers were still lively" on the old instrument at 88 years of age.

Sir Donald Tovey dedicated his conjectural completion of Bach's The Art of Fugue to Schweitzer.

Schweitzer's recordings of organ music, and his innovative recording technique, are described below.

One of his pupils was conductor and composer Hans Münch.

== Theology ==
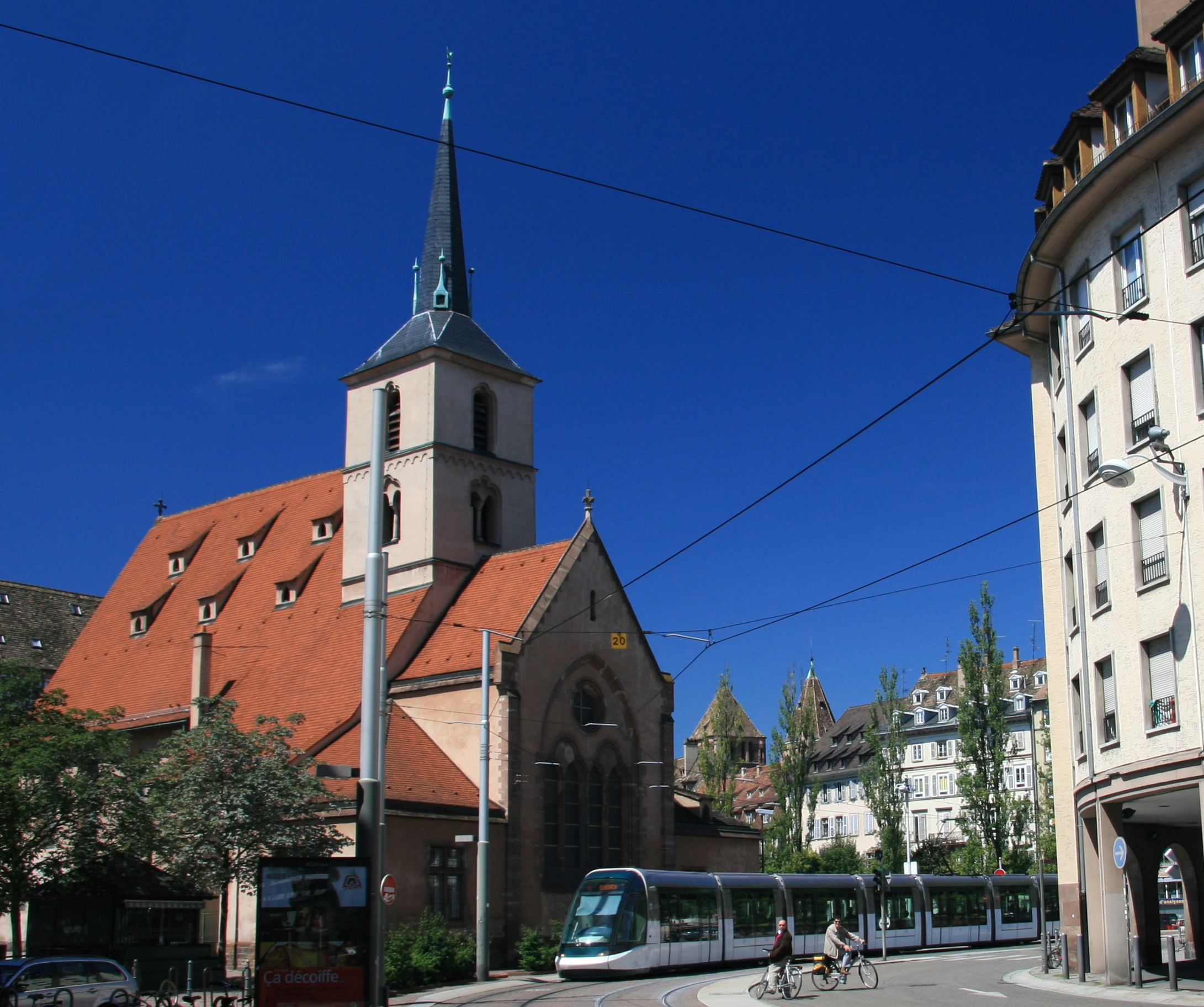
Saint-Nicolas, Strasbourg

In 1899, Schweitzer became a deacon at the church of Saint Nicholas in Strasbourg. In 1900, with the completion of his licentiate in theology, he was ordained as priest, and that year he witnessed the Oberammergau Passion Play. In the following year, he became provisional Principal of the Theological College of Saint Thomas, from which he had just graduated, and in 1903 his appointment was made permanent. (Note: He officiated at the wedding of Theodor Heuss (later the first President of West Germany) in 1908.)

In 1906, he published Geschichte der Leben-Jesu-Forschung (History of Life-of-Jesus research). This book, which established his reputation, was first published in English in 1910 as The Quest of the Historical Jesus. Under this title the book became famous in the English-speaking world. A second German edition was published in 1913, containing theologically significant revisions and expansions: this revised edition did not appear in English until 2001. In 1931, he published Mystik des Apostels Paulus (The Mysticism of Paul the Apostle). A second edition was published in 1953.

=== The Quest of the Historical Jesus (1906) ===
In The Quest, Schweitzer criticised the liberal view put forward by liberal and romantic scholars during the first quest for the historical Jesus. Schweitzer maintained that the life of Jesus must be interpreted in the light of Jesus' own convictions, which reflected late Jewish eschatology and apocalypticism. Schweitzer writes:

The Jesus of Nazareth who came forward publicly as the Messiah, who preached the ethic of the kingdom of God, who founded the kingdom of heaven upon earth and died to give his work its final consecration never existed. He is a figure designed by rationalism, endowed with life by liberalism, and clothed by modern theology in a historical garb. This image has not been destroyed from outside; it has fallen to pieces...

Instead of these liberal and romantic views, Schweitzer wrote that Jesus and his followers expected the imminent end of the world. Schweitzer cross-referenced the many New Testament verses declaring imminent fulfilment of the promise of the World's ending within the lifetime of Jesus's original followers.

He wrote that in his view, in the Gospel of Mark, Jesus speaks of a "tribulation", with his "coming in the clouds with great power and glory." In Mark 13:30 Jesus says "This generation will not pass away until all these things have taken place." In Matthew 16:28 Jesus says "Truly I tell you, some who are standing here will not taste death before they see the Son of Man coming in his kingdom." Obviously, Jesus and his followers truly believed that he would return within the disciples lifetime and specifically states the timeframe that it will happen, but it has not! "This generation shall not pass, till all these things be fulfilled" (Matthew, 24:34) or, "have taken place" (Luke 21:32). Similarly, in 1st Peter 1:20, "Christ, who verily was foreordained before the foundation of the world but was manifest in these last times for you", as well as "But the end of all things is at hand" (1 Peter 4:7) and "Surely, I come quickly." (Revelation 22:20). Either Jesus, his disciples and/or the noted chapter authors were and remain seriously mistaken; the promised second return timeframe has long ago passed.

Schweitzer concluded his treatment of Jesus with what has been called the most famous words of twentieth-century theology:

He comes to us as One unknown, without a name, as of old, by the lake-side, He came to those men who knew him not. He speaks to us the same word: 'Follow thou me' and sets us to the task which He has to fulfill for our time. He commands. And to those who obey Him, whether they be wise or simple, He will reveal Himself in the toils, the conflicts, the sufferings which they shall pass through in His fellowship, and as an ineffable mystery, they shall learn in their own experience Who He is.

=== The Mysticism of Paul the Apostle (1931) ===
In The Mysticism of Paul the Apostle, Schweitzer first distinguishes between two categories of mysticism: primitive and developed. Primitive mysticism "has not yet risen to a conception of the universal, and is still confined to naive views of earthly and super-earthly, temporal and eternal". Additionally, he argues that this view of a "union with the divinity, brought about by efficacious ceremonies, is found even in quite primitive religions".

On the other hand, a more developed form of mysticism can be found in the Greek mystery-cults that were popular in first-century A.D. society. These included the cults of Attis, Osiris, and Mithras. A developed form of mysticism is attained when the "conception of the universal is reached and a man reflects upon his relation to the totality of being and to Being in itself". Schweitzer claims that this form of mysticism is more intellectual and can be found "among the Brahmans and in the Buddha, in Platonism, in Stoicism, in Spinoza, Schopenhauer, and Hegel".

Next, Schweitzer poses the question: "Of what precise kind then is the mysticism of Paul?" He locates Paul between the two extremes of primitive mysticism and developed mysticism. Paul stands high above primitive mysticism, due to his intellectual writings, but never speaks of being one with God or being in God. Instead, he conceives of sonship to God as "mediated and effected by means of the mystical union with Christ". He summarizes Pauline mysticism as "being in Christ" rather than "being in God".

Paul's imminent eschatology, from his background in Jewish eschatology, causes him to believe that the kingdom of God has not yet come and that Christians are now living in the time of Christ. Christ-mysticism holds the field until God-mysticism becomes possible, which is in the near future. Therefore, Schweitzer argues that Paul is the only theologian who does not claim that Christians can have an experience of "being-in-God". Rather, Paul uses the phrase "being-in-Christ" to illustrate how Jesus is a mediator between the Christian community and God. Additionally, Schweitzer explains how the experience of "being-in-Christ" is not a "static partaking in the spiritual being of Christ, but as the real co-experiencing of His dying and rising again". The "realistic" partaking in the mystery of Jesus is only possible within the solidarity of the Christian community.

One of Schweitzer's major arguments in The Mysticism of Paul the Apostle is that Paul's mysticism, marked by his phrase "being in Christ", gives the clue to the whole of Pauline theology. Rather than reading justification by faith as the main topic of Pauline thought, which has been the most popular argument set forward by Martin Luther, Schweitzer argues that Paul's emphasis was on the mystical union with God by "being in Christ". Jaroslav Pelikan, in his foreword to The Mysticism of Paul the Apostle, points out that:

the relation between the two doctrines was quite the other way around: 'The doctrine of the redemption, which is mentally appropriated through faith, is only a fragment from the more comprehensive mystical redemption-doctrine, which Paul has broken off and polished to give him the particular refraction which he requires.

==== Paul's "realism" versus Hellenistic "symbolism" ====
Schweitzer contrasts Paul's "realistic" dying and rising with Christ to the "symbolism" of Hellenism. Although Paul is widely influenced by Hellenistic thought, he is not controlled by it. Schweitzer explains that Paul focused on the idea of fellowship with the divine being through the "realistic" dying and rising with Christ rather than the "symbolic" Hellenistic act of becoming like Christ through deification. After baptism, Christians are continually renewed throughout their lifetimes due to participation in the dying and rising with Christ (most notably through the Sacraments). On the other hand, the Hellenist "lives on the store of experience which he acquired in the initiation" and is not continually affected by a shared communal experience.

Another major difference between Paul's "realism" and Hellenistic "symbolism" is the exclusive nature of the former and the inclusive nature of the latter. Schweitzer unabashedly emphasizes the fact that "Paul's thought follows predestinarian lines". He explains, "only the man who is elected thereto can enter into relation with God". Although every human being is invited to become a Christian, only those who have undergone the initiation into the Christian community through baptism can share in the "realistic" dying and rising with Christ.

== Medicine ==
At the age of 30, in 1905, Schweitzer answered the call of The Society of the Evangelist Missions of Paris, which was looking for a physician. The committee of this missionary society was not ready to accept his offer, considering his Lutheran theology to be "incorrect". He could easily have obtained a place in a German evangelical mission, but wished to follow the original call despite the doctrinal difficulties. Amid a hail of protests from his friends, family and colleagues, he resigned from his post and re-entered the university as a student in a three-year course towards the degree of Doctorate in Medicine, a subject in which he had little knowledge or previous aptitude. He planned to spread the Gospel by the example of his Christian labour of healing, rather than through the verbal process of preaching, and believed that this service should be acceptable within any branch of Christian teaching.

Even in his study of medicine, and through his clinical course, Schweitzer pursued the ideal of the philosopher-scientist. He completed his studies successfully at the end of 1911. His medical degree dissertation was another work on the historical Jesus, Die psychiatrische Beurteilung Jesu. Darstellung und Kritik (The psychiatric evaluation of Jesus. Description and criticism), published in English in 1948 as The Psychiatric Study of Jesus. Exposition and Criticism. He defended Jesus' mental health in it. In June 1912, he married Helene Bresslau, municipal inspector for orphans and daughter of the Jewish pan-Germanist historian Harry Bresslau.

In 1912, now armed with a medical degree, Schweitzer made a definite proposal to go as a physician to work at his own expense in the Paris Missionary Society's mission at Lambaréné on the Ogooué river, in what is now Gabon, in Africa, then a French colony. He refused to attend a committee to inquire into his doctrine, but met each committee member personally and was at last accepted. Through concerts and other fund-raising, he was ready to equip a small hospital.

In early 1913, he and his wife set off to establish a hospital, the Hôpital Albert Schweitzer, near an existing mission post. The site was nearly 200 miles, 14 days by raft, upstream from the mouth of the Ogooué at Port Gentil (Cape Lopez). It was accessible to external communications, but downstream of most tributaries, so that internal communications within Gabon converged towards Lambaréné.

The catchment area of the Ogooué River occupies most of Gabon. Lambaréné is marked centre left.

In the first nine months, he and his wife had about 2,000 patients to examine, some travelling many days and hundreds of kilometres to reach him. In addition to injuries, he was often treating severe sandflea and crawcraw infections, yaws, tropical eating sores, heart disease, tropical dysentery, tropical malaria, sleeping sickness, leprosy, fevers, strangulated hernias, necrosis, abdominal tumours and chronic constipation and nicotine poisoning, while also attempting to deal with deliberate poisonings, fetishism and fear of cannibalism among the Mbahouin.

Schweitzer's wife, Helene Schweitzer, served as an anaesthetist for surgical operations. After briefly occupying a shed formerly used as a chicken hut, in late 1913 they built their first hospital of corrugated iron, with a consulting room and operating theatre and with a dispensary and sterilising room. The waiting room and dormitory were built, like native huts, of unhewn logs along a path leading to the boat landing. The Schweitzers had their own bungalow and employed as their assistant Joseph, a French-speaking Mpongwe, who first came to Lambaréné as a patient.

After World War I broke out in July 1914, Schweitzer and his wife, German citizens in a French colony when the countries were at war, were put under supervision by the French military at Lambaréné, where Schweitzer continued his work. In 1917, exhausted by over four years' work and by tropical anaemia, they were taken to Bordeaux and interned first in Garaison and then from March 1918 in Saint-Rémy-de-Provence. In July 1918, after being transferred to his home in Alsace, he was a free man again. At this time Schweitzer, born a German citizen, had his parents' former pre-1871 French citizenship reinstated, and became a French citizen.

Working as a medical assistant and assistant-pastor in Strasbourg, he advanced his project on the philosophy of civilization, which had occupied his mind since 1900. By 1920, his health recovering, he was giving organ recitals and doing other fund-raising work to repay borrowings and raise funds for returning to Gabon. In 1922, he delivered the Dale Memorial Lectures in the University of Oxford, and from these in the following year appeared Volumes I and II of his great work, The Decay and Restoration of Civilization and Civilization and Ethics. The two remaining volumes, on The World-View of Reverence for Life and a fourth on the Civilized State, were never completed.

In 1924, Schweitzer returned to Africa without his wife, but with an Oxford undergraduate, Noel Gillespie, as his assistant. Everything was heavily decayed, and building and doctoring progressed together for months. He now had salvarsan for treating syphilitic ulcers and framboesia. Additional medical staff, nurse (Miss) Kottmann and Dr. Victor Nessmann, joined him in 1924, and Dr. Mark Lauterberg in 1925; the growing hospital was staffed by native orderlies. Later Dr. Trensz replaced Nessmann, and Martha Lauterberg and Hans Muggenstorm joined them. Joseph also returned. In 1925–6, new hospital buildings were constructed, and also a ward for white patients, so that the site became like a village. The onset of famine and a dysentery epidemic created fresh problems.

Much of the building work was carried out with the help of local people and patients. Drug advances for sleeping sickness included Germanin and tryparsamide. Trensz conducted experiments showing that the non-amoebic strain of dysentery was caused by a paracholera vibrion (facultative anaerobic bacteria). With the new hospital built and the medical team established, Schweitzer returned to Europe in 1927, this time leaving a functioning hospital at work.

He was there again from 1929 to 1932. Gradually his opinions and concepts became acknowledged, not only in Europe, but worldwide. There was a further period of work in 1935. In January 1937, he returned to Lambaréné and continued working there throughout World War II.

=== Hospital conditions ===
In 1953, the journalist James Cameron visited Lambaréné, when Schweitzer was 78, and found significant flaws in the practices and attitudes of Schweitzer and his staff. The hospital suffered from squalor and was without modern amenities, and Schweitzer had little contact with the local people. Cameron did not make public what he had seen at the time: according to a BBC dramatisation, he made the unusual journalistic decision to withhold the story, and resisted the expressed wish of his employers to publish an exposé.

The poor conditions of the hospital in Lambaréné were also famously criticized by Nigerian professor and novelist Chinua Achebe in his essay on Joseph Conrad's novel Heart of Darkness: "In a comment which has often been quoted Schweitzer says: 'The African is indeed my brother but my junior brother.' And so he proceeded to build a hospital appropriate to the needs of junior brothers with standards of hygiene reminiscent of medical practice in the days before the germ theory of disease came into being."

Schweitzer's biographer Edgar Berman, who was a volunteer surgeon at Lambarene for several months and had extended conversations with Schweitzer, has a different perspective. Schweitzer felt that patients were better off, and the hospital functioned better given the severe lack of funding, if patients' families lived on the hospital grounds during treatment. Surgical survival rates were, Berman asserts, as high as in many fully equipped western hospitals. The volume of patients needing care, the difficulty of obtaining materials and supplies, and the scarcity of trained medical staff willing to work long hours in the remote setting for almost no pay all argued for a spartan setting with an emphasis on high medical standards nevertheless.

== Schweitzer's views ==
=== Colonialism ===
Schweitzer considered his work as a medical missionary in Africa to be his response to Jesus' call to become "fishers of men".

Who can describe the injustice and cruelties that in the course of centuries they [the coloured peoples] have suffered at the hands of Europeans?... If a record could be compiled of all that has happened between the white and the coloured races, it would make a book containing numbers of pages which the reader would have to turn over unread because their contents would be too horrible.

Schweitzer was one of colonialism's harshest critics. In a sermon that he preached on 6 January 1905, before he had told anyone of his plans to dedicate the rest of his life to work as a physician in Africa, he said:

Our culture divides people into two classes: civilized men, a title bestowed on the persons who do the classifying; and others, who have only the human form, who may perish or go to the dogs for all the 'civilized men' care.

Oh, this 'noble' culture of ours! It speaks so piously of human dignity and human rights and then disregards this dignity and these rights of countless millions and treads them underfoot, only because they live overseas or because their skins are of different colour or because they cannot help themselves. This culture does not know how hollow and miserable and full of glib talk it is, how common it looks to those who follow it across the seas and see what it has done there, and this culture has no right to speak of personal dignity and human rights...

I will not enumerate all the crimes that have been committed under the pretext of justice. People robbed native inhabitants of their land, made slaves of them, let loose the scum of mankind upon them. Think of the atrocities that were perpetrated upon people made subservient to us, how systematically we have ruined them with our alcoholic 'gifts', and everything else we have done... We decimate them, and then, by the stroke of a pen, we take their land so they have nothing left at all...

If all this oppression and all this sin and shame are perpetrated under the eye of the German God, or the American God, or the British God, and if our states do not feel obliged first to lay aside their claim to be 'Christian'—then the name of Jesus is blasphemed and made a mockery. And the Christianity of our states is blasphemed and made a mockery before those poor people. The name of Jesus has become a curse, and our Christianity—yours and mine—has become a falsehood and a disgrace, if the crimes are not atoned for in the very place where they were instigated. For every person who committed an atrocity in Jesus' name, someone must step in to help in Jesus' name; for every person who robbed, someone must bring a replacement; for everyone who cursed, someone must bless.

And now, when you speak about missions, let this be your message: We must make atonement for all the terrible crimes we read of in the newspapers. We must make atonement for the still worse ones, which we do not read about in the papers, crimes that are shrouded in the silence of the jungle night ...

In a second memoir, he exalted colonialism as a moral good:

When the indigenous people express their discontent for being dominated by the whites, I tell them that without us they would no longer exist, since they would have killed each other off or would have ended up in the cooking-pot of the Pahouins [also known as the Fang, a leading Gabonese tribe]. They cannot rebut this argument. In general, despite the mischief for which the whites are guilty in their work of colonisation everywhere, they can however assert that they have brought peace to conquered peoples.

=== Paternalism ===
Schweitzer was nonetheless still sometimes accused of being paternalistic in his attitude towards Africans. For instance, he thought that Gabonese independence came too early, without adequate education or accommodation to local circumstances. Edgar Berman quotes Schweitzer as having said in 1960, "No society can go from the primeval directly to an industrial state without losing the leavening that time and an agricultural period allow." Schweitzer believed dignity and respect must be extended to blacks, while also sometimes characterizing them as children.

He summarized his views on European-African relations by saying "With regard to the negroes, then, I have coined the formula: 'I am your brother, it is true, but your elder brother.'" Chinua Achebe has criticized him for this characterization, though Achebe acknowledges that Schweitzer's use of the word "brother" at all was, for a European of the early 20th century, an unusual expression of human solidarity between Europeans and Africans. Schweitzer eventually emended and complicated this notion with his later statement that "The time for speaking of older and younger brothers has passed".

American journalist John Gunther visited Lambaréné in the 1950s and reported Schweitzer's patronizing attitude towards Africans. He also noted the lack of Africans trained to be skilled workers. By comparison, his English contemporary Albert Ruskin Cook in Uganda had been training nurses and midwives since the 1910s, and had published a manual of midwifery in the local language of Luganda. After three decades in Africa, Schweitzer still depended on Europe for nurses.

In line with his well-documented racial views, he once summarized:

A word in conclusion about the relations between the whites and the blacks. What must be the general character of the intercourse between them? Am I to treat the black man as my equal or my inferior? I must show him that I can respect the dignity of the human personality in every one, and this attitude in me he must be able to see for himself; but the essential thing is that there should be a real feeling of brotherliness. How far this is to find complete expression in the sayings and doings of daily life must be settled by circumstances. The negro is a child, and with children nothing can be done without the use of authority. We must therefore so arrange the circumstances of daily life that my natural authority can find expression. With regard to the negroes, then, I have coined the formula: "I am your brother, it is true, but your elder brother."

== Reverence for life ==
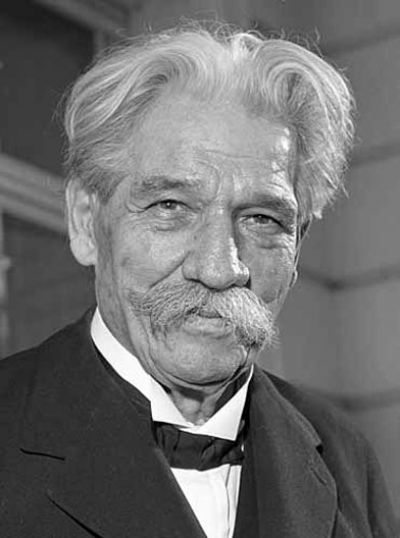
Schweitzer in 1955

The keynote of Schweitzer's personal philosophy, which he considered to be his greatest contribution to mankind, was the idea of Reverence for Life (Ehrfurcht vor dem Leben). He thought that Western civilization was decaying because it had abandoned affirmation of life as its ethical foundation.

In the Preface to Civilization and Ethics (1923) he argued that Western philosophy from Descartes to Kant had set out to explain the objective world expecting that humanity would be found to have a special meaning within it. But no such meaning was found, and the rational, life-affirming optimism of the Age of Enlightenment began to evaporate. A rift opened between this world-view, as material knowledge, and the life-view, understood as Will, expressed in the pessimist philosophies from Schopenhauer onward. Scientific materialism, advanced by Herbert Spencer and Charles Darwin, portrayed an objective world process devoid of ethics, entirely an expression of the will-to-live.

Schweitzer wrote, "True philosophy must start from the most immediate and comprehensive fact of consciousness, and this may be formulated as follows: 'I am life which wills to live, and i exist in the midst of life which wills to live.'" In nature one form of life must always prey upon another. However, human consciousness holds an awareness of, and sympathy for, the will of other beings to live. An ethical human strives to escape from this contradiction so far as possible.

Though we cannot perfect the endeavour we should strive for it: the will-to-live constantly renews itself, for it is both an evolutionary necessity and a spiritual phenomenon. Life and love are rooted in this same principle, in a personal spiritual relationship to the universe. Ethics themselves proceed from the need to respect the wish of other beings to exist as one does towards oneself. Even so, Schweitzer found many instances in world religions and philosophies in which the principle was denied, not least in the European Middle Ages, and in the Indian Brahminic philosophy.

For Schweitzer, mankind had to accept that objective reality is ethically neutral. It could then affirm a new Enlightenment through spiritual rationalism, by giving priority to volition or ethical will as the primary meaning of life. Mankind had to choose to create the moral structures of civilization: the worldview must derive from the life-view, not vice versa. Respect for life, overcoming coarser impulses and hollow doctrines, leads the individual to live in the service of other people and of every living creature. In contemplation of the will-to-life, respect for the life of others becomes the highest principle and the defining purpose of humanity.

Such was the theory which Schweitzer sought to put into practice in his own life. According to some authors, Schweitzer's thought, and specifically his development of reverence for life, was influenced by Indian religious thought and in particular the Jain principle of ahimsa, or non-violence. Albert Schweitzer noted the contribution of Indian influence in his book Indian Thought and Its Development:

The laying down of the commandment to not kill and to not damage is one of the greatest events in the spiritual history of mankind. Starting from its principle, founded on world and life denial, of abstention from action, ancient Indian thought—and this is a period when in other respects ethics have not progressed very far—reaches the tremendous discovery that ethics know no bounds. So far as we know, this is for the first time clearly expressed by Jainism.

Further on ahimsa and the reverence for life in the same book, he elaborates on the ancient Indian didactic work of the Tirukkural, which he observed that, like the Buddha and the Bhagavad Gita, "stands for the commandment not to kill and not to damage". Translating several couplets from the work, he remarked that the Kural insists on the idea that "good must be done for its own sake" and said, "There hardly exists in the literature of the world a collection of maxims in which we find so much lofty wisdom."

== Later life ==
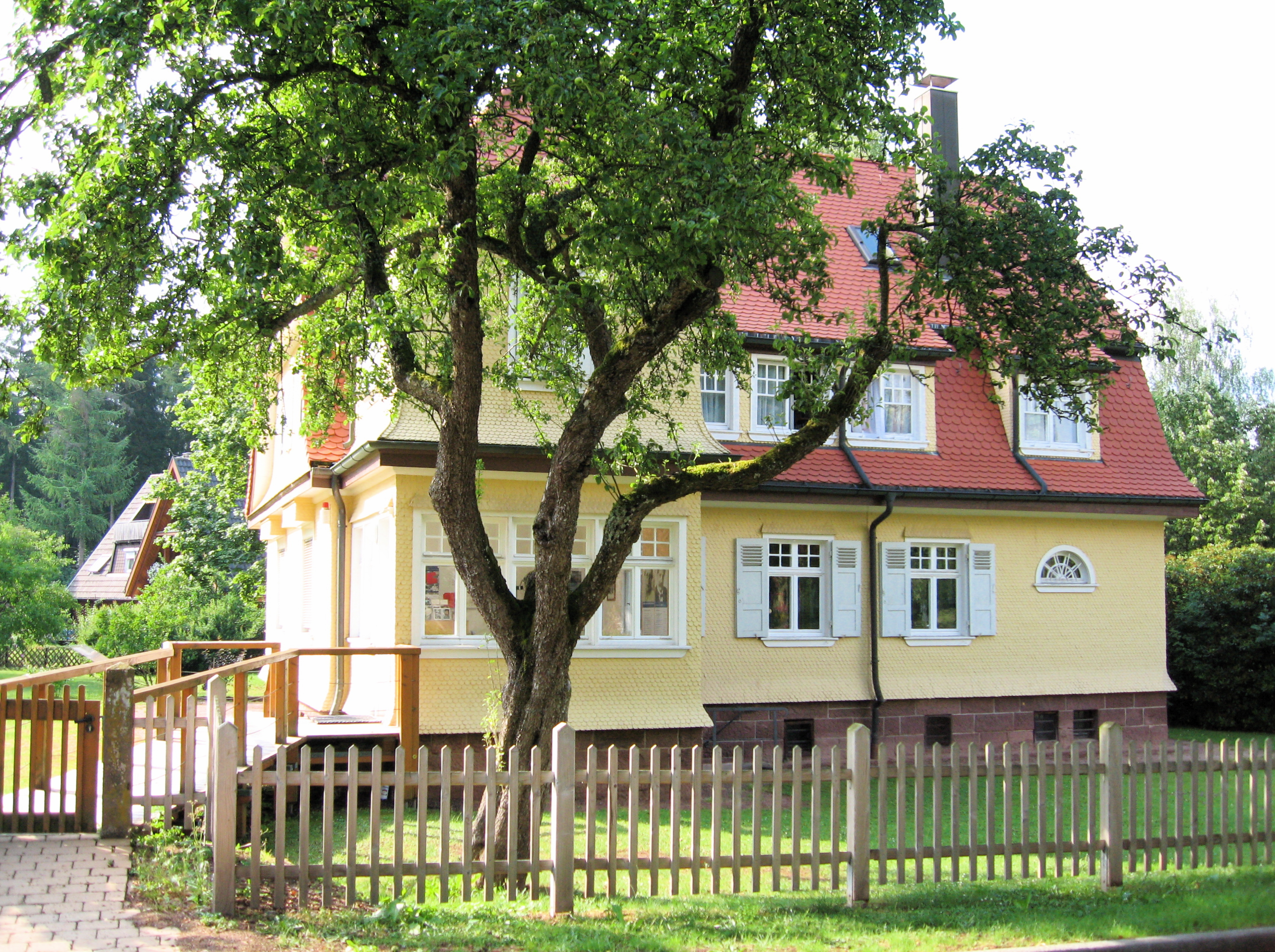
The Schweitzer house and Museum at Königsfeld in the Black Forest

After the birth of their daughter (Rhena Schweitzer Miller), Albert's wife, Helene Schweitzer was no longer able to live in Lambaréné due to her health. In 1923, the family moved to Königsfeld im Schwarzwald, Baden-Württemberg, where he was building a house for the family. This house is now maintained as a Schweitzer museum.

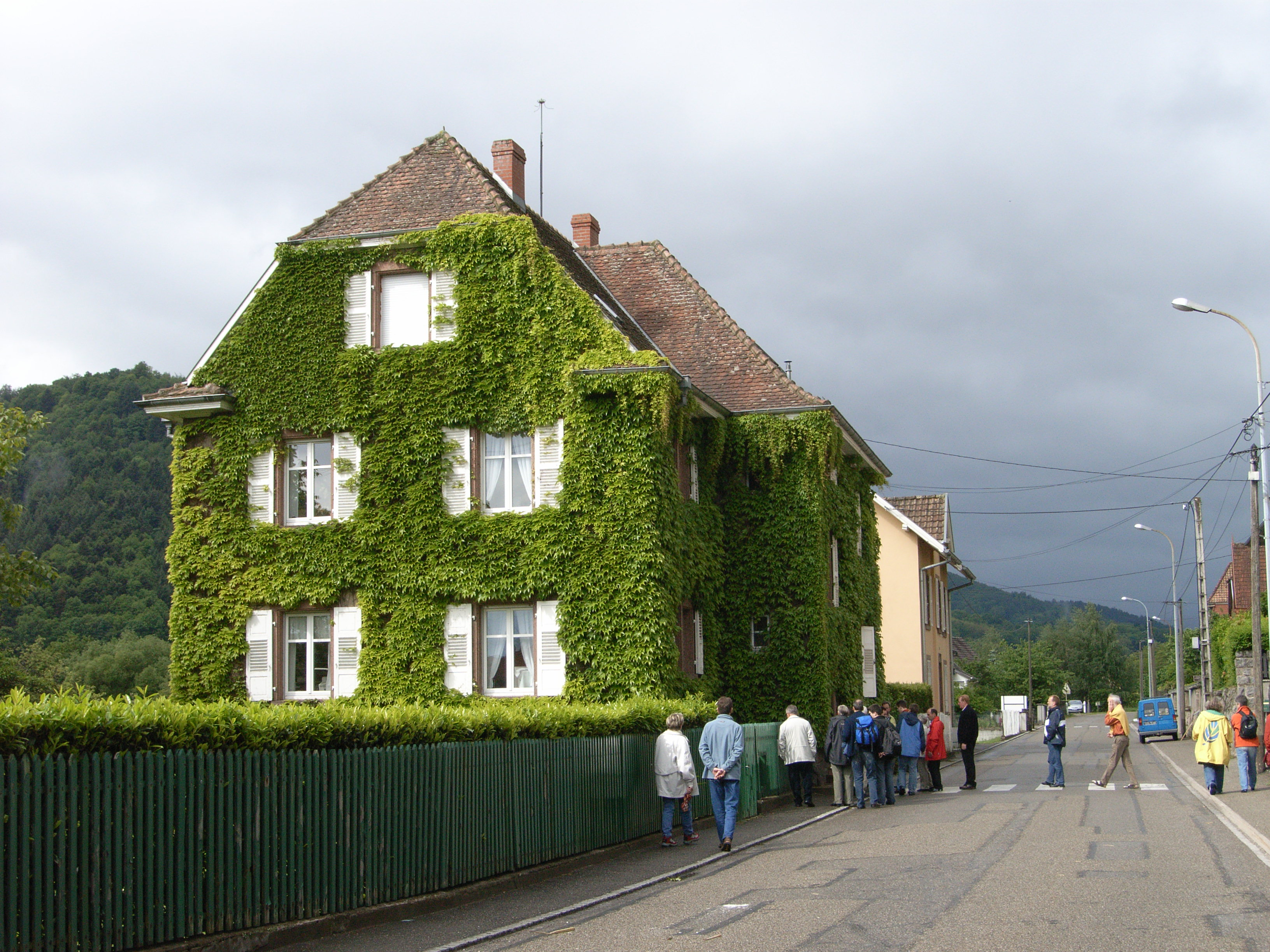
Albert Schweitzer's house at Gunsbach, now a museum and archive

From 1939 to 1948, he stayed in Lambaréné, unable to return to Europe because of the war. Three years after the end of World War II, in 1948, he returned for the first time to Europe and kept travelling back and forth (and once to the US) as long as he was able. During his return visits to his home village of Gunsbach, Schweitzer continued to use the family house, which after his death became an archive and museum of his life and work. His life was portrayed in the 1952 movie Il est minuit, Docteur Schweitzer, starring Pierre Fresnay as Albert Schweitzer and Jeanne Moreau as his nurse Marie. Schweitzer inspired actor Hugh O'Brian when O'Brian visited in Africa. O'Brian returned to the United States and founded the Hugh O'Brian Youth Leadership Foundation (HOBY).

Schweitzer was awarded the Nobel Peace Prize of 1952, accepting the prize with the speech, "The Problem of Peace". With the $33,000 prize money, he started the leprosarium at Lambaréné. From 1952 until his death he worked against nuclear tests and nuclear weapons with Albert Einstein, Otto Hahn and Bertrand Russell. In 1957 and 1958, he broadcast four speeches over Radio Oslo, which were published in Peace or Atomic War.

In 1957, Schweitzer was one of the founders of The Committee for a Sane Nuclear Policy. On 23 April 1957, Schweitzer made his "Declaration of Conscience" speech; it was broadcast to the world over Radio Oslo, pleading for the abolition of nuclear weapons. His speech ended, "The end of further experiments with atom bombs would be like the early sunrays of hope which suffering humanity is longing for."

Weeks prior to his death, an American film crew was allowed to visit Schweitzer and Drs. Muntz and Friedman, both Holocaust survivors, to record his work and daily life at the hospital. The film The Legacy of Albert Schweitzer, narrated by Henry Fonda, was produced by Warner Brothers and aired once. It resides in their vault today in deteriorating condition. Although several attempts have been made to restore and re-air the film, all access has been denied.

In 1955, he was made an honorary member of the Order of Merit (OM) by Queen Elizabeth II. He was also a chevalier of the Military and Hospitaller Order of Saint Lazarus of Jerusalem.

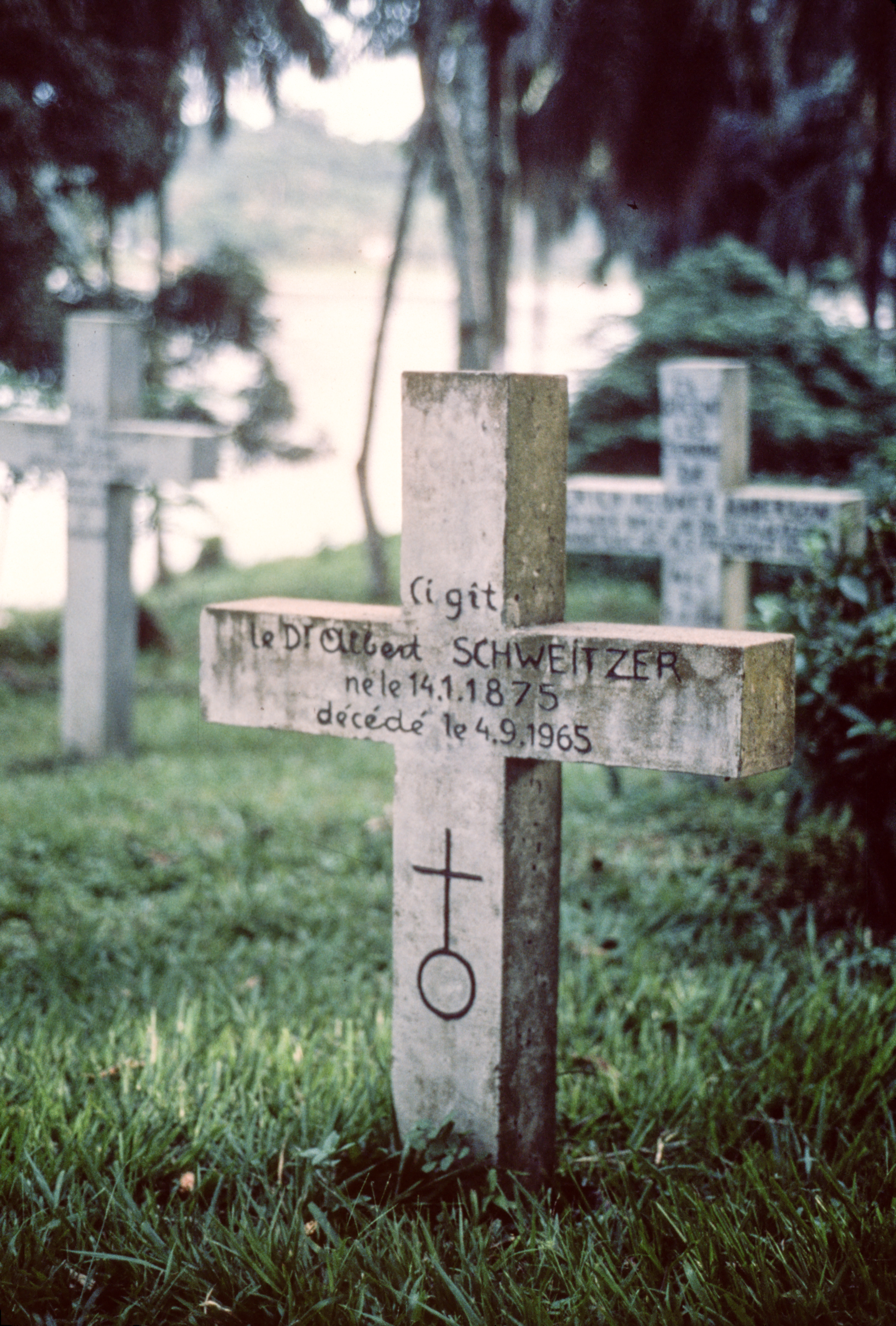
Schweitzer's grave in Lambaréné, marked by a cross he made himself

Schweitzer died on 4 September 1965 at his beloved hospital in Lambaréné, now in independent Gabon. His grave, on the banks of the Ogooué River, is marked by a cross he made himself.

His cousin Anne-Marie Schweitzer Sartre was the mother of Jean-Paul Sartre. Her father, Charles Schweitzer, was the older brother of Albert Schweitzer's father, Louis Théophile.

Schweitzer is often cited in vegetarian literature as being an advocate of vegetarianism in his later years. Schweitzer was not a vegetarian in his earlier life. For example, in 1950, biographer Magnus C. Ratter commented that Schweitzer never "commit[ted] himself to the anti-vivisection, vegetarian, or pacifist positions, though his thought leads in this direction". Biographer James Bentley has written that Schweitzer became a vegetarian after his wife's death in 1957 and he was "living almost entirely on lentil soup". In contrast to this, historian David N. Stamos has written that Schweitzer was not a vegetarian in his personal life nor imposed it on his missionary hospital, but he did help animals and was opposed to hunting. Stamos noted that Schweitzer held the view that evolution ingrained humans with an instinct for meat, so it was useless in trying to deny it.

The Albert Schweitzer Fellowship was founded in 1940 by Schweitzer to unite US supporters in filling the gap in support for his Hospital when his European supply lines were cut off by war, and continues to support the Lambaréné Hospital today. Schweitzer considered his ethic of Reverence for Life, not his hospital, his most important legacy, saying that his Lambaréné Hospital was just "my own improvisation on the theme of Reverence for Life. Everyone can have their own Lambaréné".

Today, the ASF helps large numbers of young Americans in health-related professional fields find or create "their own Lambaréné" in the US or internationally. ASF selects and supports nearly 250 new US and Africa Schweitzer Fellows each year from over 100 of the leading US schools of medicine, nursing, public health, and every other field with some relation to health, including music, law, and divinity. The peer-supporting lifelong network of "Schweitzer Fellows for Life" numbered over 2,000 members in 2008, and is growing by nearly 1,000 every four years. Nearly 150 of these Schweitzer Fellows have served at the Hospital in Lambaréné, for three-month periods during their last year of medical school.

Schweitzer eponyms

Schweitzer's writings and life are often quoted, resulting in a number of eponyms, such as the 'Schweitzer technique' (discussed below), and the 'Schweitzer effect'. The 'Schweitzer effect' refers to his statement that 'Example is not the main thing in influencing others; it is the only thing'. This eponym is used in medical education to highlight the relationship between lived experience/example and medical students' opinions on professional behaviours.

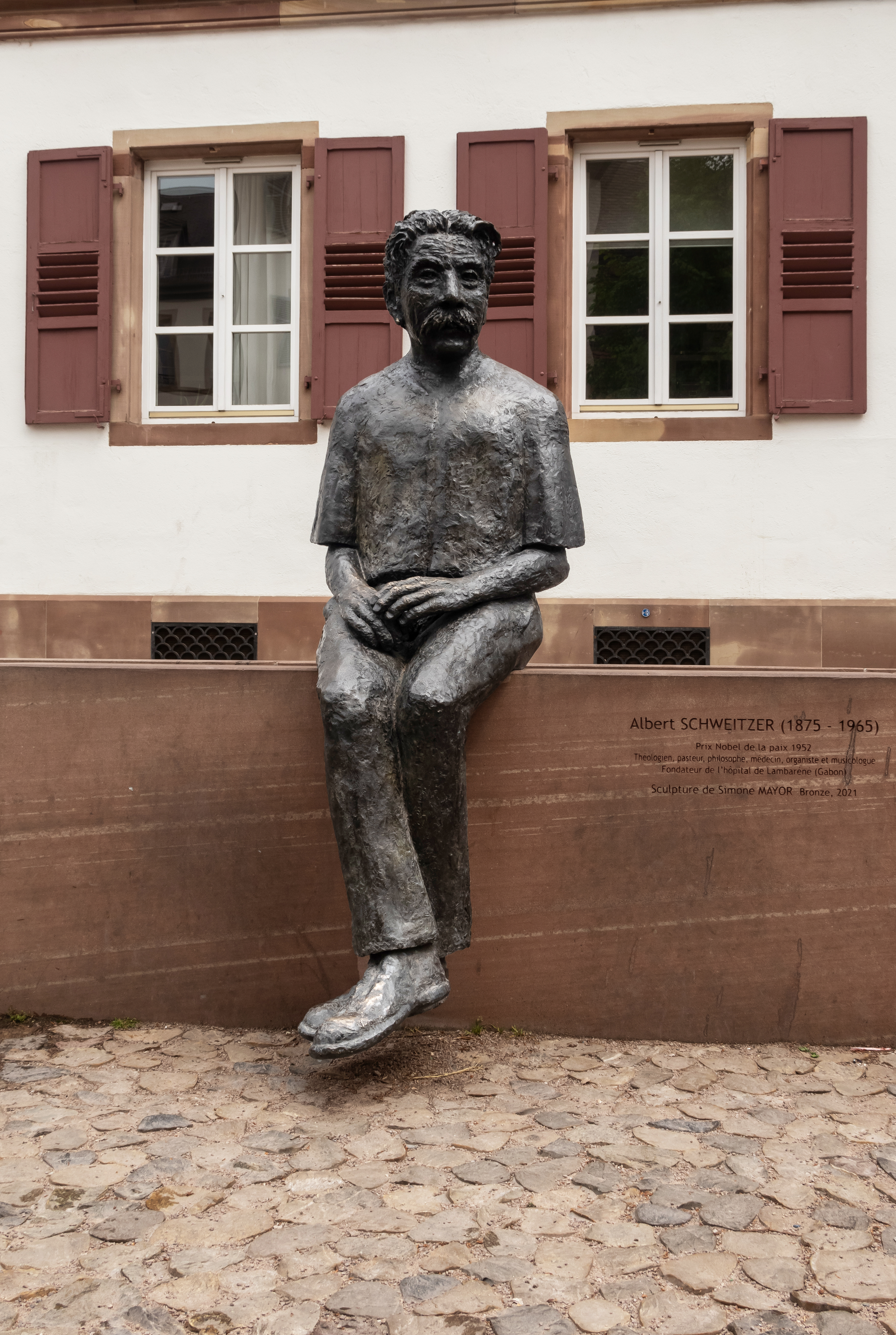
A statue of Albert Schweitzer in Strasbourg

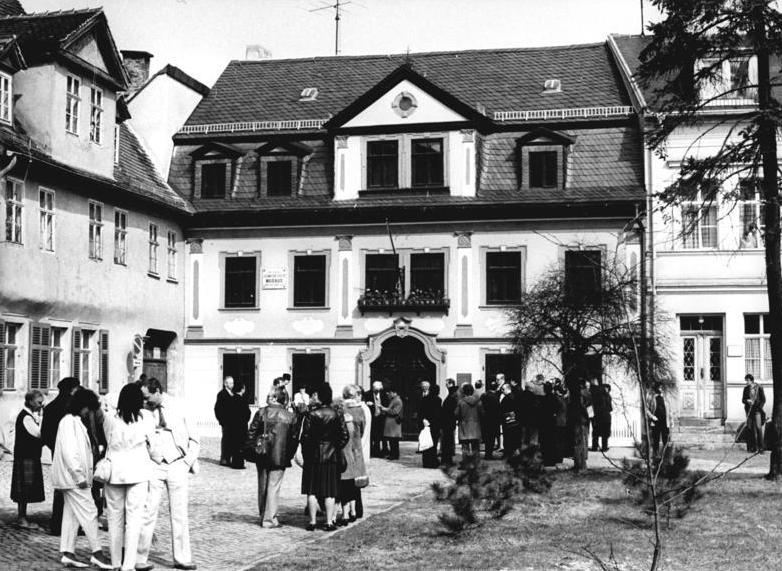
The Albert Schweitzer Memorial and Museum in Weimar, 1984

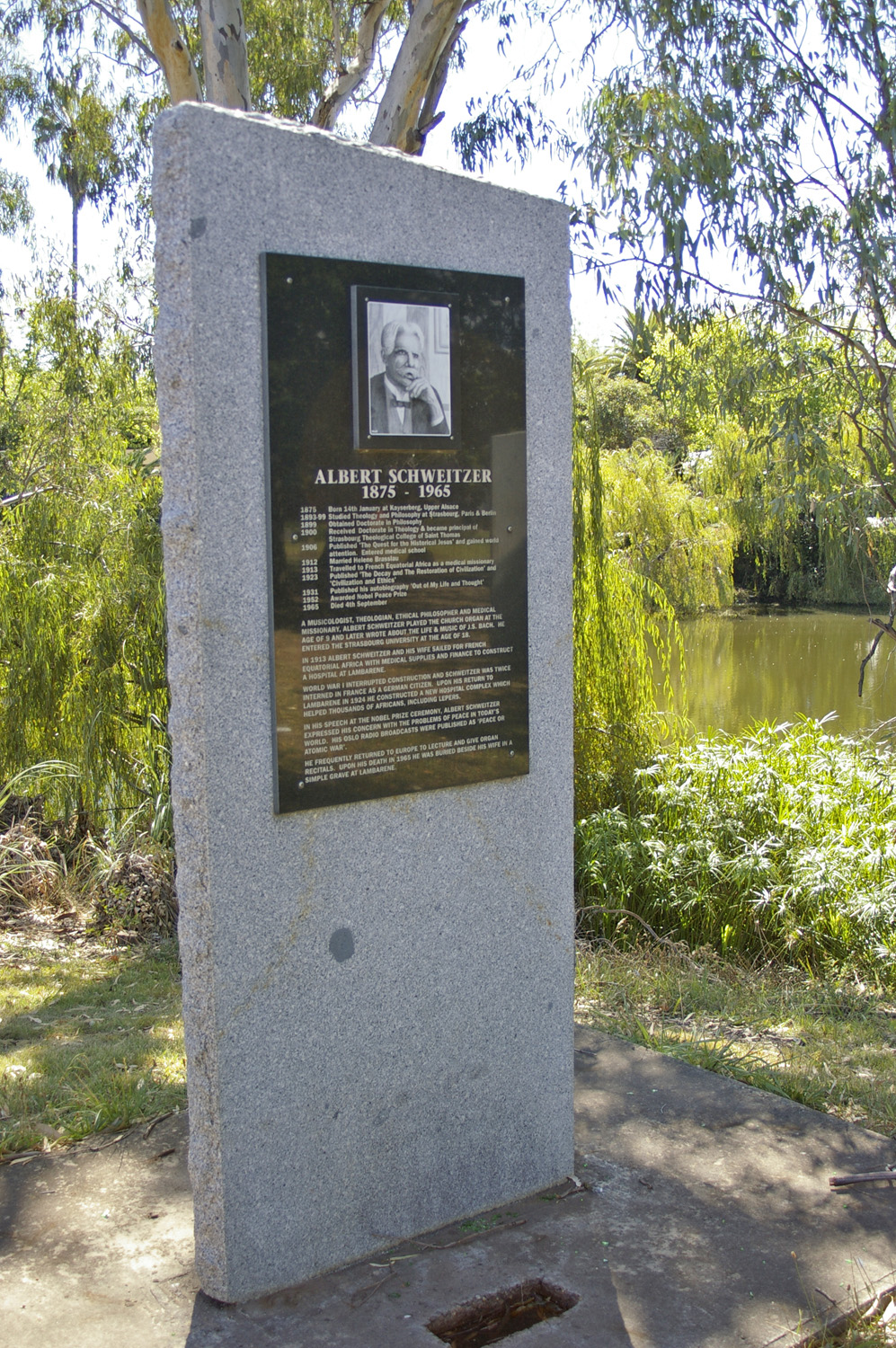
An Albert Schweitzer Monument in Wagga Wagga, Australia

== Legacy ==
- The International Albert Schweitzer Prize was first awarded on 29 May 2011 to Eugen Drewermann and the physician couple Rolf and Raphaela Maibach in Königsfeld im Schwarzwald, where Schweitzer's former residence now houses the Albert Schweitzer Museum.
- The Schweitzer Institute based in Cambridge and affiliated with Peterhouse, the university's oldest college is an academic think tank founded in 2004.
- The Albert Schweitzer Institute is a Quinnipiac University campus organization that conducts local, national and international programs that link education, ethics, and voluntarism, and also sponsors speakers and other academic events on campus, and connects students with opportunities in the local and global communities in areas of sustainability, peace, human rights, and humanitarian service. The institute also houses The Albert Schweitzer Museum and offers The Albert Schweitzer Faculty Fellowship.
- The Albert Schweitzer Collections at Quinnipiac University's Arnold Bernhard Library comprise books, documents, and artifacts related to the life and legacy of Schweitzer
- The Albert Schweitzer Organ Festival (est. 1979) in the Netherlands
- Albert Schweitzer Organ Festival Hartford at Trinity College (Connecticut) in the US
- The Schweitzer Foundation UK is a charity registered in 2019 in the UK

== Sound recordings ==
Recordings of Schweitzer playing the music of Bach are available on CD. In 1934 and 1935 he resided in Britain, delivering the Gifford Lectures at Edinburgh University, and those on Religion in Modern Civilization at Oxford and London. He had originally conducted trials for recordings for His Master's Voice on the organ of the old Queen's Hall in London. These records did not satisfy him, the instrument being too harsh.

In mid-December 1935, he began to record for Columbia Records on the organ of All Hallows, Barking-by-the-Tower, London. At his suggestion the sessions were transferred to the church of Ste Aurélie in Strasbourg, on a mid-18th-century organ by Johann Andreas Silbermann (brother of Gottfried), an organ-builder greatly revered by Bach, which had been restored by the Lorraine organ-builder Frédéric Härpfer shortly before the First World War. These recordings were made in the course of a fortnight in October 1936.

=== Schweitzer technique ===
Schweitzer developed a technique for recording the performances of Bach's music; or perhaps engineers developed it to record his performances. Known as the "Schweitzer technique", it is a slight improvement on what is commonly known as mid-side. The mid-side sees a figure-8 microphone pointed off-axis, perpendicular to the sound source. Then a single cardioid microphone is placed on axis, bisecting the figure-8 pattern. The signal from the figure-8 is muted, panned hard left and right, one of the signals being flipped out of polarity.

In the Schweitzer method, the figure-8 is replaced by two small diaphragm condenser microphones pointed directly away from each other. The information that each capsule collects is unique, unlike the identical out-of-polarity information generated from the figure-8 in a regular mid-side. The on-axis microphone is often a large diaphragm condenser. The technique has since been used to record many modern instruments.

=== Columbia recordings ===
Altogether his early Columbia discs included 25 records of Bach and eight of César Franck. The Bach titles were mainly distributed as follows:

- Queen's Hall: Organ Prelude and Fugue in E minor (Edition Peters (Note: Schweitzer's Bach recordings are usually identified with reference to the Peters Edition of the Organ-works in 9 volumes, edited by Friedrich Konrad Griepenkerl and Ferdinand August Roitzsch, in the form revised by Hermann Keller.) Vol 3, 10); Herzlich thut mich verlangen (BWV 727); Wenn wir in höchsten Nöten sein (Vol 7, 58 (Leipzig 18)).
- All Hallows: Prelude and Fugue in C major; Fantasia and Fugue in G minor (the Great); Prelude and Fugue in G major; Prelude and Fugue in F minor; Little Fugue in G minor; Toccata and Fugue in D minor.
- Ste Aurélie: Prelude and Fugue in C minor; Prelude and Fugue in E minor; Toccata and Fugue in D minor. Chorale Preludes: Schmücke dich, O liebe Seele (Peters Vol 7, 49 (Leipzig 4)); O Mensch, bewein dein Sünde groß (Vol 5, 45); O Lamm Gottes, unschuldig (Vol 7, 48 (Leipzig 6)); Christus, der uns selig macht (Vol 5, 8); Da Jesus an dem Kreuze stand (Vol 5, 9); An Wasserflüssen Babylon (Vol 6, 12b); Christum wir wollen loben schon (Vol 5, 6); Liebster Jesu, wir sind hier (Vol 5, app 5); Mit Fried und Freud ich fahr dahin (Vol 5, 4); Sei gegrüßet, Jesu gütig (Var 11, Vol 5, app. 3); Jesus Christus, unser Heiland (Vol 6, 31 (Leipzig 15)); Christ lag in Todesbanden (Vol 5, 5); Erschienen ist der herrlich Tag (Vol 5, 15).

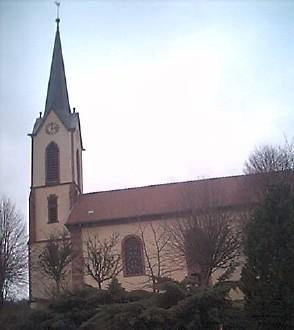
Gunsbach parish church, where the later recordings were made

Later recordings were made at Parish church, Günsbach: These recordings were made by C. Robert Fine during the time Dr. Schweitzer was being filmed in Günsbach for the documentary "Albert Schweitzer". Fine originally self-released the recordings but later licensed the masters to Columbia.

- Fugue in A minor (Peters, Vol 2, 8); Fantasia and Fugue in G minor (Great) (Vol 2, 4); Toccata, Adagio and Fugue in C major (Vol 3, 8).
- Prelude in C major (Vol 4, 1); Prelude in D major (Vol 4, 3); Canzona in D minor (Vol 4, 10) (with Mendelssohn, Sonata in D minor op 65.6).
- Chorale-Preludes: O Mensch, bewein dein Sünde groß (1st and 2nd versions, Peters Vol 5, 45); Wenn wir in höchsten Nöten sein (Vor deinen Thron tret ich hiermit) (vol 7, 58 (Leipzig 18)); Ich ruf zu dir, Herr Jesu Christ (Vol 5, 30); Gelobet seist du, Jesu Christ (Vol 5, 17); Herzlich tut mich verlangen (Vol 5, 27); Nun komm, der Heiden Heiland (vol 7, 45 (BWV 659a)).

The above were released in the United States as Columbia Masterworks boxed set SL-175.

=== Philips recordings ===
- J. S. Bach: Prelude and Fugue in A major, BWV 536; Prelude and Fugue in F minor, BWV 534; Prelude and Fugue in B minor, BWV 544; Toccata and Fugue in D minor, BWV 538.
- J. S. Bach: Passacaglia in C minor, BWV 582; Prelude and Fugue in E minor, BWV 533; Prelude and Fugue in A minor, BWV 543; Prelude and Fugue in G major, BWV 541; Toccata and Fugue in D minor, BWV 565.
- César Franck: Organ Chorales, no. 1 in E major; no. 2 in B minor; no. 3 in A minor.

== Portrayals and dedication ==
Dramatisations of Schweitzer's life include:

- The 1952 biographical film Il est minuit, Docteur Schweitzer, with Pierre Fresnay as Schweitzer.
- The 1957 biographical film Albert Schweitzer in which Schweitzer appears as himself and Phillip Eckert portrays him.
- The 1962 TV remake of Il est minuit, Docteur Schweitzer, with Jean-Pierre Marielle as Schweitzer.
- The 1990 biographical film The Light in the Jungle, with Malcolm McDowell as Schweitzer.
- Two 1992 episodes of the George Lucas television series The Young Indiana Jones Chronicles ("German East Africa, December 1916" and "Congo, January 1917"), with Friedrich von Thun as Schweitzer. The episodes were later combined to create Oganga, Giver and Taker of Life.
- The 1995 biographical film Le Grand blanc de Lambaréné, with André Wilms as Schweitzer.
- The 2006 TV biographical film Albert Schweitzer: Called to Africa, with Jeff McCarthy as Schweitzer.
- The 2009 biographical film Albert Schweitzer, with Jeroen Krabbé as Schweitzer.

The Greek author Nikos Kazantzakis dedicated his novel The Poor Man of Assisi to him.

== Bibliography ==
- — (2001) [German, 1906. English edition, A. & C. Black, London 1910, 1911], The Quest of the Historical Jesus; A Critical Study of Its Progress From Reimarus To Wrede, translated by Montgomery, William, Augsburg Fortress Publishers, ISBN 978-0-8006-3288-5
- — (1905), J. S. Bach, Le Musicien-Poète [JS Bach, the Poet Musician] (in French), introduction by C. M. Widor, Leipzig: Breitkopf & Härtel with P. Costellot
- — (1908), J. S. Bach (in German) (enlarged ed.), Leipzig: Breitkopf & Härtel. English translation by Ernest Newman, with author's alterations and additions, London 1911. Fulltext scans (English): Vol. 1, Vol. 2.
- — (1906). Deutsche und französische Orgelbaukunst und Orgelkunst [German and French organbuilding and organ art] (in German). Leipzig: Breitkopf & Härtel. (first printed in Musik, vols 13 and 14 (5th year)).
- — (1975) [1911]. The Psychiatric Study of Jesus: Exposition and Criticism. Gloucester, Massachusetts: Peter Smith Publisher. ISBN 978-0-8446-2894-3.
- — (1912). Paul and His Interpreters, A Critical History. Translated by Montgomery, W. London: Adam & Charles Black.
- — (1985) [1914]. The Mystery of the Kingdom of God: The Secret of Jesus' Messiahship and Passion. Prometheus Books. ISBN 978-0-87975-294-1.
- — (1924) [1922]. On the Edge of the Primeval Forest. Translated by Campion, Ch. Th. (reprint ed.). London: A. & C. Black. (translation of Zwischen Wasser und Urwald, 1921)
- The Decay and the Restoration of Civilization and Civilization and Ethics (The Philosophy of Civilization, Vols I & II of the projected but not completed four-volume work), A. & C. Black, London 1923. Material from these volumes is rearranged in a modern compilation, The Philosophy of Civilization (Prometheus Books, 1987), ISBN 0-87975-403-6
- — (1998) [1930, 1931], The Mysticism of Paul the Apostle, Johns Hopkins University Press, ISBN 978-0-8018-6098-0
- — (1931). Aus Meinem Leben und Denken. Leipzig: Felix Meiner Verlag. translated as — (1933). Out of My Life and Thought: An Autobiography. Henry Holt and Company.; — (1998). Out of My Life and Thought: An Autobiography. Johns Hopkins University Press. ISBN 978-0-8018-6097-3.
- — (1935). Indian Thought and Its Development. Boston, Massachusetts: Beacon Press. OCLC 8003381.
- Afrikanische Geschichten (Felix Meiner, Leipzig and Hamburg 1938): tr. Mrs C. E. B. Russell as From My African Notebook (George Allen and Unwin, London 1938/Henry Holt, New York 1939). Modern edition with foreword by L. Forrow (Syracuse University Press, 2002).
- — (4 November 1954). "The Problem of Peace". The Nobel Foundation.
- — (1958). Peace or Atomic War?. New York: Henry Holt.
- — (1968). Neuenschwander, Ulrich [in German] (ed.). The Kingdom of God and Primitive Christianity. New York: Seabury Press. OCLC 321874.
- — (2005). Brabazon, James (ed.). Albert Schweitzer: Essential Writings. Maryknoll, New York: Orbis Books. ISBN 978-1-57075-602-3.

== Honours and awards ==
- Médaille de la Société d'encouragement au progrès
- Grand-Officier of the Order of Legion of Honour
- Prince Carl Medal

== See also ==
- List of peace activists
- Cultural depictions of Albert Schweitzer
- Helene Bresslau Schweitzer
- J. Howard Moore
