= Ernst Bresslau =

German zoologist

- Born: Ernst Ludwig Breßlau; 10 July 1877; Berlin
- Died: 9 May 1935 (aged 57); São Paulo
- Education: University of Strasbourg
- Scientific career
- Fields: Zoology, Helminthology
- Workplaces: University of Cologne, University of São Paulo
- Author abbrev. (zoology): Bresslau

Ernst Ludwig Bresslau (10 July 1877, Berlin – 9 May 1935, São Paulo) was a German zoologist. He was the son of historian Harry Bresslau.

== Life ==
Ernst Ludwig Bresslau was born in 1877 in Berlin, Germany. His father, Harry Bresslau, was a professor of Medieval History at the University of Berlin. In 1890, the family moved to Strasbourg, and Ernst Bresslau started his studies in medicine and natural sciences in the University of Strasbourg.

In 1902, he obtained his PhD from the University of Strasbourg, and in 1904 he traveled to Brazil for the first time as a naval doctor. In 1913–14, he returned to Brazil and conducted zoological research in central and north-eastern regions of the country, later being named director of zoology at the Georg-Speyer-Haus in Frankfurt am Main (1919). From 1925 to 1933, he was a professor at the University of Cologne, where he was instrumental in the founding of its institute of zoology. In 1934 he returned to Brazil as director of the zoological institute at the University of São Paulo.

His primary areas of research involved the evolutionary development of flatworms, investigations of infusoria and the development of mammary organs in marsupials. His name is associated with Bachia bresslaui, sometimes referred to as "Bresslau's bachia", a species of Brazilian lizard described by Afrânio Pompílio Gastos do Amaral in 1935.

== Selected works ==
- Beiträge zur Entwicklungsgeschichte der Mammarorgane bei den Beutelthieren, 1901 - Contributions to the developmental history of mammary organs in marsupials.
- Eine neue Art der marinen Turbellariengattung Polycystis (Macrorhynchus) aus dem Süsswasser, 1906 - A new species of marine Turbellarian genus Polycystis found in freshwater.
- Zoologisches Wörterbuch : Erklärung der zoologischen Fachausdrücke. Zum Gebrauch beim Studium zoologischer anatomischer, entwicklungsgeschichtlicher und naturphilosophischer Werke, written by E. Bresslau and HE Ziegler; Composed by J. Eichler, E. Fraas ... , Revised and edited by Prof. Dr. HE Ziegler, ... / Second increased and improved edition / Jena: G. Fischer, 1911-1912. - Zoological dictionary; declaration of zoological terminology. For use in the study of zoological anatomy, development-historical and natural philosophical works.
- Die Entwickelung des Mammarapparates der Monotremen, Marsupialier und einiger Placentalier, 1912 - The development of mammary apparati of monotremes, marsupials and some placental animals.
- Methoden der Süßwaßerbiologie, 1936 - Methods of freshwater biology.
