= Lambaréné =

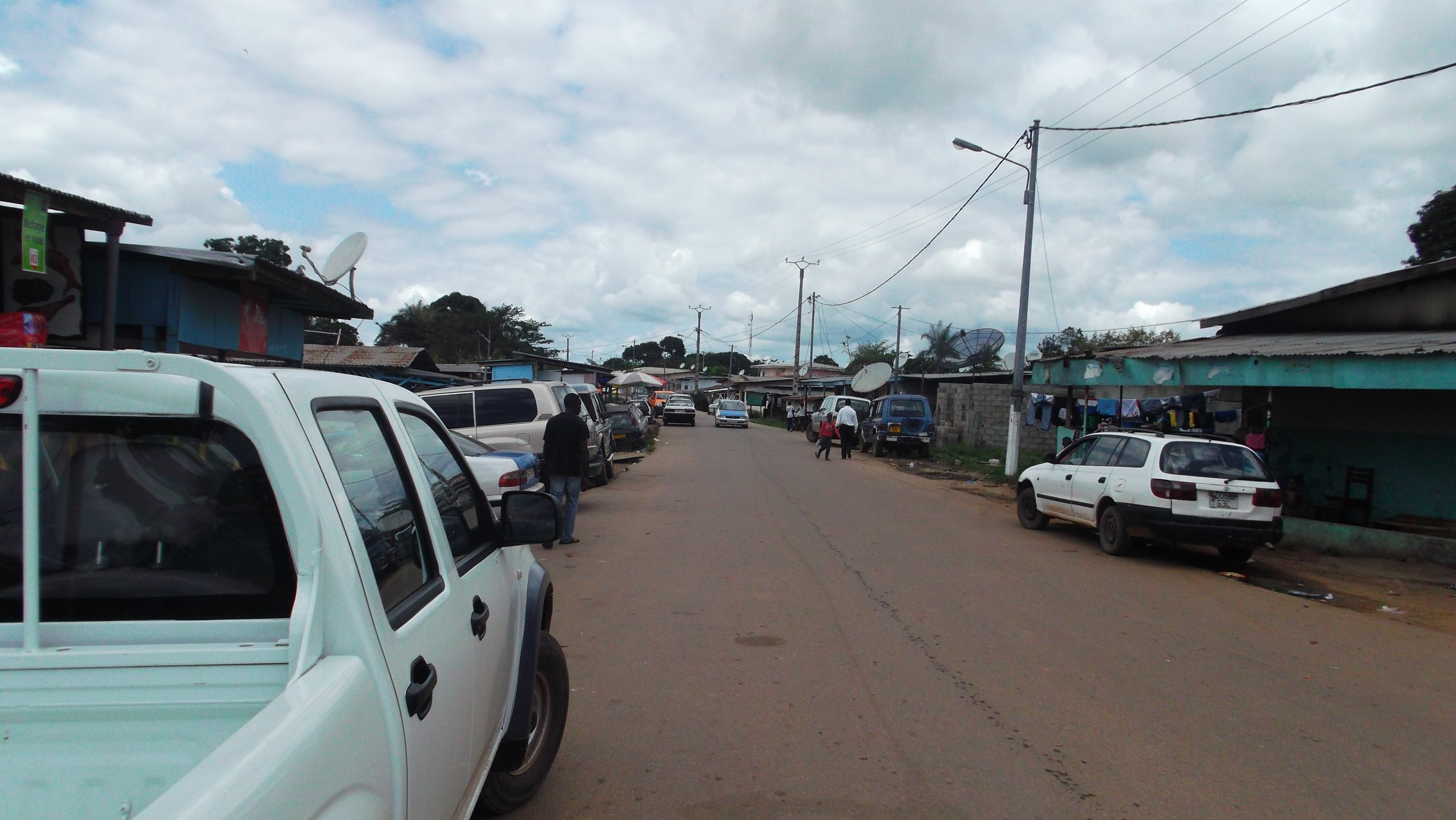
- Street in Lambaréné

- Coat of arms

- Location in Gabon
- Coordinates: 0°41′18″S 10°13′55″E
- Country: Gabon
- Province: Moyen-Ogooué

Population (2013 census)
  - Total: 38,775

Lambaréné is a town and the capital of Moyen-Ogooué in Gabon. It has a population of 38,775 as of 2013, and is located 75 kilometres south of the equator.

Lambaréné is based in the Central African Rainforest at the river Ogooué. This river divides the city into 3 districts: Rive Gauche, Ile Lambaréné and Rive Droite. The Albert Schweitzer Hospital and the districts Adouma and Abongo are located on Rive Droite. The districts Atongowanga, Sahoty, Dakar, Grand Village, Château, Lalala and Bordamur build the Ile Lambaréné. The majority of the people in Lambaréné live in the district Isaac located on Rive Gauche. This district hosts the Lambaréné Airport.

Today Lambaréné is inhabited mainly by Bantu ethnic groups such as the Fang, Bapounou, Eshira, and Myéné; these displaced the Pygmies to the east and north of Gabon. The main economic activity in the town is the fishery and a new port is under construction.

== Albert Schweitzer hospital ==
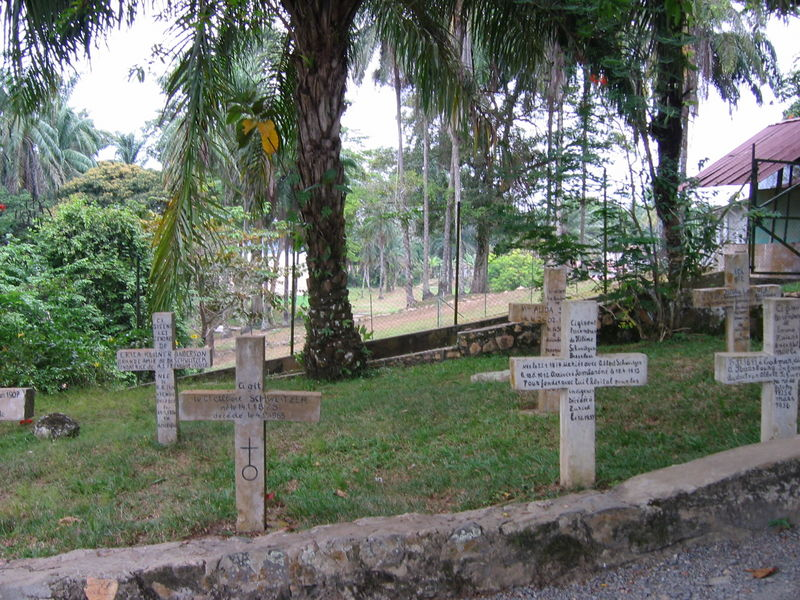
Grave of Albert Schweitzer at the hospital

The Franco-German Nobel Peace Prize winner Albert Schweitzer (1875–1965) founded his hospital in Lambaréné in 1913. Today, the Hôpital Albert Schweitzer comprises departments of Internal Medicine, Surgery, Paediatrics, a maternity clinic, a dentistry clinic and since 1981 a Medical Research Unit, which focuses on malaria research.

== Climate ==
Lambaréné has a tropical savanna climate (Köppen climate classification Aw). The average temperature at Lambaréné is 27 °C. The rainy season starts in October and ends in June (including a short dry season in December/January). The long dry season is from July to September.

Climate data for Lambarene (1961–1990)
Month	Jan	Feb	Mar	Apr	May	Jun	Jul	Aug	Sep	Oct	Nov	Dec	Year
Mean daily maximum °C (°F)	31.5 (88.7)	32.2 (90.0)	32.3 (90.1)	32.5 (90.5)	31.3 (88.3)	28.9 (84.0)	27.9 (82.2)	28.4 (83.1)	30.0 (86.0)	31.0 (87.8)	30.8 (87.4)	30.9 (87.6)	30.6 (87.1)
Daily mean °C (°F)	27.2 (81.0)	27.6 (81.7)	27.6 (81.7)	27.8 (82.0)	27.2 (81.0)	25.3 (77.5)	23.9 (75.0)	24.7 (76.5)	26.1 (79.0)	26.9 (80.4)	26.9 (80.4)	27.1 (80.8)	26.5 (79.7)
Mean daily minimum °C (°F)	22.9 (73.2)	22.9 (73.2)	22.8 (73.0)	23.1 (73.6)	23.1 (73.6)	21.7 (71.1)	19.9 (67.8)	20.9 (69.6)	22.2 (72.0)	22.8 (73.0)	23.0 (73.4)	23.2 (73.8)	22.4 (72.3)
Average precipitation mm (inches)	175.3 (6.90)	145.2 (5.72)	253.8 (9.99)	212.8 (8.38)	162.2 (6.39)	20.9 (0.82)	3.2 (0.13)	6.9 (0.27)	71.0 (2.80)	347.7 (13.69)	393.9 (15.51)	172.0 (6.77)	1,968.9 (77.52)
Average precipitation days	12.1	10.7	15.0	14.1	13.8	2.9	2.1	5.1	9.6	21.9	20.8	12.5	140.6
Average relative humidity (%)	83	81	81	81	83	84	82	81	80	81	83	84	82
Mean monthly sunshine hours	142.9	145.2	145.1	143.1	123.9	74.2	70.6	53.4	55.9	70.9	117.1	129.4	1,271.7
Source: NOAA

== Notable residents ==
- Albert Schweitzer, theologian, polymath, musician and music scholar, and physician, founded and supervised the Hôpital Albert Schweitzer in Lambaréné in 1913.
- Pierre Savorgnan de Brazza, Italo-French explorer and later colonial governor of French Equatorial Africa, resided at Lambaréné on several occasions.
- Rose Francine Rogombé, Interim President following the death of Omar Bongo, was born in Lambaréné.
- André Raponda Walker, the anthropologist and priest, worked nearby.

== Bibliography ==
- Maria Petringa, Brazza, A Life for Africa. Bloomington, IN: AuthorHouse, 2006. ISBN 978-1-4259-1198-0
