= Monléon-Magnoac =

- Commune
- Location of Monléon-Magnoac
- Location within France Location within Occitanie
- Coordinates: 43°15′07″N 0°31′09″E
- Country: France
- Region: Occitania
- Department: Hautes-Pyrénées
- Arrondissement: Tarbes
- Canton: Les Coteaux

Government
  - Mayor (2020–2026): Gérard Barthe
- Area^{1}: 19.66 km^{2} (7.59 sq mi)
- Elevation: 395 m (1,296 ft)
- Highest elevation: 507 m (1,663 ft)
- Lowest elevation: 295 m (968 ft)
- Population (2023): 405
  - Density: 20.6/km^{2} (53.4/sq mi)
- Time zone: UTC+01:00 (CET)
  - Summer (DST): UTC+02:00 (CEST)
- INSEE/Postal code: 65315 /65670
- ^{1} French Land Register data, which excludes lakes, ponds, glaciers > 1 km^{2} (0.386 sq mi or 247 acres) and river estuaries.

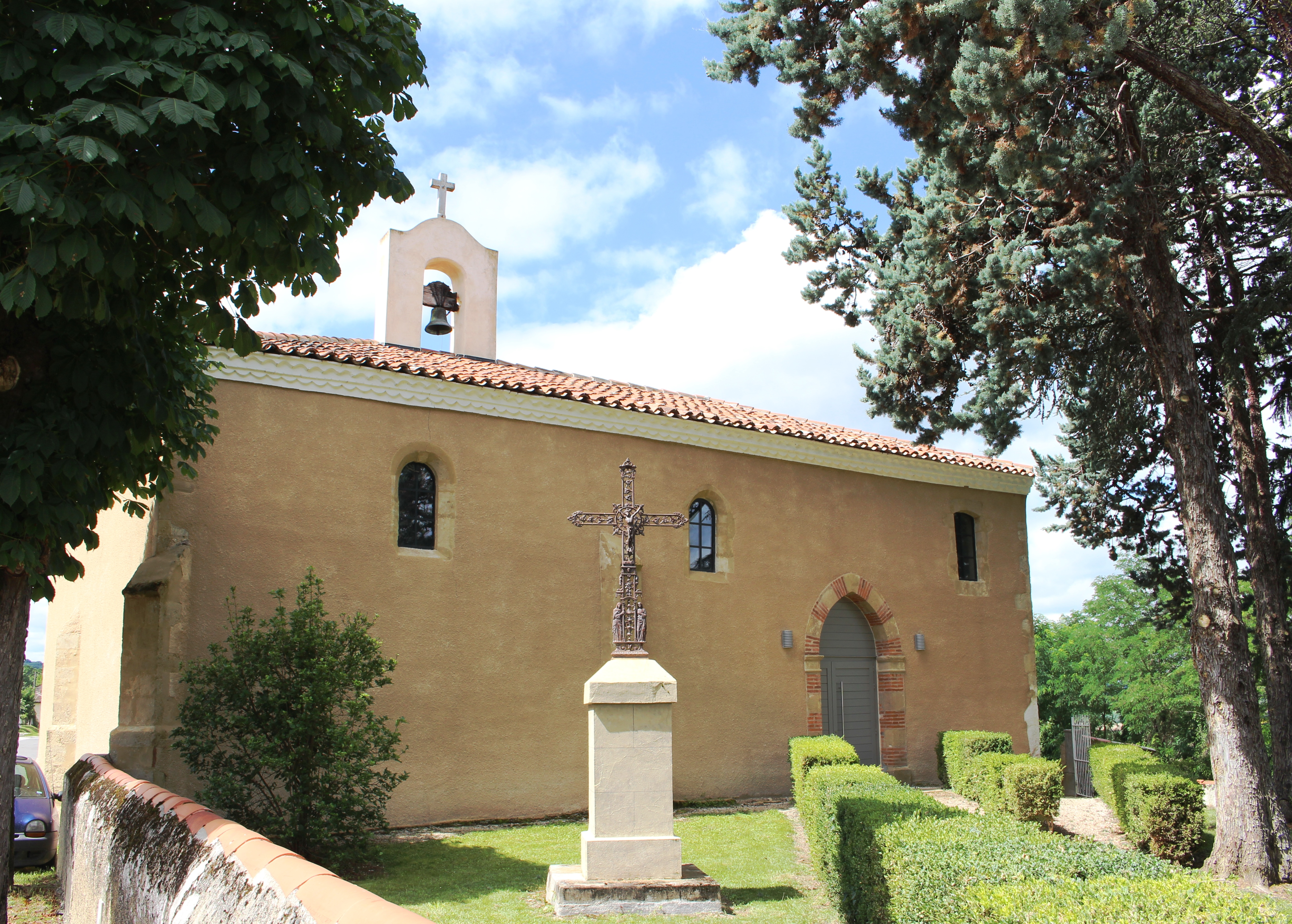
Chapelle des Pénitents de Monléon-Magnoac (Hautes-Pyrénées)

Monléon-Magnoac (French pronunciation: [mɔ̃leɔ̃ maɲɔak]; Occitan: Montlion) is a commune in the Hautes-Pyrénées department in south-western France. It had 419 inhabitants in 2019.

== See also ==
- Communes of the Hautes-Pyrénées department
