= Hôpital Albert Schweitzer =

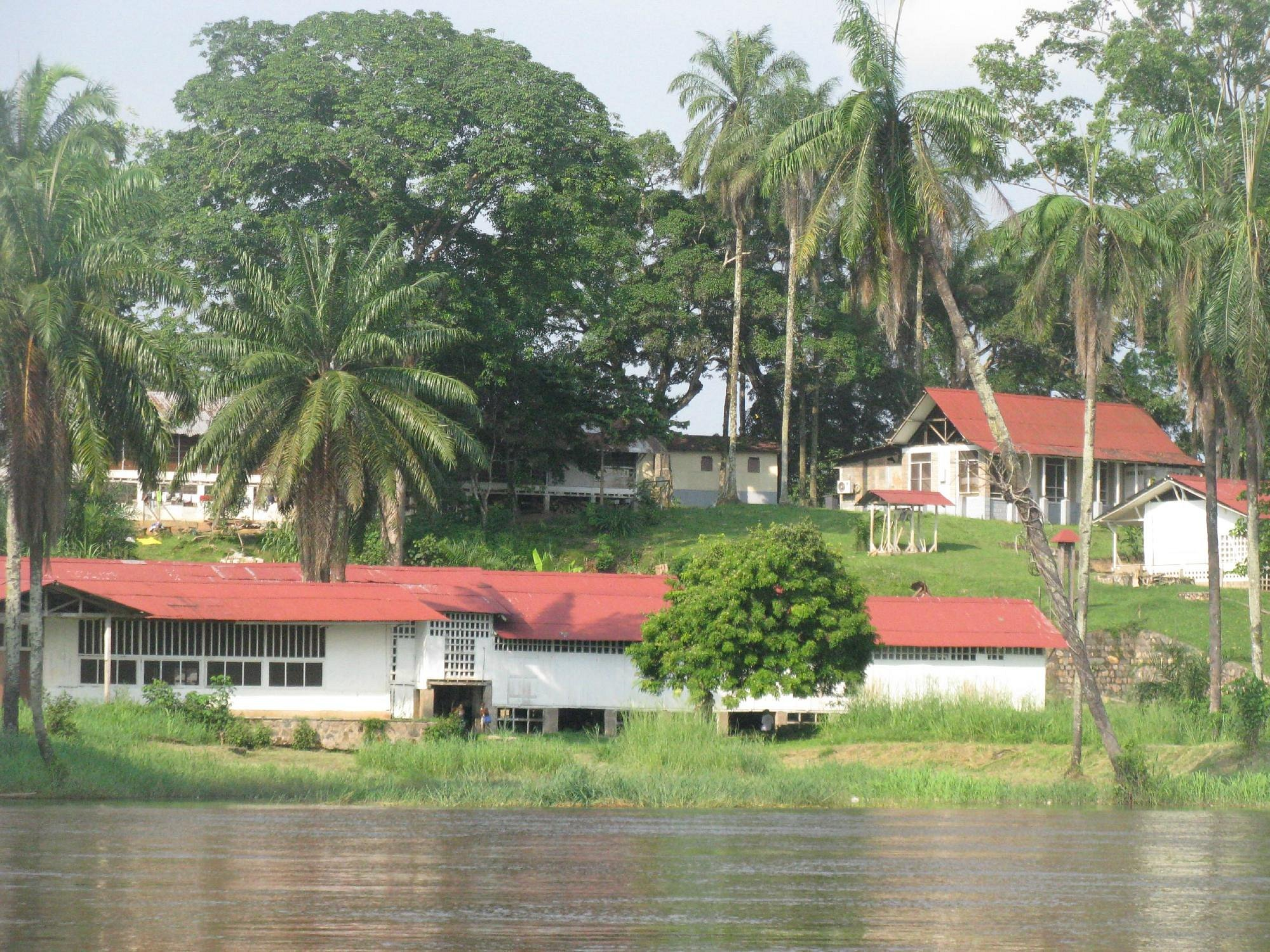

Geography
- Location: Lambaréné, Gabon
- Coordinates: 0.67930°S 10.22912°E

Organisation
- Type: Specialist

Services
- Beds: 150
- Specialty: Tropical diseases

History
- Founded: 1913

Links
- Lists: Hospitals in Gabon

The Hôpital Albert Schweitzer is a hospital that was established in 1913 by Albert Schweitzer and Helene Bresslau Schweitzer in Lambaréné, Gabon.

== History ==
Albert Schweitzer opened a hospital in 1913 in Lambaréné in what was then French Equatorial Africa that became Gabon, where he ran it until his death in 1965. He won the Nobel Prize in 1952 for his work there. Schweitzer used the prize money to build a leper colony. For most of its history, the hospital was operated, staffed, and funded by Europeans. Schweitzer worked with "fellowships" in many countries to fund his work (including the US Albert Schweitzer Fellowship, which was founded in 1940) and the fellowships were coordinated by the "Association Internationale de l'oeuvre du docteur Albert Schweitzer de Lambaréné" (AISL), which also oversaw the hospital. In 1974 the "Fondation internationale de l'Hôpital du docteur Albert Schweizer à Lambaréné" (FISL) was established and took over the duties of overseeing the hospital.

Since its founding, the hospital has been rebuilt twice, the second time being in 1981. At the time of the 1981 construction, a research facility was included at the request of the Gabon government, which eventually became a separate non-profit organization called "Centre de Recherches Médicale de Lambaréné" (CERMEL), but was still governed by the board of the FISL.

The staff and management of the hospital remained in European hands until around 2011, when for the first time an African doctor, Antoine Nziengui, was appointed to lead the hospital.

== Services ==
The hospital has been the primary source of healthcare for the surrounding region since it was founded in 1913. Periodic upgrades were made to the facility.

The U.S. National Institutes of Health has recognized the hospital's research laboratory as one of five leading facilities in Africa engaged in scientific studies of malaria. Children with severe malaria at the Schweitzer Hospital have the lowest documented mortality rate anywhere on the continent.

As of 2017, it had 150 beds, an emergency room, a pharmacy, a laboratory and an x-ray unit, about 160 staff, 2 surgeons, 2 interns and 2 pediatricians. Around 50,000 people used it each year. Diseases like HIV/AIDS and tuberculosis are also a major focus.

Schweitzer, his wife and several collaborators are buried nearby in a cemetery, among the old buildings which are a museum and have been submitted to the Tentative List to become a UNESCO World Heritage Site.

== See also ==
- Hôpital Albert Schweitzer Haiti
