= Languages of Nigeria =

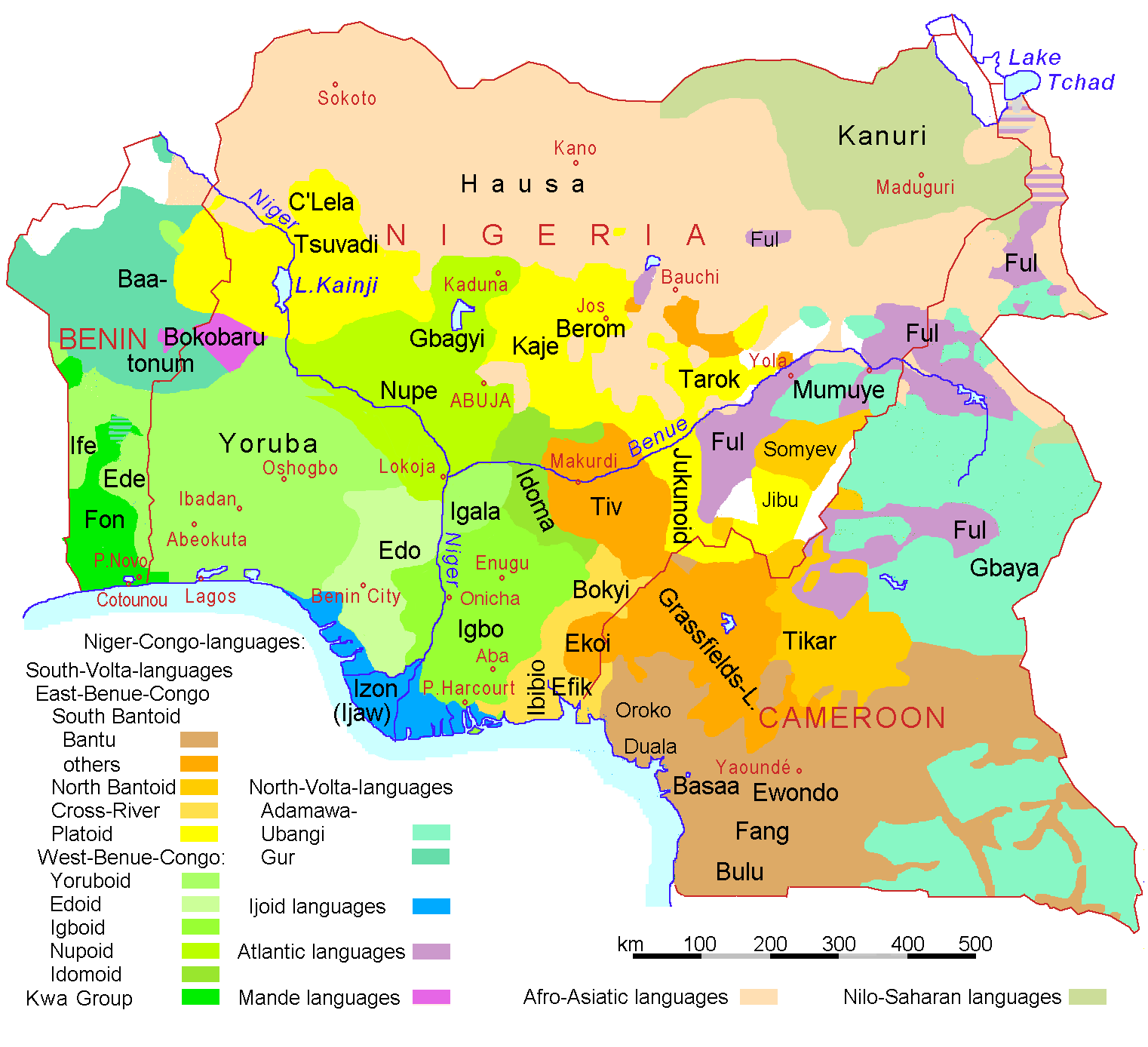
- A map of languages in Nigeria and neighbouring countries
- Official: English
- National: Nigerian Pidgin
- Regional: Hausa, Yoruba, Igbo, Fula, Ibibio, Kanuri, Mumuye, Tiv, Efik, Edo, Nupe
- Foreign: Arabic, French
- Signed: Nigerian Sign Language; Hausa Sign Language; Bura Sign Language
- Keyboard layout: QWERTY

There are over 520 native languages spoken in Nigeria. The two official languages are English (which was the language of Colonial Nigeria) and French (since 1996). The English-based creole Nigerian Pidgin – first used by the colonizing British and African slavers to facilitate the Atlantic slave trade in the late 17th century – has now become the most common lingua franca, spoken by over 60 million people.

The most commonly spoken native languages are Hausa (over 63 million when including second-language, or L2, speakers), Yoruba (over 47 million, including L2 speakers), Igbo (over 33 million, including L2 speakers), Fulfulde (18 million), Ibibio (over 10 million, including L2 speakers), Kanuri (7.6 million), Ijaw cluster (over 5 million), Tiv (4.5 million), and approximately 2 to 3 million each of Nupe, Gbagyi, Edo, Igala, Urhobo, Idoma, and Ogoni. Nigeria's linguistic diversity is a microcosm of much of Africa as a whole, and the country contains languages from the three major purported African language families: Afroasiatic, Nilo-Saharan and Niger-Congo. Nigeria also has several as-yet unclassified languages, such as Centúúm, which may represent a relic of an even greater diversity before the spread of the current language families.

== English and Pidgin ==
English is the single most widely spoken language in Nigeria, spoken by 60 million of the population. It is the main lingua franca of the country and there are a growing number of sole English speakers due to rapid urbanisation and globalisation. English remains the official language and is the major language of communication in government, business and education. Furthermore, the national anthem, constitution and pledge are written in English. Almost all mass media transmit information in English. English became the official language when Nigeria was created from diverse national groups by the British Empire. Despite decolonisation, Nigeria chose to make English the official language to promote national cultural unity and so not to favour any particular native language.

Despite its status, English is not widely spoken in rural areas. Many Nigerians struggle with English, evidenced by the 60 percent fail rate of the WASSCE in English (May/June 2015), an important exam certificate. Nevertheless, many Nigerians hold negative social attitudes towards the country's native languages, combining to lead to the neglect of Nigeria's many native languages. As such, there are fears from prominent linguists that Nigerian native languages are endangered and face eventual extinction.

Pidgin, first used by British and African slavers to facilitate the Atlantic slave trade in the late seventeenth century, has replaced the native language for many Nigerians. Many Nigerians speak Nigerian Pidgin, a creole language based on English, which is a popular social and cultural language. It has become popular in the mass media and in political slogans. According to a 2012 study, the replacement of native local languages with Pidgin is inevitable in the areas studied.

== French ==
French was made the second official language of Nigeria in December 1996, by president Sani Abacha, due to several political, economic and cultural reasons. Geographically speaking, Nigeria is surrounded by French-speaking countries; and as West Africa's most populated country and prime economy since the late-twentieth century, Nigeria and Nigerian authorities are sometimes identified as an informal representative of the whole sub-region in some international conferences and meetings.

As such, it was essential for Nigerian officials to be able to develop an understanding of the neighbouring countries and political cultures that they were aiming at "representing" in such events.

As an important official and financial language on the African continent and abroad, French is perceived as "an enhancer to economic growth through job creation…" by successive Nigerian governments and academics. Academically speaking, fluency in French can mean better access to scholarships, international study programs, access to foreign universities, higher education institutions, global institutions (ECOWAS, AU, EU, UN, NGOs, foreign civil law systems, foreign trading, etc.) and better job opportunities for Nigerians.

== Afroasiatic languages ==
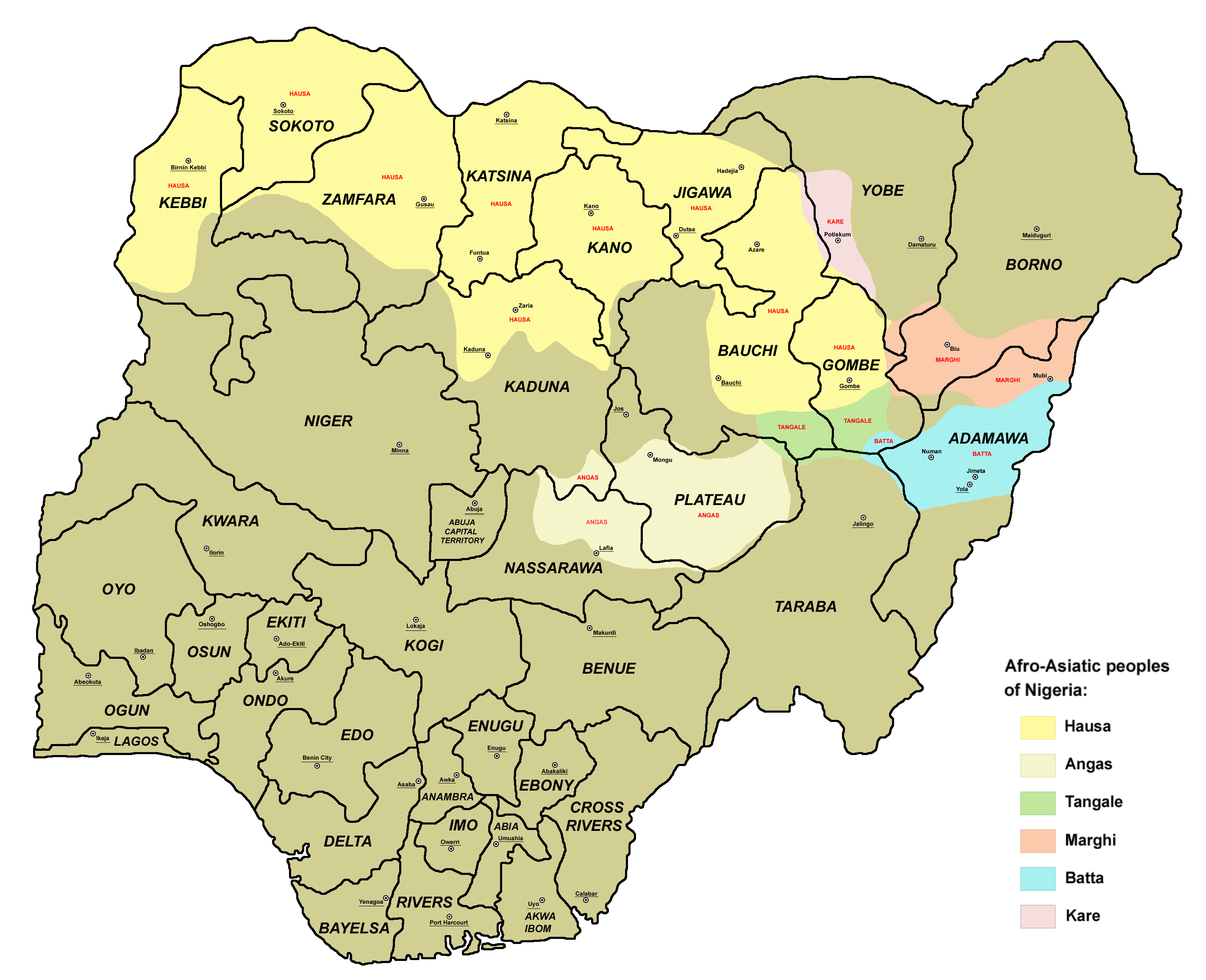
A map showing Afroasiatic speaking peoples in Nigeria

The Afroasiatic languages of Nigeria are divided into Chadic, Semitic and Berber. Among these categories, Chadic languages predominate, with more than 700 languages. Semitic is represented by various dialects of Arabic spoken in the Northeast and Berber by the Tuareg-speaking communities in the extreme Northwest.

The Hausa language is the best known Chadic language in Nigeria; though there is a paucity of statistics on native speakers in Nigeria, the language is spoken by 24 million people in West Africa and is the second language of 15 million more. Hausa has therefore emerged as lingua franca throughout much of West Africa, and the Sahel in particular. The language is spoken primarily amongst Northern Nigerians and is often associated with Islamic culture in Nigeria and West Africa on the whole.

Hausa is classified as a West Chadic language of the Chadic grouping, a major subfamily of Afroasiatic. Culturally, the Hausa people became closely integrated with the Fulani following the establishment of the Sokoto Caliphate by the Fulani Uthman dan Fodio in the 19th century. Hausa is the official language of several states in Northern Nigeria and the most important dialect is generally regarded as that spoken in Kano, an Eastern Hausa dialect, which is the standard variety used for official purposes.

Eastern dialects also include some dialects spoken in Zaria and Bauchi; Western Hausa dialects include Sakkwatanchi spoken in Sokoto, Katsinanchi in Katsina Arewanchi in both Gobir and Adar, Kebbi and Zamfara. Katsina is transitional between Eastern and Western dialects. Northern Hausa dialects include Arewa and Arawa, whilst Zaria is a prominent Southern version; Barikanchi is a pidgin formerly used in the military.

Hausa is a very atypical Chadic language, with a reduced tonal system and a phonology influenced by Arabic. Other well-known Chadic languages include Mupun, Ngas, Goemai, Mwaghavul, Bole, Ngizim, Bade and Bachama. In the East of Nigeria and on into Cameroon are the Central Chadic languages such as Bura, Kamwe and Margi. These are highly diverse and remain very poorly described. Many Chadic languages are severely threatened; recent searches by Bernard Caron for Southern Bauchi languages show that even some of those recorded in the 1970s have disappeared. However unknown Chadic languages are still being reported, such as the recent description of Dyarim.

Hausa, as well as other Afroasiatic languages such as, Kamwe, Margi, Karai-Karai and Bade (another West Chadic language spoken in northeastern Nigeria), have historically been written in a modified Arabic script known as ajami. However, the modern official orthography is now a romanisation known as boko introduced by the British regime in the 1930s.

== Niger–Congo languages ==
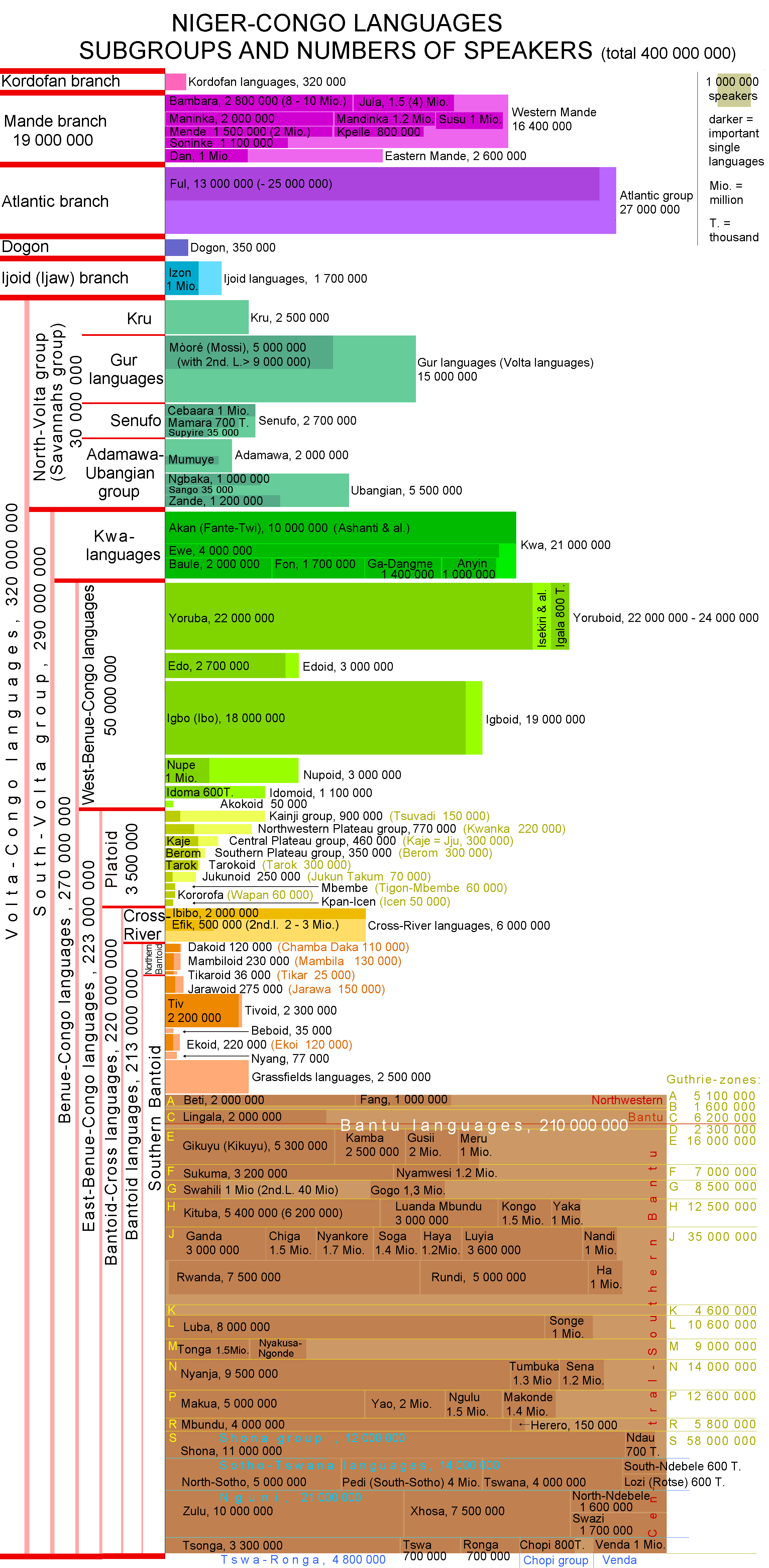
Systematic graphic of the Niger–Congo languages with numbers of speakers

Niger–Congo predominates in the Central, East and Southern areas of Nigeria; the main branches represented in Nigeria are Mande, Atlantic, Gur, Kwa, Benue–Congo and Adamawa–Ubangi. Mande is represented by the Busa cluster and Kyenga in the northwest. Fulfulde is the single Atlantic language, of Senegambian origin but now spoken by cattle pastoralists across the Sahel and largely in the northeastern states of Nigeria, especially Adamawa.

The Ijoid languages are spoken across the Niger Delta region and include Ịjọ (Ijaw), Kalabari, and the intriguing remnant language Defaka. The Ibibio language is spoken across the coastal southeastern part of Nigeria and includes the dialects Oron, Annang, and Efik proper. The single Gur language spoken is Baatọnun, in the extreme Northwest.

The Adamawa–Ubangian languages are spoken across a region spanning central Nigeria to the Central African Republic. In Nigeria, the westernmost languages of this group are the Tula-Waja languages. The Kwa languages are represented by the Gun group in the far southwest, which is related to the Gbe languages spoken in Benin and Togo.

The classification of the remaining languages is controversial; Joseph Greenberg classified those without noun-classes, such as Yoruba, Igbo, and Ibibio (Efik, Oron, and Annang), as 'Eastern Kwa' and those with classes as 'Benue–Congo'. This was reversed in an influential 1989 publication and reflected on the 1992 map of languages, where all these were considered Benue–Congo. Recent opinion, however, has been to revert to Greenberg's distinction. The literature must thus be read with care and due regard for the date. There are several small language groupings in the Niger Confluence area, notably Ukaan, Akpes, Ayere-Ahan and Ọkọ, whose inclusion in these groupings has never been satisfactorily argued.

Former Eastern Kwa, i.e. West Benue–Congo would then include Igboid, i.e. Igbo language proper, Ukwuani, Ikwerre, Ekpeye etc., Yoruboid, i.e. Yoruba, Itsekiri and Igala, Akokoid (eight small languages in Ondo, Edo and Kogi state), Edoid including Edo (sometimes referred to as) Bini in Edo State, Ibibio-Efik, Idomoid (Idoma) and Nupoid (Nupe) and perhaps include the other languages mentioned above. The Idoma language is classified in the Akweya subgroup of the Idomoid languages of the Volta–Niger family, which include Alago, Agatu, Etulo, Ufia and Yala languages of Benue, Nasarawa and Northern Cross River states.

East Benue–Congo includes Kainji, Plateau (46 languages, notably Gamai language), Jukunoid, Dakoid and some parts of Cross River. Apart from these, there are numerous Bantoid languages, which are the languages immediately ancestral to Bantu. These include Mambiloid, Ekoid of Cross River State, Bendi, Beboid, Grassfields and Tivoid languages.

Within the Benue-Congo languages, the expansive Bantu language family which covers much of central and southern Africa is represented in Nigeria by; Jarawa with around a quarter million speakers, making it the most spoken Bantu language in the country. Others include Mbula-Bwazza (100,000), Kulung (40,000), Labir (13,000), Bile and a few others.

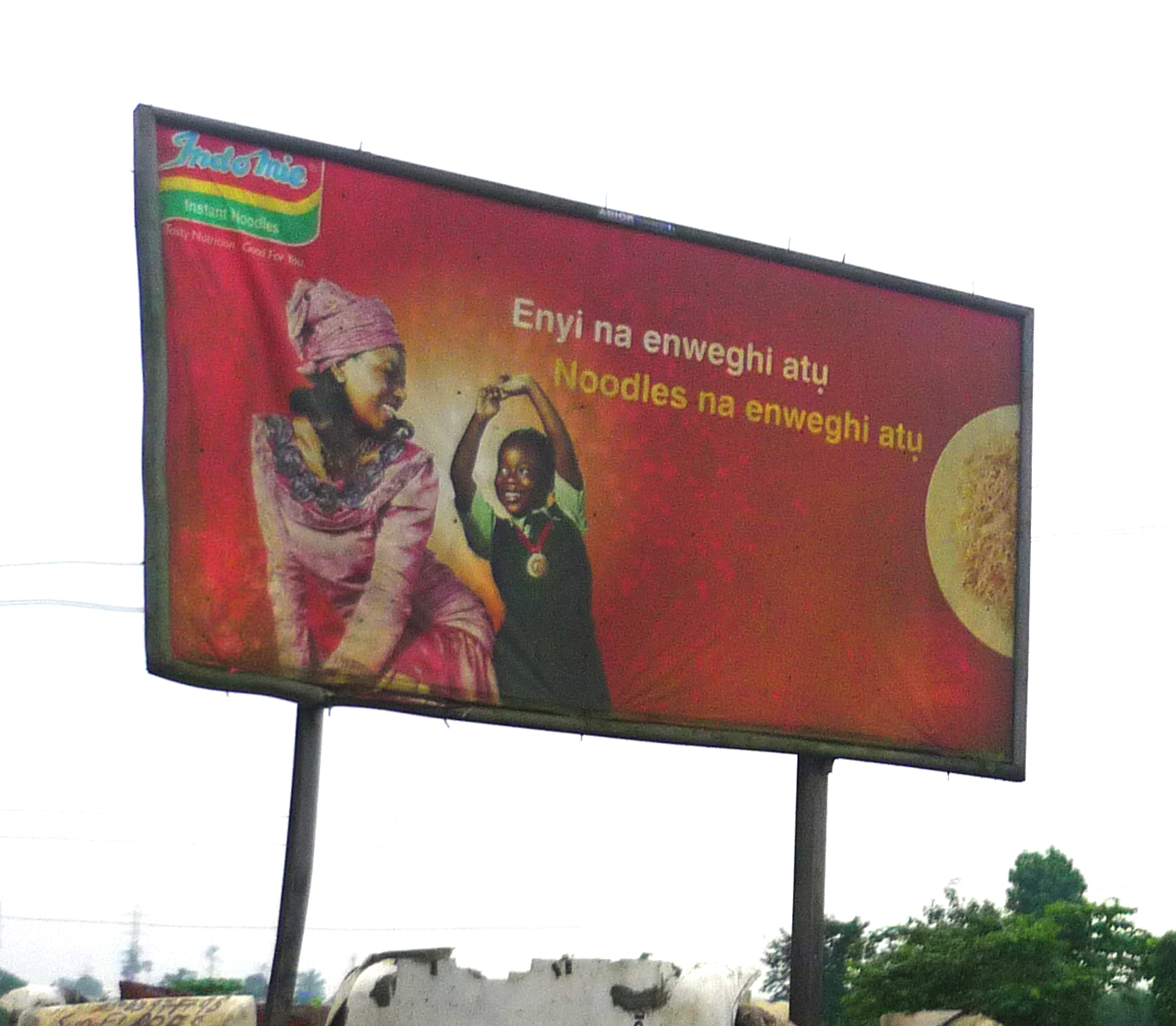
An advert in Igbo in Abia State

The geographic distribution of Nigeria's Niger-Congo languages is not limited to the middle east and south-central Nigeria, as migration allows their spread to the linguistically Afro-Asiatic northern regions of Nigeria, as well as throughout West Africa and abroad. Igbo words such as 'unu' for 'you people', 'sooso' for 'only', 'obia' for 'native doctoring', etc. are used in many English-based creole languages in the Americas, Yoruba is spoken as a ritual language in cults such as Santería in the Caribbean and South-Central America, and the now-extinct Berbice Creole Dutch language of Guyana is based on an Ijoid language.

Even the above listed linguistic diversity of the Niger–Congo in Nigeria is deceptively limiting, as these languages may further consist of regional dialects that may not be mutually intelligible. As such some languages, particularly those with a large number of speakers, have been standardised and received a romanised orthography. Nearly all languages appear in a Latin alphabet when written.

The Ibibio, Igbo, and Yoruba languages are notable examples of this process. The more historically recent standardisation and romanisation of Igbo have provoked even more controversy due to its dialectical diversity, but the Central Igbo dialect has gained the widest acceptance as the standard-bearer. Many such as Chinua Achebe have dismissed standardisation as colonial and conservative attempts to simplify a complex mosaic of languages.

Such controversies typify inter- and intra-ethnic conflict endemic to post-colonial Nigeria. Also worthy of note is the Enuani dialect, a variation of the Igbo that is spoken among parts of Anioma. The Anioma are the Aniocha, Ndokwa/Ukwuani, Ika and Oshimilli of Delta state. Standard Yoruba came into being due to the work of Samuel Crowther, the first African bishop of the Anglican Church and owes most of its lexicon to the dialects spoken in Ọyọ and Ibadan.

Since Standard Yoruba's constitution was determined by a single author rather than by a consensual linguistic policy by all speakers, the Standard has been attacked regarding for failing to include other dialects and spurred debate as to what demarcates "genuine Yoruba". Linguistically speaking, all demonstrate the varying phonological features of the Niger–Congo family to which they belong, these include the use of tone, nasality, and particular consonant and vowel systems; more information is available here.

=== Branches and locations ===
Below is a list of major Niger–Congo branches and their primary locations based on Blench (2019).

Distributions of Volta–Niger branches
Branch	Primary locations
Akpes	Akoko North LGA, Ondo State
Ayere–Ahan	Akoko North LGA, Ondo State
Gbe	Badagry LGA, Lagos State and adjacent areas
Yoruboid	South-West, Central, and South-South states of Nigeria
Edoid	Rivers, Edo, Ondo, Delta, and Bayelsa States
Akoko	Akoko North LGA, Ondo State
Igboid	East-Central, Rivers, and Delta States (including Igbo proper)
Ibibioid	Akwa Ibom and Cross River States
Nupoid	Niger, Kaduna, Kwara, Nasarawa, Kogi States and the FCT
Oko	Ogori-Magongo LGA, Kogi State
Idomoid	Benue, Cross River, Nasarawa States
Ukaan	Akoko North LGA, Ondo State

Distributions of Benue–Congo branches in Nigeria
Branch	Primary locations
Cross River	Cross River, Akwa Ibom, Bayelsa, and Rivers States
Bendi	Obudu and Ogoja LGAs, Cross River State
Mambiloid	Sardauna LGA, Taraba State; Cameroon
Dakoid	Mayo Belwa LGA, Taraba State and adjacent areas
Jukunoid	Taraba, Benue, Gombe, as Wãpha in Wase LGA, Plateau State
Yukubenic	Takum LGA, Taraba State
Kainji	Kauru LGA, Kaduna State and Bassa LGA, Plateau State; Kainji Lake area
Plateau	Plateau, Kaduna, and Nasarawa States
Tivoid	Benue, Nasrawa, Obudu LGA, Cross River, and Sardauna LGA, Taraba State; Northwest and Southwest regions, Cameroon
Beboid	Takum LGA, Taraba State; Northwest, Cameroon
Ekoid	Ikom and Ogoja LGAs, Cross River State; Cameroon
Grassfields	Sardauna LGA, Taraba State; Northwest, Southwest, West Regions, Cameroon
Jarawan (Bantu)	Bauchi, Plateau, Adamawa, and Taraba States

Distributions of Adamawa branches in Nigeria
Branch	Primary locations
Duru (Vere)	Fufore LGA, Adamawa State
Leko	Adamawa and Taraba States; Cameroon
Mumuye	Taraba State
Yendang	Mayo Belwa and Numan LGAs, Adamawa State
Waja	Kaltungo and Balanga LGAs, Gombe State
Kam	Bali LGA, Taraba State
Baa	Numan LGA, Adamawa State
Laka	Karim Lamido LGA, Taraba State and Yola LGA, Adamawa State
Jenjo	Karim Lamido LGA, Taraba State
Bikwin	Karim Lamido LGA, Taraba State
Yungur	Song and Guyuk LGAs, Adamawa State

In addition, Ijaw languages are spoken in Rivers State, Bayelsa State, and other states of the Niger Delta region. Mande languages are spoken in Kebbi State, Niger State, and Kwara State.

== Nilo-Saharan languages ==
In Nigeria, the Nilo-Saharan language family is represented by:

- Saharan languages:
  - Kanuri and Kanembu in the northeastern part of Nigeria in the states of Borno, Yobe and parts of Jigawa, and Bauchi states
  - Teda in northern Nigeria
- Songhai languages:
  - Zarma (Zabarma) and Dendi in Kebbi State, Zamfara State, Sokoto State, Niger State near the border with the neighbouring countries of Niger and northern Benin, also in Kaduna State, Yobe State and Lagos trading community.
- Central Sudanic languages:
  - Lau Laka, a recently discovered Central Sudanic language of Taraba State

== Foreign languages ==
French is compulsory in all schools. In January 2016, the Minister for Education Anthony Anwukah announced a wish to make French the second language of business in Nigeria because the majority of African countries are francophone and all of Nigeria's neighbouring countries are francophone.

== List of languages ==
This is a non-exhaustive list of languages spoken in Nigeria.

S/N	Language	Alternate names	Number of speakers	Native speakers	States spoken in	Current status	Language Varieties
1	Abanyom	Abanyum, Befun, Bofon, Mbofon	13,000		Cross River	Active	2
	Nigerian Pidgin English	Broken. Pidgin	80,200,000		All States	Active	
2	Abon	Abong, Abõ, Ba'ban	1,000		Taraba	Active	
3	Abua	Odual, Abuan	25,000		Rivers	Active	
4	Abureni	Mini	4,000		Bayelsa	Active	
5	Achipa	Achipawa	5,000		Kebbi	Active	
6	Adim		20,000		Cross River	Active	
7	Aduge		30,000		Anambra	Active	
8	Adun				Cross River	Active	
9	Afade	Affade, Afadeh, Afada, Kotoko, Moga	5,000		Borno, Yobe	Active	
10	Afo		25,000		Plateau	Active	
11	Afrike	Afrerikpe	60,000		Cross River		
12	Ajawa	Aja, Ajanci	0		Bauchi	Extinct	
13	Akaju-Ndem	Akajuk			Cross River	Active	
14	Akweya-Yachi		50,000		Benue	Active	
15	Alago	Arago	100,000		Plateau	Active	
16	Amo		12,300		Plateau	Active	
17	Anaguta				Plateau	Active	
18	Annang		2,740,000		Akwa Ibom	Active	
19	Angas		368,000		Bauchi, Jigawa, Plateau	Active	
20	Ankwei				Plateau	Active	
21	Arabic	Chadian Arabic also known as Shuwa Arabic	200,000	200,000	Borno by Shuwa Arabs	Active	
22	Anyima				Cross River	Active	
23	Arum				Nasarawa	Active	
24	Attakar	Ataka			Kaduna	Active	
25	Auyoka	Auyokawa, Auyakawa, Awiaka			Jigawa	Active	
26	Awori				Lagos, Ogun	Active	
27	Ayu				Kaduna	Active	
28	Babur				Adamawa, Bomo, Taraba, Yobe	Active	
29	Bachama				Adamawa	Active	
30	Bachere				Cross River	Active	
31	Bada				Plateau	Active	
32	Bade				Yobe	Active	
33	Bakulung				Taraba	Active	
34	Bali				Taraba	Active	
35	Bambora	Bambarawa			Bauchi	Active	
36	Bambuko				Taraba	Active	
37	Banda	Bandawa			Taraba	Active	
38	Banka	Bankalawa			Bauchi	Active	
39	Banso	Panso			Adamawa	Active	
40	Bara	Barawa			Bauchi	Active	
41	Barke				Bauchi	Active	
42	Baruba	Barba			Niger	Active	
43	Bashiri	Bashirawa			Plateau	Active	
44	Basa				Kaduna, Kogi, Niger, Plateau	Active	
45	Batta				Adamawa	Active	
46	Baushi				Niger	Active	
47	Baya				Adamawa	Active	
48	Bekwarra				Cross River	Active	
49	Bele	Buli, Belewa			Bauchi	Active	
50	Betso	Bete			Taraba	Active	
51	Bette				Cross River	Active	
52	Bilei				Adamawa Rivers	Active	
53	Bille		40,000		Adamawa Rivers	Active	
54	Bina	Binawa			Kaduna	Active	
55	Bini				Edo	Active	
56	Birom				Plateau	Active	
57	Bobua				Taraba	Active	
58	Boki	Nki			Cross River	Active	
59	Bokkos				Plateau	Active	
60	Boko	Bussawa, Bargawa			Niger	Active	
61	Bole	Bolewa			Bauchi, Yobe	Active	
62	Botlere				Adamawa	Active	
63	Boma	Bomawa, Burmano			Bauchi	Active	
64	Bomboro				Bauchi	Active	
65	Buduma				Borno, Niger	Active	
66	Buji				Plateau	Active	
67	Buli				Bauchi	Active	
68	Bunu				Kogi	Active	
69	Bura	Bura-Pabir			Borno, Adamawa, Yobe	Active	
70	Burak				Bauchi	Active	
71	Burma	Burmawa			Plateau	Active	
72	Buru				Yobe	Active	
73	Buta	Butawa			Bauchi	Active	
74	Bwall				Plateau	Active	
75	Bwatiye				Adamawa	Active	
76	Bwazza				Adamawa	Active	
77	Challa				Plateau	Active	
78	Chama	Chamawa Fitilai			Bauchi	Active	
79	Chamba	Chamba Daka, Chamba Leko			Adamawa, Taraba	Active	2
80	Chamo				Bauchi	Active	
81	Cibak	Chibbak, Chibok			Borno	Active	
82	Chinine				Borno	Active	
83	Chip				Plateau	Active	
84	Chokobo				Plateau	Active	
85	Chukkol				Taraba	Active	
86	Cipu	Western Acipa	20,000		Kebbi, Niger	Active	
87	Daba				Adamawa	Active	
88	Dadiya				Bauchi	Active	
89	Daka				Adamawa	Active	
90	Dakarkari				Niger, Kebbi	Active	
91	Danda	Dandawa			Kebbi	Active	
92	Dangsa				Taraba	Active	
93	Daza	Dere, Derewa			Bauchi	Active	
94	Degema				Rivers	Active	
95	Deno	Denawa			Bauchi	Active	
96	Dghwede		30,000		Borno	Active	
97	Diba				Taraba	Active	
98	Doemak	Dumuk			Plateau	Active	
99	Duguri				Bauchi	Active	
100	Duka	Dukawa			Kebbi	Active	
101	Duma	Dumawa			Bauchi	Active	
102	Ebana	Ebani			Rivers	Active	
103	Ebirra	Igbirra	1,000,000		Edo, Kogi, Ondo	Active	
104	Ebu				Edo, Kogi, Delta (Anioma)	Active	
105	Efik				Cross River	Active	
106	Egbema				Rivers, Imo	Active	
107	Eggon				Plateau	Active	
108	Egun	Gùn			Lagos, Ogun	Active	
109	Ejagham	Jagham			Cross River	Active	
110	Ekajuk				Cross River	Active	
111	Eket				Akwa Ibom	Active	
112	Ekoi				Cross River	Active	
113	Ekpeye	Ekpe ye			Rivers	Active	
114	Engenni	Ngene			Rivers	Active	
115	Epie				Rivers	Active	
116	English		178,000,000	40,000,000		Active	4
117	Esan	Ishan			Edo	Active	
118	Etche				Rivers	Active	
119	Etolu	Etilo			Benue	Active	
120	Etsako	Afenmai			Edo	Active	
121	Etung				Cross River	Active	
122	Etuno				Edo	Active	
123	Falli				Adamawa	Active	
124	French		1,000,000	200,000	Bordering states of Nigeria	Active	
125	Fula	Fulani, Fulbe, Fulfulde	20,000,000	18,000,000	Adamawa, Bauchi, Borno, Gombe, Jigawa, Kaduna, Kano, Katsina, Kebbi, Niger, Sokoto, Taraba, Yobe	Active	7
126	Fyam	Fyem			Plateau	Active	
127	Fyer	Fer			Plateau	Active	
128	Ga’anda				Adamawa	Active	
129	Gade				Niger	Active	
130	Galambi				Bauchi	Active	
131	Gamergu	Mulgwa, Malgo, Malgwa			Borno	Active	
132	Ganawuri	Qanawuri			Plateau	Active	
133	Gavako				Borno	Active	
134	Gbedde				Kogi	Active	
135	Gbo	Agbo, Legbo			Cross River	Active	
136	Gengle				Taraba	Active	
137	Geji				Bauchi	Active	
138	Gera	Gere, Gerawa			Bauchi	Active	
139	Geruma	Gerumawa			Bauchi, Plateau	Active	
140	Gingwak				Bauchi	Active	
141	Gira				Adamawa	Active	
142	Gizigz				Adamawa	Active	
143	Goernai				Kaduna	Active	
144	Gong		100,000			Active	Plateau
145	Gokana	Kana			Rivers	Active	
146	Gombi				Adamawa	Active	
147	Gornun	Gmun			Taraba	Active	
148	Gonia				Taraba	Active	
149	Gubi	Gubawa			Bauchi	Active	
150	Gude				Adamawa	Active	
151	Gudu				Adamawa	Active	
152	Gure				Kaduna	Active	
153	Gurmana				Niger	Active	
154	Gururntum				Bauchi	Active	
155	Gusu				Plateau	Active	
156	Gwa	Gurawa			Adamawa	Active	
157	Gwamba				Adamawa	Active	
158	Gwandara				Kaduna, Niger, Plateau	Active	
159	Gwari	Gbari			Kaduna, Niger, FCT, Nasarawa, Kogi	Active	
160	Gwom				Taraba	Active	
161	Gwoza		40,000		Borno	Active	
162	Gyem				Bauchi	Active	
163	Hausa		63,000,000	38,700,000	Bauchi, Borno, Gombe, Jigawa, Kaduna, Kano, Katsina, Kebbi, Niger, Plateau, Sokoto, Taraba, Yobe, Zamfara	Active	9
164	Humono	Kohumono			Cross River	Active	
165	Holma				Adamawa	Active	
166	Hona				Adamawa	Active	
167	Hyam	Ham, Jaba, Jabba			Kaduna	Active	
168	Ibeno				Akwa Ibom	Active	
169	Ibibio		10,700,000	6,200,000	Akwa Ibom, Cross River	Active	
170	Ichen				Adamawa	Active	
171	Idoma				Benue, Taraba	Active	
172	Igala				Kogi, Benue, Delta, Anambra	Active	
173	Igbo		33,000,000	33,000,000	Abia, Anambra, Delta, Ebonyi, Enugu, Imo, Rivers	Active	3
174	Igede	Egede			Benue	Active	
175	Ijaw	Izon	2,440,000	2,440,000	Bayelsa, Rivers, Delta, Ondo, Akwa-Ibom	Active	
176	Ijumu				Kogi	Active	
176	Ika				Delta, Edo	Active	
177	Ikorn				Cross River	Active	
178	Irigwe				Plateau	Active	
179	Isoko				Delta	Active	
180	Isekiri	Itsekiri	1,000,000		Delta	Active	
181	Iyala	Iyalla			Cross River	Active	
182	Izere	Izarek, Fizere, Fezere, Feserek, Afizarek, Afizare, Afusare, Jari, Jarawa, Jarawan Dutse, Hill Jarawa, Jos-Zarazon.	100,000		Plateau	Active	
183	Izondjo				Bayelsa, Delta, Ondo, Rivers	Active	
184	Jahuna	Jahunawa			Taraba	Active	
185	Jaku				Bauchi	Active	
186	Jara	Jaar, Jarawa, Jarawa-Dutse			Bauchi	Active	
187	Jere	Jare, Jera, Jera, Jerawa			Bauchi, Plateau	Active	
188	Jero				Taraba	Active	
189	Jibu				Adamawa	Active	
190	Jidda-Abu				Plateau	Active	
191	Jimbin	Jimbinawa			Bauchi	Active	
192	Jirai				Adamawa	Active	
193	Jju	Kaje, Kache			Kaduna	Active	
194	Jonjo	Jenjo			Taraba	Active	
195	Jukun				Bauchi, Benue, Taraba, Plateau	Active	
196	Kaba	Kabawa			Taraba	Active	
197	Kadara	Ajuah, Ajure, Adaa, Adara, Azuwa, Ajuwa, Azuwa, Eda			Kaduna, Niger	Active	
198	Kafanchan				Kaduna	Active	
199	Kagoro				Kaduna	Active	
200	Kajuru	Kajurawa			Kaduna	Active	
201	Kaka	Manenguba			Adamawa	Active	
202	Kamaku	Karnukawa			Kaduna, Kebbi, Niger		
203	Kambari				Kebbi, Niger		
204	Kamwe	(Kapsiki) in Cameroon	1.2 million native speakers		Adamawa, Borno and Republic of Cameroon	Active	
205	Kamo				Bauchi	Active	
206	Kanakuru	Dera			Adamawa, Borno	Active	
207	Kanembu				Borno	Active	
208	Kanikon				Kaduna	Active	
209	Kantana				Plateau	Active	
210	Kanufi				Kaduna	Active	
211	Kanuri		8,150,000	7,650,000	Borno, Kaduna, Adamawa, Kano, Niger, Jigawa, Plateau, Taraba, Yobe	Active	
212	Karai-Karai (language)	Karaikarai, Karekare			Bauchi, Yobe	Active	
213	Karimjo				Taraba	Active	
214	Kariya				Bauchi	Active	
215	Katab	Kataf			Kaduna	Active	
216	Kenern	Koenoem			Plateau	Active	
217	Kenton				Taraba	Active	
218	Kiballo	Kiwollo			Kaduna	Active	
219	Kilba				Adamawa	Active	
220	Kirfi	Kirfawa			Bauchi	Active	
221	Koma				Taraba	Active	
222	Kona				Taraba	Active	
223	Koro	Kwaro			Kaduna, Niger, Nasarawa	Active	
224	Kubi	Kubawa			Bauchi	Active	
225	Kudachano	Kudawa			Bauchi	Active	
226	Kugama				Taraba	Active	
227	Kulere	Kaler			Plateau	Active	
228	Kunini				Taraba	Active	
229	Kurama				Jigawa, Kaduna, Niger, Plateau	Active	
230	Kurdul				Adamawa	Active	
231	Kushi				Bauchi	Active	
232	Kuteb				Taraba	Active	
233	Kutin				Taraba	Active	
234	Kwah	Baa	18,000		Adamawa	Active	
235	Kwalla				Plateau	Active	
236	Kwami	Kwom			Bauchi	Active	
237	Kwanchi				Taraba	Active	
238	Kwanka	Kwankwa			Bauchi, Plateau	Active	
239	Kwaro				Plateau	Active	
240	Kwato				Plateau	Active	
241	Kyenga	Kengawa			Sokoto	Active	
242	Laaru	Larawa			Niger	Active	
243	Lakka				Adamawa	Active	
244	Lala				Adamawa	Active	
245	Lama				Taraba	Active	
246	Lamja				Taraba	Active	
247	Lau				Taraba	Active	
248	Ubbo				Adamawa	Active	
249	Limono				Bauchi, Plateau	Active	
250	Lopa	Lupa, Lopawa			Niger	Active	
251	Longuda	Lunguda			Adamawa, Bauchi	Active	
252	Mabo				Plateau	Active	
253	Mada				Kaduna, Plateau	Active	
254	Mama				Plateau	Active	
255	Mambilla				Adamawa	Active	
256	Manchok				Kaduna	Active	
257	Mandara	Wandala			Borno	Active	
258	Manga	Mangawa			Yobe	Active	
259	Margi				Adamawa, Borno	Active	
260	Matakarn				Adamawa	Active	
261	Mbembe				Cross River, Enugu	Active	
262	Mbol				Adamawa	Active	
263	Mbube				Cross River	Active	
264	Mbula				Adamawa	Active	
265	Mbum				Taraba	Active	
266	Memyang	Meryan			Plateau	Active	
267	Miango				Plateau	Active	
268	Miligili	Migili			Plateau	Active	
269	Miya	Miyawa			Bauchi	Active	
270	Mobber				Borno	Active	
271	Montol				Plateau	Active	
272	Moruwa	Moro’a, Morwa			Kaduna	Active	
273	Muchaila				Adamawa	Active	
274	Mumuye				Taraba	Active	
275	Mundang				Adamawa	Active	
276	Mupun		1,000,000		Plateau	Active	
278	Mushere				Plateau	Active	
279	Mwahavul	Mwaghavul			Plateau	Active	
280	Ndoro				Taraba	Active	
281	Ngamo				Bauchi, Yobe	Active	
282	Ngizim				Yobe	Active	
283	Ngweshe	Ndhang, Ngoshe-Ndhang			Adamawa, Borno	Active	
284	Ningi	Ningawa			Bauchi	Active	
285	Ninzam	Ninzo			Kaduna, Plateau	Active	
286	Njayi				Adamawa	Active	
287	Nkim				Cross River	Active	
288	Nkum				Cross River	Active	
289	Nokere	Nakere			Plateau	Active	
290	Nsukka				Enugu State and some parts of Kogi state	Active	
291	Nunku				Kaduna, Plateau	Active	
292	Nupe				Niger, Kwara, Kogi, FCT	Active	
293	Nyandang				Taraba	Active	
294	Obolo	Andoni			Akwa Ibom, Rivers	Active	
295	Ogba	Ogba	1000+		Rivers	Active	
296	Ogbia				Bayelsa	Active	
297	Ofutop	Ofutop (okangha(2)	5,000	4,000	Ikom, Okuni, Cross River	Active	
298	Ogori				Kwara	Active	
299	Okobo	Okkobor			Akwa Ibom	Active	
300	Okpamheri				Edo	Active	
301	Okpe	Okpe	1,000,000		Delta	Active	
302	Olulumo				Cross River	Active	
302	Oro	Oron	1,000,000		Akwa Ibom	Active	
303	Owan				Edo	Active	
304	Owe				Kwara	Active	
305	Oworo				Kwara	Active	
306	Pa’a	Pa’awa, Afawa			Bauchi	Active	
307	Pai				Plateau	Active	
308	Panyam				Taraba	Active	
309	Pero				Bauchi	Active	
310	Pire				Adamawa	Active	
311	Pkanzom				Taraba	Active	
312	Poll				Taraba	Active	
313	Polchi Habe				Bauchi	Active	
314	Pongo	Pongu			Niger	Active	
315	Potopo				Taraba	Active	
315	Pyapun	Piapung			Plateau	Active	
317	Qua				Cross River	Active	
318	Rebina	Rebinawa			Bauchi	Active	
319	Reshe				Kebbi, Niger	Active	
320	Rindire	Rendre			Plateau	Active	
321	Rishuwa				Kaduna	Active	
322	Ron				Plateau	Active	
323	Rubu				Niger	Active	
324	Rukuba				Plateau	Active	
325	Rumada				Kaduna	Active	
326	Rumaya				Kaduna	Active	
327	Sakbe				Taraba	Active	
328	Sanga				Bauchi	Active	
329	Sate				Taraba	Active	
330	Saya	Sayawa, Za’ar			Bauchi, Plateau, Kaduna, Abuja, Niger, Kogi	Active	
331	Segidi	Sigidawa			Bauchi	Active	
332	Shanga	Shangawa			Sokoto	Active	
333	Shangawa	Shangau			Plateau	Active	
334	Shan-Shan				Plateau	Active	
335	Shira	Shirawa			Kano	Active	
336	Shomo				Taraba	Active	
337	Shuwa				Adamawa, Borno	Active	
338	Sikdi				Plateau	Active	
339	Siri	Sirawa			Bauchi	Active	
340	Srubu	Surubu			Kaduna	Active	
341	Sukur				Adamawa	Active	
342	Sura				Plateau	Active	
343	Tangale				Bauchi	Active	
344	Tarok				Plateau, Taraba	Active	
345	Teme				Adamawa	Active	
346	Tera	Terawa			Bauchi, Bomo	Active	
347	Teshena	Teshenawa			Kano	Active	
348	Tigon				Adamawa	Active	
349	Tikar				Taraba	Active	
350	Tiv		4,560,000		Benue, Plateau, adamawa, Taraba, Nasarawa	Active	2
351	Tula				Bauchi	Active	
352	Tur				Adamawa	Active	
353	Ufia				Benue	Active	
354	Ukelle	Kele, Kukelle			Cross River	Active	
355	Ukwani	Kwale, Aboh			Delta	Active	
356	Uncinda				Kaduna, Kebbi, Niger, Sokoto	Active	
357	Uneme	Ineme			Edo	Active	
358	Ura	Ula			Niger	Active	
359	Urhobo		1,000,000		Delta	Active	
360	Utonkong				Benue	Active	
361	Uvwie		100,000		Delta	Active	
362	Uyanga				Cross River	Active	
363	Vemgo				Adamawa	Active	
364	Verre				Adamawa	Active	
365	Vommi				Taraba	Active	
366	Wagga				Adamawa	Active	
367	Waja				Bauchi	Active	
368	Waka				Taraba	Active	
369	Warja				Jigawa	Active	
370	Warji				Bauchi	Active	
371	Wula				Adamawa	Active	
372	Wurbo				Adamawa	Active	
373	Wurkun				Taraba	Active	
374	Yache				Cross River	Active	
375	Yagba				Kwara	Active	
376	Yakurr	Yako			Cross River	Active	
377	Yalla				Benue	Active	
378	Yandang				Taraba	Active	
379	Yergan	Yergum			Plateau	Active	
380	Yoruba		45,700,000	43,700,000	Kwara, Lagos, Ogun, Ondo, Oyo, Osun, Ekiti, Kogi, Edo	Active	2
381	Yott				Taraba	Active	
382	Yumu				Niger	Active	
383	Yungur				Adamawa	Active	
384	Yuom		250,000		Plateau	Active	
385	Zabara				Niger	Active	
386	Zaranda				Bauchi	Active	
387	Zarma	Dyerma, Dyarma, Dyabarma, Zabarma, Adzerma, Djerma, Zarbarma, Zerma, Zarmawa			Kebbi, Sokoto, Zamfara, Niger State, Yobe, Kaduna, Lagos	Active	
388	Zayam	Zeam			Bauchi	Active	
389	Zul	Zulawa			Bauchi		

== See also ==
- Niger-Congo languages
- Ethnic groups of Nigeria
- Language associations in Nigeria

== Bibliographies ==
- Crozier, David & Blench, Roger (1992) An Index of Nigerian Languages (2nd edition). Dallas: SIL.mbembe language in cross river
- Blench, Roger (1998) 'The Status of the Languages of Central Nigeria', in Brenzinger, M. (ed.) Endangered languages in Africa. Köln: Köppe Verlag, 187–206.
- Blench, Roger (2002) Research on Minority Languages in Nigeria in 2001. Ogmios.
- Blench, Roger (n.d.) Atlas of Nigerian Languages, ed. III (revised and amended edition of Crozier & Blench 1992)
- Kwache, Iliya Yame (2016) Kamwe People of Northern Nigeria :Origin, History and Culture
- Chigudu, Theophilus Tanko (2017); Indigenous peoples of North clCentral Nigeria Area: an endangered race.
- Blench, Roger (2019). An Atlas of Nigerian Languages (4th ed.). Cambridge: Kay Williamson Educational Foundation.
- Emenanjo, E. N. (2019). Four Decades in the Study of Nigerian Languages and Linguistics: A Festschrift for KayWilliamson.
- Lamle, Elias Nankap, Coprreality and Dwelling spaces in Tarokland. NBTT Press. Jos Nigeria in "Ngappak" journal of the Tarok Nation 2005
