= Ethnic groups in Gabon =

The Central African country of Gabon is home to an estimated 50 ethnic groups, with unique cultures and languages. The largest of these groups is the Fang people. Gabon is home to many different Bantu tribes and a population of pygmy people. In 2017, 16,162 Pygmies were recorded as living in Gabon.

Here is a partial list of the ethnic groups in Gabon, by province.

== Estuaire ==
- Fang
- Omyene Group
- Benga
- Akele
- Simba
- Beseki
- Seke

== Haut Ogooué ==
- Téké
- Mbahouin
- Obamba
- Bakaningui
- Nzebi
- Ndoumou
- Ndassa
- Ndumu
- Awandji
- Mbeté
- Haoussa

== Moyen Ogooué ==
- Apindji
- Galoa
- Fang
- Akele
- Vili
- Enenga

== Ngounié ==
- Akélé
- Banzebie
- Mitsogho
- Massango
- Bavarama
- Bapunu
- Apindji
- Bavungu
- Guisir
- Eviya

=== Mitsogho People ===
The Mitsoghos are the people of the Massifs de Chaillu mountains in the Ngounié province of Gabon. Tsogho is their language, hence the name Mi-Tsoghos (where the prefix "Mi" means plural). They are a relatively small ethnic group who are revered and feared for their abilities in conjuring spirits from the afterworld.

They may represent the first non-Baka Gabonese of the entire area. This knowledge can be extrapolated from the widespread usage of Mitsogho words and customs, especially pertaining to the animistic religious practices of all Gabonese ethnic groups. For example, Bwiti, the dominant religious doctrine of the country is a Mitshogo name and the Bwiti is based on the magic powers of "the sacred wood" or ibogha (small shrub - Tabernanthe iboga) which is also a Mitsogho word meaning "healing" (ibo) and "wood" (gha).

Nearly all healing ceremonies in Gabonese traditional culture involve the singing of Mitsogho songs. In fact, Mitsogho words are so well known throughout the entire country that at one point the government was considering making Mitsogho the national ethnic language.

The majority of modern Mitsoghos live in Libreville and Mouila; however, their roots can be traced back north–south into the tropical mountain forests just west of where the Ngounié river meets the Ogoué river to where the Ogoulou river meets the Ngounié river. The most prominent old village sites were located near the 70 mile-long Ikobé valley.

This small but fierce group of people were the last ethnic group to be defeated by the French colonists (around 1940). In long-lived Mitsogho lore, a warrior by the name of Mbombet A Gnaghé hid out in the Ikobé valley to stage guerrilla attacks against the French military. Mbombet supposedly had magical powers, but was finally betrayed by a woman.

The modern day offspring who can be traced directly back to Mbombet still hold special positions within the traditional Mitsogho tribal authority. They are usually celebrated magicians and healers.

== Nyanga ==
- Bapunu
- vili
- lumbu

== Ogooué-Ivindo ==
- Fang
- Bakota
- Mahongue
- Boungome
- Kwele
- Baschiwe
- Basimba people
- Akele

== Ogooué-Lolo ==
- Banzebi
- Puvi
- Akele
- Massango
- Aduma

== Ogooué-Maritime ==
- Omiene group( Oroungu, Nkomi)
- lumbu

== Woleu Ntem ==
- Fang
- Baka
