= Ndumu =

Ndumu may be,

- Ndumu language
- Vincent Ndumu
