= Ndamba language =

Bantu language

Ndamba
- Native to: Tanzania
- Region: Morogoro
- Native speakers: (55,000 cited 1987)
- Language family: Niger–Congo?: Atlantic–Congo; Benue–Congo; Bantoid; Bantu; Kilombero; Mbunga–Ndamba; Ndamba
- Writing system: Latin

Language codes
- ISO 639-3: ndj
- Glottolog: ndam1239
- Guthrie code: G.52
- Linguasphere: 99-AUS-ta

Ndamba or "Chindamba" is classified as a Bantu language. It is one of 87 languages spoken in Tanzania Most Chindamba speakers are bilingual in Swahili and Chindamba.

The other two languages most similar to Ndamba are Mbunga and Pogolo, because all of them belong to the same language group, which are the Kilombero languages.
