= Kaningi =

Kaningi or Kaning'i may be,

- Kaningi people
- Kaningi language
