= Mbama language =

Bantu language spoken in Central Africa

Mbama
- Mbamba, Ombamba, Mbaama, Mbaamba
- lembaama
- Native to: Republic of Congo, Gabon
- Region: Haut-Ogooué in Gabon
- Ethnicity: Mbama people
- Native speakers: (25,000 cited 2000–2004)
- Language family: Niger–Congo?: Atlantic–Congo; Benue–Congo; Bantoid; Bantu (Zone B); Mbete languages (B.60); Mbama

Language codes
- ISO 639-3: mbm
- Glottolog: omba1241
- Guthrie code: B.62

- Person: ombaama
- People: ambaama
- Language: lembaama

Mbama language is a Bantu language spoken in the Bambama District (Lekoumou Region) of the Republic of Congo and in Haut-Ogooué Province in Gabon by the Mbama people.

== Phonology ==
Consonants
	Labial	Alveolar	Palatal	Velar
Plosive	p b	t d	tʃ dʒ	k g
Prenasalized	ᵐp ᵐb, ᵐf ᵐv	ⁿt ⁿd	ⁿtʃ ⁿdʒ	ᵑk ᵑg
Fricative	f v	s		
Nasal	m	n	ɲ	ŋ
Approximant	w	l, r	j	

Vowels
	Front	Central	Back
High	i iː		u uː
Mid-high	e eː		o oː
Mid-low	ɛ ɛː		ɔ ɔː
Low		a aː	

Mbama also has two tones; high, and low.

== Bibliography ==
- Okoudowa, Bruno (2010). Morfologia verbal do lembaama (PhD thesis) (in Brazilian Portuguese). University of São Paulo. doi:10.11606/T.8.2010.tde-10112010-153708.
