= JKU =

JKU may refer to:

- JKU FC, a Zanzibari football club
- Jeep Wrangler, 2007–2017 models
- Johannes Kepler University Linz, in Austria
- Labir language, spoken in Nigeria
