= Ibhili language =

Bantu language spoken in Gabon

Vili
- Ibhili
- Native to: Gabon
- Region: Ngounié River
- Language family: Niger–Congo?: Atlantic–Congo; Benue–Congo; Bantoid; Bantu (Zone B); Nzebi (B.50); Vili

Language codes
- ISO 639-3: None (mis)
- Glottolog: vili1239
- Guthrie code: B.503

Vili (Ibhili) is a minor Bantu language of Gabon.
