= NGV =

NGV or ngv may refer to:

- Natural gas vehicle, an alternative fuel vehicle that uses compressed natural gas or liquefied natural gas
- National Gallery of Victoria, an art museum in Melbourne, Victoria, Australia
- ngv, the ISO 639-3 code for Nagumi language, Cameroon
