= Damlanci language =

Southern Bantoid language of Nigeria

Damlanci
- Damlawa, Damla
- Native to: Nigeria
- Region: Maccido village, Alkaleri LGA, Bauchi State
- Native speakers: 500-1,000 (ethnic); speakers over age 50 (2019)
- Language family: Niger–Congo?: Atlantic–Congo; Benue–Congo; Southern Bantoid; Bantu? (Zone A); Mbam; Jarawan; Damlanci

Language codes
- ISO 639-3: –

Damlanci (Damlawa, Damla) is a Southern Bantoid Jarawan language of Nigeria. It was reported by Roger Blench (2019), but is not reported in Ethnologue or Glottolog. Speakers are over age 50, located in Maccido village, Alkaleri LGA, Bauchi State.
