= Mwele =

Mwele may refer to

- Mwele Ntuli Malecela (born 1963), Director General of the Tanzanian National Institute for Medical Research
- Mwele language, a minor Bantu language of Gabon
- Mwele River, a tributary of Mwenezi River
