= Mbunga language =

Bantu language of Tanzania

Mbunga
- Native to: Tanzania
- Region: Iringa
- Native speakers: (29,000 cited 1987)
- Language family: Niger–Congo?: Atlantic–Congo; Benue–Congo; Bantoid; Bantu; Kilombero; Mbunga–Ndamba; Mbunga

Language codes
- ISO 639-3: mgy
- Glottolog: mbun1248
- Guthrie code: P.15
- Linguasphere: 99-AUS-tb

Mbunga is a Bantu language of Tanzania.
