= Mbonga =

Mbonga may be,

- Mboa language
- Mamute Mbonga
