= Nyash =

Nigerian slang term for buttocks

- Origin: Nigerian Pidgin
- Meaning: Buttocks, Backside

Nyash is a Nigerian slang word commonly used in Africa and beyond to describe large or prominent buttocks, both in reference to males and females. The term was added to the Oxford Dictionary in 2026.

== Etymology and usage ==
This term, derived from Nigerian Pidgin is commonly used in everyday speech, music, and on social media, reflecting the lively and expressive character of Nigerian slang. It has spread beyond Nigeria, featuring in Afrobeats songs and online memes, and often represents body positivity and playful humour in popular culture.
