= Danglong language =

Jarawan Bantu language of Nigeria

Danglong
- Damlawa
- Native to: Nigeria
- Region: Bauchi State (north of Yankari Game Reserve)
- Native speakers: <10 (2019)
- Language family: Niger–Congo?: Atlantic–Congo; Volta-Congo; Benue–Congo; Bantoid; Southern Bantoid; Jarawan; Nigerian Jarawan; Danglong

Language codes
- ISO 639-3: –

Danglong (Hausa exonym: Damlawa) is a critically endangered Jarawan Bantu language spoken in Danglong village, Bauchi State, Nigeria.

It is spoken by a few elderly individuals in Danglong village, which is located just north of Yankari Game Reserve in Bauchi State. A short word list collected by Roger Blench in 2019 revealed that its closest relative may be Zhar.
