= Kilombero languages =

Group of Bantu languages of Tanzania

Kilombero
- Geographic distribution: Tanzania
- Linguistic classification: Niger–Congo?: Atlantic–Congo; Benue–Congo; Southern Bantoid; Bantu (Zone G.50); Kilombero

Language codes
- Glottolog: None

The Kilombero languages are a group of Bantu languages of Tanzania established by Derek Nurse in 1988.

The languages, along with their Guthrie identifications, are:

- Pogolo (G50)
- Mbunga (P10), Ndamba (G50)
