= Wanzi language =

Bantu language

Wanzi
- Wandji
- Native to: Gabon
- Native speakers: 10,000 (2007)
- Language family: Niger–Congo?: Atlantic–Congo; Benue–Congo; Bantoid; Bantu (Zone B); Nzebi languages (B.50); Wanzi

Language codes
- ISO 639-3: wdd
- Glottolog: wand1266
- Guthrie code: B.501

Wanzi (Wandji) is a Bantu language spoken in Gabon.
