= Jarawa language (Nigeria) =

Bantu language spoken in Nigeria

Jarawa
- Region: northern Nigeria, near Bauchi
- Native speakers: 250,000 (dialects with ISO codes) (2006–2011)
- Language family: Niger–Congo?: Atlantic–Congo; Volta-Congo; Benue–Congo; Bantoid; Southern Bantoid; Jarawan; Nigerian Jarawan; Jarawa
- Dialects: Zhár (Bankal); Zugur (Duguri); Gwak (Gingwak); Ndaŋshi; Dòòrì; Mbat (Bada); Mùùn; Kantana; Dàmùl

Language codes
- ISO 639-3: Variously: jjr – Zhár (Bankal) dbm – Zugur (Duguri) bau – Mbat (Bada) jgk – Gwak (Gingwak)
- Glottolog: jara1263

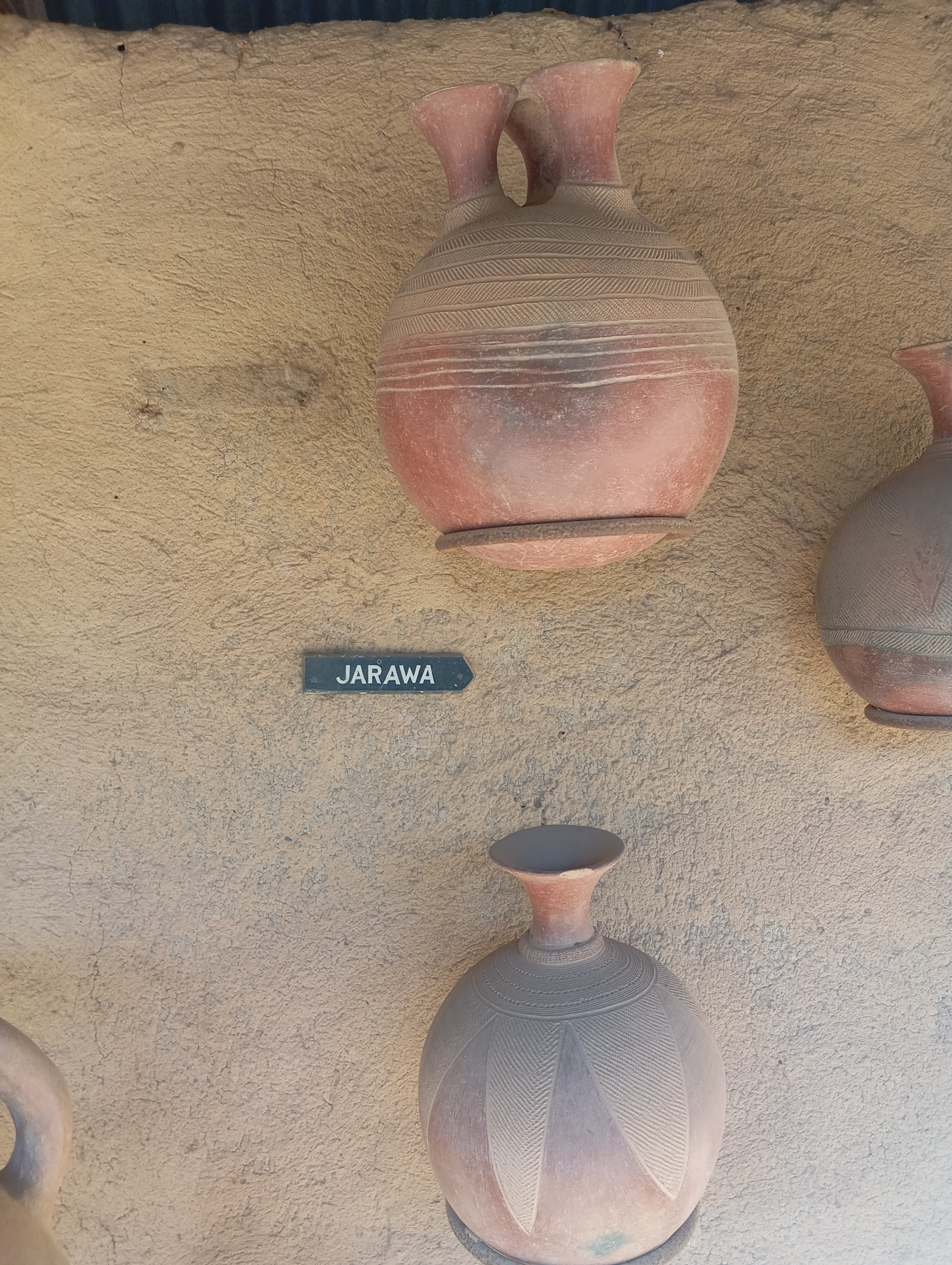
Jarawa pottery

Jarawa (also known as Jar or Jhar, or in Hausa: Jaranci) is the most populous of the Jarawan languages of northern Nigeria. It is a dialect cluster consisting of many varieties.

== Phonology ==
Consonants in the Mbat dialect
		Labial	Alveolar	Palatal	Velar	Glottal
Plosive	voiceless	p	t		k	(ʔ)
Plosive	voiced	b	d		ɡ	
Plosive	implosive	ɓ	ɗ			
Affricate	voiceless				k͡x	
Affricate	voiced			d͡ʒ	ɡ͡ɣ	
Fricative	voiceless	f	s	ʃ	(x)	
Fricative	voiced	(β)	z		(ɣ)	
Nasal		m	n	ɲ	ŋ	
Rhotic			r			
Approximant		w	l	j		

- /β/ only appears as a marginal phoneme.
- [ʔ] only appears in non-word-initial syllables.
- Sounds /n, t, l, r/ can be heard as palatal or retroflex [ɲ, ʈ, ɭ, ɽ] in word-final position. /k/ can also be heard as uvular [q] in the same position, and may also alternate with [ʁ] or [ɢ].
- Sounds /k͡x, ɡ͡ɣ/ can be heard as fricatives [x, ɣ] or [χ, ʁ] in intervocalic position.

Vowels in the Mbat dialect
	Front	Central	Back
Close	i		u
Near-close	ɪ		ʊ
Mid	(ɛ)	ə	(ɔ)
Open		a	

- Sounds /ɛ, ɔ/ only appear after glides.

== Dialects ==
Jarawa dialects are:

- Zhár (Bankal)
- Zugur (Duguri)
- Gwak (Gingwak)
- Ndaŋshi
- Dòòrì
- Mbat (Bada)
- Mùùn
- Kantana
- Dàmùl

Kantana may be a distinct language.

Blench (2019) lists these varieties as dialects of Jar (Jarawa).

- Zhar
- Ligri
- Kantana
- Bobar (?)
- Gwak (Gingwak)
- Dõõri
- Mbat
- Mbat-Galamkya

Danglong (also known as Damlawa in Hausa), which is likely most closely related to Zhar, was discovered by Roger Blench in 2019, who collected a short word list at the time. It is spoken by a few elderly individuals in Danglong village, which is located just north of Yankari Game Reserve in Bauchi State.

Maccido, a stone-walled settlement west of Yankari Game Reserve that is now deserted, was built on the western edge of Yankari Game Reserve, likely by Zhar or related peoples around the 18th century to protect themselves from slave raids.
