= Mwele language =

Language

Mwele
- Native to: Gabon
- Language family: Niger–Congo?: Atlantic–Congo; Benue–Congo; Bantoid; Bantu (Zone B); Nzebi (B.50); Mwele

Language codes
- ISO 639-3: None (mis)
- Glottolog: None
- Guthrie code: B.502

Mwele is a minor Bantu language of Gabon.
