= Duma language =

Bantu language

Duma
- Native to: Gabon
- Native speakers: (9,800 cited 2000)
- Language family: Niger–Congo?: Atlantic–Congo; Benue–Congo; Bantoid; Bantu (Zone B); Nzebi languages (B.50); Duma

Language codes
- ISO 639-3: dma
- Glottolog: duma1253
- Guthrie code: B.51

Duma is a Bantu language spoken in Gabon.
