= Gura language =

Jarawan Bantu language of Nigeria

Gura
- Gùrá
- Native to: Nigeria
- Region: Toro LGA, Bauchi State
- Language family: Niger–Congo?: Atlantic–Congo; Volta-Congo; Benue–Congo; Bantoid; Southern Bantoid; Jarawan; Nigerian Jarawan; Lame–Gwa; Lame; Gura

Language codes
- ISO 639-3: bma
- Glottolog: gura1253

Gùrá
- Person: Gùrá
- People: Màgùrá

Gura (Gùrá) is a Jarawan language spoken in Toro LGA, Bauchi State, Nigeria. It is one of the Lame languages.

A preliminary dictionary of Gura was compiled by Roger Blench in 2025.

== Background ==
Gura speakers are primarily subsistence farmers who grow sorghum, millet, yams, and cowpeas. 90% of Gura speakers are Muslims, although there is also a Christian minority.

There three major clans (nzali), each of which is led by a chief (ntuŋ) and has four lineages (ndo).

== Distribution ==
Gura is spoken in 10 villages in Toro LGA, Bauchi State. The village names below are all in the Gura language, except for 3 villages (Saya, Kulfana, and Rafi Ciwo) that have Hausa names.

- Saya (Hausa name)
- Fishere
- Mɔttɔ
- Gùrádē
- Ríígà
- Kúlfànà (Hausa name)
- Cɔ̀kɔ̀
- Zàlàw
- Rafi Ciwo (Hausa name)
- Jáwándò

== Phonology ==
Gura has six vowels, which are /a, e, i, o, u, ɨ/. All vowels have length contrast except for /ɨ/. Similarly, neighbouring West Chadic languages also tend to have six vowels.

Gura has two level tones, as well as a falling tone.

Plural nouns are marked by the prefix mV̀-.

There is a frozen noun class system.
