= Mbete languages =

Clade of languages

Mbete
- Mbere
- Linguistic classification: Niger–Congo?: Atlantic–Congo; Benue–Congo; Southern Bantoid; Bantu (Zone B.60); Teke–Mbere?; Mbete

Language codes
- ISO 639-3: –
- Glottolog: mber1262 (Mbere + Tchitchege + Teke-Tege)

The Mbete (Mbere) languages are a clade of Bantu languages coded Zone B.60 in Guthrie's classification. According to Nurse & Philippson (2003), the languages form a valid node. They are :

Mbete, Kaning'i, Mbaama–Mpini, Nduumo

Ethnologue 16 adds the Ngul (Ngoli) dialect of Dzing.
