= Teke–Mbede languages =

Proposed language family

Teke–Mbere
- Geographic distribution: Gabon, Republic of Congo
- Linguistic classification: Niger–Congo?: Atlantic–Congo; Benue–Congo; Southern Bantoid; Bantu (Zone B); Teke–Mbere
- Subdivisions: Nzebi; Mbete; Teke; Songo

Language codes
- Glottolog: moye1234

Teke–Mbere is a proposed intermediate group of Bantu languages, coded Zone B.50–80 in Guthrie's classification, along with the erstwhile Mbundu language Songo. According to Nurse & Philippson (2003), they are:

- Nzebi (B.50)
- Mbete (B.60)
- Teke (B.70–80)
- Songo (H.20)

Ethnologue suggests that the unclassified Songo "dialect" of Yansi (B.80) may be the same as the Songo here.
