= Tsaangi language =

Bantu language spoken in Central Africa

Tsaangi
- Icaangi
- Native to: Gabon, Republic of Congo
- Native speakers: (22,000 cited 2000)
- Language family: Niger–Congo?: Atlantic–Congo; Benue–Congo; Bantoid; Bantu (Zone B); Nzebi languages (B.50); Tsaangi

Language codes
- ISO 639-3: tsa
- Glottolog: tsaa1242
- Guthrie code: B.53

Tsaangi (Tsangui) is a Bantu language spoken in Gabon and the Republic of Congo.
