= Pogolo language =

Bantu language of Tanzania

Pogolo
- Chipogolo
- Native to: Tanzania
- Region: Morogoro
- Native speakers: (180,000 cited 1987)
- Language family: Niger–Congo?: Atlantic–Congo; Benue–Congo; Bantoid; Bantu; Kilombero; Pogolo

Language codes
- ISO 639-3: poy
- Glottolog: pogo1243
- Guthrie code: G.51
- Linguasphere: 99-AUS-s

The Pogoro (also Pogolo) are an ethnic and linguistic peoples based in Iringa Region and Morogoro Region, Tanzania.
