= Boungome people =

The Boungome are an ethnic group from the northeastern region of Gabon.
