= Ndumu language =

Bantu language spoken in Gabon

Nduumo
- Native to: Gabon
- Ethnicity: Bandumu
- Native speakers: 3,000 (2007)
- Language family: Niger–Congo?: Atlantic–Congo; Benue–Congo; Bantoid; Bantu (Zone B); Mbete languages (B.60); Nduumo

Language codes
- ISO 639-3: nmd
- Glottolog: ndum1239
- Guthrie code: B.63

Nduumo (Mindumbu) is a Bantu language spoken in Gabon.
