= Jarawan languages =

Bantu language group of Central Africa

Jarawan
- Geographic distribution: Southwest Cameroon (formerly), Southeast Nigeria
- Linguistic classification: Niger–Congo?: Atlantic–Congo; Volta-Congo; Benue–Congo; Bantoid; Southern Bantoid; Jarawan
- Proto-language: Proto-Jarawan

Language codes
- Glottolog: jara1262
- The Jarawan languages shown within Nigeria and Cameroon

Jarawan is a group of languages spoken mostly in Bauchi State, Nigeria, with some also scattered in Plateau State, Taraba State, and Adamawa State in the same country. Two related languages formerly spoken in Cameroon are now extinct but are believed to have belonged to the group. This connection between Nigerian and Cameroonian Jarawan is attributed to Thomas (1925).

== Classification ==
The classification of Jarawan according to Blench (2011) is:

- Mboa (Mbonga) (extinct)
- Nagumi (Ngong) (extinct)
- Nigerian Jarawan
  - Numan
    - 'Bile (Bille)
    - Mbula-Bwazza (dialect cluster): Mbula, Bwazza, Tambo
  - Mama (also sometimes called Kantana)
  - Lame (dialect cluster consisting of Rufu, Mbaru, Gura)–Gwa
  - Kulung
  - Jaku–Gubi: Shiki (Gubi), Dulbu, Labir (Jaku)
  - Jarawa (dialect cluster): Mbat (Baɗa), Galamkya, Duguri (Doori), Bankal, Kantana, Gwak, Danglong

Whether Jarawan languages are best classified alongside other Bantu languages or among non-Bantu Bantoid languages is a matter of ongoing debate. A number of descriptions and classifications in the early 20th century suggest that they may be historically related to Bantu languages but not necessarily Bantu themselves. Other perspectives based on lexicostatistic modeling and other phylogenetic techniques for language comparison argue instead that Jarawan languages are properly classified alongside Zone A Bantu languages (A31-A40-A60). For classifications based on these more recent studies, see for example Blench (2006), Piron (1997), and Grollemund (2012).

== History ==
Roger Blench (2026) hypothesizes a Proto-Jarawan Bantu migration to eastern Nigeria from what is now Cameroon (i.e., the Proto-Bantu homeland) approximately 1,500 years ago, since Jarawan Bantu currently does not have extensive internal diversity.

== Sociolinguistic situation ==
In Bauchi State, many speakers of Jarawan Bantu languages are Muslims, although some are also Christians. Many of the languages are endangered because speakers are shifting to Hausa, particularly among Muslims. Christians tend to speak their indigenous languages more often partly due to literacy programs and Bible translation projects.

== Names and locations ==
Below is a list of language names, populations, and locations adapted from Blench (2019).

	Language	Cluster	Dialects	Alternate spellings	Own name for language	Endonym(s)	Other names (location-based)	Other names for language	Exonym(s)	Speakers	Location(s)
Damlanci	unclassified		Damlawa	Damlanci					500–1000 ethnic population, but language now spoken by those over 50, although not moribund	Bauchi State, Alkaleri LGA, Maccido village	
Gwa	unclassified								Fewer than 1,000 (LA 1971)	Bauchi State, Toro LGA	
Jar cluster			Dṣ'arawa (Koelle 1854), Jarawa				Jar, Jarawan Kogi, Jarawan Kasa, Jaracin Kogi/Kasa			Plateau, Bauchi and Adamawa States	
Bobar (?)	Jar									Bauchi State, precise Location(s) unknown. May not exist as survey in 2007 failed to find such a language	
Doori	Jar	Previous sources (e.g. Maddieson & Williamson 1975) divided Duguri into a number of regional dialects, but this may not be valid since all Doori essentially speak mutually intelligible lects		Dõõri			Duguranci	Dugurawa		Bauchi State, Alkaleri, Tafawa Balewa LGAs; Plateau State, Kanam LGA	
Galamkya	Jar	may be dialect of Mbat				Kanna	Jar, Jarawan Kogi, Garaka	Badawa, Mbadawa	10,000 (SIL)	North-western Kanam LGA, southwest of Mbat, including Gyangyang 2 and Gidgid	
Gwak	Jar		Gingwak				Jaranci	Jarawan Bununu, Jaracin Kasa	19,000 (LA 1971)	Dass town and southward to Tafawa Balewa, west of the Gongola River, in Dass and Tafawa Balewa LGAs, Bauchi State	
Kantana	Jar						Kantanawa			Plateau State, Kanam LGA	
Ligri	Jar								800 speakers (Ayuba est. 2008).	Taraba State, Karim Lamido LGA	
Mbat	Jar		Mbada, Bat, Bada, Baɗa			Kanna	Jar, Jarawan Kogi, Garaka	Badawa, Mbadawa	10,000 (SIL)	North-central part of Kanam LGA, Plateau State, centered at Gagdi-Gum	
Zhar	Jar	Dumbulawa (Sutumi village) may speak a Ɓankal dialect		Zhar		Ɓankal, Bankal, Bankala	Bankalanci, Baranci	Bankalawa	20,000 (LA 1971)	Dass town and northward to Bauchi town, west of the Gongola River, in Dass, Bauchi, and Toro LGAs, Bauchi State	
Jaku-Gubi cluster											
Labɨr			Lábɨ́r			Jaku, Jaaku	Jakanci		Spoken in about 10 villages, perhaps 5000 speakers (2019 est.)	Bauchi State, south of the Bauchi-Gombe Road, from the Gongola River at Kanyallo, in Bauchi LGA, to Gar in Alkaleri LGA	
Shɨkɨ						Gubi, Guba		Gubawa	300 (LA 1971)	Bauchi State, Bauchi LGA	
Dulbu									80 (LA 1971)	Bauchi State, Bauchi LGA	
Lame cluster									2,000 (1973 SIL)	Bauchi State, Toro LGA, Lame district	
Ruhu	Lame		Rufu, Rùhû					Rufawa	There were said to be no speakers remaining in 1987		
Mbaru	Lame		Mbárù, Bambaro, Bamburo, Bambara, Bombaro, Bomboro, Bamboro					Bomborawa, Bunborawa	3500–4500 (CAPRO 1995a). Tulu town, Toro LGA, Bauchi State		
Gura	Lame			Tu–Gura	sg. Ba–Gura, pl. Mo–Gura		Agari, Agbiri				
Mbula cluster									7,900 (1952); 25,000 (1972 Barrett); 23,447 (1977) Blench: not clear as to whether for Mbula or both Mbula and Bwazza.)	Adamawa State, Numan, Shelleng and Song LGAs	
Mbula	Mbula										
Tambo	Mbula										
Bwazza	Mbula	No dialects		Ɓwà Ɓwàzà pl. àɓwàzà	Ɓwázà	Bare, Bere [name of a town]				Adamawa State, Demsa, Numan, Shelleng and Song LGAs. 26 villages.	
Ɓile	Mbula	Kun–Ɓíilé is said to be mutually intelligible with Mbula	Bille, Bili, Bilanci	Kun–Ɓíilé	ɓa Ɓíilé				30,000 (CAPRO, 1992); there are 36 villages reported to be entirely Ɓile-speaking, and another 16 where some Ɓile is spoken	Adamawa State, Numan LGA, 25 km south of Numan, east of the Wukari road.	
Mama	n/a						Kwarra		7,891 (1922 Temple); 6,155 (1934 Ames); 20,000 (1973 SIL)	Nasarawa State, Akwanga LGA	
Kulung	n/a			Kúkùlúŋ	Bákùlúng	Bambur, Wurkum		Wurkunawa (Gowers 1907)	15,000 (SIL)	Taraba State, Karim Lamido LGA, at Balasa, Bambur and Kirim; Wukari LGA, at Gada Mayo	

== Characteristics ==
The vast majority of what is known by linguists about Jarawan languages is gleaned from wordlists, many of which were compiled very early in the 20th century, and contain anywhere from a couple dozen to approximately 400 words, and occasionally a few phrases or simple sentences. Jarawan languages are sometimes argued to be Bantu languages given the presence of certain Bantu cognates, but the number and types of these cognates are not robust. The Jarawan lexicon is heavily influenced by Chadic languages, and particularly Hausa, due to contact.

Perhaps due to contact with Chadic languages, Jarawan languages have "frozen" prefixes that are likely vestiges of a lost noun class system; this is discussed in Blench (2007) and earlier in Maddieson & Williamson (1975). This is not to say that the prefixes themselves are from Chadic, but rather likely from an earlier ancestor. The prefixes are no longer productive, and there is no related system of agreement or concord, as found in modern day Bantu languages. Jarawan languages for which information is available appear to make a simple opposition between singular and plural wherein a singular noun is equivalent to the noun stem, and the plural is formed by the same prefix, at least for countable nouns.

Jarawan languages exhibit predominantly isolating (analytic) morphology. Other than plural prefixes on nouns, the only affixation yet noted is aspectual Habitual and Perfective suffixes, or verb "extensions" whose form depends on the shape of the verb stem. This is discussed in Gerhardt (1988) for "Jar" and Kantana, but also by Green (2020, 2021) for Mbat (Bada).

Although Jarawan had undergone Chadic influence during its earlier days, the reverse situation of a Chadic language being influenced by Jarawan is found in the curious case of Chadic Kulung being extensively influenced by the surrounding Jarawan Kulung language. Speakers of both languages identify as ethnic Kulung, but the languages belong to unrelated language families.

== Previous studies ==
Blench (2006) presents the early research as follows: "The Jarawan Bantu languages have always been something of a poor relation to Bantu proper. Scattered across northern Cameroun and east-central Nigeria, they remain poorly documented and poorly characterised. The first record of Jarawan Bantu is Koelle (1854), whose Dṣạ̄rāwa probably corresponds to modern-day Bankal. Gowers (1907) has six wordlists of Jarawan Bantu (Bomborawa, Bankalawa, Gubawa, Jaku, Jarawa, and Wurkunawa) included in his survey of the largely Chadic languages of the Bauchi area. Strümpell (1910) has a wordlist of the Jarawan Bantu language Mboa, formerly spoken on the Cameroon/CAR border near Meiganga. Strümpell (1922) and Baudelaire (1944) are the only records of Nagumi, based around Natsari, SE of Garoua in northern Cameroun. Johnston (1919: 716 ff.) assigned the language recorded by Koelle to a "Central-Bauci" one of his "Semi-Bantu" language groups. Thomas (1925, 1927) recognised the Bantu affinities of the Nigerian Jarawan Bantu languages, but Doke (1947) and Guthrie (1969–71) make no reference to Jarawan Bantu, and the latest reference book on Bantu also excludes it (Nurse & Philippson 2003). Some Jarawan Bantu languages are listed in the Benue–Congo Comparative wordlist (henceforth BCCW) (Williamson & Shimizu 1968; Williamson 1973) and a student questionnaire at the University of Ibadan in the early 1970s provided additional sketchy data on others."

In addition, Kraft's (1981) Chadic wordlists includes data on Bankal and Jaku. Sachnine & Dieu (1974) and Mohammadou (1979) include word lists for Ngong, which may be the same language as the now extinct Cameroonian language Nagumi. Also for Cameroonian Jarawan, Mohammadou (1980) contains a wordlist for Mboa, also called Mbɔŋa. These are summarized in Mohammadou (2002/2020). In 2016, Adelberger & Kleinewillinghöfer published a history sketch and lexicon of Kulung, as compiled by the missionary Ira McBride.

According to Blench (2006): "Maddieson & Williamson (1975) represents the first attempt to synthesise this data on the position of these languages. Since that period, publications have been limited.. .. Lukas and Gerhardt (1981) analyse some rather hastily collected data on Mbula, while Gerhardt (1982) published an analysis of some of this new data and memorably named the Jarawan Bantu "the Bantu who turned back". Gerhardt (1982) provides data on verbal extensions in Mama and Kantana. Blench (2006) likewise classified them as Bantu languages. Ulrich Kleinewillinghöfer has made available a comparative wordlist of six Jarawan Bantu lects; Zaambo (Dukta), Bwazza, Mbula, Bile, Duguri and Kulung, collected in the early 1990s as part of the SFB 268."

Wycliffe Nigeria has conducted two surveys of Jarawan groups in Nigeria, the Mbula-Bwazza (Rueck et al. 2007) and the Jar cluster (Rueck et al. 2009) providing much new and more accurate data in the status of Jarawan in Nigeria.

Work begun in 2018 by Green at Syracuse University has focused on languages of the "Jar" cluster, and particularly on description and documentation of Mbat (Bada) and Duguri.

== Bibliography ==
- Adelberger, Jörg & Ulrich Kleinewillinghöfer. 2016. A Kulung vocabulary: compiled by the missionary Ira McBride. Johannes Gutenberg Universitat: Mainz.
- ALCAM 1984. Atlas linguistique du Cameroun. ACCT.
- Blench, Roger. 2006. Jarawan Bantu: New Data and Its Relation to Bantu.
- Dieu, M. & M. Sachnine. 1974. Vocabulaire Ngong: Yaoundé: CERDETOLA.
- Gerhardt, L. 1982. Jarawan Bantu: The mistaken identity of the Bantu who turned north. Afrika und Übersee, LXV:75–95.
- Gerhardt, L. 1988. A note on verbal extensions in Jarawan Bantu. Journal of West African Languages, XVIII,2:3–8.
- Gowers, W.F. 1907. 42 vocabularies of languages spoken in Bauchi Province, N. Nigeria. ms. National Archives, Kaduna.
- Green, Christopher R. 2020. Harmony and disharmony in Mbat (Jarawan Bantu) verbs. Linguistique et Langues Africaines 6, 43–72.
- Green, Christopher R. 2021. On the link between onset clusters and codas in Mbat (Jarawan Bantu). Natural Language and Linguistic Theory 39, 97–122.
- Grollemund, Rebecca. 2012. Nouvelles approaches en classification: Application aux langues bantu du nord-ouest. PhD dissertation, Université Lumière Lyon 2.
- Guthrie, M. 1969–71. Comparative Bantu. (4 vols.) Farnborough: Gregg.
- ̈Kraft, Charles (1981). Chadic wordlists. Berlin: Reimer.
- Maddieson, I. and K. Williamson 1975. Jarawan Bantu. African Languages, 1:125–163.
- Meek, C.K. 1925. The Northern Tribes of Nigeria. 2 vols. London: Oxford University Press.
- Meek, C. K. 1931. Tribal Studies in Northern Nigeria. (2 vols) London: Kegan Paul.
- Mohammadou, Eldridge. 2002/2020. Jarawan Bantu expansion from the eastern upper Benue Basin, ca. 1700–1750. In Environmental and cultural dynamic in the West African Savanna, Proceedings of the International Conference, Maiduguri, 4–8 March 2002.
- Piron, Pascale. 1997. Classification interne du group bantoïde. Munich: Lincom Europa.
- Rueck, Michael J. Nengak Bako, Luther Hon, John Muniru, Linus Otronyi, and Zachariah Yoder 2009. Preliminary Impressions from the Sociolinguistic Survey of the Jar Dialects. ms. Jos.
- Rueck, Michael J. Zachariah Yoder & Katarína Hannelova. 2007. Sociolinguistic Survey of the Mbula, Tambo, Bakopi, Gwamba, Bwazza, Kulung and Bille people, of Adamawa and Taraba States, Nigeria. ms. Jos.
- Shimizu, K. 1983. Die Jarawan-Bantusprachen des Bundesstaates Bauchi, Nordnigeria. In Sprache Geschichte und Kultur in Afrika. R. Vossen & Claudi, U. (eds.) 291–301. Hamburg: Buske.
- Strümpell, F. 1910. Vergleichendes Wörterverzeichnis der Heidensprachen Adamauas. Mit Vorbemerkungen von B. Struck. Zeitschrift für Ethnologie. XLII:444–488.
- Thomas, N.W. 1925 The Languages. In: The Northern Tribes of Nigeria. C.K. Meek ed. 132–247. London: Oxford University Press.
- Williamson, K. (1971) The Benue–Congo languages and Ijo. In Current Trends in Linguistics, 7 (pp. 245–306) ed. T. Sebeok.
- Williamson, Kay 1972. Benue–Congo comparative wordlist: Vol.2. Ibadan: West African Linguistic Society.
- Williamson, K., and K. Shimizu. 1968. Benue–Congo comparative wordlist, Vol. 1. Ibadan: West African Linguistic Society.
