= Kaning'i language =

Bantu language spoken in Gabon

Kaning'i
- Lekaningi
- Native to: Gabon
- Ethnicity: Kaningi, Bongo pygmies
- Native speakers: 1,000 (2007)
- Language family: Niger–Congo?: Atlantic–Congo; Benue–Congo; Bantoid; Bantu (Zone B); Mbete languages (B.60); Kaning'i

Language codes
- ISO 639-3: kzo
- Glottolog: kani1279
- Guthrie code: B.602

Kaningi (Kaning'i) is a Bantu language spoken in Gabon. Speakers live in villages scattered among other peoples; the Bongo pygmies speak a distinct dialect.
