= Language associations in Nigeria =

Language associations in Nigeria are bodies of academics in Nigerian tertiary institutions that constitute people who are professionals in language oriented disciplines such as general linguistics, and language-specific ones such as international languages. The latter groups of languages include French, Arabic, Portuguese and German languages. The Renown language associations in Nigeria include Linguistic Association of Nigeria LAN, Association of Sign Language Interpreters in Nigeria, English Scholars Association of Nigeria ESAN, Association of Phoneticians and Phonologists in Nigeria. The linguistic associations also include those of the Nigerian indigenous languages such as Association of Teachers of Yoruba Language and Culture, Nigeria also known as Egbe Akomolede ati Asa Yoruba. Other associations in the International language categories include the University French Teachers Association of Nigeria UFLAN.
