= Nzebi languages =

Nzebi
- Njebi
- Geographic distribution: Central reaches of the Congo River and adjacent areas
- Linguistic classification: Niger–Congo?: Atlantic–Congo; Benue–Congo; Southern Bantoid; Bantu (Zone B.50); Teke–Mbere?; Nzebi

Language codes
- ISO 639-3: –
- Glottolog: njeb1244 (Njebi)

The Nzebi languages are a series of Bantu languages spoken in the western Congo and in Gabon. They are coded Zone B.50 in Guthrie's classification. According to Nurse & Philippson (2003), the Nzebi languages form a valid node with West Teke (B.70). The languages are:

(B.50) Nzebi, Wanzi, Duma, Tsaangi, (B.70) West Teke (Tsaayi, Laali, Yaa/Yaka, Tyee)

Maho (2009) adds B502 Mwele and B503 Vili (Ibhili).
