= Kaningi people =

The Akanigui (also Kanigui or Bakaniki) are an ethnic group in Gabon. They live in the Haut-Ogooué region, northwest of Franceville. They speak a Bantu language, the Kaningi language, whose number of speakers was estimated as 6,000 in 1990. There were about 6,000 Akanigui in Gabon in 1990.

== Bibliography ==
- (in English) David E. Gardinier, Historical dictionary of Gabon, Scarecrow Press, Metuchen, N.J.; Londres, 1981, p. 120
