= Vincent Ndumu =

Cameroonian civil engineer

Vincent Nji Ndumu

Government Delegate Bamenda City Council
- Incumbent
- Assumed office March 20, 2009 - February 2020
- President: Paul Biya
- Preceded by: Abel Ndeh Tadzong
- Succeeded by: Mayor Paul Achombong

Personal details
- Education: University of Manchester
- Nickname(s): Delegue, Ngia Vincent, Nji

Vincent Ndumu Nji is a Cameroonian civil engineer, corporate executive, and politician who served as the Government Delegate to the Bamenda City Council from 2009 until the dissolution of the office in 2020.

He transitioned from public administration back to private practice. He currently serves as the Chief Executive Officer of the infrastructure and contracting firms SWIN Company and Renaissance Engineering LTD.

== Civil Service Career (1985–2004) ==
Ndumu began his career in the Cameroonian civil service in 1985 within the ministry responsible for national equipment. Over two decades, he held sequential technocratic and administrative portfolios:

• 1990: Appointed Service Head for Direct Works.

• 1993–1997: Served as the Provincial Delegate of Public Works for the Northwest Province.

• 2000–2002: Appointed Deputy Director of Public Works in Yaoundé.

• 2002–2004: Appointed Chairman of Road Weighing Operations under the Prime Minister's Office to regulate heavy transport and infrastructure protection.

• 2003–2004: Served concurrently as Technical Adviser (Conseiller Technique) to the Minister of Public Works.

== Government Delegate to Bamenda (2009–2020) ==
On 2 March 2009, President Paul Biya signed a presidential decree appointing Ndumu as the Government Delegate to the Bamenda City Council, succeeding Abel Ndeh Tadzong, who had occupied the office for 16 years.

Municipal Administration and Infrastructure

Using his background in structural engineering, Ndumu enacted a strict urban enforcement policy aimed at modernising Bamenda's municipal layout. His administration prioritized:

• Urban Re-organisation: The demolition of irregular structures to expand transit corridors.

• Road Infrastructure: Directing major municipal paving, drainage, and road alignment projects to accommodate the city’s rapid demographic growth.

• Institutional Governance: Serving concurrently as the President of the Tenders Committee for the Cameroon General Certificate of Education (GCE) Board to oversee public contract allocations.

== Transition to Private Sector (2020–Present) ==
Following the structural resolutions of the 2019 Grand National Dialogue, the Government of Cameroon legally abolished the colonial-era office of "Government Delegate," replacing it with a democratically decentralised "City Mayor" system elected by municipal councillors.

Ndumu formally completed his tenure on 25 February 2020 and opted not to run for the successor office of City Mayor. He subsequently returned to the private sector full-time. He operates as the Chief Executive Officer of SWIN Company and Renaissance Engineering LTD, executing major private and contractual civil engineering and road construction projects across Cameroon.

After the Grand National Dialogue which scrapped the position of Government Delegate replacing the role with City Mayors, he chose not to run for office again and instead focused on his work as a civil engineer building roads across the country. He is CEO of SWIN Company and Renaissance Engineering LTD.
