= Mbama people =

Ethnic group

The Mbama or Obamba are an ethnic group located largely in Gabon's Haut-Ogooué Province and the Republic of Congo. The Obamba people's traditional language is Mbama or Mbete, which is often also referred to as Obamba.
