= Jonjo =

Jonjo is a rare given Irish name. Notable people with the name include:

- Jonjo Dickman (born 1981), English footballer
- Jonjoe Kenny (born 1997), English footballer
- Jonjo O'Neill (jockey) (born 1952), Irish racehorse trainer
- Jonjo O'Neill (actor) (born 1978), Irish actor
- Jonjo Shelvey (born 1992), English footballer
