= Lame language =

Bantu dialect cluster of Nigeria

Lame
- Tu-Gura
- Native to: Nigeria
- Region: Bauchi State
- Native speakers: (10,000 cited 1995)
- Language family: Niger–Congo?: Atlantic–Congo; Volta-Congo; Benue–Congo; Bantoid; Southern Bantoid; Jarawan; Nigerian Jarawan; Lame–Gwa; Lame
- Dialects: Rufu; Mbaru; Gura

Language codes
- ISO 639-3: bma
- Glottolog: lame1257

Gura
- Person: Ba-Gura
- People: Mo-Gura
- Language: Tu-Gura

Lame is a Jarawan dialect cluster spoken Nigeria. The Rufu (Ruhu, Rùhû) and Mbaru (Mbárù) dialects are extinct as of 1987. Blench (2019) also lists Gura as a variety. Gura was documented and described by Blench in 2025.
