= Mboa language =

Language of Cameroon

Mboa
- Mbonga
- Region: Cameroon
- Extinct: (date missing)
- Language family: Niger–Congo?: Atlantic–Congo; Benue–Congo; Southern Bantoid; Jarawan; Mboa

Language codes
- ISO 639-3: xmb
- Glottolog: mbon1252
- ELP: Mbonga

Mboa, also known as Mbonga, is an apparently extinct language of Cameroon. Ethnologue reports 1,490 speakers cited to 2000, possibly the ethnic population.
