= Dulbu language =

Bantu languages of Nigeria

Dulbu
- Native to: Nigeria
- Region: Bauchi State
- Native speakers: 0 (2019)
- Language family: Niger–Congo?: Atlantic–Congo; Volta-Congo; Benue–Congo; Bantoid; Southern Bantoid; Jarawan; Nigerian Jarawan; Jaku–Gubi; Dulbu

Language codes
- ISO 639-3: dbo
- Glottolog: dulb1238
- ELP: Dulbu

Dulbu is an extinct Jarawan Bantu language of Nigeria. Speakers have since shifted to Hausa.

== Extinction ==
In 2019, Dulbu was found to be extinct. K. Shimizu's word list of Dulbu from around the 1980s is thus the only word list available.
