= Nagumi language =

Extinct language of Cameroon

Nagumi
- Ngong
- Region: Cameroon
- Extinct: by 1983
- Language family: Niger–Congo?: Atlantic–Congo; Benue–Congo; Southern Bantoid; Jarawan; Nagumi

Language codes
- ISO 639-3: ngv – inclusive code Individual code: nnx – Ngong (retired)
- Glottolog: nagu1244 Nagumi ngon1275 Ngong (retired)
- ELP: Ngong

Nagumi, also known as Ngong (Gong, Puuri) and Mbama (Bama), is an extinct Jarawan language of the North Province of Cameroon.

== History ==
By 1910, Nagumi was "mostly forgotten"; F. Strümpell could only collect a few words from an old blind man in Alhajin Galibu. H. Baudelaire also collected numerals in Nagumi from 1 to 10. By 1983, Nagumi was extinct. Ngong had only two fluent speakers in 1974.

== Classification ==
Nagumi is classified as an independent member of the Jarawan language family.

== Vocabulary ==
=== Numerals ===
The numeral fade 'four' in Nagumi originates from an unknown Chadic language.
