= Gwa language =

Bantu language of Nigeria

Gwa
- Native to: Nigeria
- Region: Bauchi State
- Native speakers: (980 cited 2000)
- Language family: Niger–Congo?: Atlantic–Congo; Volta-Congo; Benue–Congo; Bantoid; Southern Bantoid; Bantu; Mbam-Bube-Jarawan; Jarawan; Nigerian Jarawan; Lame–Gwa; Gwa

Language codes
- ISO 639-3: gwb
- Glottolog: gwaa1239
- Linguasphere: 99-AAB-b

Gwa is one of the Bantu languages spoken in Nigeria.
