= Kulung language (Jarawan) =

Bantu language spoken in Nigeria

Kulung
- Kúkùlúŋ
- Native to: Nigeria
- Region: Taraba State
- Native speakers: 40,000 (2012)
- Language family: Niger–Congo?: Atlantic–Congo; Volta-Congo; Benue–Congo; Bantoid; Southern Bantoid; Jarawan; Nigerian Jarawan; Kulung

Language codes
- ISO 639-3: bbu
- Glottolog: kulu1255
- ELP: Kulung (Nigeria)

Kùlúng
- People: Bákùlúng
- Language: Kúkùlúŋ

Kulung is a Jarawan language spoken in Nigeria.

Kulung can also refer to an unrelated Chadic language of the same name spoken in Karim Lamido LGA of Taraba State and related to Piya.
