= Bile language =

Bantu languages of Nigeria

Bile
- Kun-Ɓíilé
- Native to: Nigeria
- Region: Adamawa State
- Native speakers: 38,000 (2012)
- Language family: Niger–Congo?: Atlantic–Congo; Volta-Congo; Benue–Congo; Bantoid; Southern Bantoid; Jarawan; Nigerian Jarawan; Numan; Bile

Language codes
- ISO 639-3: bil
- Glottolog: bile1244

Ɓíilé
- People: ɓa Ɓíilé
- Language: Kun-Ɓíilé

Bile (Bille) is a Jarawan language spoken in Nigeria. They can be found domiciled in Adamawa state below the Benue river.
