= Yankari Game Reserve =

National park in Nigeria

- IUCN category II (national park)
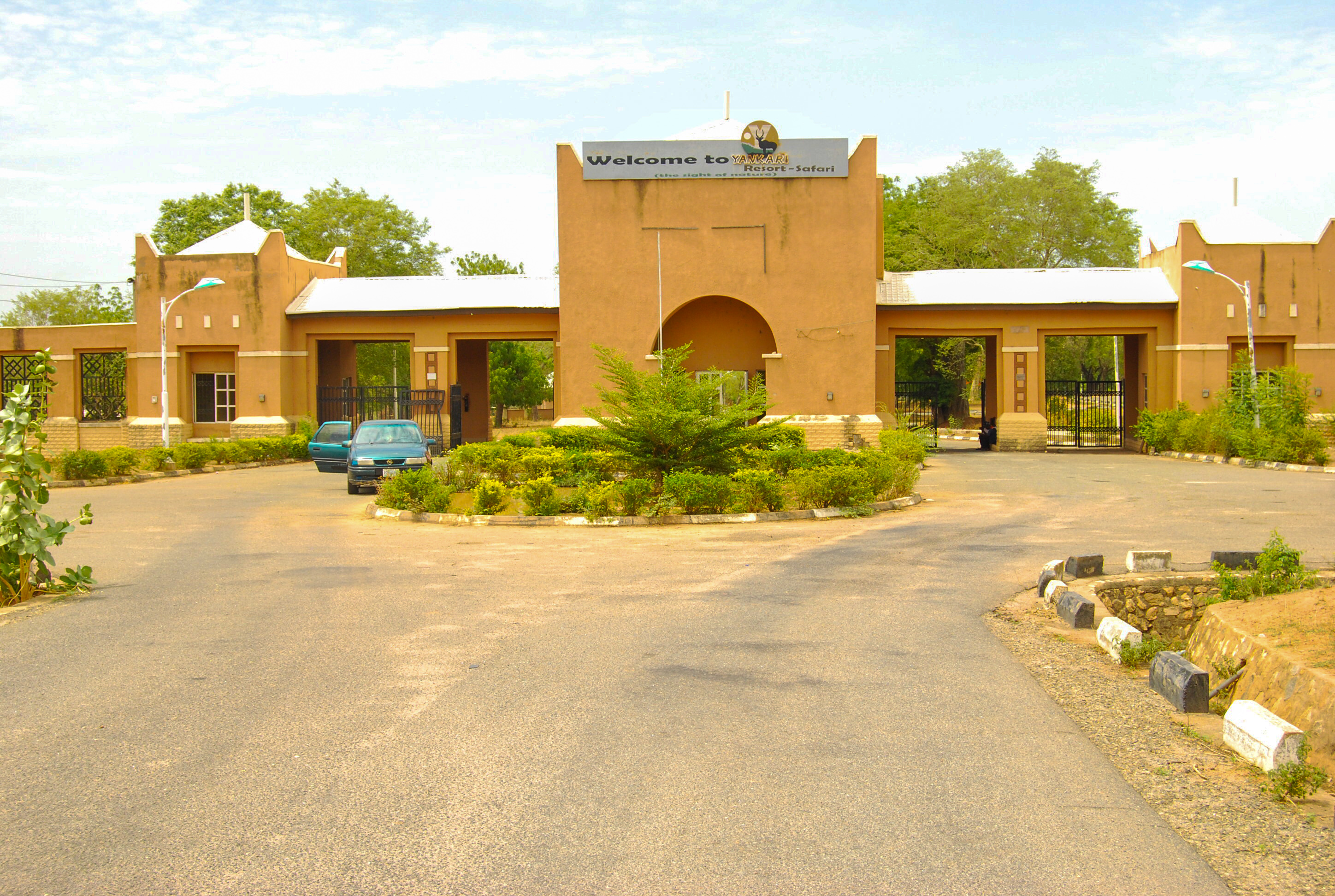
- Yankari Game Reserve Entry Gate

- Location within Nigeria
- Location: Bauchi State, Nigeria
- Nearest city: Bauchi
- Coordinates: 9°45′16″N 10°30′37″E
- Area: 2,244 km^{2} (866 sq mi)
- Established: 1962
- Visitors: 20,000 (in 2000)
- Governing body: Bauchi State Government
- Website: yankarigamereserve.com.ng

Yankari Game Reserve is a large wildlife park and former National Park located in the south-central part of Bauchi State, in northeastern Nigeria. It covers an area of about 2,244 km^{2} (866 sq mi) and is home to several natural warm water springs, as well as a wide variety of flora and fauna. Its location in the heartland of the West African savanna makes it a unique way for tourists to watch wildlife in its natural habitat. Yankari was created as a game reserve in 1956, but later designated Nigeria's biggest national park in 1991. It is the most popular destination for tourists in Nigeria and plays a crucial role in the development and promotion of tourism and ecotourism in Nigeria. It is also a popular eco-destination in West Africa.

== History ==
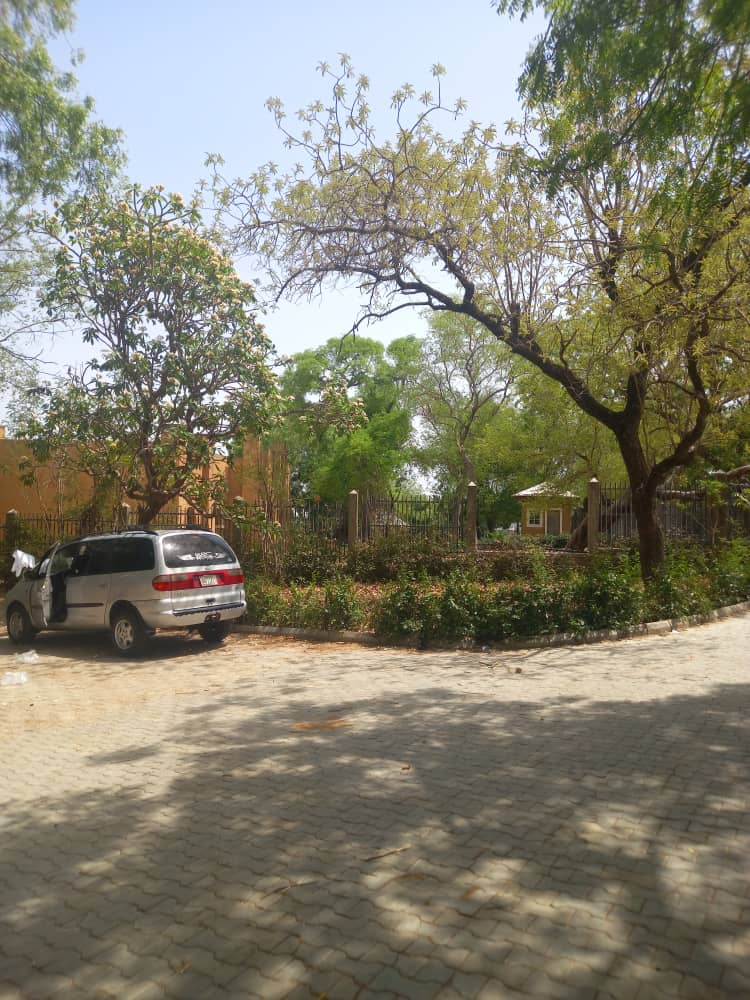
Yankari game reserve

The open country and villages that surround Yankari National Park are populated by farmers and herders, but there has been no human settlement in the park for over a century. There is, however, evidence of earlier human habitation in the park, including old iron smelting sites and caves. The furnaces have been damaged by centuries of exposure to the elements, though by the late 1990s there were more than fifty surviving in the Delimiri and Ampara area. In 1934, the Northern Regional Committee made a recommendation to the Executive Council to establish a pilot game reserve in the Bauchi Emirate. This was supported by Alhaji Muhammadu Ngeleruma, a minister in the former northern Nigeria Ministry of Agriculture and Natural Resources. Around this time, he had been impressed by a visit to a Sudanese game reserve while on a trip to East Africa. On returning, he encouraged the moves to establish something similar in Nigeria.

In 1956, the Northern Nigeria Government approved the plans for the creation of a Game Preservation area. Yankari was identified as a region in the south of what was then Bauchi Province where large numbers of wild animals existed naturally and could be protected. In 1957 a Game Preservation area was carved out and the area was constituted as a Bauchi Native Authority Forest Reserve. Yankari was first opened to the public as a premier game reserve on 1 December 1962. Since then, the Northern Eastern State Government and then the Bauchi State Government both managed the Yankari Game Reserve. The park is now managed by the Federal Government of Nigeria, through the National Park Service.

In 1991, it officially became a National Park by decree 36 of the National Government. In the late 1900s, the park management began a preservation project for the archaeological sites within the park to encourage heritage tourism.

In 2006, Yankari lost its status as a National Park following a request of the Bauchi State Government.

== Wildlife ==
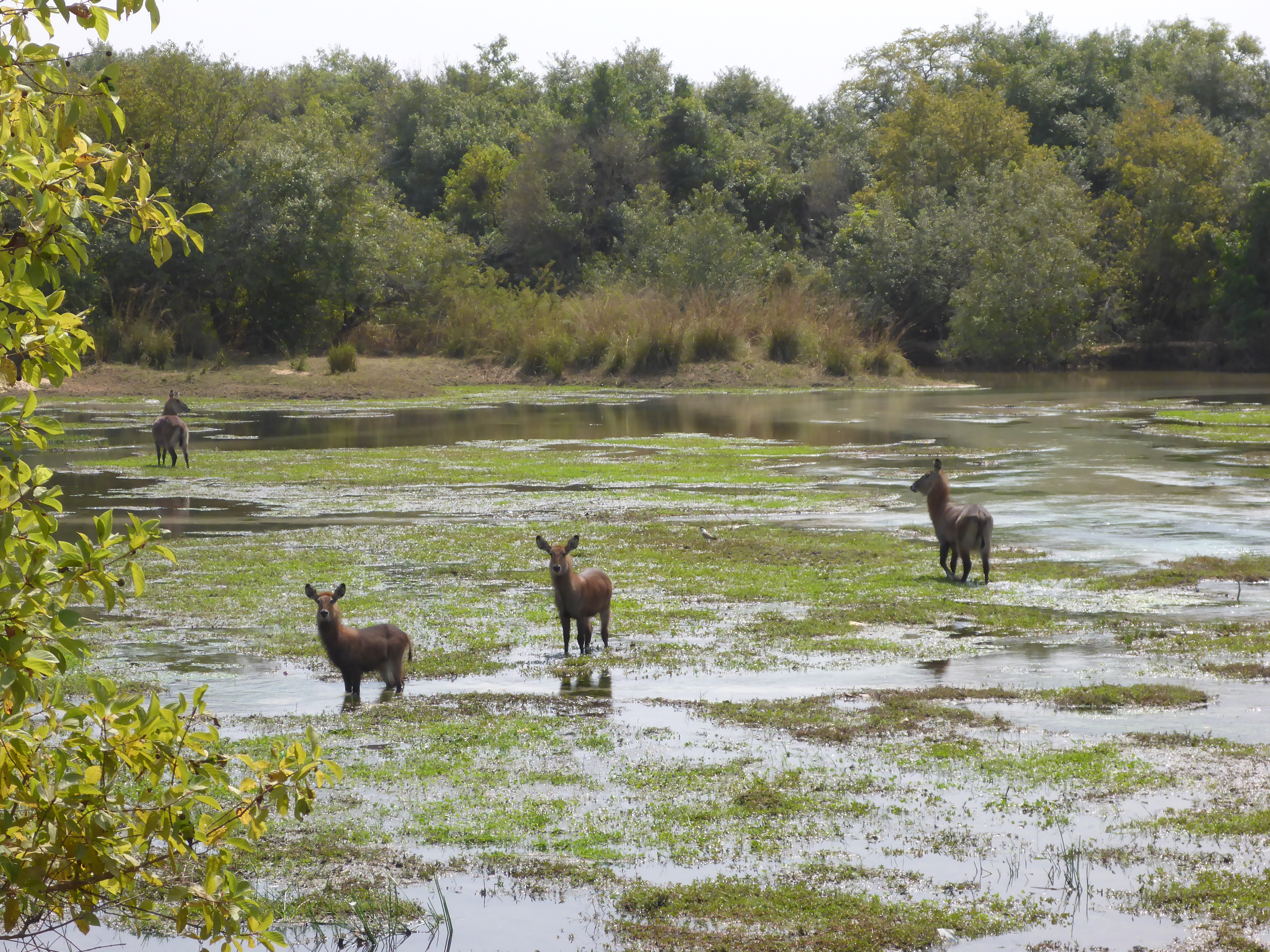
Water buck (Kobus ellipsiprymnus) in Yankari Game Reserve

Yankari Game Reserve is an important refuge for over 50 mammal species including African bush elephant, olive baboon, patas monkey, Tantalus monkey, roan antelope, hartebeest, lion, African buffalo, waterbuck, bushbuck and hippopotamus. The lion population is on the verge of extinction. There are also over 350 species of bird found in the park. Of these, 130 are residents, 50 are Palearctic migrants and the rest are intra-African migrants that move locally within Nigeria. These birds include the saddle-billed stork, Helmeted guineafowl, African grey hornbill, and the cattle egret.

Since 2005, the protected area is considered a Lion Conservation Unit together with Kainji National Park.

== Climate ==
Between May and September is the rainy season. Temperatures range from 18 °C (64 °F) to 35 °C (95 °F). During the dry season, the harmattan wind blows from the Sahara, often bringing dusty skies, and night temperatures fall as low as 12 °C (54 °F). The hottest period falls in March and April, when temperatures can rise above 40 °C (104 °F) during the daytime.

== Geology ==
The entire park is based on the Tertiary-aged Kerri Formation, which is made of sandstone, siltstones, kaolinites, and grits. Under this lies the Gombe development, of Cretaceous age, made out of sandstones, sediment stones, and ironstones. The valleys of the Gaji, Yashi and Yuli Streams are loaded up with Alluvium of later age. Sandy advances and clayey soils of riverine alluvium happen in the valley of the Gaji Yashi and Yuli Streams. East of the Gaji valley is a 5–7 km (3.1–4.3 mi) wide band of extremely unfortunate sandy soils that help a bush savanna development.

== See also ==
- Sumu Wildlife Park
