= Shiki language =

Bantu language of Nigeria

Shiki
- Gubi
- Native to: Nigeria
- Region: Bauchi State
- Native speakers: 1,200 (2006)
- Language family: Niger–Congo?: Atlantic–Congo; Volta-Congo; Benue–Congo; Bantoid; Southern Bantoid; Jarawan; Nigerian Jarawan; Jaku–Gubi; Shiki

Language codes
- ISO 639-3: gua
- Glottolog: shik1242
- ELP: Shiki

Shiki, or Gubi, is one of the Jarawan languages of Nigeria, spoken in Bauchi State.
