= Mbula-Bwazza language =

Bantu language spoken in Nigeria

Mbula-Bwazza
- Ɓwázà
- Native to: Nigeria
- Region: Adamawa State
- Native speakers: 100,000 (2012)
- Language family: Niger–Congo?: Atlantic–Congo; Volta-Congo; Benue–Congo; Bantoid; Southern Bantoid; Jarawan; Nigerian Jarawan; Numan; Mbula-Bwazza
- Dialects: Bwazza; Mbula; Tambo; Kula; Gwamba

Language codes
- ISO 639-3: mbu
- Glottolog: mbul1260

Ɓwaza
- Person: Ɓwà Ɓwàzà
- People: àɓwàzà
- Language: Ɓwázà

Mbula-Bwazza is one of the jarawan languages spoken in Nigeria. It is a dialect cluster; Blench (2011) divides it into several languages, as follows:

- Bwazza
- Mbula: Mbula, Tambo, Kula, Gwamba
