= Labir language =

Bantu language spoken in Nigeria

Labir
- Jaku
- Native to: Nigeria
- Region: Bauchi State
- Ethnicity: 13,000 (2006)
- Native speakers: 500 (2008)
- Language family: Niger–Congo?: Atlantic–Congo; Volta-Congo; Benue–Congo; Bantoid; Southern Bantoid; Jarawan; Nigerian Jarawan; Jaku–Gubi; Labir

Language codes
- ISO 639-3: jku
- Glottolog: labi1245
- ELP: Labir

láɓír
- Person: màn láɓír
- People: ɓúmàn láɓír
- Language: láɓír

ʤàkú
- Person: màn ʤàkú
- People: ɓúmàn ʤàkú
- Language: ʤàkú

Labir (also Labɨr, Lábír, Láɓír, or Láɓɨ́r), or Jaku, is one of the Jarawan languages of Nigeria, spoken in Bauchi State. Jaku (ʤàkú) is an exonym.

== Background ==
Labɨr is spoken in Alkaleri LGA (in 13 villages) and Bauchi LGA (in 8 villages), Bauchi State, Nigeria. There are 24 villages total according to the Labɨr.

The villages are:

Alkaleri LGA:

- Kyaabi
- Ryaŋga I
- Gyar I
- Kaciciya
- Dooka
- Kyau gani
- Fanti
- Gar
- Monna
- Bada koshi
- Badol
- Kyenda

Bauchi LGA:

- Kaŋyelo
- Ŋgikan
- Ŋgimanu
- Ɓajang
- Ɓalaŋsi
- Gyar II
- Ryaŋga II
- Kyenda
- Basa

Labɨr speakers are approximately 60% Muslim and 40% Christian. It is more commonly spoken by Christians, since Muslims tend to speak Hausa. Only about 10% of all ethnic Jaku people can speak the language.

== Phonology ==
Labɨr has three level tones, as well as rising and falling tones.
