= Mama language =

Bantu language spoken in Nigeria

Mama
- Kantana
- Native to: Nigeria
- Region: Nassarawa State
- Native speakers: (2,000–3,000? cited 2001)
- Language family: Niger–Congo?: Atlantic–Congo; Volta-Congo; Benue–Congo; Bantoid; Southern Bantoid; Jarawan; Nigerian Jarawan; Mama

Language codes
- ISO 639-3: mma
- Glottolog: mama1272

Mama, or Kantana, is a Jarawan language spoken in Nigeria.

The number of speakers is unclear. A figure of 20,000 was published in 1973. In 2011, "Kantana" (presumably the same language) was said to have 2,000–3,000 speakers, mostly over 25 years old. A partial count of the ethnic community in the 2006 census was 6,000–9,000.
