= List of Bantu languages =

List of languages

Bantu
- Narrow Bantu
- Geographic distribution: Africa, from approximately the equator south
- Linguistic classification: Niger–Congo?: Atlantic–Congo; Benue–Congo; Southern Bantoid; Bantu
- Subdivisions: Zones A–S (geographic)

Language codes
- Glottolog: narr1281
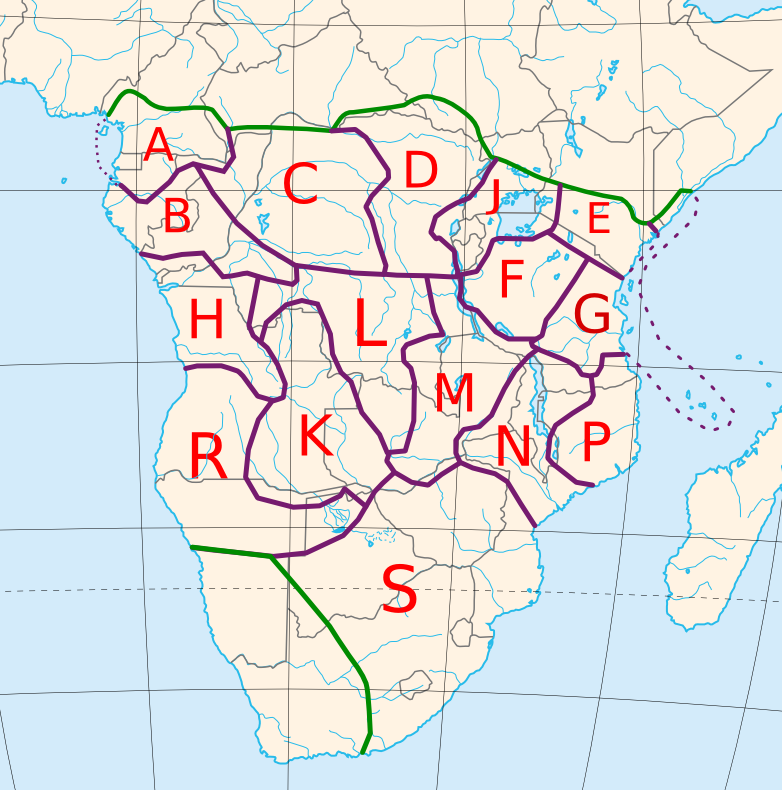
- The approximate locations of the sixteen Guthrie Bantu zones, including the addition of a zone J

Following is a list of Bantu languages as interpreted by Harald Hammarström, and following the Guthrie classification.

Group	Guthrie code	ISO code	Languages	References
A10: Lundu-Balong group	A11	bdu	Batanga (Lotanga, Dotanga, A113), Bima (A112), Koko (Lokoko), Londo ba Diko (A115), Londo (Murundo), Balondo Ba Nanga), Longolo (Ngolo, A111), Lundu, Oroko (A101), Oroko-East, Oroko-West	Kuperus 1985: 17-18
A10: Lundu-Balong group	A12	bdu	Lolue (Barue, Babue, Lue, Balue), Bakundu (A122, Lokundu, Bekunde, Kundu, Nkundu, Lakundu), Western Kundu, Bakundu-Balue, Ekombe (Bekombo, Ekumbe), Mbonge (A121, Mbε)	Atta Ebongkome 1993
A10: Lundu-Balong group	A13	bwt	“Bafaw” (A141, Bafo, Lefo,’Afo), Bafaw-Balong, Balúun, Balong, Ngoe	Hedinger 1987
A10: Lundu-Balong group	A14	bvg	Bongken (Bonkeng, Bonkeng-Pendia, Bonkenge)	Hedinger 1987: 132-164
A10: Lundu-Balong group	A15A	mbo	Mbo of Ekanang-Mbouroukou (A15, Mbo of Ekanang-Mbouroukou), Mbo of Mboebo-Kekem (Mbo of Mboébo-Kekem), Mbo of Ngwatta, Mbo, Mbo’o (Mboo), Nlaa Mboo, Nle Mbuu, Melon (Melong, Eho Mbo), Sambo, Santchou, North Eastern Manenguba	Hedinger 1987
A10: Lundu-Balong group	A15B	bsi	Mienge (A15, Lower Mbo), Asobse, Bassossi (Nsose, Nswose, Nswase, Swose, Sosi), North-western Manenguba	Hedinger 1987
A10: Lundu-Balong group	A15C	bqz	Babong (Ihobe Mbog, Ihobe Mboong), Bafun (Mbwase Nghuy, Miamilo, Pendia), Bakaka (Ehob Mkaa, Mkaa,’ Kaa, Kaka), Balondo (Ehobe Belon), Baneka (Mwaneka), Manehas (Mvae, Mwahed, Mwahet), Ngoten, Eastern Central Manenguba	Hedinger 1987
A10: Lundu-Balong group	A15	bss	Akoose (Akosi, Bakossi, Bekoose, Koose, Kosi, Nkoosi, Nkosi), Elung (Along, Elong, Nlong), Mwambong, Mwamenam (Mouamenam), Ninong (Nninong), Northern Bakossi, Southern Bakossi, Western Bakossi, Nhalemoe, Western Central Manenguba	Hedinger 1987
A10: Lundu-Balong group	A151	nkc	Kinkwa, Nkongho (Lekongo)	Hedinger 1987
A20: Duala group	A21	bqm	Bamboko (Bambuku, Mboko, Womboko, Wumboko)	Ebobissé 2014
A20: Duala group	A22	bri	Bakpwe (Kpe, Mokpe, Mopkwe), Bakueri (Vakweli, Bakwedi, Bakwele, Bakweri, Bakwiri, Bekwiri, Kwedi, Kweli, Kwili, Kwiri), Ujuwa, Vambeng	Ebobissé 2014
A20: Duala group	A221	bbx	Bobe (A221), Bubia (Bobea, Wovea, Wuvia)	Ebobissé 2014
A20: Duala group	A23	szv	Isu (Isu of Fako Division, Isubu, Isuwu, Su, Subu), Bimbia	Ebobissé 2014
A20: Duala group	A231	kme	Kole (Bakole, Bakolle)	Ebobissé 2014
A20: Duala group	A24	dua	Duala (Diwala, Douala, Dualla, Dwala, Dwela), Mongo (A261, Mungo, Mungu, Muungo), Pongo (A26)	Ebobissé 2014
A20: Duala group	A25	-	Ewodi (Oli, Wuri, Ouri, Wuri, Uli, Wouri), Bodiman (Bidiman, Budiman)	Ebobissé 2014
A20: Duala group	A27	mzd	Malimba (Lemba, Limba, Mudima, Mulimba)	Lamberty 2009
A30: Bubi-Benga group	A31	bvb	Bobe (Boobe, Boombe, Bube, Bubi), Adeeyah (Adija, Ediya), Banapa (Banapá), Banni, North Bobe, Southeast Bobe, Southwest Bobe, Ureka	Tessmann 1923
A30: Bubi-Benga group	A32	bnm	Batanga (Batanga at Fifinda, Tanga, A32C), Balangi of Great Batanga, Bano’o (Bano’o, Banoho, Banoo, Noho, Nohu, Noko, A32a, Noku), Bapoko (Bapuku, Bapuu, Poko, Puku, A32B)	Ebobissé 2014
A30: Bubi-Benga group	A33a	yko	Yasa (Iyasa, Iyassa, Lyaasa, Yassa)	Ebobissé 2014
A30: Bubi-Benga group	A33b	nui	Kombe (Combe, Kombe, Ngumbi)	Fernandez Galilea 1951
A30: Bubi-Benga group	A34	bng	Benga, Boumba, Ndowe	Idiata 2007; Salvadó y Cos 1891
A40	A41	bbi	Balombi (Barombi, Barumbi, Lambi, Lombe, Lombi, Rambi, Rombi)	Lamberty 2002
A40	A42	abb	Abaw (Abo, Bo, Bon), Bankon (Bankong, Mankon)	Lamberty 2002
A40	A43a	bas	Basa (Basaa, Bassa, Basso, Bisaa, Mbele (Mvele), Mbene, South Kogo (A43c)	Bitjaa Kody 1988
A40	A43b	bkh	Bakoko (Kogo, A43c), Adie (Basoo Ba Die, Basoo D’edea, Elog Mpoo), Adiangok), Mbang (Dimbambang), Yabyang (Yabyang-Yapeke), Yakalak (Yakalag), Yapoma, Yassuku (Yasoukou, Yasuku, Yasug)	Dodo-Bounguendza 1988
A40	A44	tvu	Nen (Banen, Tunen), Aling’a (A441, Alinga, Tuling, Eling)	Mous and Breedveld 1986
A40	A45	nvo	Nyo’o (Nyõ’õ, Nyo’on, Nyokon, Njokon), Fung (Hung)	Mous and Breedveld 1986
A40	A46	lem	Lemande (Mande, Mandi, Nomaande, Noomaante, Numaand, Numand)	Mous and Breedveld 1986
A40	A461	ttf	Bonek (Ponek), Otomb (Tuotom, Tuotomb, Tuotomp)	Mous and Breedveld 1986
A40	A462	yat	Yambeta (Yambetta)	Mous and Breedveld 1986
A50: Bafia group	A501	hij	Hijuk	Bradley 1992a
A50: Bafia group	A51	lfa	Lefa’ (Fak, Lefa, Fa’), Balom	Mbongue 1999
A50: Bafia group	A52	dii	Kaalong (Kalong, Lakaalong), Lambong (Mbong, Bumbong, Dimbong)	Dieu and Renaud 1983
A50: Bafia group	A53	ksf	Kpa (Bekpak, Rikpa’), Bafia	Guarisma 2000
A50: Bafia group	A54	ngy	Tibea, (Zangnte, Djanti, Njanti, Minjanti), Ngayaba	Bradley 1992b
A60	A601	bag	Tuki (Baki, Ki, Oki), Tiki, Bacenga (A601F, A64, Batchenga, Tocenga, Cenga), Mbere (A601G, Mvele, Tumbele, Bamvele, Bambele, Mbele), Ngoro (A601A, A61, Tu Ngoro), Aki, Uki, Cangu (A601B, Tucangu), Kombe (A601C, Wakombe, Tukombe, Bakombe), Tsinga (A601D, Tutsingo, Chinga, Betsinga, Betzinga, Tsingo, Batsingo), Tonjo (A601E, Bondjou, Bounjou, Bunju, Bounjou)	Biloa 2013
A60	A62A	yav	Yangben, Central Yambassa, Kalong (Nukalonge)	Paulian 1986
A60	A62B	mmu	Mmaala (Mmala, Numaala)	Paulian 1986
A60	A62C	ekm	Elip (Belibi, Belip, Libie, Nulibie (A62C, Nulibié), Nulipie)	Paulian 1986
A60	A621	baf	Baca (Nu Baca, Nubaca), Southern Yambassa	Paulian 1986
A60	A622	yas	Gounou (Gunu, Nu Gunu, Nugunu), Gunu Nord, Gunu SudNugunu	Paulian 1986
A60	A623	mlb	Mbule (Dumbule, Mbola, Mbule of Cameroon, Mbure)	Boone 1992
A60	A63	leo	Leti (A63)	Dieu and Renaud 1983; Biloa 2013: 37-38
A60	A65	btc	Bati (Bati Ba Ngong, Bati de Brousse, Pati)	Grant 1992
A70	A71	eto/mct	Eton (Iton), Northern Eton (Iton Ekwe, Lower Eton), Southern Eton (Upper Eton, Iton Nke), Mengisa (Mengissa)	van de Velde 2008; Geslin-Houdet 1984
A70	A72(a)	ewo	Ewondo (Ewundu), Badjia (A72c, Bakjo, Bakja), Bafeuk, Yesoum (Yezum, Yesum), Fok (Fök, Fong), Jaunde (Yaounde, Yaunde), Mvete (A72b, Mvele, Mwele), Mvog-Niengue, Omvang, Yabeka, Yabekanga, Yabekolo (Yebekolo), Yangafek (A72d), Evuzok, Bané	Essono 2000
A70	A73a	beb	Bamvele (Bebele, Bembele), Eki, Manyok	Djomeni 2014
A70	A73b	bxp	Gbigbil, Bobili	Wega Simeu 2004b; Dugast 1949: 88-89
A70	A74	bum	Bulu (A74a, Boulou, Bulu), Bene (A74b)	Alexandre and Binet 1958
A70	A75	fan	Fang (Fan), Pangwe, Pahouin, Atsi (Batsi, A75D), Make (Meke, A75C), Mveny (A75F), Ntum (Ntumu, A75A), Nzaman (Zaman, A75E), Okak (A75B), South-West Fang (A751)	Alexandre and Binet 1958; Andeme Allogo 1985; Wilson 1849; Alexandre 1965
A80	A801	gyi	Bagielli (Bagiele, Bagyele, Bagyeli, Bajele, Bajeli, Bogyel, Bogyeli, Bondjiel, Giele, Gieli, Gyele, Gyeli, Gélé), Bapindi, Bakola	Rénaud 1976
A80	A802	ukh	Ukhwejo (Ukwedjo)	Thornell 2009
A80	A803	-	Shiwa (Swa, Shiwe, Oshieba), “Fang Makina”	Idiata 2007
A80	A81	nmg	Kwasio, Mabea (Mabi, Magbea), Mvumbo, Ngoumba (Ngumba), Bujeba	Echegaray 1960
A80	A82	sox	So (Emvane So, Melan So, Shwo, Sô, Sso)	Bradley and Bradley 1992
A80	A83	mcp	Makaa (Mekaa), South Makaa (South Mekaa), Bebend (A83A, Bebent), Mbwaanz (A83B), (A831), Sekunda (A83C, Shekunda, Shikunda	Cheucle 2014
A80	A831	mkk	Byep, North Makaa, Maka (Makya, Meka, Mekae, Mekay, Mekey, Mekye, Mika, Moka)	Etter 1988
A80	A832	biw	Kol (Bekol, Bikele, Bikele-Bikay, Bikele-Bikeng, Bikeng, Bokol), Kol North, Kol South	Henson 2007
A80	A84	njy	Njyem (Djem, Dzem, Ndjem, Ndjeme, Ndzem, Ngyeme, Njem, Njeme, Nyem)	Cheucle 2014
A80	A842	ozm	Koonzime (Koozhime, Koozime, Nzime, Zimu, Djimu, Dzimou, Kooncimo), Badwe’e (A841, Bajwe’e, Badjoue, Bajue, Badwe’e)	Cheucle 2014
A80	A85	bkw	Bekwel (A85b, Bakouli, Bakwel, Bakwele, Bakwil, Bekwil), Konabem (A85a, Nkumabem, Nkonabeeb, Konabem, Kunabeeb, Konabembe, Kunabembe)	Beavon and Johnson 2011
A80	A86b	mgg	Mpompon (Mpongmpong, Mpopo, Mpumpoo, Pongpong, Bombo, Mbombo, Mpompo), Bageto (Northern Bangantu, Baagato, Bangantu), Medjime (A86a, Menzime, Mendzime, Medzime, Mezime), Mpomam (Boman, Mboman)	Johnson and Beavon 1989
A80	A86c	mcx	Mpiemo (Bimu, Mbimou, Mbimu, Mbyemo, Mpyemo), Bidjuki (Bidjouki)	Thornell 2004
A80	A87	bmw	Bomali (Bomwali, Boumali, Boumoali, Bumali), Lino, Sangasanga (Sangha-Sangha, Sanghasangha)	Bruel 1911
A80	-	-	Klieman 1997	Köhler 1964
A90: Kaka group	A91	kwu	Abakoum (Abakum, Akpwakum, Bakum, Kpakum, Kum/Bakum, Kwakum, Pakum), Til, Bheten, Baki	Belliard 2007
A90: Kaka group	A92	pmm	Pol (A92a, Polri, Pori), Kinda Pol, Asum Pol, Pomo (A92b), Boungondjo, Kweso (A92C)	Ballif 1977; Wega Simeu 2012
A90: Kaka group	A93	kkj	Kako (Bokaka, Kaka, Kaka-Kadei, Mkako), Kako du Gabon	Medjo Mvé 2009
B10: Myene group	B11	mye	Myene (Omyene), Adjumba (B11d, Ajumba, Adyumba, Dyumba), Enenga (B11F), Galwa (B11c, Galua, Galloa, Galoa), Mpongwe (Npongué, Mpongwé, Npongwe, Pongoué, B11a, Mpongoué, Mpungwe), Nkomi (N’komi, B11e), Orungu (B11b, Rungu, Rongo)	Jacquot 1983
B20: Kele group	B201	nda	Ndasa (Ndasha, Andasa, Undaza)	Alewijnse et al. 2007; Idiata 2007
B20: Kele group	B202	sxe	Sighu (Sigu, Lesighu, Lisighu, Lisiwu)	Alewijnse et al. 2007; Idiata 2007
B20: Kele group	B203	syx	Osamayi (Sama, Samay, Samaye, Shamay, Shamaye, Shamayi)	Matimi 1998; Alewijnse et al. 2007; Idiata 2007
B20: Kele group	B204	nxo	Ndambomo (Ndambono)	Mvé 2013
B20: Kele group	B21	syi	Seki (Baseque, Seke, Seki-ani, Baseke, Sekiana, Sekiani, Sekiyani, Sekyani, Seseki, Sheke, Shekiyana), Bulu	Alewijnse et al. 2007; Echegaray 1959a; Idiata 2007
B20: Kele group	B211	bxc	Molengue (Alengue, Alengué, Balengue) Alengue (Alengué), Balengue, Molendji, Molengue	Echegaray 1959b; de Granda Gutiérrez 1984
B20: Kele group	B22a	keb	Kele (Akele, Kélé, Dikele, Kili), Metombolo (B205, Metombola), Western Kele	Alewijnse et al. 2007; Idiata 2007
B20: Kele group	B22b	nra	Angom (Ngom, Ongom, Ungom, Ngomo, Bangom, Bangomo), Bakoya variant of Bungom	Alewijnse et al. 2007; Idiata 2007; Medjo Mvé no date; Medjo Mvé 2011
B20: Kele group	B22c	see B305		
B20: Kele group	B22D	-	Tombidi (Muntumbudie, Ntumbidi, Tumbidi)	Idiata 2007; Alewijnse et al. 2007
B20: Kele group	B22E	-	Mwesa (Mesa, Yesa)	Alewijnse et al. 2007; Idiata 2007
B20: Kele group	B23	zmn	Mbangwe, Mbaouin (M’Bahouin)	Alewijnse et al. 2007; Idiata 2007
B20: Kele group	B24	wum	Wumbu (Wumbvu, Wumvu)	Alewijnse et al. 2007; Idiata 2007
B20: Kele group	B25	koq	Kota (Ikota, Ikuta, Kotu)	Alewijnse et al. 2007; Idiata 2007
B20: Kele group	B251	sak	Asake (Sake, Shake)	Alewijnse et al. 2007; Idiata 2007
B20: Kele group	B252	mhb	Mahongwe	Alewijnse et al. 2007; Idiata 2007
B30: Tsogo group	B301	gev	Viya (Avija, Evia, Eviya, Gevia, Geviya, Ia (γe-βia), Ivea, Ivéa)	Idiata 2007; Alewijnse et al. 2007
B30: Tsogo group	B302	sbw	Simba (E-Himba, γe-himba, Gehimba, Ghehimba, Ghehimbaka, Himba, Himbaka)	Alewijnse et al. 2007; Idiata 2007; 2007
B30: Tsogo group	B304	pic	Pinzi (Apindje, Apindji, Apindzi, Apingi, Apinji, E-Pinzi (γe-pinzi), Gapinji, Ghepinzi, Pindji, Pinji)	Alewijnse et al. 2007; Idiata 2007
B30: Tsogo group	B305	buw	Vove (B22C, Mpovi, Ge-Vove, Gevove, Ghevove, Pove), “Bubi” (Bhubhi, Ibhubhi, Ibubi, Pubi)	Alewijnse et al. 2007; Idiata 2007
B30: Tsogo group	B31	tsv	Tsogo (Getsogo, Ghetsogo, Itsogho, Mitsogo, γe-tsγ), Babongo-Tsogo (B303, Ebongwe, Bongwe of Raponda-Walker, Ebongo)	Idiata 2007; Raponda Walker 1937
B30: Tsogo group	B32	kbs	Kande (Kanda, O-Kande, Okande)	Alewijnse et al. 2007; Idiata 2007
B40: Shira-Punu group	B401	bwz	Bwisi (I-Bwisi, Ibwiisi, Ibwisi, Mbwisi)	Jacquot 1978; Bastin et al. 1999; Yenguitta 1991
B40: Shira-Punu group	B402	bbg	Barama (γi-βarama, Bavarama, Ghibarama, Gibarama, Givarama, Varama), Bwali (B411)	Idiata 2007; Alewijnse et al. 2007; Bastin et al. 1999
B40: Shira-Punu group	B403	vum	Vungu (Givoungou, Vumbu, Vungu, Givungu), Yivoumbou	Idiata 2007
B40: Shira-Punu group	B404	-	Ngubi (Ngove)	Idiata 2007; Puèch 1988; Aleko and Puèch 1988; Agadji Ayele 2002: 79-83
B40: Shira-Punu group	B41	swj	Shira (Eshira, Ashira, Gisir, Gisira, Ichira, Ishira, Isira, Shire, Sira, Yichira)	Alewijnse et al. 2007; Idiata 2007
B40: Shira-Punu group	B42	snq	Sangu (Ashango, Chango, I-Sangu, Isangu, Massangu, Shango, Yisangou, Yisangu), Babongo-Sangu	Alewijnse et al. 2007; Idiata 2007; Bonhomme et al. 2012
B40: Shira-Punu group	B43	puu	Punu (Ipunu, Pouno, Pounou, Puno, Punu, Yipounou, Yipunu), Babongo-Rimba	Alewijnse et al. 2007; Andersson 1983; Idiata 2007
B40: Shira-Punu group	B44	lup	Lumbu (Baloumbou, Ilumbu, Lumbu, Yilumbu), Igama	Alewijnse et al. 2007; Idiata 2007; Klieman 2003
B50: Nzebi group	B501	wdd	Wanzi (Bawandji, Liwanzi, Wandji)	Alewijnse et al. 2007; Idiata 2007
B50: Nzebi group	B503	-	Vili (Ivili, Bavili de la Ngouié)	Alewijnse et al. 2007; Idiata 2007
B50: Nzebi group	B51	dma	Duma (Adouma, Aduma, Liduma, Badouma, Douma)	Alewijnse et al. 2007; Idiata 2007
B50: Nzebi group	B52	nzb	Njebi (Injebi, Inzebi, Bandzabi, Ndjabi, Ndjevi, Njabi, Njavi, Nzebi, Yinjebi, Yinzebi), Ibongo-Nzebi, Yangho (B603)	Alewijnse et al. 2007; Mouele 1997; Klieman 2003; Idiata 2007
B50: Nzebi group	B53	tsa	Tsaangi (Icaangi, Itsangi, Itsengi, Tcengui, Tchangui, Tsaangi, Tseengi, Tsengi), Mwele (B502)	Idiata 2007; Mouele 1997
B60: Mbete group	B602	kzo	Bakanike (Bakaningi, Likaningi, Kaningi, Lekaningi)	Alewijnse et al. 2007; Idiata 2007
B60: Mbete group	B61	mdt	Mbete (Limbede, Mbede, Mbédé, Mbere, Mbété), Nkomo-Kelle, Nkomo-Ololi, Obaa, Oyuomi Mbama, Oyuomi Tcherre, Yaba-Mbeti	Idiata 2007; Lane 1989
B60: Mbete group	B62	mbm	Mbaama (B601, Obamba, Ombamba, Lembaama, Lembaamba, Lim-Bamba, M-Bamba, Mbama, Mbamba), Liweme, Sibiti, Mpini, Ndouba, Obeli, Oyabi	Idiata 2007; Lane 1989
B60: Mbete group	B63	nmd	Dumu (Ondoumbo, Ondumbo, Lindumu, Mindoumou, Mindumbu, Minduumo, Lendumu, Ndumu, Ndumbo, Ndumbu, Ndumu, Nduumo, Bandoumou, Doumbou, Dumbu), Epigi, Kanandjoho, Kuya, Nyani (Nyangi)	Idiata 2007; Lane 1989
B70: Teke group	B701	tck	Tsitsege (Latsitsege, Lintsitsege, Tchitchege)	Alewijnse et al. 2007; Idiata 2007
B70: Teke group	B71	teg	Teghe (Tege, Iteghe, Latege) Keteghe (Kali, B71A, Ketego), Katege (B71B, Kateghe, Njining’i, Nzikini), Teke of Gabon, Teke of the Upper Alima	Adam 1954
B70: Teke group	B72	ngz	Northeastern Teke, Engungwel (B72a, Ngungwel, Ngangoulou, Ngangulu, Ngungulu), Mpu (Mpumpum), Mpumpu, B72b)	Rurangwa 1982; Bouka 1989b
B70: Teke group	B73a	tyi	Tsaayi (Caayi, Getsaayi, Tsaya, Tsaye, Tsayi)	Jacquot 1978
B70: Teke group	B73b	lli	Laali (Gibongo-Ilaali, Ilaali)	Klieman 1997; Bouka 1989b
B70: Teke group	B73c	iyx	Yaa (Bayaka, Iyaka, Yaka, Ibongo-Iyaa)	Mouandza (2002) Klieman 1997; Bouka 1989b
B70: Teke group	B73d	tyx	Tyee (Tye, Tee, Teke-Tyee), Kwe	Bouka 1989b; Nkara 2007
B70: Teke group	B74	ebo/nzu	Central Teke, Teke-Eboo (B74b, Boma, Babuma, Bamboma, Boo, Boõ, Eboom, Iboo), Nzikou (B74a, Ndzindziu, Njiunjiu, Njyunjyu, Nzinzu, Enjyunjyu)	Raharimanantsoa 2012; Nsuka Nkutsi 1990
B70: Teke group	B75–6	tek	Bali (Ambali, Ibali Teke, Ibali), Kiteke (B76, East Teke, Mosieno, Ng’ee, Bamfunuka), Nunu (B822, B80Nu)	Sims 1886: i-xii Bastin 1978; Boone 1973: 295-306; Bastin et al. 1999
B70: Teke group	B77a	kkw	Kukuya (Chikuya, Cikuya, Kikuwa, Koukouya, Kukua, Kukuya, Kukwa)	Paulian 1975
B70: Teke group	B77b	ifm	Fumu (Fuumu, Mfumu, Ifuumu, Teke du Pool), Wuumo (B78, Ewuumo, Wũ, Mpuon (Mpuono, B84A), Mpuun (B84B)	Calloc’h 1911; Jacquot 1965; Makouta-Mboukou 1977; Bastin et al. 1999: 13; 183; 193; 202
B80: Tiene-Yanzi	B81	tii	Tiene (Kitiene, Kitiini, Tende, Tiene), Nunu (C31C, Banunu, Kenunu)	Motingea Mangulu 2004; Ellington 1977; Hulstaert 1951: 32-33
B80: Tiene-Yanzi	B82	boh	Boma (Kiboma, Boma Kasai, Buma)	Hochegger 1972
B80: Tiene-Yanzi	B821	-	Mpe (Kempee)	Detienne 1984; Bastin et al. 1999: 202
B80: Tiene-Yanzi	B83	zmf	Mfinu (Funika, Emfinu, Mfununga), Ntsiam, Ntswar	Bostoen and Koni Muluwa 2014; Boone 1973
B80: Tiene-Yanzi	B84	see B77b		
B80: Tiene-Yanzi	B85	yns	Yans (Yanzi), West Yansi (B85a, Mbien), East Yans (B85b), Yeei (B85c)	Mayanga 1985: 1-22; Bostoen and Koni Muluwa 2014
B80: Tiene-Yanzi	B85d	soo	Nsong (Tsong), Mpiin (B863)	Bostoen and Koni Muluwa 2014; Boone 1973
B80: Tiene-Yanzi	B864	noq	Ngongo (Ngong, Ngoongo)	Bostoen and Koni Muluwa 2014; Boone 1973; Torday and Joyce 1907
B80: Tiene-Yanzi	B85F (= L12a)	smx	Ntsambaan (Sambaan)	Bostoen and Koni Muluwa 2014; Boone 1973; Maes 1934
B80: Tiene-Yanzi	B86	diz	Dzing (Di, Din, Ding, Dinga), Mpur (B85e, Mput)	Boone 1973; Muluwa and Bostoen 2015; Mertens 1939
B80: Tiene-Yanzi	B861	nlo	Ngul (Banguli, Ingul, Ngoli, Ngul, Nguli, Ngulu), Ngwi	Maes 1934; Boone 1973; Bostoen and Koni Muluwa 2014
B80: Tiene-Yanzi	B862	-	Lwel (Balori)	Khang Levy 1979; Maes 1934; Koni Muluwa and Bostoen 2011
B80: Tiene-Yanzi	B865	-	Nzadi (Bandjari)	Maes 1934; Crane et al. 2011; Boone 1973
B80: Tiene-Yanzi	B87	zmp	Mbuun (Mbunda, Kimbuun, Gimbunda, Ambuun)	Bostoen and Koni Muluwa 2014; Boone 1973
C10	C101	bvx	Babole (Dibole), Dzeke, Ebambe, Edzama, Kinami, Mossengue, Mounda	Gardner 1990; Leitch 2004
C10	C102	ngd	Ngando (Bagandou, Bangandou, Dingando, Mouna-Bagandou) Bodzanga, Dikota (C103, Kota), Dikuta, Ngando-Kota, Bodzanga	Périquet 1915; Bouquiaux and Thomas 1994; Guillaume and Delobeau 1978
C10	C104	axk	Aka (Yaka, Aka de la Lobaye), Benzele (Bendjelle, Mbenzele), ‘Babinga’	Bruel 1911; Bahuchet 1989
C10	C105	-	Mikaya, Bambengangale, Baluma	Klieman 1997; Thomas and Bahuchet 1991
C10	C11	ndn	Goundi (Gundi, Ingundi, Ngondi, Ngundi)	Ouzilleau 1911; Périquet 1915
C10	C12	bkj	Pande (C12a, Ipande), Bukongo (C12b, Bogongo, Gongo)	Ouzilleau 1911; Bruel 1911; Périquet 1915; Hauser 1954
C10	C13	mdn	Mbati, Isongo (Issongo, Lisongo, Lissongo)	Guillaume and Delobeau 1978; Mbalanga 1996; Bouquiaux and Thomas 1994
C10	C14	zmx	Bomitaba (Mbomotaba), Itanga	Gardner 1990
C10	C143	bok	Bonjo (Mbonzo), Impfondo (C143)	Gardner 1990; Samarin 1984; Hauser 1954
C10	C15	bui	Bongili ([E18], Bongili-Pikounda, Bongiri, Bungili, Bungiri), Inyele (C141), Bondongo (C142)	Motingea Mangulu 2008; Gardner 1990; Hauser 1954
C10	C16	loq	Lobala, Likoka, Tanda	Gardner 1990; Hauser 1954
C10	C16	bkp	Boko (Iboko)	Motingea Mangulu 1996
C10	C161	bml	Bomboli	de Boeck 1948
C10	C162	bzo	Bozaba (Budjaba, Budzaba, Buzaba)	de Boeck 1948
C20: Mboshi	C21 (= C23)	mdu	Mboko (Mboxo, Mbuku), Ngare (Ngáre)	Ndinga Oba 2003
C20: Mboshi	C22	akw	Akwa (Akwá)	Ndinga Oba 2003; Aksenova and Toporova 2002
C20: Mboshi	C24	koh	Koyo (Ekoyo, Kouyou, Koyó)	Ndinga Oba 2003; Poupon 1919
C20: Mboshi	C25	mdw	Mbosi (C25A, Embosi, Mbochi, Mboshi, Mboshe, Mbonzi), Olee (C25B), Ondinga (C25C), Ngolo (C25D), Eboi (C25E)	Fontaney 1989: 87-89; Ndinga Oba 2003
C20: Mboshi	C26	kwc	Kouala (Likouala, Ekwala, Kwala, Likwala, Likwála)	Ndinga Oba 2003
C20: Mboshi	C27	kxx	Kuba (Likuba), Bwenyi (C201, Buegni)	Ndinga Oba 2003; Adoua 1981
C30: Bangi-Ntomba	C302	bzm	Bolondo	de Boeck 1948; Motingea Mangulu 2002: 149-150
C30: Bangi-Ntomba	C31a	biz	Loi (Baloi, Boloi), Makutu, Likila, Mampoko, Mpundza (C36c, Mbudza, Mpundza)	de Boeck 1948; Motingea Mangulu 1996
C30: Bangi-Ntomba	C311	mmz	Mabale (Mabaale, Lomabaale), Mabembe	Motingea Mangulu 1996
C30: Bangi-Ntomba	C312	ndw	Ndobo (Ndoobo)	Motingea Mangulu 1990a; de Boeck 1948
C30: Bangi-Ntomba	C313	-	Litoka	Motingea Mangulu 1996
C30: Bangi-Ntomba	C314	lie	Balobo	de Boeck 1948; Motingea Mangulu 1996
C30: Bangi-Ntomba	C32	bni	Bangi (Bobangi, Bubangi, Lobobangi)	Whitehead 1899
C30: Bangi-Ntomba	C32 (= C38)	mow	Moi (Lemoi, Moyi, Moye), Liku, Rebu	Motingea Mangulu and Biako Montanga Mayika 2016
C30: Bangi-Ntomba	C321	liz	Binza (Libindja, Libinja, Libinza])	van Leynseele 1977; Motingea Mangulu 1996
C30: Bangi-Ntomba	C322	-	Zamba (C322, Dzamba, Jamba)	de Boeck 1948; Kamanda Kola 1991
C30: Bangi-Ntomba	C323	-	Mpama	Motingea Mangulu 1996; Hulstaert 1984
C30: Bangi-Ntomba	C33	szg	Sengele (Kesengele, Sengere)	Hulstaert 1951; Motingea Mangulu 2001
C30: Bangi-Ntomba	C34	skt	Sakata (C34A), Djia (C34B, Dja, Dia, Kidjia, Wadia), Bai (C34C, Kibay, Kibai), Tuku-Ketu-Batow (C34D)	Tylleskär 1987
C30: Bangi-Ntomba	C35a	nto	Ntomba (Lontomba, Luntumba, Ntumba), Sakani (C35C, Lotsakani, Sakanyi)	Mamet 1955; Hulstaert 1993
C30: Bangi-Ntomba	C35b	bli	Bolia (Bulia)	Mamet 1960
C30: Bangi-Ntomba	C36	lse	Lusengo (Losengo), Poto (C36a, Pfoto, Yakata), Mpesa (C36b, Limpesa), Kangana (C36f), Enga (C315, Baenga, Bolombo), Eleku	Motingea Mangulu 2008; Motingea Mangulu 1993a; Motingea Mangulu 1996
C30: Bangi-Ntomba	C36e	bkt	Boloki (Baloki, Boleki, Buluki), Ngala (C36d, Mangala)	Motingea Mangulu 2002; Motingea Mangulu 1996
C30: Bangi-Ntomba	C36g	ndl	Ndolo (Ndoolo), Kula (C415, Likula)	de Boeck 1948; Motingea Mangulu 1996
C30: Bangi-Ntomba	C37	bja	Budja (Buja, Ebudja, Budza, Ebuja, Embudja, Embuja, Limbudza, Mbudja, Mbuza), Bosambi, Mbila, Monzamboli, Yaliambi	Motingea Mangulu 1996
C30: Bangi-Ntomba	C371	tmv	Tembo (Motembo, Litembo) de la Mongala, Motembo des grandes îles du Fleuve, Motembo septentrional (C374, Buja, Babale de Bosô-Njanoa), Kunda (C372, Motembo de Budzala, Motembo de la rivière Mbanga)	Motingea Mangulu 1996
C30: Bangi-Ntomba	C373	-	Egbuta	Motingea Mangulu 2003
C40: Ngombe group	C401	pae	Pagibete (Apagibete, Apagibeti, Apakabeti, Apakibeti, Pagabete)	Boone and Olson 2004; Reeder 1998
C40: Ngombe group	C403	kty	Kango (Bacango, Kango of Bas-Uélé District, Likango)	McMaster 1988; de Calonne-Beaufaict 1912
C40: Ngombe group	C41	ngc	Ngombe (Lingombe), Ngombe of the Congo river (C41A), Ngombe at Bosobolo (C41B, North Ngombe), Ngombe at Libenge (C41C, North-West Ngombe), Binza (C41D, East Ngombe)	Motingea Mangulu 1988; Motingea Mangulu 1996; de Rop 1960; Burssens 1958: 32-36
C40: Ngombe group	C411	bws	Bomboma, Bangiri, Likaw (Likao), Lingundu (Lingonda), Ebuku	de Boeck 1948; Motingea Mangulu 1996
C40: Ngombe group	C412	bmg	Bamwe, Libobi, Lifonga, Likata	de Boeck 1948; Motingea Mangulu 1996
C40: Ngombe group	C413	dzn	Dzando (Djando), Ngiri (C31b)	Hackett and van Bulck 1956: 73-74; de Boeck 1948
C40: Ngombe group	C414	lgz	Gendja (Gendza-Bali, Ligendza, Ligenza)	Motingea Mangulu 2001; Vanhouteghem 1947
C40: Ngombe group	C42	bwl	Bwela (Buela, Ebwela), Doko around Lisala (C301), Lingi	Motingea Mangulu 1996
C40: Ngombe group	C44	bww	Bwa (Boa, Boua, Bobwa, Kibua, Kibwa, Leboale, Libua, Libwali), Yewu (C402), Leangba, Baati (C43A, Bati, Lebaati), Benge (C43B, Libenge, Mobenge), Boganga (C43C, Boyanga), Ligbe (C43D)	Boone and Olson 2004; Motingea Mangulu 2005; Czekanowski 1924; Halkin and Viaene 1911; McMaster 1988; Bostoen and Grégoire 2007
C40: Ngombe group	C441	bbm	Bango (Babango, Mobango, Southwest Bwa	Motingea Mangulu 1995; Motingea Mangulu 1995: 5
C40: Ngombe group	C45	agh	Ngelima (Kingbelima, Bangalema, Bangelima), Beo (C45A, Lebeo), Buru (C45B), Tungu (C45C)	Gérard 1924
C50: Soko-Kele group	C502	-	Elinga (Loselinga)	Motingea Mangulu 1994a
C50: Soko-Kele group	C51	zms	Mbesa ([E18], Mobesa, Mombesa)	Hulstaert 1951; de Boeck 1951
C50: Soko-Kele group	C52	soc	So (Basoko, Eso, Gesogo, Heso, Soa, Losoko)	Czekanowski 1924; Harries 1955; Bastin et al. 1999: 208
C50: Soko-Kele group	C53	pof	Poke (Pfoke, Poke, Puki, Tofoke, Topoke, Tovoke)	Torday and Joyce 1922; Bastin et al. 1999: 208
C50: Soko-Kele group	C54	loo	Lombo (Olombo, Tu-Rumbu, Turumbu, Ulumbu)	Carrington 1947
C50: Soko-Kele group	C55	khy/fom	Kele (Ekele, Lokele, Kili, Likelo, Lokele), Yakusu, Foma (C56, Fuma, Li-Foma, Lofoma)11 Likile (C501)	Carrington 1943; Bastin et al. 1999: 208
C60: Mongo-Nkundo	C61	lol/ymg	Mongo (Lomongo, Bololo, Lolo), Nkundo (Lonkundo, Lokonda, Nkundu, Nkundo-Twa), Bakutu (C61A), Bokote (C61B, Bokote Tswa, Ngata, Wangata), Booli (C61C), Bosaka (C61D, Bolandá), Konda (C61E, Ekonda, Ekonda-Bosanga, Ekonda-Twa), Ekota (C61F), Emoma (C61G), Ikongo (C61H, Lokalo-Lomela), Iyembe (C61I, Iyembe de la Lokolo), Ntomba (C61J, Lionje, Nsongo, Bikoro), Yamongo (C61K), Mbole (C61L, Nkengo, Yenge, Yongo, Bosanga-Mbole, Mangilongo, Lwankamba, Lonkembe, Liinja), Nkole (C61M), South Mongo (C61N, Belo, Bolongo, Acitu, Panga), Yailima (C61O, Yalima, Yajima), Ngombe-Lomela (C61P, Longombe, Ngome à Múná), Kitwa-Inongo, Ndombe Tswa, Nkundo Batswa, Twa of Ekonda, Mpombo (C351, Mpombo), Yamongeri (C36H)13	Engels (1911), Hiernaux et al. (1976), Hulstaert (1948), Hulstaert (1999), Motingea Mangulu (1994b), Müller (1964), Nsenga Diatwa (2009)
C60: Mongo-Nkundo	C611	-	Bafotó, Batswa de l’Equateur	Hulstaert 1978
C60: Mongo-Nkundo	C63	nxd/lal	Bongando (Longandu, Ngando, Ngandu), Lalia (C62)	Hulstaert 1987
C60: Mongo-Nkundo	C70	lal		
C50: Soko-Kele group	C71	hba	Hamba	Kasongo 1993; Labaere and Shango 1989
C50: Soko-Kele group	C71	tll	Tetela (Otetela, Batetela), Batetela du Nord, Otetela-Olembe, Sungu Batetela	Labaere and Shango 1989; Jacobs 1964: 9-12
C50: Soko-Kele group	C72	ksv	Kusu (Bakusu, Kikusu), Kusu of Kimbombo	Motingea Mangulu 1989; Jacobs 1964: 9-12
C50: Soko-Kele group	C73	nkw	Nkutu (Ankfucu, Bankutu, Nkuchu, Nkutshu, Lonkutshu, Lonkucu)	Jacobs and Omeonga 2004; Hulstaert 1951: 23; Motingea Mangulu 1989
C50: Soko-Kele group	C74/C75	yel/kel	Yela (C74, Boyela), Kela (C75)	Hulstaert 1942; 1999
C50: Soko-Kele group	C76	oml	Ombo (Hombo, Loombo)	Meeussen 1952
C50: Soko-Kele group	C80	oml		
C50: Soko-Kele group	C81	dez	Dengese (Ndengese, Londengese), Nkutu	Hulstaert 1951; Goemaere 1984
C50: Soko-Kele group	C82	soe	Hendo (Ohendo, Lohendo, Ohendo), “Songomeno,” Hendo	Hulstaert 1951; Motingea Mangulu 1990b
C50: Soko-Kele group	C83	buf	Bushoong (Bushong, Bushongo, Busoong), Bakuba (Kuba, Bacuba), Batwa du Kasayi, Cwa du royaume Kuba), Ngeende (C83A, Ngende, Ngendi), Ngongo (C83B), Pyaang (C83C, Pianga, Piong, Panga), Shuwa (C83D, Shobwa, Shoba, Loshoobo)	Hiernaux 1966; Vansina 1959: 5
C50: Soko-Kele group	C84	lel	Lele (Bashilele, Usilele)	Douglas 1963; Maes 1934; Boone 1973
C50: Soko-Kele group	C85	won	Wongo (Bawongo), Gongo (Bakong, Tukkongo, Tukongo, Tukungo)	Maes 1934; Boone 1973
D10	D11	mdq	Mbole (Lombole, Mbole of the Lomami), Yaikole, Yaisu, Yangonda, Lokaló de la haute Jwafa, Langa (C701)	Motingea Mangulu 1993b; de Rop 1971; Hulstaert 1988
D10	D12	lej	Lengola (Kilengola, Lengora)	Stappers 1971
D10	D13	zmq	Mituku (Metoko, Kinya-Mituku)	Stappers 1973; McMaster 1988
D10	D14	gey	Enya (Genya, Tsheenya, Wagenya), Baena, Enya at Kisangani (D14A), Enya at Kongolo (D14B)	Spa 1973
D10	-	-	Mokpá, Bamanga Belueli, Pygmies of the Apare river Rundi Kitwa, Batwa of Burundi Kwandu Ngendelengo	Motingea Mangulu 1990; Vorbichler 1964; Schebesta 1953; van der Burgt 1902; Jordan 2015; Laranjo Medeiros 1981; Jordan 2015; Laranjo Medeiros 1981
D20: Lega-Holoholo	D201	lik	Liko (Lika, Balika, Kilika, Liliká, Lilikó)	van Geluwe 1960; Harvey 1997
D20: Lega-Holoholo	D21	bcp	Bali (Baali, Kibaali, Kibala, Kibali, Libaali, Mabali), Bafwandaka, Bakundumu, Bekeni, Bemili	Harvey 1997; van Geluwe 1960; McMaster 1988
D20: Lega-Holoholo	D211	kzy	Kango (Dikango), ‘Dibatchua’	Schebesta 1952; Vorbichler 1964; Harvey 1997
D20: Lega-Holoholo	D22	rwm	Amba (Baamba, Kivamba, Ku-Amba, Kuamba, Kwamba, Rwaamba, RwaAmba, Rwamba)	Winter 1953; Joset 1952
D20: Lega-Holoholo	D23	kmw	Komo (Kumu, Kikomo, Kikumo, Kikumu, Kikuumu, Kumo, Kuumu)	Harries 1958; McMaster 1988
D20: Lega-Holoholo	D24	sod	Songola (Kesongola, Kisongoola, Songoora, Wasongoa, Watchongoa), Binja, Gengele (Kegengele)	Schoenbrun 1994; Delhaise 1909; Hackett and van Bulck 1956: 90
D20: Lega-Holoholo	D25	lgm	Lega-Mwenga, Lega-Ntara, Isile (Ileka Ishile, Ishile, Isile, Kisile, Sile), Iwanyabaale, Kileega of Bakabango, Eastern Lega	Biebuyck 1973; Bastin et al. 1999: 209-210; Botne 2003: 422-423
D20: Lega-Holoholo	D251	lea	Lega-Shabunda, Lega-Malinga, Kitila, Kiliga, Kiyoma, Kigala, Gonzabale, Beya-Munsange, Banagabo, Pangi Lega	Biebuyck 1973; Bastin et al. 1999: 209-210; Botne 2003: 422-423
D20: Lega-Holoholo	D251	khx	Kanu (Kaanu, Kano, Kanu, Kikaanu, Likanu)	Biebuyck 1973
D20: Lega-Holoholo	D251	ktf	Kwame (Kikwame, Kikwami, Kwami)	Biebuyck 1973
D20: Lega-Holoholo	D26	zmb	Zimba, Ḱεsĺε, kisémolo, kyεnyε-mánila, kikwángε	Kabungama 1992
D20: Lega-Holoholo	D27	bnx	Bangubangu (Bango-Bango, Bangobango, Kibangobango)	Meeussen 1954
D20: Lega-Holoholo	D28	hoo	Holoholo (Horohoro), West Holoholo (D28a, Guha, Kalanga), East Holoholo (D28b), Tumbwe (D281), Lumbwe (D282)	Coupez 1955; Maho and Sands 2004; Bastin et al. 1999: 210
D30	D301	kbj	Kare (Kare, Akare, Likarili)	Dijkmans 1974; Santandrea 1964
D30	D302	bqu	Guru (Boguru, Kogoro, Bukur)	Costermans 1953; van Bulck 1952; McMaster 1988: 242; 263
D30	D303	nbd/myc	Bangbinda (Bungbinda, Ngbinda, Ngminda, Ngenda), Mayeka (D307)	Hackett and van Bulck 1956; Johnston 1922; Santandrea 1948; McMaster 1988
D30	D304	hom	Homa (Hôma, Huma)	Santandrea 1948; Santandrea 1963; Hackett and van Bulck 1956
D30	D305	nyc/gti	Nyanga-li, Gbati-ri (D306)	(Hackett and van Bulck 1956: 74)
D30	D308	boy	Bodo	Santandrea 1963; Santandrea 1948; McMaster 1988: 242; 263
D30	D31	bhy	Bhele (Bili, Ebhele, Ipere, Kipere, Kipili, Pere, Peri, Pili, Piri)	Meyer and Raymond 1981; de Wit 1994
D30	D311	bip	Bila (Babila, Ebila, Forest Bila, Forest Bira, Kibila)	Kutsch Lojenga 2003
D30	D312	kkq	Kaiku (Ikaiku, Kaiko)	de Wit 1994
D30	D32	brf	Bera (Bira, Plains Bira, Babira, Wawira, Grassland Bavira, Lower Bera), Sese	van Geluwe 1956
D30	D33	nlj	Nyali (Banyari, Linyali), “Huku”	Harries 1959; van Geluwe 1960
D30	D331	vau	Vanuma (Bvanuma, Libvanuma, Livanuma), Mbuttu (D313, Pygmy language spoken in Avakubi district on the north side of the Ituri between its confluence with the Epulu and with the Nepoko)	Schebesta 1966; Johnston 1922: 484-495
D30	D332	buu	Budu (Badimbisa Budu, Bodo, Ebudu, Kibudu, Mabudu	Asangama 1983
D30	D333	ndk	Ndaaka (Ndaka, Bombo Ndaka, Indaaka)	Harvey 1997; van Geluwe 1960
D30	D334	zmw	Mbo (Imbo, Kimbo, Mbo-Beke)	van Geluwe 1960
D30	D335	bkf	Beeke (Beke, Ibeeke, Beeke)	Hackett and van Bulck 1956: 84
D30	D336	jgb	Ngbele (Lingbe, Lingbee, Mangbele, Ngbee)	Hackett and van Bulck 1956; Liesenborghs 1932; Verhulpen 1936b
D40: Nyanga	D41	see JD41		
D40: Nyanga	D42	see JD42		
D40: Nyanga	D43	nyj	Nyanga (Inyanga, Kinyanga)	Hackett and van Bulck 1956; Mateene 1980
D50: Bembe-Buyi	D501-D531	see JD50		
D50: Bembe-Buyi	D54	bmb	Bembe (Babembe of Kivu, Beembe, Bembe, Ebembe, Ibembe)	Meeussen 1953; Verhulpen 1936b; Biebuyck 1973
D50: Bembe-Buyi	D55	byi	Buyu (Boyo, Bujwe, Buyi, Kibuyu)	Meeussen 1953; Biebuyck 1973
E40: Temi	E401-E45	see JE40		
E40: Temi	E46	soz	Temi (GiTemi), Ketemi), “Sonjo”	Nurse and Rottland 1992
E50: Kikuyu-Kamba group	E51	kik	Kikuyu (Gekoyo, Gikuyu)	Mutahi 1981; Sim 1977
E50: Kikuyu-Kamba group	E52	ebu	Embo (Embu), Mbeere (Mbere, Kimbeere)	Mwaniki 2014; Mutahi 1981; Möhlig 1974
E50: Kikuyu-Kamba group	E53	mer	Meru (Kimeru, Mero), Imenti	Möhlig 1974
E50: Kikuyu-Kamba group	E531	mws	Mwimbi-Muthambi	Möhlig 1974
E50: Kikuyu-Kamba group	E54	thk	Tharaka (Tharaka, Central Tharaka, Saraka, Sharoka), Thagicu	Möhlig 1974
E50: Kikuyu-Kamba group	E541	cuh	Chuka (Chuku, Cuka, Suka)	Möhlig 1974
E50: Kikuyu-Kamba group	E55	kam	Kamba (Kenya), Kekamba, Kikamba)	Lindblom 1926: 3-18
E50: Kikuyu-Kamba group	E56	dhs	Daisu (Dhaisu, Daiso, Kidhaiso), “Segeju”	Nurse 2000
E60: Chaga group	E61	see West Kilimanjaro E621		
E60: Chaga group	E62a	see West Kilimanjaro E621, Central Kilimanjaro E622		
E60: Chaga group	E62b	see Central Kilimanjaro E622		
E60: Chaga group	E621A (=E61)	rwk	Rwa (Rwo), Meru (Mero)	Philippson 1984; Winter 1980
E60: Chaga group	E621B (=E62a)	jmc	Machame (Caga-Machame, Kimachame, Kimashami, Macame, Machambe, Madjame, Mashami), Siha (E621C, Kisiha), Narumu, Ng’uni (E621F), “Hai,” Masama (621E, Masdama)	Philippson 1984; Winter 1980
E60: Chaga group	E622A (=E62a)	old	Mochi (Kimochi, Kimoshi, Moshi, Mosi), Mbokomu (E622B), Uru (E622D, Oru), Kuma (Okuma, “Rusha,” E63)	Philippson 1984; Winter 1980
E60: Chaga group	E622C (=E62b)	vun	Vunjo (Wunjo, Kivunjo, Kiwunjo, Wuunjo), Lema (Kilema), Kiruwa, Mamba, Woso (Kiw’oso, Kibosho), Kindi, Kombo, Mweka (Mwika), Marangu (Morang’u), Kiruwa	Philippson 1984; Winter 1980
E60: Chaga group	E623 (=E62c)	rof	Rombo (Kirombo), Keni (E623D), Mashati (E623B), Mkuu (E623C), Usseri (E623A, Kiseri, Useri), Mriti	Philippson 1984; Winter 1980
E60: Chaga group	E64	hka	Kahe, Kikahe	Kahigi 2008; Winter 1980
E60: Chaga group	E65	gwe	Gweno (Ghonu, Gweno, Ki-Gweno, Kighonu, Kigweno)	Winter 1980; Philippson and Nurse 2000
E70: Nyika-Taita group	E701	mlk	Elwana (Ilwana, Kiwilwana), ‘Malakote’	van Otterloo and van Otterloo 1980; Nurse 2000
E70: Nyika-Taita group	E71	pkb	Pokomo (Pfokomo), Buu, Upper Pokomo (E71A), Lower Pokomo (E71B, Malachini)	Nurse and Hinnebusch 1993
E70: Nyika-Taita group	E72a,e,G,H	nyf	Giryama (Agiryama, Giriama, Giryama, Kigiriama), Nyika (Nika, Kinyika), Kambe (E72G), Chwaka, Rabai (E72e), Ribe (E72H)	van Otterloo and van Otterloo 1980; Möhlig 1986
E70: Nyika-Taita group	E72b,c,F	coh	Kauma (E72b), Chonyi (E72c, Conyi, Chichonyi), Jibana (E72F, Dzihana, Chidzihana)	van Otterloo and van Otterloo 1980; Möhlig 1986
E70: Nyika-Taita group	E72d	dug	Duruma	Möhlig 1986; van Otterloo and van Otterloo 1980
E70: Nyika-Taita group	E73	dig	Digo (Kidigo), Degere (E732 Madhaka)18	Nicolle 2013: 1-5
E70: Nyika-Taita group	E731	seg	Segeju (Kisegeju, Sageju, Segeju, Sengeju)	Nurse 1982
E70: Nyika-Taita group	E74a,C	dav	Taita, Dawida (Dabida, Davida, E74a), Bura, Chawia, Kasigau (E74C, Kisighau)	van Otterloo and van Otterloo 1980
E70: Nyika-Taita group	E74b	tga	Sagalla (Kisagalla, Sagala, Sagalla Taita, Saghala), Dambi, Kishamba	van Otterloo and van Otterloo 1980
F10: Tongwe-Bende group	F11	tny	Tongwe (Kitongwe, Kitoongwe, Sitongwe)	Masele 2001
F10: Tongwe-Bende group	F12	bdp	Bende, Gongwe	Abe 2011
F20: Sukuma-Nyamwezi	F21	suk	Sukuma, Kemunasukuma (F21A, North Sukuma), Kemunangweeli (F21B), Kiiya (F21C, Kiya, JinaKiiya), Kemunadakama (F21D, South Sukuma), Nasa (F21E, Kinaanasa), Sumaabu (F21F, SumaaBu, KisumaaBu), Nelaa (F21G, Kinaanelaa), Ntuzu (Gina-Ntuzu, Kimunantuzu, F21H)	Masele 2001
F20: Sukuma-Nyamwezi	F22A,B,D,E,F,G,H,I,J,K	nym	Nyamwezi (Kinyamwezi), Galaganza (F22A, Sigalagaanza, Garaganza), Mweri (F22B), Nyanyembe (F22D, Unyanyemba, Unyanyembe), Takama (F22E, Dakama), Nangwila (F22F), Ilwana (Kilwana, Ilwana-Nyamwezi F22G), Uyui (F22H), Rambo (F22I), Ndaala (F22J, Ndala), Nyambiu (F22K)	Masele 2001
F20: Sukuma-Nyamwezi	F22C	kcz	Konongo (Kikonoongo), East Nyamwezi	Masele 2001
F20: Sukuma-Nyamwezi	F23	suw	Sumbwa (Kisumbwa, Shisumbwa, Shumbwa), Sisiloombo, Siyoombe	Masele 2001
F20: Sukuma-Nyamwezi	F24	kiv	Kimbu (Kikimbu, Kikiimbu), North KiKiimbu, South Kikiimbu	Masele 2001
F20: Sukuma-Nyamwezi	F25	wun	Bungu (Ici-Wungu, Iciwungu, Kibungu, Ungu, Wungu)	Roth 2011
F30: Nilamba-Rangi	F31A,C,D,E	nim	Nilamba, Ilamba, Central Laamba (F31A, Kinilaamba), Ushoola (F31C, Ushoola), Nyambi (F31D, Iambi), Mbuga (F31E)	Masele 2001
F30: Nilamba-Rangi	F31B	isn	Isanzu (Ihaanzu, Issansu)	Masele 2001
F30: Nilamba-Rangi	F32	rim	Limi (Rimi, Keremi, Kilimi), Ahi (GiAhi, Chahi), Ginyamunyinganyi), Rwana (Girwana), Nyaturu (Kinyaturu, Turu)	Masele 2001
F30: Nilamba-Rangi	F33	lag	Rangi (Langi, Irangi, Kelangi, Kilaangi), Kondoa	Dunham 2007
F30: Nilamba-Rangi	F34	mgz	Mbugwe (Buwe, Kimbugwe, Kiumbugwe, Mbuwe)	Mous 2004
G10: Gogo-Kagulu	G11	gog	Gogo (Chigogo, Cigogo, Gogo, Ki-Gogo, Kigogo)	Gonzales 2002
G10: Gogo-Kagulu	G12	kki	Kagulu (Chikagulu, Cikagulu, Kagulu, Kaguru, Kigaguru, Kikagulu)	Petzell 2008
G10: Gogo-Kagulu	G21	tvs	Taveta (“Tubeta”)	van Otterloo and van Otterloo 1980; Kitetu 2012
G10: Gogo-Kagulu	G22	asa	Pare, Asu (Ashu, Athu, Casu, Chasu, Chiasu), South Pare (G22B, Gonja, Mbaga (G22B), North Pare (G22A)	van Otterloo and van Otterloo 1980; Kitetu 2012; Mreta 2000
G10: Gogo-Kagulu	G23	ksb	Shambala (Šambala, Kisambaa, Kishambaa, Kishambala, Sambaa, Sambala, Sambara, Schambala, Shambaa)	Nurse 1988
G10: Gogo-Kagulu	G24	bou	Bondei (Bonde, Boondei, Kibondei)	Merlevede 1995; Legère 1992
G30: Zigula-Zaramo	G301	doe	Doe (Dohe, Ki-Doe)	Gonzales 2002
G30: Zigula-Zaramo	G31	ziw	Zigula (Chizigula, Kizigua, Kizigula, Msegua, Seguha, Wazegua, Zeguha, Zegura, Zigoua, Zigua, Zigwa)	Petzell and Hammarström 2013
G30: Zigula-Zaramo	G311	xma	Mushungulu (Kimushungulu, Mushunguli, Mushungulu), Zigua in Somalia	Hout 2012; Williams 2012; Grottanelli 1953
G30: Zigula-Zaramo	G32	cwe	Ngwele (Kakwere, Kikwere, Kinghwele, Kwele, Kwere, Ng’were, Ngh’wele, Nhwele, Nwele, Tsinghwele)	Gonzales 2002; Legère 2003
G30: Zigula-Zaramo	G33	zaj	Zaramo (Dzalamo, Saramo, Zalamo (E18))	Gonzales 2002
G30: Zigula-Zaramo	G34	ngp	Ngulu (Kingulu, Ngulu, Nguru, Nguu)	Petzell and Hammarström 2013
G30: Zigula-Zaramo	G35	ruf	Ruguru (Luguru, Cilugulu, Guru, Ikiruguru, Kiluguru, Kiruguru, Lughuru, Lugulu)	Gonzales 2002; Mkude 1974
G30: Zigula-Zaramo	G36	kcu	Kami (Kikami)	Petzell and Hammarström 2013
G30: Zigula-Zaramo	G37	kdc	Kutu (Khutu, Kikutu, Kixutu, Kutu	Petzell and Hammarström 2013
G30: Zigula-Zaramo	G38	vid	Vidunda (Chividunda, Kividunda, Ndunda, Vidunda)	Gonzales 2002; Legère 2007
G30: Zigula-Zaramo	G39	sbm	Sagala (Saghala, Ki-Sagara, Kisagala, Kisagara) Kondoa, Solwe, Kweny, Nkwifiya (Kwiva, Kwifa)	Gonzales 2002
G40: Swahili group	G402	ymk	Makwe (Coastal Makwe, Interior Makwe, Kimakwe, Macue)	Devos 2007
G40: Swahili group	G403	wmw	Mwani (Cap Delgado, Kimwani, Muane, Mwane, Mwani, Quimuane)	Schadeberg 1997
G40: Swahili group	G412	-	Mwiini (Chimwiini, Mwini, Barawa)	Nurse and Hinnebusch 1993
G40: Swahili group	G41–43	swh/swc/ccl	Swahili (Kiswahili), Tikuu (G41, Bajuni, Bagiuni), Socotra Swahili (G411), Amu (G42a, Pate, Siu, Siyu), Mombasa area Swahili (G42b, Mvita, Ngare, Jomvu, Changamwe, Kilindini), Mrima (G42c, Mtang’ata, Lugha ya Zamani), Unguja (G42d, Kiunguja), Malindi (G42E, Mambrui), Fundi (G42F, Chifundi), Chwaka (G42G), Vumba (G42H), Madagascar Swahili (G42I, Nosse Be), Pemba (G43a, Southern Pemba, Northern Pemba), Tumbatu (G43b), Makunduchi (G43c, “Hadimu,” Kae, Kikae), Mafia (G43D, Mbwera, Kingome), Kilwa (G43E), Mgao (G43F, G401, Kimgao), Sidi (G404), Cutchi Swahili, Congo Swahili (Lubumbashi Swahili, Shaba Swahili, Kingwana)	Ashton 1944; Nurse and Hinnebusch 1993; Lodhi 2008; Samarin 2014; Neale 1974
G40: Swahili group	G44(D)	swb	Maore Comorian (Comoro, Komoro, Shimaore)	Full 2006
G40: Swahili group	G44a	zdj	Ngazija (Shingazidja)	Full 2006
G40: Swahili group	G44b	wni	Njuani (Ndzwani, Shindjuani)	Full 2006
G40: Swahili group	G44C	wlc	Mwali (Shimwali)	Full 2006
G50: Pogolo-Ndamba group	G51, G52	poy/ndj	Pogolo (Chipogolo, Chipogoro, Cipogolo, Pogolu, Pogora, Pogoro)Ndamba (Kindamba)	Hendle 1907; Novotná 2005
G60: Bena-Kinga group	G61	sbp	Sango (Mahango, Eshisango, Kisangu), Lori (Rori)	Mumford 1934; Nurse 1988
G60: Bena-Kinga group	G62	heh	Hehe (Ehe, Ekiehe, Kihehe)	Mumford 1934; Nurse 1988
G60: Bena-Kinga group	G63	bez	Bena (Ekibena, Ikibena	Mitterhofer 2013
G60: Bena-Kinga group	G64	pbr	Pangwa (Ekipangwa, Kipangwa)	Stirnimann 1983
G60: Bena-Kinga group	G65	zga	Kinga (Ekikinga, Kikinga)	Schadeberg 1971; Nurse 1988
G60: Bena-Kinga group	G651	gmx	Magoma (Kimagoma)	Schadeberg 1971: 1; 190
G60: Bena-Kinga group	G66	wbi	Wanji (Kivwanji, Kiwanji, Vwanji, Wanji)	Nurse 1988
G60: Bena-Kinga group	G67	kiz	Kisi (Kese, Kikisi)	Fülleborn 1906; Nurse 1988
H10: Kikongo group	H10A	ktu	Kituba (Kikongo-Kutuba), Ikeleve, Kibulamatadi, Kikongo Commercial, Kikongo Simplifie (Kikongo Simplifié), Kikongo Ya Leta, Kileta	Mufwene 2009
H10: Kikongo group	H10B	mkw	Munukutuba (Monokutuba)	Mufwene 2009
H10: Kikongo group	H11	beq	Beembe (Bembe), Keenge, Yari (Kiyari)	Jacquot 1981
H10: Kikongo group	H112A	xku	Kaamba (Kamba, Kikaamba)	Bouka 1989a; de Schryver et al. 2015
H10: Kikongo group	H112B	dde	Doondo (Dondo, Kidoondo)	Even 1931; Mfoutou 1985; Lumwamu 1974
H10: Kikongo group	H12	vif	Vili (Civili, Civili ci Loango, Vili of Mayumbe, Loango)	Mavoungou et al. 2010
H10: Kikongo group	H13	njx	Kunyi (Kuni, Kikunyi, Kugni)	Lumwamu 1974; Bastin et al. 1999
H10: Kikongo group	H131	sdj	Suundi (Kissoundi, Kisuundi, Sunde), Kifouma, Kimongo	Mabiala 1999
H10: Kikongo group	H16a-b	kng	South Kikongo, Kisikongo (H16a), Kisolongo, Kimboma, Central Kikongo, Manyanga (H16b, Kimanyanga), Mazinga, Ndibu (Bandibu), Bwende (H16e), Zoombo (H16h, Zombo, Pende)	Boone 1973; de Schryver et al. 2015; Laman 1936: lxxxv-lxxxvii
H10: Kikongo group	H16c-d	yom/kwy	Yombe (Yoombi, Kiyombe), Ciwoyo, Cizobe, Kakongo, Ndingi (H14), Mboka (H15), Cimbala, Cizali	Boone 1973; de Schryver et al. 2015
H10: Kikongo group	H16f	ldi	Laadi (Laari, Kiladi, Kilari), Ghaangala (H111, Kighaangala, Hangala)	
H10: Kikongo group	H16g-h	kng	Eastern Kikongo, Ntandu (Kintandu), Mbeko, Nkanu (H16h), Mbata, Mpangu	Boone 1973; de Schryver et al. 2015
H20: Kimbundu group	H21	kmb	Mbundu (H21a, Bunda, Bundo, Kimbundo, Quimbundo, Kimbundu), Kimbamba (H21b, Njinga, Ginga, Jinga)	Vieira-Martinez 2006
H20: Kimbundu group	H22	smd	Kisama (Kissama, Quissama, Sama)	Heintze 1970; Price 1872
H20: Kimbundu group	H23	blv	Kibala (Bolo, Libolo, Libollo, Libolu, Lubalo, Lubolo), Haka (Haco), “Ngoya”	Angenot et al. 2011
H20: Kimbundu group	H24	nsx	Songo (Nsongo, Basongo, Massongo, Songu, Sungu)	Jaspert and Jaspert 1930; Vansina 2004
H30: Yaka group	H31	yaf/ppp/lnz	Yaka (Bayaka, Iaka, Iyaka, Kiyaka), Pelende (Phelende), Lonzo	van den Eynde 1968; Ntoya Maselo 2014
H30: Yaka group	H321 (= L101)	shc	Sonde (Soonde, Kisonde), Lua (Luwa)	Boone 1973; Torday and Joyce 1907
H30: Yaka group	H32	sub	Suku (Kisuku)	Piper 1977
H30: Yaka group	H33H34	=-mxg	Hungu, Tsotso, Pombo22Mbangala (H34, Bangala, Cimbangala), Shinji(H35, Sinji, Yungo)	Atkins 1955; Chatelain and Summer 1894
H40: Mbala-Hunganna	H41	mdp	Mbala (Bambala of Kwango, Gimbala, Rumbala)	Boone 1973; Torday and Joyce 1922
H40: Mbala-Hunganna	H42	hum	Hunganna (Huana, Hungaan, Hungana, Kihungana), Saamba (Tsaamba, Tsamba)	Torday and Joyce 1922; Boone 1973; Takizala 1974; Muluwa and Bostoen 2015
JD41: Konzo-Nande group	JD41	koo	Konzo (Kikondjo, Konjo, Lhukonzo, Olukonjo, Olukonzo, Rukonjo, Rukonzo, Rukoonzo), Sanza (Ekisanza)	Schoenbrun 1994
JD41: Konzo-Nande group	JD42	nnb	Nande (Banande, Nandi, Ndandi, Kinande, Kinandi), Shu (Ekishu), Yira (Ekiyira)	Schoenbrun 1994
JD41: Konzo-Nande group	JD43	see under D40		
JD50: Shi-Hunde group	JD501	nyg	Nyindu	Igunzi 2013
JD50: Shi-Hunde group	JD51	hke	Hunde (Kihunde, Kihuunde), Kobi (Rukobi)	Schoenbrun 1994
JD50: Shi-Hunde group	JD52	hav	Haavu (Havu, Kihaavu)	Schoenbrun 1994
JD50: Shi-Hunde group	JD53	shr	Shi (Mashi), Nyabungu	Schoenbrun 1994
JD50: Shi-Hunde group	JD531	tbt	Tembo (Chitembo, Kitembo)	Schoenbrun 1994
JD50: Shi-Hunde group	JD54	see under D50		
JD50: Shi-Hunde group	JD55	see under D50		
JD50: Shi-Hunde group	JD56	kcw	Bwari (Kabwari)	Schoenbrun 1994
JD60: Rwanda-Rundi group	JD61	kin	Rwanda (Kinyarwanda), Hutu), Kisoro Pygmies, Rwanda-Batwa, Fumbira (Rufumbira), Kirashi (JE221), Yaka (JD502)	Schumacher 1950; Munderi 2009; Schoenbrun 1994; Nzita 1992; (Jouannet 1983)
JD60: Rwanda-Rundi group	JD62	run	Rundi (Kirundi)	van Bulck 1957
JD60: Rwanda-Rundi group	JD63	flr	Fuliiru (Fulero, Fuliiro, Fuliru, Kifuliiru)	Otterloo and Otterloo 2011; Schoenbrun 1994
JD60: Rwanda-Rundi group	JD631	job	Vira (Bavira, Kiviira), Joba (Kijoba)	Schoenbrun 1994
JD60: Rwanda-Rundi group	JD64	suj	Subi (Shuubi, Kishubi, Kisubi, Shubi, Shuwi), “Sinja”	Nurse and Philippson 1980
JD60: Rwanda-Rundi group	JD65	han	Hangaza, Kihangaza (KiHangaza)	Schoenbrun 1994
JD60: Rwanda-Rundi group	JD66	haq	Ha (Kiha)	Schoenbrun 1994; Harjula 2004
JD60: Rwanda-Rundi group	JD67	vin	Kivinza (KiVinza), Vinza)	Schoenbrun 1994
JE10: Nyoro-Ganda group	JE101	rub	Gungu (Lugungu, Rugungu)	Schoenbrun 1994
JE10: Nyoro-Ganda group	JE102	tlj	Talinga-Bwisi, Kitalinga (Talinga), (Bwissi, Lubwisi, Lubwissi, Mawissi, Olubwisi)	Paluku 1998
JE10: Nyoro-Ganda group	JE103	ruc	Ruli (Eciruri, Luduuli, Ruli, Ruluuli, Ruluuli-Runyala, Ruuli)	Ladefoged et al. 1972
JE10: Nyoro-Ganda group	JE11	nyo	Nyoro (Lunyoro (LuNyoro, Orunyoro, Runyoro)	Schoenbrun 1994
JE10: Nyoro-Ganda group	JE12	ttj	Tooro (Orutoro, Rutooro, Rutoro, Tooro, Toro, Urutoro)	Rubongoya 1999
JE10: Nyoro-Ganda group	JE121	nix	Hema (Bahima, Hema-Sud, Kihema), Congo Nyoro, Hema	Thiry 2004
JE10: Nyoro-Ganda group	JE13	nyn	Nkore (Nkole, Nyankole, Nyankore, Olunyankole, Runyankole, Runyankore)	Schoenbrun 1994
JE10: Nyoro-Ganda group	JE14	cgg	Chiga (Ciga, Kiga, Ruciga)	Schoenbrun 1994
JE10: Nyoro-Ganda group	JE15	lug	Ganda (Luganda), Sese (Olusese), Vuma (Luvuma)	Schoenbrun 1994; Cunningham 1905
JE10: Nyoro-Ganda group	JE16	xog	Soga (Busoga), Diope (Ludiope), Gabula (Lugabula), Gweri (Lugweri), Kigulu (Lukigulu), Lamogi (Lulamogi, Lulamoogi, Lamoogi), Luuka, Nholo (Lunholo), Siki (Siginyi, Lusiginyi, Lusiki), Tembe (Tembé, Lutembe), Tenga (Lutenga)	Fallers 1968; Schoenbrun 1994
JE10: Nyoro-Ganda group	JE16	lke	Kenyi (Kenye, Kene, Lukenhe)	Ladefoged et al. 1972; Roscoe 1915
JE10: Nyoro-Ganda group	JE17	gwr	Gwere (Lugwere)	Ladefoged et al. 1972
JE10: Nyoro-Ganda group	JE18	-	West Nyala	Kanyoro 1983; Ochwaya-Oluoch 2003: 7-8
JE20: Haya-Jita group	JE21	now	Nyambo (Ekinyambo), “Karagwe”	Schoenbrun 1994
JE20: Haya-Jita group	JE22	hay	Haya, Kyamutwara (JE22A, Kjamtwara, Kiamutwara), Bugabo (JE22B, Bugabu), Bukara (JE22C), Ziba (JE22D, Kiziba), Hanja (JE22E, Kianja, Kihanja, Kjanja), Hangiro (JE22F, Ihangiro), Missenyi (JE22G, Misenyi)	Herrmann 1904; Schoenbrun 1994
JE20: Haya-Jita group	JE23	zin	Zinza (Dzinda, Dzindza, Echidzindza, Jinja)	Schoenbrun 1994
JE20: Haya-Jita group	JE24	ked	Kerebe (Ecikerebe, Ekikerebe, Ikikerebe, Kerewe)	Schoenbrun 1994
JE20: Haya-Jita group	JE25	jit	Jita (Ecejiita, Kijita)	Schoenbrun 1994
JE20: Haya-Jita group	JE251,253	kya	Kwaya (JE251, Kikwaya), Ci-Ruri (JE253, Ruri, Rori, Kirori, Eciruri, Luri, Kiruri, Eciruuri, Ciruri)	Schoenbrun 1994
JE20: Haya-Jita group	JE252	reg	Kara (Kikara), Regi (Kilegi, Kiregi)	Schoenbrun 1994
JE30: Masaba-Luhya group	JE31	myx	Masaba (Masaaba, Lumasaba), Gisu (JE31a, Gesu, Lugisu), Kisu (JE31b), Buya (J41G, Buuya, Lubuya), Dadiri (JE31F, Ludadiri, North Lumasaaba), Lufumbo, Luteza, Luwalasi, Luyobo	Schoenbrun 1994; la Fontaine 1959
JE30: Masaba-Luhya group	JE31c	bxk	Bukusu (Vugusu)	Wagner and Mair 1970; Austen 1975: 1-37; Kanyoro 1983
JE30: Masaba-Luhya group	JE31D	-	Syan (Orusyan), Bumett (Pumit)	Huntingford 1965; Schoenbrun 1994
JE30: Masaba-Luhya group	JE31E	lts	Tachon (Tachoni, Tatsoni)	Kanyoro 1983
JE30: Masaba-Luhya group	JE32a	lwg	Hanga (Wanga, Luwanga, Luhanga)	Kanyoro 1983
JE30: Masaba-Luhya group	JE32b	lto	Tsotso (Olutsotso)	Kanyoro 1983
JE30: Masaba-Luhya group	JE32C	lrm	Marama (Olumarama)	Kanyoro 1983
JE30: Masaba-Luhya group	JE32D	lks	Kisa (Olukisa)	Kanyoro 1983
JE30: Masaba-Luhya group	JE32E	lkb	Kabras (Kabarasi)	Kanyoro 1983
JE30: Masaba-Luhya group	JE32F	nle	East Nyala (Nyala North, Lunyala ‘K’), Kakalewa	Kanyoro 1983
JE30: Masaba-Luhya group	JE33	nyd	Nyole (Abanyole, Lunyole, Lunyore, Nyoole, Nyore, Olunyore)	Kanyoro 1983
JE30: Masaba-Luhya group	JE34	lsm	Saamia (Samia, Lusaamia), Bagwe, Gwe (Lugwe), Songa (JE343)	Kanyoro 1983
JE30: Masaba-Luhya group	JE341	lko	Khayo (Xaayo)	Kanyoro 1983; Marlo 2008
JE30: Masaba-Luhya group	JE342	lri	Marachi (Lumarachi)	Kanyoro 1983
JE30: Masaba-Luhya group	JE35	nuj	Nyole (Lunyole, Nyule, Nyuli), Hadyo (Luhadyo), Sabi (Lusabi), Wesa (Luwesa)	Schadeberg 1989; Morris 1963
JE40: Logooli-Kuria group	JE401	ngq	Ngurimi (Dengurume, Ikingurimi, Kingereme, Kingoreme, Ngoreme)	Schoenbrun 1994
JE40: Logooli-Kuria group	JE402, 404	ikz	Ikizu (JE402, Ikiikiizu, Ikikizo, Ikikizu), Shashi (JE404, Ikishashi, Kishashi)	Schoenbrun 1994
JE40: Logooli-Kuria group	JE403	sxb	Suba (Egisuba, Luo Abasuba)	Rottland 1993
JE40: Logooli-Kuria group	JE405	cwa	Kabwa (Kikabhwa, Kikabwa)	Walker 2013; Chuo Kikuu cha Dar es Salaam 2009
JE40: Logooli-Kuria group	JE406–7	sgm	Singa (E406, Lusinga), Cula (Chula), Ware (E407)	Hobley 1902
JE40: Logooli-Kuria group	JE41	rag	Logooli (Llogoori, Logoli, Lugooli, Luragoli, Maragoli, Maragooli, Ragoli, Uluragooli)	Wagner and Mair 1970
JE40: Logooli-Kuria group	JE411–3	ida	Idakho (JE411, Itakho), Isukha (JE412, Isuxa, Lwisukha), Tiriki (JE413, Tirichi)	Kanyoro 1983
JE40: Logooli-Kuria group	JE42	guz	Gusii (Ekegusii, Guzii, Kisii), Kosova	Cammenga 2002: 17-33
JE40: Logooli-Kuria group	JE43	kuj	Kuria (Egikuria, Ekikuria, Gikuria, Igikuria, Ikikuria, Kikuria Cha Juu, Kikuria Cha Mashariki, Kikuria, Koria, Kulia) 43	Schoenbrun 1994; Cammenga 2004
JE40: Logooli-Kuria group	JE431–4	ssc	Hacha (JE432, Haacha, Kihacha), Ikisimbete (IkiSimbete), Iryege (Iregi, Kiiryege), Kine (Kikine, Kiine), Kiroba, Kironi (Kikirone), Kiseru, Kisimbiti, Kisingiri, Rieri (Ryeri), Simbiti (JE431, Suba-Simbiti) Surwa (JE433, Kisurwa), Sweta (JE434, Kisweta)	Kihore 2000; Schoenbrun 1994
JE40: Logooli-Kuria group	JE44	zak	Zanaki (Ekizanaki, Ikizanaki, Ilizanaki, Kizanaki)	Walker 2013; Schoenbrun 1994
JE40: Logooli-Kuria group	JE45	ntk	Ikoma (Koma, Kiikoma), Isenye (Issenye, Isenyi, Kiisenye), Nata (Ekinata, Natta, Kinatta, Kinata, Ikinata)	Walker 2013; Schoenbrun 1994
JE40: Logooli-Kuria group	JE46	see under E40		
K10: Ciokwe-Luchazi group	K11	cjk	Chokwe (Batshokwe, Ciokwe, Kioko, Kiokwe, Quioca, Quioco, Shioko, Tschiokloe, Tshokwe)	Vansina 2004
K10: Ciokwe-Luchazi group	K12a	lum	Lwimbi (Chiluimbi, Luimbe, Luimbi, Lwimbe)	Jaspert and Jaspert 1930
K10: Ciokwe-Luchazi group	K12b	nba	Gangela (Ganguela, Ganguella, Ngangela) Nyemba (Nhemba)	Fleisch 2009; Maniacky 2003
K10: Ciokwe-Luchazi group	K13	lch	Lucazi (Chiluchazi, Luchazi, Lujash, Lujazi, Lutchaz, Lutshase, Luxage)	Fleisch 2009
K10: Ciokwe-Luchazi group	K14	lue	Lwena (Luena), Luvale (Chiluvale, Lovale, Lubale, Luena, Luvale)	Papstein 1978; Horton 1949
K10: Ciokwe-Luchazi group	K15	mck	Mbuunda (Chimbunda, Mbunda)	McCulloch 1951; Fleisch 2009; Papstein 1994
K10: Ciokwe-Luchazi group	K16	nye	Nyengo (Nhengo, Nyenko)	Fortune 1963
K10: Ciokwe-Luchazi group	K17	mfu	Mbwela (Ambuela, Ambuella, Ambwela, Mbuela, Mbwera, Shimbwera)	Fleisch 2009; Bostoen 2007; McCulloch 1951; Maniacky 2003
K10: Ciokwe-Luchazi group	K18	nkn	Nkangala (Cangala, Ngangala)	Maniacky 2003
K20: Lozi group	K21	loz	Lozi (Silozi), “Sikololo,” “Kolololo”	Fortune 2001; Jalla 1917; Burger 1960
K30: Luyana group	K31	lyn	Luyana (Ca-Luiana, Esiluyana, Louyi, Lui, Rouyi), Kwandi (K371), Kwangwa (K37)	Lisimba 1982; Fortune 1963
K30: Luyana group	K32	mxo	Mbowe (Esimbowe), Liyuwa (K322), Liyuwa	Lisimba 1982; Fortune 1963
K30: Luyana group	K33	kwn	Kwangali (Kwangare, Kwangari, Rukwangali, Rukwangari, Sikwangali)	Möhlig 1997
K30: Luyana group	K331, 332, 334	diu	Dciriku (K332, Gciriku, Diriku), Sambyu (K331), Rumanyo (K334, Manyo)	Möhlig 2007
K30: Luyana group	K333	mhw	Mbukushu (Thimbukushu)	Möhlig 1997; Larson 1981
K30: Luyana group	K34	mho	Mashi (Masi), Kwandu	Laranjo Medeiros 1981; Lisimba 1982
K30: Luyana group	K35	sie	Simaa, Mulonga (K351), Mbume (K321, Mbumi), Imilangu (K354), Mwenyi (K352)	Bostoen 2007; Fortune 1963; Lisimba 1982
K30: Luyana group	K36	-	Shanjo	de Luna 2008; Bostoen 2009
K40: Subiya-Totela group	K402	fwe	Fwe	Bostoen 2009; Seidel 2005; de Luna 2008; Pretorius 1975
K40: Subiya-Totela group	K41	ttl	Totela (Echitotela), Totela of Namibia (K411)	Seidel 2005; Crane 2011; de Luna 2008
K40: Subiya-Totela group	K42,	sbs	Subiya (Echisubia, Subia), Ikuhane (Chikuahane,	Seidel 2005; Ohly 1994
K40: Subiya-Totela group	K401	sbs	Chikwahane, Ciikuhane, Ikuhane, Mbalangwe (K401, Mbalanwe)	de Luna 2008
L10: Pende group	L11	pem	Pende (Bapende, Gipende, Giphende, Kipende, Pheende, Phende)	Weeckx 1938; Torday and Joyce 1922; Bittremieux 1939
L10: Pende group	L12b	hol	Holo (Holu, Kiholo, Kiholu), Yeci	Boone 1973; Atkins 1955
L10: Pende group	L13	kws	Kwese (Gikwezo, Kikwese, Kwezo, Ukwese)	Boone 1973; Forges 1983; Torday and Joyce 1907
L20: Songe group	L201	-	Budya (L201), Yazi (L202)	
L20: Songe group	L21	kcv	Kete (Lu-Kete, Lukete, Ciket), East Kete (L21A), North Kete (L21B, Kete-Kuba), Kete-Lulua (L21C, South-West Kete)	Kamba Muzenga 1980: 3-4; Maes 1934; Boone 1973
L20: Songe group	L221	lwa	Lwalwa (Lwalu)	Boone 1973; Timmermans 1967; Bastin et al. 1999
L20: Songe group	L23	sop	Songe (Basonge, Kisonge, Kisongi, Kisongye, Luba-Songi, Lusonge), East Songye, North Songye (Ikaleebwe), South Songye, Beelandé 45	van Overbergh 1908; Stappers 1964: 3; Torday and Joyce 1922
L20: Songe group	L22/L231	bpj	Mbagani, Binji (Bindji, Babindji)	van Coillie 1949; Bastin et al.1999: 21
L20: Songe group	L24	luj	Luna-Inkongo, Northern Luba	Westcott no date
L30: Luba group	L31	lua	Luba-Lulua, Luba-Kasai (L31a, Tshiluba, Ciluba), West Luba (L31b, Lulua, Luluwa, Bena-Lulua)	de Clercq 1903: i-vi
L30: Luba group	L32	kny	Kanioka, Kanyok, Kanyoka	de Clercq 1900; Stappers 1986: xiv-xv
L30: Luba group	L33	lub	Luba-Katanga, Kiluba, East Luba, Luba-Shaba	Verhulpen 1936a
L30: Luba group	L34	hem	Hemba (Kiemba, Kihemba), Yazi (L202), Zela (K331, Kizela, Kimbote, Mbote), Eastern Luba, Luba-Hemba, Kebwe (L301)	Vandermeiren 1912; Bastin et al. 1999; van Bulck 1948; Kabange Mukala 2005
L30: Luba group	L35	sng	Sanga (Kisanga), Garengaze (Garenganze), South Luba, Luba-Sanga	Clarke 1911
L40: Kaonde group	L41	kqn	Kaonde (Chikahonde, Chikaonde, Kahonde, Kawonde, Luba Kaonde), Solwezi, Kasempa	Kashoki and Mann 1978
L50: Lunda group	L51	slx	Salampasu (Basala Mpasu, Chisalampasu), Luntu (L511, Luuntu, Bakwa Luntu)	Maes 1934; Denolf 1954
L50: Lunda group	L52	lun	Lunda (Balunda, Chilunda, Southern Lunda), Ndembu	McCulloch 1951; Kawasha 2003
L50: Lunda group	L53	rnd	Ruund (Ruwund, Chiluwunda, Lunda Kambove, Lunda-Kamboro, Luunda, Luwunda, Northern Lunda), Kanincin	Stappers 1954; Nash 1992
L60: Nkoya group	L60–62	nka	Nkoya (L62), Mbwela (L61, Mbwera, Mbowera), Kolwe (L601, Lukolwe), Lushangi (L602, Lushange), Shasha (L603, Mashasha), Mbowela (Mbwera, Shimbwera, Mbwela), Nkoya, Shasha, Shinkoya	Simwinga 2006; Gluckman 1951; McCulloch 1951: 93-101
M10: Fipa-Mambwe group	M11	piw	Pimbwe (Cipimbwe, Ichipimbwe, Icipimbwe, Kipimbwe)	Abe 2011; Chomba 1975; Maurice 1938
M10: Fipa-Mambwe group	M12	rnw	Rungwa (Ichirungwa, Icilungwa, Kirungwa, Lungwa, Nyalungwa, Runga)	Walsh and Swilla 2001
M10: Fipa-Mambwe group	M13	fip	Fipa (Fiba, Cifipa), Fipa-Sukuma (M13A), South Fipa (M13B), Kandaasi (M13C), Siiwa (M13D), Nkwaamba (M13E), Kwa (M13F), Kwaafi (M13G), Ntile (N13H, Cile, “Yantili”), Kuulwe (M131), Peemba (M13I)	Walsh and Swilla 2001; Willis 1966
M10: Fipa-Mambwe group	M14/15	mgr	Lungu (M14, Rungu), Mambwe (M14)	Walsh and Swilla 2001
M20: Nyiha-Safwa group	M201	lai	Lambya (Rambya), North Lambya (M201A), Central Lambya (M201B), South Lambya (M201C)	Walsh and Swilla 2001
M20: Nyiha-Safwa group	M21	wbh	Wanda (Wandia), Sichela	Walsh and Swilla 2001; Lindfors et al. 2009b
M20: Nyiha-Safwa group	M22	mwn	Inamwanga (Ichinamwanga, Namwanga, Nyamwanga), Iwa (M26), Tambo (M27, Tembo)	Walsh and Swilla 2001
M20: Nyiha-Safwa group	M23A	nkt	West Nyika, Nyika of Sumbawanga	Lindfors et al. 2009a
M20: Nyiha-Safwa group	M23B	nih	Central Nyiha, Nyiha of Mbozi	Lindfors et al. 2009a
M20: Nyiha-Safwa group	M23C	nyr	East Nyika, Nyika of Rungwe Lindfors et al. 2009a Walsh and Swilla 2001	
M20: Nyiha-Safwa group	M23D	nkv	South Nyiha	Lindfors et al. 2009a; Walsh and Swilla 2001
M20: Nyiha-Safwa group	M24	mgq	Malila (Ishimalilia, Kimalila, Malela, Malilia)	Walsh and Swilla 2001
M20: Nyiha-Safwa group	M25	sbk	Safwa, Safwa of Mbeya (M25A), Mbwila (M25B, Uleenje), Soongwe (M25C), Polooto (M25D, Poroto), Guruka (M25E)	Walsh and Swilla 2001; Msanjila 2004
M30: Nyakyusa-Ngonde group	M301	ndh	Ndali (Chindali), Sukwa (Chisukwa)	Botne 2008; Kershner 2002
M30: Nyakyusa-Ngonde group	M31	nyy	Nyakyusa-Ngonde, Nyakyusa (M31A, Nyekyosa, Iki-Nyikusa), Kukwe (M31B, Ngumba), Mwamba (M31C, Lugulu, “Sokelo”), Ngonde (M31D), Selya (M31E, Kaaselya), Penja (M302)	Walsh and Swilla 2001
M40: Bemba group	M401	bwc	Bwile	Brelsford 1956; Bastin et al. 1999
M40: Bemba group	M402	auh	Aushi (Avaushi, Ushi, Usi, Uzhil, Vouaousi)	Doke 1933; Whiteley 1950
M40: Bemba group	M41	tap	Tabwa (Taabua, Taabwa, Ichitaabwa), Shila	Whiteley 1950
M40: Bemba group	M41	bem	Bemba (Icibemba, Wemba)	Whiteley 1950; Kashoki and Mann 1978
M50	M51–52	leb	Lala-Bisa, Bisa (M51, Wisa), Lala (M52, Ichilala), Ambo (M521), Unga, Twa of Bangweulu, Luano (M522)	Brelsford 1946; Whiteley 1950; von Rosen 1916
M50	M54	lam	Lamba, Swaka (M53), Lima (M541, Bulima), Temba (M542)	Doke 1922; Whiteley 1950; Brelsford 1956; Bastin et al. 1999: 219
M50	M55	kdg	Seba, Shishi	Whiteley 1950
M60: Lenje-Tonga group/Bantu-Botatwe group	M61	leh	Lenje (Chilenje, Lengi, Lenji), Batwa of the Lukanga (M611), Ciina (Chinamukuni, Ciina Mukuni, Mukuni)	Shekleton 1908; de Luna 2008
M60: Lenje-Tonga group/Bantu-Botatwe group	M62	sby	Soli (Chisoli)	de Luna 2008
M60: Lenje-Tonga group/Bantu-Botatwe group	M63	ilb	Ila (Chiila [E18), Batwa of the Kafue (M633), Lundwe (M632)	Smith 1907; de Luna 2008; Doke 1928; Torrend 1931
M60: Lenje-Tonga group/Bantu-Botatwe group	M631	shq	Sala (M631)	de Luna 2008
M60: Lenje-Tonga group/Bantu-Botatwe group	M64	toi	Tonga (Chitonga, Tonga of Zambia and Zimbabwe), Ndawe, Plateau Tonga, Valley Tonga, We-Zambezi [E18]	de Luna 2008; Hachipola 1991
M60: Lenje-Tonga group/Bantu-Botatwe group	M651–652	dov	Toka (M651), Leya (M652, Reya), “Dombe”	Hachipola 1998; de Luna 2008
N10: Manda group	N101	dne	Ndendeule (Kidendauli, Kindendeule, Kindendeuli, Ndendeuli)	Nurse 1988; Booth 1905
N10: Manda group	N102	nxi	Nindi (Kinindi, Manundi)	Maho and Sands 2004; Booth 1905
N10: Manda group	N11	mgs	Manda (Kimanda), Matumba	Fülleborn 1906; Nurse 1988
N10: Manda group	N12	ngo	Ngoni of Tanzania (Angoni, Chingoni, Kingoni), Kisutu	Spiss 1904; Ebner 1955; Miti 1996
N10: Manda group	N13	mgv	Matengo (Chimatengo, Ki-Matengo, Kimatengo)	Yoneda 2000; Nurse 1988
N10: Manda group	N14	mpa	Mpoto (Chimpoto, Cimpoto, Kimpoto, Mpoto)	Nurse 1988
N10: Manda group	N15	tog	Tonga (Chitonga), Tonga of Malawi, Siska, Sisya	Turner 1952; Young 1933; Turner 1952
N20: Tumbuka group	N21	tum	Tumbuka (N21a, Chitumbuka, Citumbuka), Poka (N21b, Chipoka, Phoka), Kamanga (N21b, Nkhamanga, Henga, Ci-Henga), Senga (N21d, Senga in the Luangwa Valley in the Lundazi District), Yombe (N21e), Fungwe (N21f), Wenya (N21g)	Young 1923; Brelsford 1956
N30: Chewa-Nyanja group	N31	nya/mjh	Chewa-Nyanja, Nyanja (N31a, Chinyanja), Chewa (N31b, Achewa, Cewa), Manganja (N31c, South Nyanja), Mozambique Nyasa (N31D, Nyasa-Cewa), Maravi (Malawi), Peta, Mwera of Mbamba Bay(N201)27	Stigand 1909; of Malawi 2006; of Malawi 2009
N40: Senga-Sena group	N41	nse	Nsenga (Cinsenga, Chinsenga, Nsenga on the lower Luangwa in the Petauke-Lusaka-Feira districts), Kunda of Mambwe district	Miti 2004; Brelsford 1956
N40: Senga-Sena group	N42	kdn	Kunda (Achikunda, Chikunda, Cikunda)	Hachipola 1998; Brelsford 1956
N40: Senga-Sena group	N43	nyu	Nyungwe (Chinyungwe, Chinyungwi, Cinyungwe, Nyongwe, Yungwe), Tete (Tetense, Teta), Pimbi (Phimbi, Pimbe)	van der Mohl 1904
N40: Senga-Sena group	N44	seh	Sena (Chisena, Cisena, Mocambique Sena), Podzo (N46, Ci-Podzo, Phodzo, Shiputhsu, Chipodzo, Puthsu)	van der Mohl 1904
N40: Senga-Sena group	N441	swk	Sena (Chisena, Cisena, Malawi Sena)	Funnell 2004
N40: Senga-Sena group	N45	bwg	Rue (Barwe, Chirue), Balke (Cibalke)	Macalane 2000; Mangoya 2012; Hachipola 1998
P10: Matuumbi group	P11/12	ndg/rui	Ndengereko (Kindengereko, Kingengereko, Ndengeleko), Rufiji (Kirufiji)	Ström 2013
P10: Matuumbi group	P13	mgw	Matuumbi (Kimatumbi, Kimatuumbi, Matumbi)	Nurse 1988
P10: Matuumbi group	P14	nnq	Ngindo (Ci-Ngindo, Cingindo, Gindo, Kingindo, Njindo, Njinjo)	Cross-Upcott 1956; Nurse 1988
P10: Matuumbi group	P15	mgy	Mbunga (Bunga, Kimbunga)	Nurse 1988
P20: Yao group	P21	yao	Yao (Chiyao, Ciyao, Djao, Jao)	Whiteley 1966: xiii-xv
P20: Yao group	P22	mwe	Mwera (Cimwela, Cimwera, Kimwera, Mwela)	Harries 1950
P20: Yao group	P23/P24	kde/njd	Makonde (Simakonde, Chimakonde, Chinimakonde, Kimakonde, Konde, Makonde), “Mavia” (P25, Mávia, Maviha, Cimabiha, Mabiha, Kimawiha, Mawia, Chimaviha, Mawiha), Maraba (Chimaraba), Tambwe (Matambe, Matambwe, Chimatambwe), Chinnima, Ndonde (Chindonde)	Kraal 2005: 1-7
P20: Yao group	P23	mvw	Machinga	Steere 1876
P30: Makhuwa group	P31A,E	vmw	Central-Makhuwa, Makhuwa Enahara (P31E), Nampula	Kröger 2005; Prata 1960
P30: Makhuwa group	P31B,G	mgh	Meetto (Metto), Makhuwa-Meetto, Masasi, Ruvuma Makhuwa, Imithupi, Ikorovere	Kröger 2005; Prata 1960
P30: Makhuwa group	P31C	vmk	Chirima (Shirima)	Kröger 2005; Prata 1960
P30: Makhuwa group	P31C	kzn	Kokola	Shrum and Shrum 2001
P30: Makhuwa group	P31C	llb	Lolo	Reiman 2002; Shrum and Shrum 2001; Vinton and Vinton 2001
P30: Makhuwa group	P31C	mny	Manyawa	Reiman 2002; Shrum and Shrum 2001; Vinton and Vinton 2001
P30: Makhuwa group	P31C	vmr	Marenje (Emarendje, Marendje, Marenji)	Shrum and Shrum 2001; Reiman 2002
P30: Makhuwa group	P31C	tke	Takwane (Thakwani)	Shrum and Shrum 2001; Reiman 2002
P30: Makhuwa group	P31D	xmc	Marrevone (Marevone), Nampamela	Prata 1960; Kröger 2005
P30: Makhuwa group	P31F	xsq	Esaka (Esaaka, Saaka, Saanga, Saka, Sanga)	Katupha 1991
P30: Makhuwa group	P311	eko	Koti (Ekoti, Coti), “Angoje”	Schadeberg and Mucanheia 2000; Lyndon and Lyndon 2007
P30: Makhuwa group	P312	nte	Sakati (Sangaji, Esakaji), Enatthembo	Prata 1960; Lyndon and Lyndon 2007
P30: Makhuwa group	P32	ngl	Lomwe (Ilomwe, Lomue), Western Makua	Prata 1960
P30: Makhuwa group	P33,331	lon	Malawi Lomwe, Nguru (Ngulu, Anguru), Mihavane	Kayambazinthu 2004
P30: Makhuwa group	P34	chw	Central Chuwabo (Chichwabo, Chuabo, Chuwabo, Chuwabu, Txuwabo, Chwabo, Cuabo, Cuwabo, Echuabo), Quellimane	Vinton and Vinton 2001
P30: Makhuwa group	P34	cwb	Maindo, Badoni, Mitange	Vinton and Vinton 2001
P30: Makhuwa group	P341	mhm	Moniga (Emakhuwa-Emoniga, Emoniga)	Kröger 2005
R10: Umbundu group	R11	umb	Umbundu (M’bundo), Bailoundou (Mbalundu), Bihe, Hanya, Nano, Ovimbundu, South Mbundu, Mbali (R103, Kimbari, Olumbali30)	Hambly 1934; Jaspert and Jaspert 1930; Lopes Cardoso 1966
R10: Umbundu group	R12	ndq	Ndombe (Dombe, Bandombe, Mondome)	Ferreira Diniz 1918
R10: Umbundu group	R13	nyk	Nyaneka (Nhaneca, Lunyaneka), Mwila (Olumuila, Huila, Muila), Ngambwe (Olungambwe)	Lang and Tastevin 1937
R10: Umbundu group	R14	khu	Khumbi (Lun’cumbi, Lunkumbi, Ngumbi, Nkhumbi, Nkumbi), Ndongwena (R215), Kwankwa (R216)	Estermann 1979; Nogueira 1885; Lusakalalu 2001
R20: Wambo group	R21	kua	Kwanyama (Kuanyama), Kafima (R211), Evale (R212), Northeastern Wambo	Baucom 1972
R20: Wambo group	R214	lnb	Mbalanhu, Dombondola (R217), Mbandja (R213, Mbadja), Esinga (R218)	Fourie 1997; Baucom 1972
R20: Wambo group	R22	ndo	Ndonga (Oshindonga), South-Eastern Wambo	Baucom 1972
R20: Wambo group	R23	kwm	Kwambi, South-Central Wambo	Baucom 1972
R20: Wambo group	R24	nne	Ngandjera (Ngandyera), Kwaluudhi (R241), Kolonkhadi (R242), Eunda (R242, Oshiunda)	Baucom 1972
R30: Herero group	R101	olu	Kuvale (Kuroka), Kwisi (R102)	Jordan 2015
R30: Herero group	R31A,B,R312	her	Herero (Otjiherero), Central Herero (R31A), Mbandieru (R31B, Mbanderu, East Herero), Botswana Herero (R312, Mahalapye Herero)	Andersson and Janson 1997; Möhlig 2009
R30: Herero group	R311	dhm	North-West Herero, Kaokoland Herero, Dhimba (Zemba, Zimba), Tjimba Herero, Tjimba-Tjimba, Himba	Kunkel and Cameron 2002; Malan 1974
R40: Yeyi group	R41A,B	yey	Yei (Yeyi, Shiyei), “Kuba,” Bayeye, Ciyei, East Caprivi Yeyi (R41A), Ngamiland Yeyi (R41B)	Larson 1992; Seidel 2008
S10: Shona group	S11	twl	Shona, Korekore, Tavara (Tawala), Shangwe, Budya, Gova	Doke 1931
S10: Shona group	S12, S14	sna	Shona, Zezuru (S12, Shawasha, Harava, Hera), Karanga (S14, Duma, Govera, Jena, Nyubi)	Doke 1931
S10: Shona group	S13	mxc	Manyika (Bamanyeka, Chimanyika), Bocha (Boka), Guta, Jindwi, Hungwe	Doke 1931; Fortune 2004
S10: Shona group	S13	twx	Tewe (Teve), Chiute (Ciute, Ciutee)	Fortune 2004; Doke 1931
S10: Shona group	S15	ndc	Ndau (Chindau, “Sofala”), Garwe, Danda, Shanga, Xinyai	Mkanganwi 1972; Doke 1931
S10: Shona group	S16A,C,D,E,F,G,H,I,J,K,L	kck	Kalanga (Ikalanga, West Shona), Lilima (S16C, S16K, Humba, Humbe, Limima, Peri), Nyai (S16D, Abanyai, Banyai, Rozvi, Wanyai), Lemba (S16E, Remba), Lembethu (S16F, Rembethu), Twamamba (S16G, Xwamamba), Pfumbi (S16H), Jawunda (S16I), Romwe (S16J), Talahundra (S16L)	Wentzel 1983; Doke 1931
S10: Shona group	S16B	nmq	Nambya (Nambzva)	Hachipola 1998; Borland 1984
S10: Shona group	-	dmx	Dema	Hachipola 1998
S20: Venda group	S21	ven	Venda (Central Venda), Phani (S21A), Ilafuri (S21B, West Venda), Manda (S21C, Central Venda), Mbedzi (S21D, East Venda), Tavhatsindi (S21E), Ronga (S21F, South-East Venda)	Mulaudzi 2010
S30: Sotho-Tswana group	S31	tsn	Tswana (Setswana, Sechwana), Central Tswana (S31a, Rolong, Ngwaketse), East Tswana (S31b, Kgatla, Tlokwa), North Tswana (S31c, Tawana, Ngwato, Kwena), South Tswana (S31E, Thlaping, Thlaro)	Malepe 1966; Schapera 1952
S30: Sotho-Tswana group	S311 (= S31d)	xkv	Kgalagadi (Kgalagarhi, Kgalagari, Qhalaxarzi)	Kalasi 2003; Krüger and de Plessis 1977
S30: Sotho-Tswana group	S32	nso	Northern Sotho (Sesotho sa Leboa), Pedi (S32a, Sepedi, Masemola, Tau, Komi, Transvaal Sotho), Lobedu (S32b, Kgaga), Gananwa (S32C, Xananwa, Hananwa), Kopa (S32D, Ndebele-Sotho), Eastern Sotho (Kutswe S302, Pai S303, Pulana S304), Phalaborwa (S301)	Doke 1954; Ziervogel 1954
S30: Sotho-Tswana group	S32E	brl	Birwa (S32E, Sebirwa, Virwa)	Batibo 1998; Andersson and Janson 1997: 41-42
S30: Sotho-Tswana group	S32F	two	Tswapong (Setswapong)	van Wyk 1969; Batibo 1998
S30: Sotho-Tswana group	S33	sot	Southern Sotho (Sesotho, Sisutho)	Jacottet 1927: i-xiii
S40: Nguni group	S407	nbl	South Ndebele (Isindebele, Nrebele), Ndzundza (Isindundza), Southern South African Ndebele, Southern Transvaal Ndebele	Skhosana 2009
S40: Nguni group	S408	-	Northern Transvaal Ndebele, Mbo, Moledlhana, Langa, Lidwaba, Sumayela Ndebele, Northern South African Ndebele	Ziervogel 1959
S40: Nguni group	S41	xho	Xhosa (Isixhosa, “Kaffir”), Mpondo (S41A, Pondo), Xesibe (S41B), Bomwana (S41C), Gaika (S41D), Gcaleka (S41E), Thembu (S41F), Mpondomise (S41G), Ndlambe (S41H), Hlubi (S403), Hlubi-Ciskei (S41I)	Mzamane 1962; Cantrell 1946; Ownby 1985
S40: Nguni group	S42	zul	Zulu (Isizulu), KwaZulu-Natal Zulu (S42A), Transvall Zulu (S42B), Qwabe (S42C), Cele (S42D), Ngoni of Malawi (N121), Bhaca (S402, Baca), Lala, Ingwavuma, Lala (S406, North Lala, South Lala), Old Mfengu (S401, Fingo)	Ownby 1985; van Dyk 1960; Miti 1996
S40: Nguni group	S43	ssw	Swati (Swazi, Siswati), Ngwane, Nhlangwini (S405), Phuthi (S404)	Ownby 1985; Mzamane 1948
S40: Nguni group	S44	nde	Ndebele of Zimbabwe (Sindebele, Ndebele, Tebele)	Ownby 1985
S50: Tswa-Rhonga group	S51	tsc	Tswa (Xitswa), Dzibi (S51A), Dzonga (S51B), Hlengwe (S511, Khambana-Makwakwe, Khambani, Lengwe, Lhengwe, Makwakwe-Khambana, Shilengwe)	Persson 1932
S50: Tswa-Rhonga group	S52/53	tso	Tsonga (Songa, Thonga, Tonga, Tsonga), Changana (Xichangana, Shangaan, Shangana), Xiluleke (S53A, Mhinga, Makuleke), N’walungu (S53B, Shingwalungu), Hlave (S53C), Nkuna (S53D), Gwamba (S53E (=S52), Gwapa), Nhlanganu (S53F, Shihlanganu), Djonga (S53G, Jonga), Bila (S53H)	Baumbach 1970
S50: Tswa-Rhonga group	S54	rng	Ronga (Gironga, Shironga), Landim (Landina), Konde, Xonga	Baumbach 1970
S60: Copi group	S61	cce	Copi (Chopi, Cicopi, Shichopi, Txopi), Lenge (S611, Xilenge, Lengue, Kilenge)	Bailey 1976; Lanham 1955
S60: Copi group	S62	toh	Tonga (Gitonga), Shengwe	

== See also ==
- Bantu languages
- Guthrie classification of Bantu languages
- Classification of Pygmy languages
- List of endangered languages in Africa
