= Gunu language =

Mbam language spoken in Cameroon

Gunu
- Nugunu
- Native to: Cameroon
- Ethnicity: Yambassa
- Native speakers: (35,000 cited 1987)
- Language family: Niger–Congo?: Atlantic–Congo; Volta–Congo; Benue–Congo; Bantoid; Southern Bantoid; Bantu; Mbam–Bubi; Mbam–Nubaca; Mbam; Bati–Mbure–Yambassa; Mbure–Yambassa; Yambassa; Mmala–Elip–Gunu; Elip–Gunu; Gunu

Language codes
- ISO 639-3: yas
- Glottolog: nugu1242
- Guthrie code: A.622

The Gunu language (Nu Gunu or Nugunu) is a Southern Bantoid language of Cameroon.
