= Mbola =

Mbola may refer to:

- Mbola, Cameroon, a village in the Centre Province of Cameroon
- Mbola, Tanzania, a cluster of Millennium Villages in the Uyui district of Tanzania
- Emmanuel Mbola, a Zambian international footballer
- Lola Mbola, fictional female character in Robotboy
- Mbule language, a southern Bantoid language spoken by a few people in central Cameroon
- Mbole people, an ethnic group living in the Orientale Province, Democratic Republic of the Congo
