= Central Yambasa language =

Southern Bantoid language spoken in Cameroon

Central Yambasa
- Native to: Cameroon
- Ethnicity: Yambassa
- Native speakers: (17,000 cited 1982–2014)
- Language family: Niger–Congo?: Atlantic–Congo; Volta–Congo; Benue–Congo; Bantoid; Southern Bantoid; Bantu; Mbam–Bubi; Mbam–Nubaca; Mbam; Bati–Mbure–Yambassa; Mbure–Yambassa; Central Yambasa

Language codes
- ISO 639-3: Variously: ekm – Elip mmu – Mmaala yav – Yangben
- Glottolog: elip1238 Elip mmaa1238 Mmaala yang1293 Nuasue
- Guthrie code: A.62

Central Yambasa or Nuasua (Nuaswa) is a Southern Bantoid language of Cameroon.
