= Yat (disambiguation) =

Yat (Ѣ, ѣ) is a letter in the Early Cyrillic alphabet.

Yat. or YAT, may also refer to:

== People ==
- Chao Yat (born 1968), Hong Kong comics artist
- Moy Yat (1938–2001), Chinese artist
- Yun Yat (1934–1997), Kampuchean politician
- Yat Hwaidi, Khmer politician
- Yat Malmgren (1916–2002), Swedish dancer and acting teacher
- Ponhea Yat (1394–1463), last king of the Khmer Empire
- Yat Ahk I, third king of Mayan city-state Piedras Negras in Guatemala

== Places ==
- Symonds Yat, a village on the River Wye in Herefordshire, UK

== Transport ==
- YAT, the IATA code for Attawapiskat Airport in Ontario, Canada
- YAT, the MTR code for Yau Tong station in Hong Kong, China
- YAT, the National Rail code for Yatton railway station in North Somerset, UK

== Other uses ==
- Yat, a dialect of New Orleans English
- Sodam Yat, a DC Comics superhero
- YAT Anshin! Uchū Ryokō, an anime series
- yat, ISO 639-3 code of the Yambeta language of Cameroon
- yat, a substituted form of þat, which is a Middle English spelling of that
- Anti-Terror Units (Kurdish: Yekîneyên Antî Teror, short: YAT), special forces of the Syrian Democratic Forces composed of members from the People's Defense Units (YPG) and Women's Protection Units (YPJ)
- York Archaeological Trust, a British charity
