= Leti language (Cameroon) =

Bantu language of Cameroon

Leti
- Native to: Cameroon
- Ethnicity: Mengisa
- Native speakers: "small population" (2014) ritual L2 use
- Language family: Niger–Congo?: Atlantic–Congo; Volta–Congo; Benue–Congo; Bantoid; Southern Bantoid; Bantu; Mbam–Bube; Mbam–Nubaca; Mbam; Sanaga–West Mbam; Sanaga; Leti

Language codes
- ISO 639-3: Either: leo – Leti mct – Mengisa (duplicate code)
- Glottolog: leti1245
- Guthrie code: A.63 (Mengisa)

Leti, or Mangisa, is a Bantu language of Cameroon, spoken by the Mengisa people. Most Mengisa have switched to the Eton language, though a number of them continue to use Leti as a secret ritual language. A smaller number speak Leti as their mother tongue.

Leti is quite close to Tuki and may be a dialect. It is also closely related to Eton.

Mengisa is spoken in the northern part of Sa'a commune (in Lekié department, Central Region).
