= Ki language =

Mbam language spoken in Cameroon

Ki
- Tuki
- Native to: Cameroon
- Native speakers: (26,000 cited 1982)
- Language family: Niger–Congo?: Atlantic–Congo; Volta–Congo; Benue–Congo; Bantoid; Southern Bantoid; Bantu; Mbam–Bube; Mbam–Nubaca; Mbam; Sanaga–West Mbam; Sanaga; Ki

Language codes
- ISO 639-3: bag – inclusive code Individual codes: leo – Leti mct – Mengisa (duplicate code)
- Glottolog: tuki1240
- Guthrie code: A.601 (ex-A.61,64), possibly also A.63

The Ki language, Tuki (Baki, Oki), is a Mbam language of Cameroon. It is spoken by 26,000 people in the Central Province of Cameroon, in the Lekie division and in the Mbam and Kim division, along the Sanaga river.

The dialects are Kombe (Tukombe), Cenga (Tocenga), Tsinga (Tutsingo), Bundum, Njo (Tonjo), Ngoro (Tu Ngoro), Mbere (Tumvele) and possibly Leti/Mengisa and Mbwasa.

== Phonology ==
Tuki distinguishes six phonetic vowels. It distinguishes between long and short vowels.

Vowels
	Front	Back
Close	i	u
Close-mid	e	o
Open-mid		ɔ
Open	a	

The consonants are as follows.

Consonants
		Bilabial	Alveolar	Palatal	Velar/Glottal	Labiovelar
Stop/Affricate	Voiceless	p	t	t͡ʃ	k	k͡p
Stop/Affricate	Voiced	b	d	d͡ʒ	g	g͡b
Stop/Affricate	Prenasalized	ⁿb	ⁿd	ⁿd͡ʒ	ⁿg <ng>	ⁿg͡b
Fricative	Voiceless		s		h	
Fricative	Voiced	β				
Nasal		m	n	ɲ <ny>	ŋ <ng>	
Approximant			ɾ	j		w

== Grammar ==
As in most Bantu languages, the noun consists of a class prefix and a stem. Verbs are conjugated for the noun class of the subject and object. The primary word order is SVO.
