= Akwa =

Akwa may refer to:

== People ==
- Akwá, Fabrice Akwa (born 1977), Angolan footballer
- Obed Akwa, Ghanaian soldier
- People from Akwa Ibom, Nigeria
- People from Akwa Akpa, Nigeria

== Places ==
- Akwa, Douala, a district in Douala, Cameroon
  - Stade Akwa, a multi-use stadium in Douala, Cameroon
- Akwa Ibom State, a Nigerian state
- Akwa Akpa, a city-state in present-day Nigeria

== Other uses ==
- Akwa Group, a Moroccan conglomerate
- Akwa language, a Bantu language of the Republic of Congo
