= Bonek =

Bonek may refer to:

- Jannis Bonek, Austrian orienteering competitor
- Bonek language, from Cameroon
- A nickname for the supporters of Indonesian football club Persebaya Surabaya
