= Sa'a, Cameroon =

Sa'a
- Location in Cameroon
- Coordinates: 4°21′54″N 11°26′24″E
- Country: Cameroon
- Province: Centre Province

Sa'a is a town located in the Centre Province of Cameroon, within the Lekie division.

Sa'a is a small town composed of two main ethnic groups: Eton and Manguissa.

Both ethnic groups speak the Eton and Manguissa languages, which are very similar, and people from the two ethnic groups can converse without the need of a translator.

A small community of around 50 to 60 people has begun to practice Judaism in Sa'a, but they have not yet formally converted. This group of former Christians is known as Beth Yeshourun. They have begun to collect materials in order to construct a synagogue.

The Cameroonian author Severin Cecile Abega was born in Sa'a.

== See also ==
- Communes of Cameroon
- History of the Jews in Cameroon
