= Nyokon language =

Mbam language of Cameroon

Nyokon
- Nyo'o
- Native to: Cameroon
- Native speakers: (3,900 cited 1956 [sic])
- Language family: Niger–Congo?: Atlantic–Congo; Volta–Congo; Benue–Congo; Bantoid; Southern Bantoid; Bantu; Mbam–Bube; Mbam–Nubaca; Mbam; Sanaga–West Mbam; West Mbam; Mandi–Nen–Nyokon; Nyokon

Language codes
- ISO 639-3: nvo
- Glottolog: nyok1243
- Guthrie code: A.45

The Nyokon language, also known as Nyo'o (ninyɔ̃'ɔ̃), is a Mbam language of Cameroon.
