= Abega =

Abega is a surname. Notable people with the surname include:

- Théophile Abega (1954–2012), Cameroonian footballer and politician
- Severin Cecile Abega (1955–2008), Cameroonian author, anthropologist, and researcher
