= Lalia =

Lalia may refer to:

- Laila Ali, the daughter of Muhammad Ali
- LALIA, the Late Antique Little Ice Age
- Lalia language, a Bantu language of the Democratic Republic of Congo

== See also ==
- Coprolalia, involuntary utterance of obscene words
- Glossolalia, vocalizing of fluent speech-like but unintelligible utterances
- Echolalia, the repetition of vocalizations made by another person
- Palilalia, the repetition or echoing of one's own spoken words
- Colisa lalia, dwarf gourami, a fish
