= Bokito =

Bokito may refer to:

- Bokito, Cameroon
- Bokito (gorilla)
