= Nokonoko =

Nokonoko has multiple meanings, including

- The Japanese name for the Mario series enemy, Koopa Troopa
- A kind of tree found in Fiji
- A district of Fiji located in the Ra Province
- A word in the Bube language to mean monster, spirit, or evil spirit

It can also be a romanization of a Japanese word のこのこ.
