= Mandi language =

Mbam language of Cameroon

Mandi
- Lémandé
- Nomaande
- Native to: Cameroon
- Native speakers: (6,000 cited 1982)
- Language family: Niger–Congo?: Atlantic–Congo; Volta–Congo; Benue–Congo; Bantoid; Southern Bantoid; Bantu; Mbam–Bube; Mbam–Nubaca; Mbam; Sanaga–West Mbam; West Mbam; Mandi–Nen–Nyokon; Mandi

Language codes
- ISO 639-3: lem
- Glottolog: noma1260
- Guthrie code: A.46

The Mandi language, Nomaande (also Lemande or Maande), is an Mbam language of Cameroon.
