= Nen language (Cameroon) =

Mbam language spoken in Cameroon

Nen
- Tunen
- Native to: Cameroon
- Ethnicity: 40,000 (1987 census) to 100,000+ (1997) including those outside the traditional area
- Language family: Niger–Congo?: Atlantic–Congo; Volta–Congo; Benue–Congo; Bantoid; Southern Bantoid; Bantu; Mbam–Bube; Mbam–Nubaca; Mbam; Sanaga–West Mbam; West Mbam; Mandi–Nen–Nyokon; Nen
- Dialects: Tunen; Aling'a

Language codes
- ISO 639-3: tvu
- Glottolog: tune1261
- Guthrie code: A.44,441

The Nen language, Tunen (Banen), is a Mbam language of Cameroon. Maho (2009) considers Aling'a to be a distinct language. Unlike all other Bantu languages, Nen has an SOV word order rather than the standard Bantu SVO word order.
