= Voove =

Voove may refer to:

- Bubi people, also called Voove, an ethnic group inhabiting Bioko Island in Equatorial Guinea
- Bube language, the language of the Bubi people, one dialect of which is called eVoové
