= Yambeta language =

Mbam language of Cameroon

Yambeta
- Native to: Cameroon
- Native speakers: (3,700 cited 1982)
- Language family: Niger–Congo?: Atlantic–Congo; Volta–Congo; Benue–Congo; Bantoid; Southern Bantoid; Bantu; Mbam–Bube; Mbam–Nubaca; Mbam; Sanaga–West Mbam; West Mbam; Yambeta

Language codes
- ISO 639-3: yat
- Glottolog: yamb1252
- Guthrie code: A.462

Yambeta or Nigi is a Mbam language of Cameroon. Yambeta has four dialects. The two main dialects are Nigii and Nɛdɛk, and the two lesser dialects are Begi (a subdialect of Nigii) and Nibum (a subdialect of Nɛdɛk). Nigii is the largest dialect, and the one used in this article.

== Phonology ==
=== Consonants ===
There are 20 contrastive consonants in Yambeta.

			Labial	Alveolar	Palatal	Velar	Glottal
Nasal			m	n	ɲ	ŋ	
Plosive/ Affricate	oral	voiceless	p	t	t͡ʃ	k	ʔ
Plosive/ Affricate	prenasal	voiceless		ⁿt		ᵑk	
Plosive/ Affricate	prenasal	voiced	ᵐb	ⁿd		ᵑg	
Fricative			f	s			h
Approximant				l	j	w	

The glottal stop occurs only in word-final position and is elided intervocalically. All other consonants, except /t͡ʃ/, /w/, and the prenasalized stops, may be word-final. All stops are voiceless word-initially and word-finally and voiced intervocalically. Following a nasal, /p/ is voiced, but /t/ and /k/ are not.

=== Vowels ===
Yambeta has eight vowels, four long and four short. Long vowels are only found in the first syllable of noun and verb roots. The vowel harmony system is based on advanced and retracted tongue root.

	-ATR						+ATR					
	Front		Central		Back		Front		Central		Back	
	short	long	short	long	short	long	short	long	short	long	short	long
Close	ɪ	ɪː			ʊ	ʊː	i	iː			u	uː
Mid					ɔ	ɔː					o	oː
Open			ə	əː					a	aː		

If two dissimilar vowels form a vowel sequence across morphemes and the first is close, it becomes a glide, e.g., [pʷǒŋ] 'bees' from /pù-óŋ/. Vowels become or remain identical across morpheme boundaries, e.g., [pə̀ə̀n] 'strangers, visitors' from /pà-ə̀n/. Within roots, vowel sequences are attested with a close first vowel and a second vowel of any height, e.g., /nù-sìòŋ/ 'goliath frog'.

=== Tone ===
Yambeta contrasts high and low tone. These tones are both lexical and grammatical.

=== Phonotactics ===
The most common noun syllable structure is CVC.
