= Bwenyi language =

Bantu language of the Republic of Congo

Bwenyi
- Native to: Congo
- Language family: Niger–Congo?: Atlantic–Congo; Benue–Congo; Bantoid; Bantu (Zone C); Mboshi (C.20)?; Bwenyi

Language codes
- ISO 639-3: None (mis)
- Glottolog: None
- Guthrie code: C.201

Bwenyi is a minor Bantu language of the Republic of Congo.
