= Tuotomb language =

Mbam language of Cameroon

Tuotomb
- Bonek
- Native to: Cameroon
- Native speakers: 1,000 (2007)
- Language family: Niger–Congo?: Atlantic–Congo; Volta–Congo; Benue–Congo; Bantoid; Southern Bantoid; Bantu; Mbam–Bube; Mbam–Nubaca; Mbam; Sanaga–West Mbam; West Mbam; Tuotomb

Language codes
- ISO 639-3: ttf
- Glottolog: tuot1238
- Guthrie code: A.461
- ELP: Tuotomb

Tuotomb, or Bonek, is a Mbam language of Cameroon. Its speakers can be found in Bonek near Ndikinemeki, Cameroon. It is classified as endangered by Ethnologue.
