= Mbule language =

Endangered Southern Bantoid language of Cameroon

Mbule
- Region: southwestern Cameroon
- Ethnicity: Yambassa
- Native speakers: 110 (2009)
- Language family: Niger–Congo?: Atlantic–Congo; Volta–Congo; Benue–Congo; Bantoid; Southern Bantoid; Bantu; Mbam–Bubi; Mbam–Nubaca; Mbam; Bati–Mbure–Yambassa; Mbure–Yambassa; Mbule

Language codes
- ISO 639-3: mlb
- Glottolog: mbul1262
- Guthrie code: A.623

Mbule, also called Dumbule or Mbola, is an endangered Southern Bantoid language spoken by a few people in central Cameroon.

The language is spoken in Mbola village in the South Bokito commune, Mbam-et-Inoubou department of the Centre Region, Cameroon. As reported in 2009, there were just 110 speakers of the language, none of whom were monolingual.
