= Mboshi languages =

Clade of Bantu languages

Mboshi
- Linguistic classification: Niger–Congo?: Atlantic–Congo; Benue–Congo; Southern Bantoid; Bantu (Zone C.20); Mboshi–Buja?; Mboshi

Language codes
- ISO 639-3: –
- Glottolog: koyo1244

The Mboshi languages are a clade of Bantu languages coded Zone C.20 in Guthrie's classification. According to Nurse & Philippson (2003), apart from Kyba (Kuba), the languages form a valid node. They are:

Kwala, Mbosi, Koyo, Akwa, Mboko

Maho (2009) adds Bwenyi.
