= Mbam languages =

Group of Bantu languages of southwestern Cameroon, Gabon, and Equatorial Guinea

Mbam
- Mbam–Bubi
- Geographic distribution: Southwestern Cameroon, Equatorial Guinea, Gabon
- Linguistic classification: Niger–Congo?: Atlantic–Congo; Volta–Congo; Benue–Congo; Bantoid; Southern Bantoid; Bantu; Mbam
- Proto-language: Proto-Mbam

Language codes
- Glottolog: mbam1254 (Mbam-Bubi)
- The Mbam languages shown within Cameroon

The Mbam languages are a group of Bantu languages spoken in Cameroon. They are divided between the Bube language and Mbam proper, which is itself divided into three groups:

- Sanaga (A60): Tuki (Bacenga), Leti/Mengisa, Mbwasa
- West Mbam (A40): Bati (A60), Nomaande (Mandi)–Tunen (Aling'a, Banen)–Tuotomb–Yambeta, Nyokon
- Yambasa (A60): Nubaca, Mbule, Nugunu, Elip–Mmaala–Yangben

Glottolog divides the Mbam–Bubi languages as follows:

- Mbam–Bubi
  - Bube
  - Mbam
    - Nubaca
    - Nuclear Mbam
      - Bati–Mbure–Yambassa
        - Bati (Cameroon)
        - Mbure–Yambassa
          - Mbule
          - Yambassa (A.60)
            - Nuasue
            - Mmala–Elip–Gunu
              - Mmaala
              - Elip–Gunu
                - Elip
                - Nugunu (Cameroon)
      - Sanaga–West Mbam (A.40)
        - Sanaga (A.60)
          - Leti (Cameroon)
          - Tuki
        - West Mbam (A.40)
          - Tuotomb
          - Yambeta
          - Mandi–Nyokon
            - Nomaande
            - Nyokon
            - Tunen
