= Kombe language =

Bantu language spoken in Equatorial Guinea

Kombe
- Ngumbi
- Native to: Equatorial Guinea
- Ethnicity: Kombe people
- Native speakers: 9,200 (2011)
- Language family: Niger–Congo?: Atlantic–Congo; Benue–Congo; Bantoid; Bantu (Zone A); Sawabantu (A.30); Yasa?; Kombe

Language codes
- ISO 639-3: nui
- Glottolog: ngum1255
- Guthrie code: A.33b

The Kombe language, or Ngumbi, is a Coastal Bantu language spoken by the Kombe people of Equatorial Guinea, one of the Ndowe peoples of the coast. It is mutually intelligible with Yasa.

== Phonology ==
=== Consonants ===
		Labial	Alveolar	Palatal	Velar	Glottal
Plosive	voiceless	p	t	c	k	
Plosive	prenasal vl.	ᵐp	ⁿt	ᶮc	ᵑk	
Plosive	voiced	b	d	ɟ	ɡ	
Plosive	prenasal vd.	ᵐb	ⁿd	ᶮɟ	ᵑɡ	
Fricative	voiceless	f	s			h
Fricative	voiced	v	z			
Nasal		m	n	ɲ	ŋ	
Trill			r			
Approximant		w	l	j		

=== Vowels ===
	Front	Central	Back
Close	i iː		u uː
Mid	e eː		o oː
Open		a aː	
