= Yat Hwaidi =

Thai politician

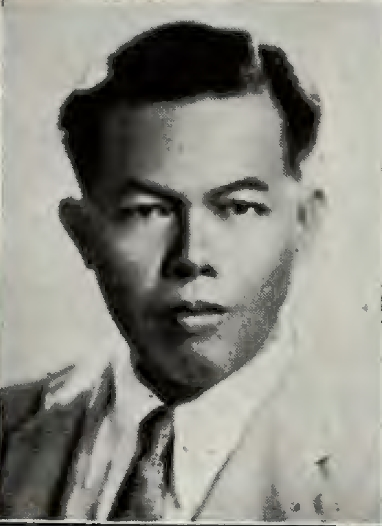
Yat Hwaidi

Yat Hwaidi (Thai: ญาติ ไหวดี; RTGS: Yat Wai-di) was a Khmer politician, born in Surin province, Thailand. During the Second World War, he was the local education supervisor of the Thai administration in Siem Reap. He also represented the Phibunsongkhram Province (Siem Reap) in the parliament of Thailand. After the war, he joined the Khmer Issarak and pledged allegiance to Dap Chhuon and Kao Tak.
