= Kwala language =

Bantu language of the Republic of Congo

Kwala
- Likwala
- Native to: Congo
- Native speakers: (45,000 cited 2000)
- Language family: Niger–Congo?: Atlantic–Congo; Benue–Congo; Bantoid; Bantu (Zone C); Mboshi languages (C.20); Kwala

Language codes
- ISO 639-3: kwc
- Glottolog: likw1239
- Guthrie code: C.26

Kwala (Likwala) is a Bantu language of the Republic of Congo.
