= Mbosi language =

Language

Mbosi
- Mbochi
- Native to: Republic of Congo
- Ethnicity: Mbosi
- Native speakers: (110,000 cited 2000)
- Language family: Niger–Congo?: Atlantic–Congo; Benue–Congo; Bantoid; Bantu (Zone C); Mboshi languages (C.20); Mbosi

Language codes
- ISO 639-3: mdw
- Glottolog: mbos1242
- Guthrie code: C.25

Mbosi or Mbochi (Mboshi) is a Bantu language spoken by the Mbosi people in the Republic of Congo.

== Phonology ==
=== Consonants ===
		Labial	Alveolar		Palatal	Velar
Nasal		m	n		ɲ	
Plosive/ Affricate	plain	p	t	ts		k
Plosive/ Affricate	voiced	b	d	dz		
Plosive/ Affricate	prenasal	ᵐb	ⁿd	ⁿdz		ᵑɡ
Fricative		f	s			
Lateral			l			
Approximant		β̞			j	w

=== Vowels ===
	Front	Central	Back
Close	i		u
Close-mid	e		o
Open-mid	ɛ		ɔ
Open		a	
