= Yasa language =

Bantu language spoken in Cameroon and Equatorial Guinea

Yasa
- Bongwe
- Iyasa
- Native to: Cameroon; Equatorial Guinea; Gabon
- Ethnicity: Yasa and Pygmies
- Native speakers: (2,400 in Cameroon and Equatorial Guinea cited 2000–2011) unknown number in Gabon
- Language family: Niger–Congo?: Atlantic–Congo; Benue–Congo; Bantoid; Bantu (Zone A); Sawabantu (A.30); Kombe?; Yasa

Language codes
- ISO 639-3: yko
- Glottolog: yasa1242
- Guthrie code: A.33a
- ELP: Iyasa
- Yasa is classified as Definitely Endangered by the UNESCO Atlas of the World's Languages in Danger.

Iyasa (Yasa, Yassa) is a Bantu language spoken in Cameroon and Equatorial Guinea by the Iyasa and Ndowe coastal fishing peoples. It is also spoken by Pygmies, perhaps Babongo, in Gabon. Approximately 3,000 people speak Iyasa, though some note that this number may be an overestimation.

Iyasa also goes by the names Bongwe, Lyaasa, and Maasa. Dialects are Bweko, Vendo, Bodele, Marry, One, Asonga, Bomui, Mogana, Mooma, Mapanga. It may in turn be a dialect of Kombe. Speakers report that Kombe and Iyasa are almost perfectly mutually intelligible.

== Classification ==
Dieu and Renaud (1993) classify Iyasa as a Sawabantu language (A.30 in Guthrie classification).

== Geographic Distribution ==
Iyasa is spoken along the coast of Cameroon south of Kribi, including in the city of Campo. It is also spoken across the Ntem River in Equatorial Guinea. The northernmost Iyasa village is Lolabe, 31 km south of Kribi.

== Phonology ==
Iyasa has a seven-vowel system:

Monophthong phonemes
	Front	Central	Back
Close	i		u
Close-mid	e		o
Open-mid	ɛ		ɔ
Open		a	

It also has 22 phonemic consonants:

		Labial	Alveolar	Post- alveolar	Palatal	Velar	Glottal
Nasal		m	n		ɲ	ŋ	
Plosive/ Affricate	voiceless	p	t	tʃ		k	
Plosive/ Affricate	voiced		d	dʒ	ɟ	ɡ	
Plosive/ Affricate	implosive	ɓ	ɗ				
Fricative		v	s				h
Semivowel		w			j		
Lateral			l				

== Grammar ==
=== Noun classes ===
Iyasa has 12 noun classes, as outlined in the table below (adapted from Bôt 2011 and Bouh Ma Sitna 2004):

Class number	Prefix	Allomorphs	Example (IPA)	Translation (French)	Translation (English)
1	mù-	mʷ-	mù-tʃɛ́tʃɛ́ mw-ánà	le bébé l'enfant	baby child
2	wà-	w-	wà-dó	les femmes	women
3	mò-	m-, mʷ-, ŋ-	mò-ló ŋ-kɔ́jɛ́	la fête le pannier	party basket
4	mè-	m-, mʲ-	mè-kɔ	les panniers	baskets
5	ɗì-	ɗ-, i-, dʒ-	ɗì-lɔ̂ ì-dàkà	l'oreille la maladie	ear illness
6	mà-	m-	mà-lɔ̂	les oreilles	ears
7	è-	èj-	è-lɛ́mi	la langue	tongue
8	ɓè-	ɓèj-	ɓè-kòndà ɓèj-ìmà	les souliers les choses	shoes things
9/10	N-	m-, n-, ŋ-, ɲ-, ø	m-bàdì n-dómì ø-sɔ̀kù	maison(s) père(s) éléphant(s)	house(s) father(s) elephant(s)
13	lì-	l-	lì-ɲɔ̀ní l-éjì	les oiseaux les soleils	birds suns
14	ɓù-	ɓʷ-	ɓù-dù bʷ-àló	l'âne la pirogue	donkey canoe
19	vi-	v-	vì-ɲɔ̀ní	l'oiseau	bird
