= Mbola, Cameroon =

Mbola
- Location in Cameroon
- Coordinates: 4°30′N 11°05′E
- Country: Cameroon
- Province: Centre Province
- Department: Mbam-et-Inoubou
- Commune: Bokito

Mbola is a village in the Bokito commune of the Centre Province of Cameroon. It is home to a small number of people who speak the Mbole language. As of 2007, there were just 100 speakers of this languages, none of whom were monolingual.
