= Severin Cecile Abega =

Cameroonian author and anthropologist (1955–2008)

- Born: 22 November 1955
- Died: 24 March 2008 (aged 52)
- Occupations: author, anthropologist, researcher

Severin Cecile Abega (22 November 1955 – 24 March 2008) was a Cameroonian author, anthropologist and researcher.

== Biography ==
Severin Cecile Abega was born in 1955 at Saa in the South of Cameroon. He died on 24 March 2008 in Yaoundé, the Capital (political and administrative) city of Cameroon.

At the time of his death, he was teaching at the Catholic Institute of Africa, in Yaoundé, Cameroon.

== Bibliography ==
- Les Bimanes (1982)

This is book of seven short stories. They all relate to the humanity, and the social conditions prevalent in the Cameroonian society. Full of humor, Severin Cecile Abega tries to show the society as it is in a formal and informal way. His mastery of the language, and his great sense of humor have made this book a classic of Cameroonian literature, especially taught in high school.

The speaker, whose name is Garba, is a professional salesman of roasted meat commonly known in Cameroon as ‘soya’. In the text, he refuses to sell soya to a nurse who, a couple of days ago, refused to give him medical attention at the hospital when he was suffering from an injury. (this outlines the corruption by which a nurse refuses to serve a patient, because that patient does not have enough money to pay, or is not his relative).

- Le Bourreau (2004)

A man tells the story of his friend who will be executed by a professional who receives his orders from people at the higher echelons of society. Kyrielle, a young lady, tries to see him to plead for the life of her boyfriend, but falls in love with the "bourreau". This book, full of humor, succeeds in relating the desensitization of society in the faces of horror.

- Entre Terre et Ciel
- Contes du Sud du Cameroun: Beme et le fetiche de son pere (2002)
- Societe civile et reduction de la pauvrete
- Les choses de la foret. Les masques des princes Tikar de Nditam
- Le sein t'es pris
- Pygmees Baka
- La latrine (1987)
- Les violences sexuelles et l'État au Cameroun (2007)
- Jankina et autres contes Pygmees (2003)
