= Bati language (Cameroon) =

Mbam language of Cameroon

Bati
- Native to: Cameroon
- Native speakers: (800 cited 1975 census)
- Language family: Niger–Congo?: Atlantic–Congo; Volta–Congo; Benue–Congo; Bantoid; Southern Bantoid; Bantu; Mbam–Bubi; Mbam–Nubaca; Mbam; Bati–Mbure–Yambassa; Bati

Language codes
- ISO 639-3: btc
- Glottolog: bati1251
- Guthrie code: A.65
- ELP: Bati (Cameroon)

Bati is a Mbam language of Cameroon.
