= Mboko language =

Language

Mboko
- Native to: Republic of the Congo
- Native speakers: (27,000 cited 2000)
- Language family: Niger–Congo?: Atlantic–Congo; Benue–Congo; Bantoid; Bantu (Zone C); Mboshi languages (C.20); Mboko
- Dialects: Ngare

Language codes
- ISO 639-3: mdu
- Glottolog: mbok1243
- Guthrie code: C.21 (C.23)

Mboko (Mboxo) is a Bantu language of the Republic of the Congo.
