= Koyo language (Congo) =

Bantu language spoken in Congo Republic

Koyo
- Native to: Republic of Congo
- Native speakers: (2,980 cited 2000)
- Language family: Niger–Congo?: Atlantic–Congo; Benue–Congo; Bantoid; Bantu (Zone C); Mboshi (C.20); Koyo

Language codes
- ISO 639-3: koh
- Glottolog: koyo1242
- Guthrie code: C.24

Koyo (Ekoyo) is a Bantu language of the Republic of Congo.
