= Akwa language =

Language

Akwa
- Native to: Republic of Congo
- Native speakers: (24,000 cited 2000)
- Language family: Niger–Congo?: Atlantic–Congo; Benue–Congo; Bantoid; Bantu (Zone C); Mboshi (C.20); Akwa

Language codes
- ISO 639-3: akw
- Glottolog: akwa1248
- Guthrie code: C.22

Akwa is a Bantu language of the Republic of Congo.
