= Eton language =

Bantu language spoken in Cameroon

Eton
- Ìtón
- Region: Cameroon
- Native speakers: 1 500 000 (2020 census)
- Language family: Niger–Congo?: Atlantic–Congo; Benue–Congo; Southern Bantoid; Bantu (Zone A); Beti; Eton

Language codes
- ISO 639-3: eto – inclusive code Individual code: mct – Mengisa (duplicate code)
- Glottolog: eton1253
- Guthrie code: A.71

Eton, or Ìtón, is a Bantu language spoken by the Eton people of Cameroon.

It is mutually intelligible with Ewondo, a fact which may have delayed its study for some time.

Eton speakers inhabit the Lekié department of the Centre Region of Cameroon, an area north of the capital Yaoundé bounded in the north by the Sanaga River.

Ethnologue cites four dialects of Eton, but its speakers generally distinguish two, a northern and a southern dialect, the latter of which is closer to the Ewondo language.

The Mengisa people have largely switched to Eton. A small number continue to speak their ancestral language, Leti. It is not clear if the ISO code for "Mengisa" refers to Eton or Leti; Ethnologue classifies Mengisa with Eton, but the code is likely based on Guthrie, who classified it with Leti.

== Phonology ==
Eton is a tone language. It makes use of three tones (low, high and dissimilating high) and floating tones.

=== Consonants ===
		Labial	Alveolar	Palatal	Velar	Labio- velar
Nasal		m	n	ɲ	ŋ	ŋ͡m
Plosive/ Affricate	voiceless	p	t	t͡ʃ	k	k͡p
Plosive/ Affricate	voiced	b	d	d͡ʒ	ɡ	ɡ͡b
Fricative	voiceless		s			
Fricative	voiced	v	z			
Lateral			l			
Approximant				j		w

- Sounds /b, d, ɡ, z/ have sonorant allophones [β, r, ɣ~ɰ, ɦ] when in intervocalic, lenited positions.

=== Vowels ===
	Front	Central	Back
High	i iː		u uː
High-mid	e eː	ə	o oː
Low-mid	ɛ ɛː	ə	ɔ ɔː
Low	a aː		

== Grammar ==
Eton is an SVO language. As is common in Bantu, Eton has a noun class system. There are twelve classes and the class of a noun determines which agreement prefix it receives and triggers. For instance, verbs agree with the subject's noun class.
