= Lalia language =

Language

Lalia
- Native to: DR Congo
- Native speakers: (55,000 cited 1993)
- Language family: Niger–Congo?: Atlantic–Congo; Benue–Congo; Bantoid; Bantu (Zone C); Soko–Kele (C.50–60); Lalia

Language codes
- ISO 639-3: lal
- Glottolog: lali1242
- Guthrie code: C.62

Lalia is a Bantu language of the Democratic Republic of Congo.
