= Bokito, Cameroon =

Bokito in Cameroon
- Location in Cameroon
- Coordinates: 4°34′N 11°07′E
- Country: Cameroon
- Province: Centre Province

Government
  - Mayor: OLOUME Ernest

Bokito is a town located in the Mbam-et-Inoubou department of Centre Region of Cameroon. The town is situated approximately 20 km from Bafia, and consists of more than 10 villages: Assala, Bakoa, Begny, Bokaga, Bongando, Okolé, Kedia, Ossimb I, Ossimb II, Tchekos, Yorro, Tobagne and Omeng. The Yambassa are the town's primary ethnic group. Other groups include Lemandé (Tchekos) and Mma'ala (Omende, Yangben) in Bafia. The town has a sub-divisional health center known as CMA de Bokito, a library, a micro-finance bank, a western union, and a market that is active on Mondays. The town also has a public library, two high schools, and shops in and around the center of the town.
