= Baca language =

Bantu language spoken in Cameroon

Baca
- Nubaca
- Native to: Cameroon
- Native speakers: 4,500 (2007)
- Language family: Niger–Congo?: Atlantic–Congo; Volta–Congo; Benue–Congo; Bantoid; Southern Bantoid; Bantu; Mbam–Bube; Mbam–Nubaca; Baca

Language codes
- ISO 639-3: baf
- Glottolog: nuba1241
- Guthrie code: A.621
- ELP: Nubaca

The Baca language, Nubaca, is a Bantu language of Cameroon spoken in the village of Bongo, in the Bokito subdivision.

== Phonology ==
=== Consonants ===
The following table shows the consonants of Baca.

Baca consonants
		Labial	Alveolar	Palatal	Velar
Nasal		m	n	ɲ	ŋ
Stop	voiceless	p	t		k
Stop	prenasalised	ᵐb	ⁿd		ᵑg
Fricative	voiceless	f	s		h
Fricative	prenasalised	^{ɱ}f	ⁿs		
Approximant			l	j	w

=== Vowels ===
Baca vowels
	Front		Central		Back	
	short	long	short	long	short	long
Close	i	iː			u	uː
Near-close	ɪ	ɪː			ʊ	ʊː
Close-mid	e				o	oː
Open-mid	ɛ	ɛː			ɔ	ɔː
Open			a	aː		

Baca distinguishes length in all vowels except /e/. Baca also exhibits vowel harmony based on tongue root position, separating vowels into two categories, /i u e o/ [+ATR] and /ɪ ʊ ɛ ɔ a/ [-ATR], and requires that vowels in the noun root agree in tongue root position. [-ATR] and [+ATR] vowels never occur in the same root, except /a/ which can appear in [+ATR] environments and is realized as [ɜ].

=== Tone ===
Baca has an underlying two tone system, high and low.
