= Bube language =

Bantu or Bantoid language of Equatorial Guinea

Bube
- Idioma Bubé
- Bubi, Bohobé, Bube–Benga, Bobe
- Native to: Equatorial Guinea, Gabon, Cameroon
- Region: Bioko Island, Río Muni (only spoken by minority)
- Ethnicity: Bubi, Wovea
- Native speakers: 51,000 (2011)
- Language family: Niger–Congo?: Atlantic–Congo; Volta–Congo; Benue–Congo; Bantoid; Southern Bantoid; Bantu; Mbam–Bube; Bube
- Early form: Pre-Bube

Official status
- Recognised minority language in: Equatorial Guinea: Bioko Island

Language codes
- ISO 639-3: bvb – inclusive code Individual code: bbx – Bubia (Wovea)
- Glottolog: bube1242
- Guthrie code: A.31, A.221
- ELP: Bubia
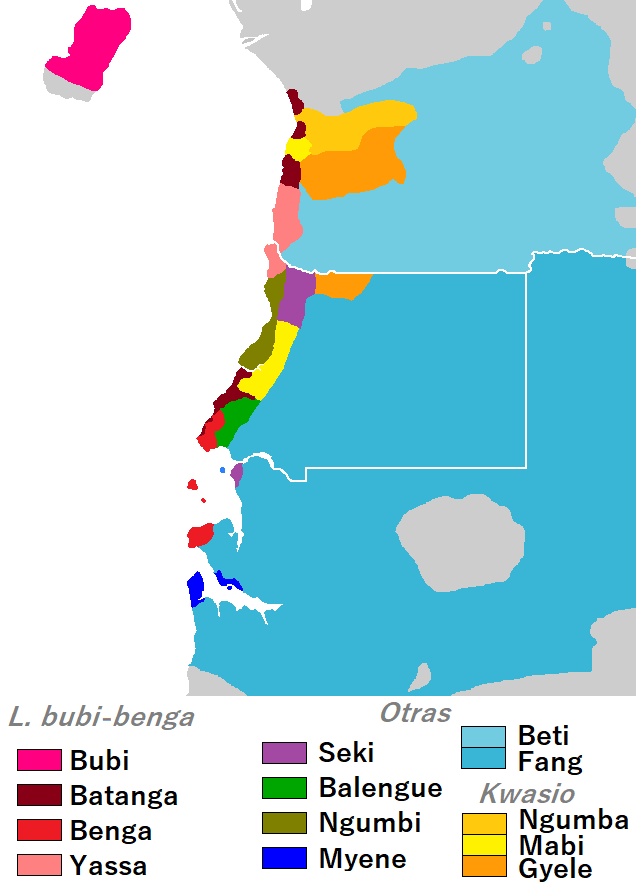
- Lenguas de Guinea Ecuatorial (Bube (pink)

The Bube language or Bubi, Bohobé, Bube–Benga or Etyö is a Bantu language spoken predominantly by the Bubi, a Bantu people native to, and once the primary inhabitants of Bioko Island in Equatorial Guinea. The language was brought to Bioko from continental Africa more than three thousand years ago when the Bubi began settling on the island.

It has around 50,000 speakers, with three variants: North, South and Central-East. It is noted for its tonal character and the divergence of words by gender. The language is also spoken by the Bubi native to Gabon and Cameroon.

The Bube language is divided into six different dialects that vary in the northern and southern regions of Bioko Island. For example, in the North, people speak Rebola and its variations: Basile, Banapa and Basupa. However, in the North-East, Bakake is spoken.

Bube is also spoken in a small area on the mainland closest to the island, where speakers are shifting to Wumboko. This has been reported as "Bube", "Bubia" or "Wovea" (see Wovea people).

The first works on the Bube language were those of the Baptist missionary John Clarke, published in 1846 and 1848. A later Bube-to-English primer was authored in 1875 by William Barleycorn, a colonial era Primitive Methodist missionary of Igbo and Fernandino descent, while he was serving in the Bubi village of Basupu. An official language dictionary and grammar guide was published by the ethnic Bubi scholar Justo Bolekia Boleká.

== Other names ==
Other names and forms of the name include Bubé, eVoové, eBubée, Bhubhi, Bubi, Ibubi, Ibhubhi, Pove and Eviia.

== Phonology ==
=== Vowels ===
Bube has 7 vowels that can be either short or long:

Vowel phonemes
	Front	Back
Close	i	u
Close-mid	e	o
Open-mid	ɛ	ɔ
Open	a	

All vowels also have nasal articulations as allophones.

=== Consonants ===
Bube has 29 consonants. Some of them are prenasalized:

Consonant Phonemes
			Labial	Dental/ Alveolar	Palatal	Velar	Glottal
Nasal		voiceless	m̥	n̥			
Nasal		voiced	m	n	ɲ		
Stop	plain	voiceless	p	t	c	k	ʔ
Stop	plain	voiced	b	d	ɟ	ɡ	ʔ
Stop	prenasal	voiceless	ᵐp	ⁿt	ᶮc		
Stop	prenasal	voiced	ᵐb	ⁿd	ᶮɟ		
Fricative		voiceless	f	s			h
Fricative		voiced	v				
Fricative		prenasal		ⁿs			
Approximant				l	j	w	
Rhotic				r			

== Numbers ==
The numbers one through ten in Bube are as follows:

Number	Northern Bube	Northwestern Bube	Southern Bube
1	buule		muule
2	eppa		memba
3	betta		metta
4	yeele		myeeme
5	betto		metto
6	ra'a 6		metto na muule 5+1
7	ra'a la buule 6+1		metto na memba 5+2
8	yeele ketoppa 4x2	ra'a la eppa 6+2	metto na metta 5+3
9	yeele ketoppa la buule 4x2+1	baa buule ka yo 10-1	metto na myeene 5+4
10	yo		myo

== Bibliography ==
- Biddulph, Joseph, Fernandian (1988). The Bubi Bantu language of Bioco/Fernando Po. Pontypridd, Wales: Languages Information Centre, WorldCat no. 17838738.
- Bolekia, Justo Bolekia (1991). Curso de lengua bubi. (Coleccion ensayos, 8.) Malabo: Centro Cultural Hispano-Guineano.
- Bolekia, Justo (2009). Diccionario español-bubi. Madrid: Ediciones AKAL. 544pp.
- Clarke, John (1846). Sentences in the Fernandian Tongue. Dunfermline Press, Bimbia.
- Clarke, John (1848). Introduction To The Fernandian Tongue, Part 1. Berwick-on-Tweed.
