= Languages of Africa =

Map showing the traditional language families, subfamilies and major languages spoken in Africa

The number of languages natively spoken in Africa is variously estimated (depending on the delineation of language vs. dialect) at between 1,250 and 2,100, and by some counts at over 3,000. Nigeria alone has over 500 languages (according to SIL Ethnologue), one of the greatest concentrations of linguistic diversity in the world. The languages of Africa belong to many distinct language families, among which the largest are:

- Niger–Congo, which include the large Atlantic-Congo and Bantu branches in West, Central, Southeast and Southern Africa.
- Afroasiatic languages are spread throughout Western Asia, North Africa, the Horn of Africa and parts of West Africa and the Sahel.
- Saharan, Nilotic and Central Sudanic languages (grouped under the hypothetical Nilo-Saharan macro-family), are present in East Africa and Sahel.
- Austronesian languages are spoken in Madagascar and parts of the Comoros.
- Khoe–Kwadi languages are spoken mostly in Namibia and Botswana.
- Indo-European languages, while not indigenous to Africa, are spoken in South Africa and Namibia (Afrikaans, English, German) and are used as lingua francas in Liberia and the former colonies of the United Kingdom (English), former colonies of France and of Belgium (French), former colonies of Portugal (Portuguese), former colonies of Italy (Italian), former colonies of Spain (Spanish) and the current Spanish territories of Ceuta, Melilla and the Canary Islands and the current French territories of Mayotte and La Réunion.

There are several other small families and language isolates, as well as creoles and languages that have yet to be classified. In addition, Africa has a wide variety of sign languages, many of which are language isolates.

Around a hundred languages are widely used for interethnic communication. These include Arabic, Berber, Swahili, Amharic, Oromo, Igbo, Somali, Hausa, Manding, Fulani, Zulu, Shona, Akan/Twi, Malagasy, and Yoruba, which are spoken as a second (or non-first) language by millions of people. Although many African languages are used on the radio, in newspapers and in primary-school education, and some of the larger ones are considered national languages, only a few are official at the national level. Arabic predominates as the official language across North Africa, and several Sahelian nations have recently granted official status to native languages, while in Sub-Saharan Africa most official languages at the national level tend to be colonial languages such as French, Portuguese, or English.

The African Union declared 2006 the "Year of African Languages".

== Language groups ==
A rough overview of language families spoken in Africa: Afroasiatic Nilo-Saharan (possibly a family) Niger–Congo (some areas may not belong) Bantu Khoisan (not a family) Indo-European Austronesian

Most languages natively spoken in Africa belong to one of the two large language families that dominate the continent: Afroasiatic, or Niger–Congo. Another hundred belong to smaller families such as Ubangian, Nilotic, Saharan, and the various families previously grouped under the umbrella term Khoisan. In addition, the languages of Africa include several unclassified languages and sign languages.

The earliest Afroasiatic languages are associated with the Capsian culture, the Saharan languages are linked with the Khartoum Mesolithic/Neolithic cultures. Niger-Congo languages are correlated with the west and central African hoe-based farming traditions and the Khoisan languages are matched with the south and southeastern Wilton culture.

=== Afroasiatic languages ===
Afroasiatic languages are spoken throughout North Africa, the Horn of Africa, Western Asia and parts of West Africa and the Sahel. There are approximately 375 Afroasiatic languages spoken by over 400 million people. The main subfamilies of Afroasiatic are Berber, Chadic, Cushitic, Omotic, Egyptian and Semitic. The Afroasiatic Urheimat is uncertain. The family's most extensive branch, the Semitic languages (including Arabic, Amharic and Hebrew among others), is the only branch of Afroasiatic that is spoken outside Africa.

Some of the most widely spoken Afroasiatic languages include Arabic (a Semitic language, and a recent arrival from West Asia), Somali (Cushitic), Berber (Berber), Hausa (Chadic), Amharic (Semitic) and Oromo (Cushitic). Of the world's surviving language families, Afroasiatic has the longest written history, as both the Akkadian language of Mesopotamia and Ancient Egyptian are members.

=== Nilo-Saharan languages ===
Nilo-Saharan languages are a proposed grouping of some one hundred diverse languages. Genealogical linkage between these languages has failed to be conclusively demonstrated, and support for the proposal is sparse among linguists. The languages share some unusual morphology, but if they are related, most of the branches must have undergone major restructuring since diverging from their common ancestor.

This hypothetical family would reach an expanse that stretches from the Nile Valley to northern Tanzania and into Nigeria and DR Congo, with the Songhay languages along the middle reaches of the Niger River as a geographic outlier. The inclusion of the Songhay languages is questionable, and doubts have been raised over the Koman, Gumuz and Kadu branches.

Some of the better known Nilo-Saharan languages are Kanuri, Fur, Songhay, Nobiin and the widespread Nilotic family, which includes the Luo, Dinka and Maasai. Most Nilo-Saharan languages are tonal, as are Niger-Congo languages.

=== Niger–Congo languages ===
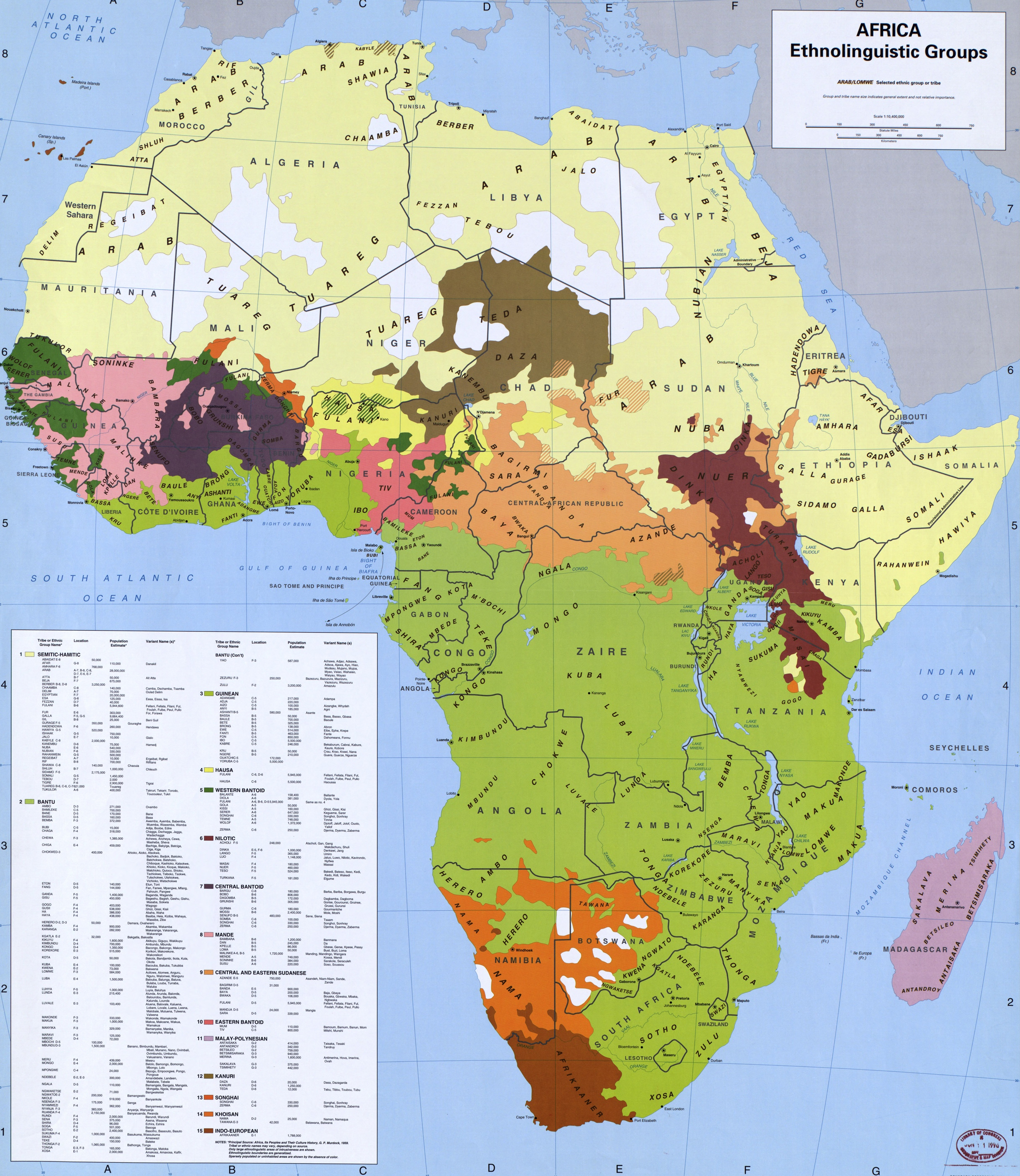
Map showing the geographic language groupings of in Africa: Afroasiatic (Semitic-Hamitic) Austronesian (Malay-Polynesian) Indo-European Khoisan Niger-Congo: Bantu Central and Eastern Sudanese Central Bantoid Eastern Bantoid Guinean Mande Western Bantoid Nilo-Saharan: Saharan Nilotic Songhai

The Niger–Congo languages constitute the largest language family spoken in West Africa and perhaps the world in terms of the number of languages. One of its salient features is an elaborate noun class system with grammatical concord. A large majority of languages of this family are tonal such as Yoruba and Igbo, Akan and Ewe language. A major branch of Niger–Congo languages is the Bantu phylum, which has a wider speech area than the rest of the family (see Niger–Congo B (Bantu) in the map above).

The Niger–Kordofanian language family, joining Niger–Congo with the Kordofanian languages of south-central Sudan, was proposed in the 1950s by Joseph Greenberg. Today, linguists often use "Niger–Congo" to refer to this entire family, including Kordofanian as a subfamily. One reason for this is that it is not clear whether Kordofanian was the first branch to diverge from rest of Niger–Congo. Mande has been claimed to be equally or more divergent. Niger–Congo is generally accepted by linguists, though a few question the inclusion of Mande and Dogon, and there is no conclusive evidence for the inclusion of Ubangian.

=== Other language families ===
Several languages spoken in Africa belong to language families concentrated or originating outside the African continent.

==== Austronesian ====
Malagasy belongs to the Austronesian languages and is the westernmost branch of the family. It is the national and co-official language of Madagascar, and a Malagasy dialect called Bushi is also spoken in Mayotte.

The ancestors of the Malagasy people migrated to Madagascar around 1,500 years ago from Southeast Asia, more specifically the island of Borneo. The origins of how they arrived to Madagascar remains a mystery, however the Austronesians are known for their seafaring culture. Despite the geographical isolation, Malagasy still has strong resemblance to Barito languages especially the Ma'anyan language of southern Borneo.

With more than 20 million speakers, Malagasy is one of the most widely spoken of the Austronesian languages.

==== Indo-European ====
Afrikaans is Indo-European, as is most of the vocabulary of most African creole languages. Afrikaans evolved from the Dutch vernacular of South Holland (Hollandic dialect) spoken by the mainly Dutch settlers of what is now South Africa, where it gradually began to develop distinguishing characteristics in the course of the 18th century, including the loss of verbal conjugation (save for 5 modal verbs), as well as grammatical case and gender. Most Afrikaans speakers live in South Africa. In Namibia it is the lingua franca. Overall 14 to 21 million people are estimated to speak Afrikaans.

Since the colonial era, Indo-European languages such as Afrikaans, English, French, Italian, Portuguese and Spanish have held official status in many countries, and are widely spoken, generally as lingua francas. (See African French and African Portuguese.) Additionally, languages like French, and Portuguese have become native languages in various countries.

French has become native in the urban areas of the DRC, and Gabon. Spanish is spoken as a native language by a small minority in Equatorial Guinea, primarily in larger cities.

German was once used in Germany's colonies there from the late 1800s until World War I, when the United Kingdom and France took over and revoked German's official status. Despite this, German is still spoken in Namibia, mostly among the white population. Although it lost its official status in the 1990s, it has been redesignated as a national language. Indo-Aryan languages such as Gujarati and Sindhi are spoken by South Asian expatriates exclusively. In earlier historical times, other Indo-European languages could be found in various parts of the continent, such as Old Persian and Greek in Egypt, Latin and Vandalic in North Africa and Modern Persian in the Horn of Africa.

==== Small families ====
The three small Khoisan families of southern Africa have not been shown to be closely related to any other major language family. In addition, there are various other families that have not been demonstrated to belong to one of these families. The classifications below follow Glottolog.

- Mande, some 70 languages, including the major languages of Mali and Guinea; these are generally thought to be divergent Niger–Congo, but debate persists
- Ubangian, some 70 languages, centered on the languages of the Central African Republic; may be Niger–Congo
- Ta-Ne-Omotic, some 20 languages, previously classified under Afro-Asiatic, spoken in Ethiopia
- Khoe-Kwadi, around 10 languages, the primary family of Khoisan languages of Namibia and Botswana
- Surmic, some 11 languages, previously classified within either Sudanic or Nilo-Saharan
- Kxʼa, around five languages, with various dialects, spoken in Southern Africa
- South Omotic, around five languages; previously classified within Afro-Asiatic, spoken in Ethiopia
- Tuu, or Taa-ǃKwi, two surviving languages
- Hadza, an isolate of Tanzania
- Bangime, a likely isolate of Mali
- Jalaa, a likely isolate of Nigeria
- Sandawe, an isolate of Tanzania
- Laal, a possible isolate of Chad

Khoisan is a term of convenience covering some 30 languages spoken by around 300,000–400,000 people. There are five Khoisan families that have not been shown to be related to each other: Khoe, Tuu and Kxʼa, which are found mainly in Namibia and Botswana, as well as Sandawe and Hadza of Tanzania, which are language isolates. A striking feature of Khoisan languages, and the reason they are often grouped together, is their use of click consonants. Some neighbouring Bantu languages (notably Xhosa and Zulu) have clicks as well, but these were adopted from Khoisan languages. The Khoisan languages are also tonal.

==== Creole languages ====
Due partly to its multilingualism and its colonial past, a substantial proportion of the world's creole languages are to be found in Africa. Some are based on Indo-European languages (e.g. Krio from English in Sierra Leone and the very similar Pidgin in Nigeria, Ghana and parts of Cameroon; Cape Verdean Creole in Cape Verde and Guinea-Bissau Creole in Guinea-Bissau and Senegal, all from Portuguese; Seychellois Creole in the Seychelles and Mauritian Creole in Mauritius, both from French); some are based on Arabic (e.g. Juba Arabic in South Sudan, or Nubi in parts of Uganda and Kenya); some are based on local languages (e.g. Sango, the main language of the Central African Republic); while in Cameroon a creole based on French, English and local African languages known as Camfranglais has started to become popular.

==== Unclassified languages ====
A fair number of unclassified languages are reported in Africa. Many remain unclassified simply for lack of data; among the better-investigated ones that continue to resist easy classification are:

- possibly Afroasiatic: Ongota
- possibly Nilo-Saharan: Shabo
- possibly Niger–Congo: Jalaa, Mbre, Bayot
- unknown: Laal, Mpre

Of these, Jalaa is perhaps the most likely to be an isolate.

Less-well investigated languages include Irimba, Luo, Mawa, Rer Bare (possibly Bantu languages), Bete (evidently Jukunoid), Bung (unclear), Kujarge (evidently Chadic), Lufu (Jukunoid), Meroitic (possibly Afroasiatic), Oropom (possibly spurious) and Weyto (evidently Cushitic). Several of these are extinct, and adequate comparative data is thus unlikely to be forthcoming. Hombert & Philippson (2009) list a number of African languages that have been classified as language isolates at one point or another. Many of these are simply unclassified, but Hombert & Philippson believe Africa has about twenty language families, including isolates. Beside the possibilities listed above, there are:

- Aasax or Aramanik (Tanzania) (South Cushitic? contains non-Cushitic lexicon)
- Imeraguen (Mauritania) – Hassaniyya Arabic restructured on an Azêr (Soninke) base
- Kara (Fer?) (Central African Republic)
- Oblo (Cameroon) (Adamawa? Extinct?)

Roger Blench notes a couple additional possibilities:

- Defaka (Nigeria)
- Dompo (Ghana)

Below is a list of language isolates and otherwise unclassified languages in Africa, from Vossen & Dimmendaal (2020:434):

Language	Country
Bangi Me	Mali
Bayot	Senegal
Dompo	Ghana
Ega	Ivory Coast
Gomba	Ethiopia
Gumuz	Ethiopia, Sudan
Hadza	Tanzania
Irimba	Gabon
Jalaa	Nigeria
Kujarge	Chad
Laal	Chad
Lufu	Nigeria
Luo	Cameroon
Mawa	Nigeria
Meyobe	Benin, Togo
Mimi of Decorse; Mimi of Nachtigal	Chad
Mpra	Ghana
Oblo	Cameroon
Ongota	Ethiopia
Oropom	Kenya, Uganda
Rer Bare	Ethiopia
Shabo	Ethiopia
Weyto	Ethiopia
Wutana	Nigeria
Yeni	Cameroon

==== Sign languages ====
Many African countries have national sign languages, such as Algerian Sign Language, Tunisian Sign Language, Ethiopian Sign Language. Other sign languages are restricted to small areas or single villages, such as Adamorobe Sign Language in Ghana. Tanzania has seven, one for each of its schools for the Deaf, all of which are discouraged. Not much is known, since little has been published on these languages

Sign language systems extant in Africa include the Paget Gorman Sign System used in Namibia and Angola, the Sudanese Sign languages used in Sudan and South Sudan, the Arab Sign languages used across the Arab Mideast, the Francosign languages used in Francophone Africa and other areas such as Ghana and Tunisia, and the Tanzanian Sign languages used in Tanzania.

== Language in Africa ==
Throughout the long multilingual history of the African continent, African languages have been subject to phenomena like language contact, language expansion, language shift and language death. A case in point is the Bantu expansion, in which Bantu-speaking peoples expanded over most of Sub-Equatorial Africa, intermingling with Khoi-San speaking peoples from much of Southeast Africa and Southern Africa and other peoples from Central Africa. Another example is the Arab expansion in the 7th century, which led to the extension of Arabic from its homeland in Asia, into much of North Africa and the Horn of Africa.

Trade languages are another age-old phenomenon in the African linguistic landscape. Cultural and linguistic innovations spread along trade routes and languages of peoples dominant in trade developed into languages of wider communication (lingua franca). Of particular importance in this respect are Berber (North and West Africa), Jula (western West Africa), Fulfulde (West Africa), Hausa (West Africa), Lingala (Congo), Swahili (Southeast Africa), Somali (Horn of Africa) and Arabic (North Africa and Horn of Africa).

After gaining independence, many African countries, in the search for national unity, selected one language, generally the former Indo-European colonial language, to be used in government and education. However, in recent years, African countries have become increasingly supportive of maintaining linguistic diversity. Language policies that are being developed nowadays are mostly aimed at multilingualism. This presents a methodological complication when collecting data in Africa and limited literature exists. An analysis of Afrobarometer public opinion survey data of 36 countries suggested that survey interviewers and respondents could engage in various linguistic behaviors, such as code-switching during the survey. Moreover, some African countries have been considering removing their official former Indo-European colonial languages, like Mali and Burkina Faso which removed French as an official language in 2024.

=== Official languages ===
Official languages in Africa: Afrikaans / Portuguese; Arabic / Spanish; English / Swahili; French / other African languages

Afroasiatic

- Berber (Amazigh):
  - Standard Moroccan Amazigh in Morocco
  - Standard Algerian Berber in Algeria
  - Tamasheq in Mali
  - Tawellemet in Mali
- Chadic:
  - Hausa in Niger
- Cushitic:
  - Afar in Ethiopia
  - Oromo in Ethiopia and Kenya
  - Somali in Somalia, Ethiopia, Kenya, and Djibouti
- Semitic:
  - Amharic in Ethiopia
  - Arabic in Algeria, Chad, Comoros, Djibouti, Egypt, Libya, Mauritania, Morocco, Somalia, Sudan, Tunisia and Zanzibar (Tanzania)
    - Hassaniya Arabic in Mali
  - Tigrinya in Ethiopia and Eritrea

Austronesian

- Malagasy in Madagascar

Ngbandi creole

- Sango in the Central African Republic

French Creole

- Seychelles Creole in Seychelles

Indo-European

- Afrikaans in South Africa
- English in Ghana, Gambia, Uganda, Zimbabwe, Nigeria, Cameroon, Kenya, South Africa, Liberia, Zambia, Malawi, Rwanda, Namibia, Seychelles, South Sudan, Sudan, Tanzania, Eswatini, Lesotho, and Mauritius.
- French in Benin, Burundi, Cameroon, Central African Republic, Chad, Comoros, Democratic Republic of Congo, Congo, Côte d'Ivoire, Djibouti, Equatorial Guinea, Gabon, Guinea, Madagascar, Rwanda, Senegal, Seychelles, and Togo.
- Portuguese in Angola, Mozambique, Guinea-Bissau, Cape Verde, São Tomé and Príncipe and Equatorial Guinea.
- Spanish in Equatorial Guinea

Niger-Congo

- Bambara in Mali
- Bobo in Mali
- Bozo in Mali
- Chewa in Malawi and Zimbabwe
- Comorian in the Comoros
- Dogon in Mali
- Fula in Mali
- Kassonke in Mali
- Kongo in Angola, Democratic Republic of the Congo, Gabon, and Republic of the Congo
- Kinyarwanda in Rwanda
- Kirundi in Burundi
- Maninke in Mali
- Minyanka in Mali
- Senufo in Mali
- Sesotho in Lesotho, South Africa and Zimbabwe
- Setswana in Botswana and South Africa
- Shona, Sindebele in Zimbabwe
- Sepedi in South Africa
- Soninke in Mali
- Ndebele in South Africa
- Swahili in Tanzania, Kenya, Rwanda and Uganda
- Swati in Eswatini (Swaziland) and South Africa
- Tsonga in South Africa
- Venda in South Africa
- Xhosa in South Africa
- Zulu in South Africa

Nilo-Saharan

- Songhay in Mali

Language	Family	Official status per country
Afar	Afroasiatic	Ethiopia, Djibouti (national)
Amharic	Afroasiatic	Ethiopia
Arabic	Afroasiatic	Algeria, Comoros, Chad, Djibouti, Egypt, Eritrea, Libya, Mauritania, Morocco, Somalia, Sudan
Berber	Afroasiatic	Algeria, Morocco
Hausa	Afroasiatic	Niger, Nigeria (national)
Oromo	Afroasiatic	Ethiopia
Somali	Afroasiatic	Somalia, Ethiopia, Djibouti (national)
Tigrinya	Afroasiatic	Ethiopia, Eritrea (national)
Malagasy	Austronesian	Madagascar
Seychelles Creole	French Creole	Seychelles
Afrikaans	Indo-European	South Africa
Sango	Ngbandi creole	Central African Republic
Chewa	Niger-Congo	Malawi, Zimbabwe
Comorian	Niger-Congo	Comoros
Kikongo	Niger-Congo	Angola, Democratic Republic of the Congo, Republic of the Congo
Kinyarwanda	Niger-Congo	Rwanda
Kirundi	Niger-Congo	Burundi
Ndebele	Niger-Congo	South Africa
Sepedi	Niger-Congo	South Africa
Sesotho	Niger-Congo	Lesotho, South Africa, Zimbabwe
Setswana	Niger-Congo	Botswana, South Africa
Shona	Niger-Congo	Zimbabwe
Sindebele	Niger-Congo	Zimbabwe
Swahili	Niger-Congo	Kenya, Rwanda, Tanzania, Uganda
Swati	Niger-Congo	Eswatini, South Africa
Tsonga	Niger-Congo	Mozambique, Zimbabwe, South Africa
Venda	Niger-Congo	South Africa, Zimbabwe
Xhosa	Niger-Congo	South Africa
Zulu	Niger-Congo	South Africa

=== Cross-border languages ===
The colonial borders established by European powers following the Berlin Conference in 1884–1885 divided a great many ethnic groups and African language speaking communities. This can cause divergence of a language on either side of a border (especially when the official languages are different), for example, in orthographic standards. Some notable cross-border languages include Berber (which stretches across much of North Africa and some parts of West Africa), Kikongo (that stretches across northern Angola, western and coastal Democratic Republic of the Congo, and western and coastal Republic of the Congo), Somali (stretches across most of the Horn of Africa), Swahili (spoken in the African Great Lakes region), Fula (in the Sahel and West Africa) and Luo (in Democratic Republic of the Congo, Ethiopia, Kenya, Tanzania, Uganda, South Sudan and Sudan).

Some prominent Africans such as former Malian president and former Chairman of the African Commission, Alpha Oumar Konaré, have referred to cross-border languages as a factor that can promote African unity.

=== Language change and planning ===
Language is not static in Africa any more than on other continents. In addition to the (likely modest) impact of borders, there are also cases of dialect levelling (such as in Igbo and probably many others), koinés (such as N'Ko and possibly Runyakitara) and emergence of new dialects (such as Sheng). In some countries, there are official efforts to develop standardized language versions.

There are also many less widely spoken languages that may be considered endangered languages.

=== Demographics ===
Of the 1 billion Africans (in 2009), about 17 percent speak an Arabic dialect. About 10 percent speak Swahili, the lingua franca of Southeast Africa; about 5 percent speak a Berber dialect; and about 5 percent speak Hausa, which serves as a lingua franca in much of the Sahel. Other large West African languages are Yoruba, Igbo, Akan and Fula. Major Horn of Africa languages are Somali, Amharic and Oromo. Lingala is important in Central Africa. Important South African languages are Sotho, Tswana, Pedi, Venda, Tsonga, Swazi, Southern Ndebele, Zulu and Xhosa.

English, French, and Portuguese are important languages in Africa due to colonialism. About 240 million, 167 million, and 35 million Africans, respectively, speak them as either native or secondary languages. Portuguese has become the national language of Angola and São Tomé and Príncipe, and Portuguese is the official language of Mozambique.

== Linguistic features ==
Some linguistic features are particularly common among languages spoken in Africa, whereas others are less common. Such shared traits probably are not due to a common origin of all African languages. Instead, some may be due to language contact (resulting in borrowing) and specific idioms and phrases may be due to a similar cultural background.

=== Phonological ===
Some widespread phonetic features include:

- certain types of consonants, such as implosives (/ɓa/), ejectives (/kʼa/), the labiodental flap and in southern Africa, clicks (/ǂa/, /ᵑǃa/). True implosives are rare outside Africa, and clicks and the flap almost unheard of.
- doubly articulated labial-velar stops like /k͡pa/ and /ɡ͡ba/ are found in places south of the Sahara.
- prenasalized consonants, like /mpa/ and /ŋɡa/, are widespread in Africa but not common outside it.
- sequences of stops and fricatives at the beginnings of words, such as /fsa/, /pta/ and /dt͡sk͡xʼa/.
- nasal stops which only occur with nasal vowels, such as [ba] vs. [mã] (but both [pa] and [pã]), especially in West Africa.
- vowels contrasting an advanced or retracted tongue, commonly called "tense" and "lax".
- simple tone systems which are used for grammatical purposes.

Sounds that are relatively uncommon in African languages include uvular consonants, diphthongs and front rounded vowels

Tonal languages are found throughout the world but are especially common in Africa - in fact, there are far more tonal than non-tonal languages in Africa. Both the Nilo-Saharan and the Khoi-San phyla are fully tonal. The large majority of the Niger–Congo languages are also tonal. Tonal languages are also found in the Omotic, Chadic and South & East Cushitic branches of Afroasiatic. The most common type of tonal system opposes two tone levels, High (H) and Low (L). Contour tones do occur, and can often be analysed as two or more tones in succession on a single syllable. Tone melodies play an important role, meaning that it is often possible to state significant generalizations by separating tone sequences ("melodies") from the segments that bear them. Tonal sandhi processes like tone spread, tone shift, downstep and downdrift are common in African languages.

=== Syntactic ===
Widespread syntactical structures include the common use of adjectival verbs and the expression of comparison by means of a verb 'to surpass'. The Niger–Congo languages have large numbers of genders (noun classes) which cause agreement in verbs and other words. Case, tense and other categories may be distinguished only by tone. Auxiliary verbs are also widespread among African languages; the fusing of subject markers and TAM/polarity auxiliaries into what are known as tense pronouns are more common in auxiliary verb constructions in African languages than in most other parts of the world.

=== Semantic ===
Quite often, only one term is used for both animal and meat; the word nama or nyama for animal/meat is particularly widespread in otherwise widely divergent African languages.

== Demographics ==
The following is a table displaying the number of speakers of prominent languages within Africa:

Language	Family	Native speakers within Africa (L1)	All speakers around the world (L1 + L2)	Official status per country
ǂKxʼaoǁʼae	Kxʼa	5,000 (2003)	-	Native to Namibia and Botswana
ǂʼAmkoe	Kxʼa	20–50 Western ǂʼAmkoe (2015) unknown number Eastern ǂʼAmkoe	-	Native to Botswana
Abon	Niger–Congo (Probable)	800 (1990)	-	Native to Cameroon
Abron	Niger–Congo	1,393,000 (2013)	-	Native to Ghana and Ivory Coast
Acheron	Niger–Congo (Probable)	20,000 (2006) 9,800 in home area (2006)	-	Native to Sudan
Adara	Niger–Congo (Probable)	300,000 (2011)	-	Native to Nigeria
Afar	Afroasiatic	2,500,000 (2019–2022)	-	Official in Ethiopia Recognised minority language in Djibouti and Eritrea, Native to Djibouti, Eritrea, and Ethiopia
Afrikaans	Indo-European	7,200,000 (2011)	17,300,000 (2011, 2016)	National language in Namibia, co-official in South Africa
Aghem	Niger–Congo (Probable)	27,000 (2000)	-	Native to Cameroon
Aiki	Nilo-Saharan (Probable)	19,000 Kibet (1983) 43,000 Runga (1993–1996)	-	Native to Chad and Central African Republic
Aja	Nilo-Saharan (Probable)	200 (1993)	-	Native to South Sudan and Central African Republic
Aka	Niger–Congo (Probable)	30,000 (1986–1996)	-	Native to Central African Republic and Republic of Congo
Akan	Niger–Congo	8,900,000 (2013)	-	None. Government sponsored language of Ghana
Ambo	Niger–Congo (Probable)	1,000 or fewer (undated)	-	Native to Nigeria
Amdang	Nilo-Saharan (Probable)	170,000 (2024)	-	Native to Chad and Sudan
Ambele	Niger–Congo (Probable)	5,000 (2005)	-	Native to Cameroon
Amharic	Afroasiatic	35,000,000 (2020)	60,000,000 (2019–2020)	Ethiopia
Amira	Niger–Congo (Probable)	5,100 (1984)	-	Native to Sudan
Anaang	Niger–Congo (Probable)	2,900,000 (2020)	-	Native to Nigeria
Áncá	Niger–Congo (Probable)	300 Áncá (2006)	-	Native to Cameroon
Asoa	Nilo-Saharan (Probable)	26,000 (2000)	-	Native to Democratic Republic of the Congo
Atsam	Niger–Congo (Probable)	30,000 (1982)	-	Native to Nigeria
Arabic	Afroasiatic	150,000,000 but with separate mutually unintelligible varieties	481,000,000 (2020–2024)	Algeria, Chad, Comoros, Djibouti, Egypt, Libya, Mauritania, Morocco, Sahrawi Arab Democratic Republic, Somalia, Sudan, Tanzania (Zanzibar), Tunisia
Aringa	Nilo-Saharan (Probable)	495,000 (2014)	-	Native to Uganda
Avokaya	Nilo-Saharan (Probable)	100,000 (1989–2017)	-	Native to South Sudan and Democratic Republic of the Congo
Awing	Niger–Congo (Probable)	19,000 (2001)	-	Native to Cameroon
Baba	Niger–Congo (Probable)	25,000 (2005)	-	Native to Cameroon
Babanki	Niger–Congo (Probable)	39,000 (2011)	-	Native to Cameroon
Baca	Niger–Congo (Probable)	4,500 (2007)	-	Native to Cameroon
Bacama	Afroasiatic	300,000 (2020)	-	Native to Nigeria
Bade	Afroasiatic	360,000 (2020)	-	Native to Nigeria
Baka	Nilo-Saharan (Probable)	60,000 (2017)	-	Native to South Sudan and Democratic Republic of the Congo
Barambu	Niger–Congo (Probable)	26,000 (1990)	-	Native to Democratic Republic of the Congo
Bariba	Niger–Congo (Probable)	1,100,000 (1995–2021)	-	Recognized in Benin Native to Benin, Burkina Faso, Niger, Nigeria, and Togo
Bala	Niger–Congo (Probable)	60,000 Lobala (2000) 21,000 Boko	-	Native to Democratic Republic of the Congo
Balo	Niger–Congo (Probable)	2,200 (2000)	-	Native to Cameroon
Bamali	Niger–Congo (Probable)	10,800 (2008)	-	Native to Cameroon
Bambara	Niger–Congo (Probable)	4,200,000 (2012)	-	Official in Mali
Bambassi	Afroasiatic	2,300 (2011)	-	Native to Ethiopia
Bambalang	Niger–Congo (Probable)	29,000 (2008)	-	Native to Cameroon
Bamukumbit	Niger–Congo (Probable)	12,000 (2008)	-	Native to Cameroon
Bamum	Niger–Congo (Probable)	420,000 (2005)	-	Native to Cameroon and Nigeria
Bamwe	Niger–Congo (Probable)	20,000 (1983)	-	Native to Democratic Republic of the Congo
Bangala	Niger–Congo (Probable)	A few	-	Native to Democratic Republic of the Congo and Republic of the Congo
Bangi	Niger–Congo (Probable)	120,000 (2000)	-	Native to Republic of Congo and Democratic Republic of the Congo
Bangolan	Niger–Congo (Probable)	14,000 (2011)	-	Native to Cameroon
Bassari	Niger–Congo (Probable)	31,000 (2017)	-	Native to Guinea and Senegal
Baṭḥari	Afroasiatic	16 (2016)	-	Native to Oman
Batu	Niger–Congo (Probable)	25,000	-	Native to Nigeria
Bebe	Niger–Congo (Probable)	3,600 (2008)	-	Native to Cameroon
Beba	Niger–Congo (Probable)	3,000 (2002)	-	Native to Cameroon
Beli	Nilo-Saharan (Probable)	65,000 (2009)	-	Native to South Sudan
Bemba	Niger–Congo (Probable)	4,100,000 (2000–2010)	-	Recognized minority in Zambia Native to Zambia, Democratic Republic of the Congo, and Tanzania
Bembe	Niger–Congo (Probable)	100,000 (2007)	-	Native to Republic of Congo
Bembe	Niger–Congo (Probable)	250,000 in DRC (1991)	-	Native to Democratic Republic of the Congo and Tanzania
Berber	Afroasiatic	16,000,000 (estimated) but with separate mutually unintelligible varieties	-	Morocco, Algeria
Berta	Nilo-Saharan (Probable)	380,000 (2006–2007)	-	Native to Sudan and Ethiopia
Besme	Niger–Congo (Probable)	1,200 (1993)	-	Native to Chad
Bhaca	Niger–Congo (Probable)	Unknown	-	Native to South Africa
Bhojpuri	Indo-European	65,300 (2011)	-	Native to Mauritius
Bina	Niger–Congo (Probable)	7,000 (2000)	-	Native to Nigeria
Binza	Niger–Congo (Probable)	10,000 (1986)	-	Native to Democratic Republic of the Congo
Birri	Nilo-Saharan (Probable)	200 (1996)	-	Native to Central African Republic
Biseni	Niger–Congo (Probable)	4,800 (1977)	-	Native to Nigeria
Bissa	Niger–Congo (Probable)	590,000 (1999–2003)	-	Native to Burkina Faso, Ghana, and Togo
Bitare	Niger–Congo (Probable)	52,000 (2000–2003)	-	Native to Cameroon and Nigeria
Bobo	Niger–Congo (Probable)	340,000 (1995–2021)	-	Native to Burkina Faso and Mali
Bole	Afroasiatic	250,000 (2023)	-	Native to Nigeria
Bole	Niger–Congo (Probable)	4,000 (2004)	-	Native to Republic of Congo
Bolon	Niger–Congo (Probable)	23,000 (1998)	-	Native to Burkina Faso
Bomboli–Bozaba	Niger–Congo (Probable)	8,000 (1983–1986)	-	Native to Democratic Republic of the Congo
Bomboma	Niger–Congo (Probable)	23,000 (1983)	-	Native to Democratic Republic of the Congo
Bomitaba	Niger–Congo (Probable)	9,800 (2000)	-	Native to Republic of Congo and Central African Republic
Bomu	Niger–Congo (Probable)	320,000-380,000 (1991–2022)	-	Native to Burkina Faso and Mali
Bongili	Niger–Congo (Probable)	12,000 (2018)	-	Native to Republic of Congo
Bongo	Nilo-Saharan (Probable)	21,000 (2017)	-	Native to South Sudan
Bonjo	Niger–Congo (Probable)	3,000	-	Native to Republic of Congo
Bono	Niger–Congo (Probable)	1,400,000 (2013)	-	Native to Ghana and Ivory Coast
Bono	Niger–Congo (Probable)	200,000 (2006)	-	Native to Nigeria
Boon	Niger–Congo (Probable)	60 (2000)	-	Native to Somalia
Boko	Niger–Congo (Probable)	150,000 (2012)	-	Native to Benin, Nigeria
Boze	Niger–Congo (Probable)	Unknown	-	Native to Nigeria
Bozo	Mande	230,000 (apart from Tieyaxo) in Mali (2003–2009)	-	Spoken in Mali
Bube	Niger–Congo (Probable)	51,000 (2011)	-	Recognized minority in Equatorial Guinea and Bioko Island Native to Equatorial Guinea, Gabon, Cameroon
Budza	Niger–Congo (Probable)	230,000 (1985)	-	Native to Democratic Republic of the Congo
Buli	Niger–Congo (Probable)	170,000 (2013)	-	Native to Ghana
Bukusu	Niger–Congo (Probable)	1,400,000 (2009)	-	Native to Kenya
Bulu	Niger–Congo (Probable)	860,000 (2007)	-	Native to Cameroon
Bum	Niger–Congo (Probable)	21,000 (2001)	-	Native to Cameroon
Buru–Angwe	Niger–Congo (Probable)	1,000 speakers of Buru; potentially substantially more of Angwe (uncited)	-	Native to Nigeria
Busa	Niger–Congo (Probable)	110,000 (2012)	-	Native to Benin, Nigeria
Bushong	Niger–Congo (Probable)	160,000 (2000)	-	Native to Democratic Republic of the Congo
Buu	Niger–Congo (Probable)	100–200 (2012)	-	Native to Cameroon
Buyu	Niger–Congo (Probable)	10,000 (2002)	-	Native to Democratic Republic of the Congo
Bwela	Niger–Congo (Probable)	8,400 (2002)	-	Native to Democratic Republic of the Congo
Caka	Niger–Congo (Probable)	5,000 (1983)	-	Native to Cameroon
Cape Verdean Creole	Portuguese Creole	871,000 (2017)	-	National language in Cape Verde
Cebaara	Niger–Congo (Probable)	860,000 (1993)	-	Native to Ivory Coast
Central Banda	Niger–Congo (Probable)	580,000 (1984–1996)	-	Native to Central African Republic, Democratic Republic of the Congo and South Sudan
Chewa	Niger–Congo (Probable)	7,000,000 (2007)	-	Malawi, Zimbabwe
Chopi	Niger–Congo (Probable)	1,100,000 (2017)	-	Native to Mozambique
Chung	Niger–Congo (Probable)	1,400 (2001)	-	Native to Cameroon
Comorian	Niger–Congo (Probable)	1,100,000 (2007–2011)	-	Comoros
Dagaare	Niger–Congo (Probable)	1,300,000 (1999–2021)	-	Native to Burkina Faso, Ghana, and Ivory Coast
Dagbani	Niger–Congo (Probable)	1,200,000 (2013)	-	Native to Ghana, Togo
Dangme	Niger–Congo (Probable)	1,020,000 (2013)	-	Ghana
Daza	Nilo-Saharan (Probable)	700,000 (2019–2021)	-	Native to Chad and Niger
Dciriku	Niger–Congo (Probable)	82,000 (2004–2018)	-	Native to Namibia, Botswana and Angola
Dendi	Nilo-Saharan (Probable)	440,000 (2000–2021)	-	Native to Benin, Niger, and Nigeria
Dengese	Niger–Congo (Probable)	8,600 (2000)	-	Native to Democratic Republic of the Congo
Defaka	Niger–Congo (Probable)	200 (2001)	-	Spoken in Nigeria
Dinka	Nilo-Saharan	4,238,400 (2007)	-	South Sudan
Djimini	Niger–Congo (Probable)	96,000 (1993)	-	Spoken in Ivory Coast
Doghose	Niger–Congo (Probable)	20,000 (1991)	-	Native to Burkina Faso
Dogoso	Niger–Congo (Probable)	9,000 (1999)	-	Native to Burkina Faso and Ivory Coast
Doko	Niger–Congo (Probable)	Unknown	-	Native to Democratic Republic of the Congo
Dongo	Nilo-Saharan (Probable)	Unknown	-	Native to South Sudan
Dyula	Niger–Congo (Probable)	2,600,000 (2012–2021)	-	Native to Burkina Faso, Mali, and Ivory Coast
Dzando	Niger–Congo (Probable)	6,000 (1983)	-	Native to Democratic Republic of the Congo
Dzodinka	Niger–Congo (Probable)	2,600 (2000)	-	Native to Cameroon and Nigeria
Ebira	Niger–Congo (Probable)	2,200,000 (2020)	-	Native to Nigeria
Ekoka ǃKung	Kxʼa	16,500 (2013)	-	Native to South Africa, Namibia, and Angola
Eman	Niger–Congo (Probable)	800 (1990)	-	Native to Cameroon
English	Indo-European	6,500,000 (estimated)	-	See List of countries and territories where English is an official language
Esimbi	Niger–Congo (Probable)	34,800 (2005)	-	Native to Cameroon
Eton	Niger–Congo (Probable)	1,500,000 (2020)	-	Native to Cameroon
Evant	Niger–Congo (Probable)	10,000 (1996)	-	Native to Cameroon and Nigeria
Ewondo	Niger–Congo (Probable)	580,000 (1982)	-	Native to Cameroon
Fang	Niger–Congo (Probable)	1,000,000 (2006–2013)	-	Recognized minority in Equatorial Guinea and Gabon Native to Equatorial Guinea, Gabon, Republic of the Congo, Cameroon, and São Tomé and Príncipe
Fang	Niger–Congo (Probable)	4,000 (2011)	-	Native to Cameroon
Fanji	Niger–Congo (Probable)	17,000 (2008)	-	Native to Cameroon
Farefare	Niger–Congo (Probable)	660,000 (1991–2013)	-	Native to Burkina Faso and Ghana
Feʼfeʼ	Niger–Congo (Probable)	140,000 (2005)	-	Native to Cameroon
Fio	Niger–Congo (Probable)	Unknown but extant (2011–2015)	-	Native to Cameroon
Fon	Niger–Congo	2,300,000 (2019–2021)	-	Benin
Fongoro	Nilo-Saharan (Probable)	a few elders (2007)	-	Native to Chad
French	Indo-European	1,200,000 (estimated)	396,000,000 (2026)	See List of territorial entities where French is an official language and African French
Fulani	Niger–Congo	40,000,000	67,000,000 (2014–2021)	Northern Benin, Burkina Faso, Cameroon, Gambia, Northern Ghana, Guinea, Guinea-Bissau, Mali, northeastern Nigeria, Southern Niger, and Senegal
Fungor	Niger–Congo (Probable)	2,700 (1984)	-	Native to Sudan
Fur	Nilo-Saharan (Probable)	790,000 (2004–2023)	-	Native to Chad and Sudan
Furu	Nilo-Saharan (Probable)	16,000 (1984–1996)	-	Native to Democratic Republic of the Congo
Fut	Niger–Congo (Probable)	100,000 (2009)	-	Native to Cameroon
Fwe	Niger–Congo (Probable)	15,000	-	Native to Namibia and Zambia
Gǀui	Khoe–Kwadi	1,500 (2013)	-	Native to Botswana
Ga	Niger–Congo (Probable)	745,000 (2016)	-	Ghana
German	Indo-European		-	National language of Namibia, special status in South Africa
Gendza	Niger–Congo (Probable)	43,000 (1986)	-	Native to Democratic Republic of the Congo
Gengele Creole	Niger–Congo (Probable)	Unknown	-	Native to Democratic Republic of the Congo
Geme	Niger–Congo (Probable)	550 (1996)	-	Native to Central African Republic
Ghomalaʼ	Niger–Congo (Probable)	350,000 (2005)	-	Native to Cameroon
Gikuyu	Niger–Congo (Probable)	8,100,000	-	Spoken in Kenya
Goundo	Niger–Congo (Probable)	30 (1998)	-	Native to Chad
Gourmanché	Niger–Congo (Probable)	1,500,000 (2012–2021)	-	Native to Benin, Burkina Faso, Ghana, Niger, Nigeria, and Togo
Gumuz	Nilo-Saharan (Probable)	160,000 in Ethiopia (2007) 88,000 in Sudan (2017)	-	Spoken in Ethiopia and Sudan
Gwari	Niger–Congo (Probable)	1,840,000 (2020)	-	Native to Nigeria
Gyong	Niger–Congo (Probable)	25,000 (2000)	-	Native to Nigeria
Hakaona	Niger–Congo (Probable)	Unknown	-	Native to Angola and Namibia
Hanga	Niger–Congo (Probable)	6,800 (2003)	-	Native to Ghana
Ḥarsusi	Afroasiatic	600 (2011)	-	Native to Oman
Hassaniya Arabic	Afroasiatic	5,200,000 (2014–2021)	-	Mali, Recognized in Morocco
Hausa	Afroasiatic	54,000,000 (2021–2023)	94,000,000 (2023–2024)	Recognized in Nigeria, Ghana, and Niger
Heiban	Niger–Congo (Probable)	4,000 (1984)	-	Native to Sudan
Hendo	Niger–Congo (Probable)	50,000 (1982)	-	Native to Democratic Republic of Congo
Herero	Niger–Congo (Probable)	250,000 (2015–2018)	-	Native to Namibia, Botswana and Angola
Hindi	Indo-European		-	Spoken in Mauritius
Hlubi	Niger–Congo (Probable)	Unknown	-	Native to South Africa
Hõne	Niger–Congo (Probable)	7,000 (1999)	-	Native to Nigeria
Hun-Saare	Niger–Congo (Probable)	73,000 (1985)	-	Native to Nigeria
Humburi Senni	Nilo-Saharan (Probable)	81,000 (1999–2021)	-	Spoken in Burkina Faso, and Mali
Hyam	Niger–Congo (Probable)	300,000 (2014)	-	Native to Nigeria
Ibibio	Niger–Congo (Probable)	6,300,000 (2020)	-	Native to Nigeria
Iceve-Maci	Niger–Congo (Probable)	12,000 (1990)	-	Native to Cameroon and Nigeria
Idun	Niger–Congo (Probable)	78,000 (2012)	-	Native to Nigeria
Igala	Niger–Congo (Probable)	1,600,000 (2020)	-	Native to Nigeria
Igbo	Niger–Congo (Probable)	31,000,000 (2020)	-	Native to Nigeria
Ik	Nilo-Saharan (Probable)	14,000 (2014)	-	Native to Uganda
Ila	Niger–Congo (Probable)	106,000 (2010)	-	Native to Zambia
Imraguen	Niger–Congo (Probable)	530 (2006)	-	Native to Mauritania
Ipulo	Niger–Congo (Probable)	2,500 (1990)	-	Native to Cameroon
Isu	Niger–Congo (Probable)	15,000 (1993)	-	Native to Cameroon
Iyive	Niger–Congo (Probable)	2,000 (1996)	-	Native to Cameroon and Nigeria
Izon	Niger–Congo (Probable)	2,400,000 (2020)	-	Spoken in Nigeria
Italian	Indo-European		-	Recognized in Eritrea and Somalia
Jagham	Niger–Congo (Probable)	120,000 (2000)	-	Native to Cameroon and Nigeria
Jahanka	Niger–Congo (Probable)	150,000 (2017–2022)	-	Native to Guinea
Jarawa	Niger–Congo (Probable)	250,000 (2006–2011)	-	Native to Nigeria
Jelkung	Afro-Asiatic	1,300 (2000)	-	Native to Chad
Jiba	Niger–Congo (Probable)	2,000 (1977)	-	Native to Nigeria
Jju	Niger–Congo (Probable)	600,000 (2020)	-	Native to Nigeria
Juǀʼhoan	Kxʼa	4,000 (2003)	-	Native to Namibia and Botswana
Juba Arabic	Arabic-based creole	250,000 (2020)	-	Native to South Sudan
Jukun Takum	Niger–Congo (Probable)	2,400 (2000)	-	Native to Cameroon and Nigeria
Jur Modo	Nilo-Saharan (Probable)	180,000 (2017)	-	Native to South Sudan
Kabalai	Afro-Asiatic	18,000 (1993)	-	Native to Chad
Kadugli	Nilo-Saharan (Probable)	75,000 (2004)	-	Native to Sudan
Kamara	Niger–Congo (Probable)	3,000 (2003)	-	Native to Burkina Faso and Ghana
Kanga	Nilo-Saharan (Probable)	17,000 (2022)	-	Native to Sudan
Kalabari	Niger–Congo (Probable)	258,000 (2006)	-	Native to Nigeria
Kalenjin	Nilo-Saharan (Probable)	6,600,000	-	Native to Kenya and Uganda
Kanembu	Nilo-Saharan (Probable)	880,000 (2019)	-	Native to Chad
Kantosi	Niger–Congo (Probable)	6,300 (2020)	-	Native to Burkina Faso and Ghana
Kanuri	Nilo-Saharan (Probable)	9,600,000 (1993–2021)	-	Native to Cameroon, Chad, Niger, and Nigeria
Kar	Niger–Congo (Probable)	40,000 (1995)	-	Native to Burkina Faso
Karanga	Nilo-Saharan (Probable)	10,000 (1999)	-	Native to Chad
Kasena	Niger–Congo (Probable)	250,000 (1998–2004)	-	Native to Burkina Faso and Ghana
Kassonke	Niger–Congo (Probable)	2,500,000 (2009–2022)	-	Recognized in Mali
Katla	Niger–Congo (Probable)	25,000 Julud (2009) Possibly 14,000 Katla (1984)	-	Native to Sudan
Keiga	Nilo-Saharan (Probable)	6,100 (1984)	-	Native to Sudan
Kemezung	Niger–Congo (Probable)	3,540 (2008)	-	Native to Cameroon
Kendeje	Nilo-Saharan (Probable)	1,900 (2000)	-	Native to Chad
Kele	Niger–Congo (Probable)	14,000 (2000–2007)	-	Native to Democratic Republic of Congo and Gabon
Kele-Foma	Niger–Congo (Probable)	160,000 (1980)	-	Native to Democratic Republic of Congo
Keliko	Nilo-Saharan (Probable)	42,500 (1989–2018)	-	Native to South Sudan and Democratic Republic of the Congo
Kelo	Nilo-Saharan (Probable)	200 (2009)	-	Native to Sudan
Kgalagadi	Niger–Congo (Probable)	65,400 (2015)	-	Native to Botswana
Khwe	Khoe–Kwadi	8,000 (2011)	-	Native to Namibia, Angola, Botswana, South Africa, and Zambia
Khoekhoe	Khoe–Kwadi	200,000 ± 10,000 (2011)	-	National language of Namibia
Ki	Niger–Congo (Probable)	26,000 (1982)	-	Native to Cameroon
Kim	Niger–Congo (Probable)	15,000 (1993)	-	Native to Chad
Kimbundu	Niger–Congo (Probable)	1,700,000 (2015)	-	Angola
Kinyarwanda	Niger–Congo (Probable)	15,000,000 (2014–2024)	-	Rwanda
Kirundi	Niger–Congo (Probable)	13,000,000 (2021)	-	Burundi
Kisi	Niger–Congo (Probable)	15,000 (2012)	-	Native to Tanzania
Kissi	Niger–Congo (Probable)	910,000 (2017–2020)	-	Native to Guinea, Liberia, and Sierra Leone
Kita Maninka	Niger–Congo (Probable)	449,000 (2001–2014)	-	Recognized in Mali
Kituba	Kongo-based creole	13,000,000 (2018–2022)	-	Democratic Republic of Congo, Republic of Congo
Koalib	Niger–Congo (Probable)	100,000 (2009)	-	Native to Sudan
Korandje	Nilo-Saharan (Probable)	3,000 (2010)	-	Native to Algeria
Koro Wachi	Niger–Congo (Probable)	150,000 (2006–2012)	-	Native to Nigeria
Kom	Niger–Congo (Probable)	210,000 (2005)	-	Native to Cameroon
Komo	Nilo-Saharan (Probable)	10,000 in Sudan (1979) 8,500 in Ethiopia (2007)	-	Native to Sudan, South Sudan, and Ethiopia
Kongo	Niger–Congo (Probable)	6,000,000 cited 1982–2021)	-	Angola, recognised national language of Republic of Congo and Democratic Republic of Congo
Konkomba	Niger–Congo (Probable)	920,000 (2012–2013)	-	Native to Ghana and Togo
Konni	Niger–Congo (Probable)	3,800 (2003)	-	Native to Ghana
Koshin	Niger–Congo (Probable)	3,000 (2011)	-	Native to Cameroon
Koyra Chiini	Nilo-Saharan (Probable)	200,000 (1999)	-	Native to Mali
Koyraboro Senni	Nilo-Saharan (Probable)	430,000 (2007)	-	Native to Mali
Kulango	Niger–Congo (Probable)	470,000 (2021)	-	Native to Ghana and Ivory Coast
Kunda	Niger–Congo (Probable)	160,000 (2000)	-	Native to Zimbabwe, Zambia, and Mozambique
Kusaal	Niger–Congo (Probable)	121,000 (2021 census)	-	Native to Burkina Faso, Ghana, and Togo
Kusu	Niger–Congo (Probable)	26,000 (1971)	-	Native to Democratic Republic of Congo
Kresh	Nilo-Saharan (Probable)	16,000 including Dongo (2013)	-	Native to South Sudan
Krio	English Creole	860,000 (2021)	-	Native to Sierra Leone
Krongo	Nilo-Saharan (Probable)	54,000 (2022)	-	Native to Sudan
Kuba	Niger–Congo (Probable)	30,000 (2000)	-	Native to Democratic Republic of Congo
Kuk	Niger–Congo (Probable)	3,000 (1993)	-	Native to Cameroon
Kukelle	Niger–Congo (Probable)	180,000 to 200,000 (2011)	-	Native to Nigeria
Kunama	Nilo-Saharan (Probable)	180,000 (2022)	-	Native to Eritrea, and Ethiopia
Kung	Niger–Congo (Probable)	12	-	Native to Cameroon
Kurama	Niger–Congo (Probable)	40,000 (2000)	-	Native to Nigeria
Kuranko	Niger–Congo (Probable)	670,000 (2017–2021)	-	Native to Guinea and Sierra Leone
Kuvale	Niger–Congo (Probable)	70,000 (2015)	-	Native to Angola
Kwaʼ	Niger–Congo (Probable)	1,000 (2000)	-	Native to Cameroon
Kwala	Niger–Congo (Probable)	45,000 (2000)	-	Native to Republic of the Congo
Kwama	Nilo-Saharan (Probable)	15,000 (2015)	-	Native to Ethiopia
Kwambi	Niger–Congo (Probable)	33,000 (2006)	-	Native to Namibia and Angola
Kwangali	Niger–Congo (Probable)	152,000 (2018)	-	Native to Namibia and Angola
Kwangwa	Niger–Congo (Probable)	2,400 (2010)	-	Native to Zambia
Kwanyama	Niger–Congo (Probable)	670,000 (1993–2006)	-	Native to Namibia and Angola
Kyenga	Niger–Congo (Probable)	12,000 (1995–2012)	-	Native to Benin and Nigeria
Kyoli	Niger–Congo (Probable)	7,000-8,000 (2020)	-	Native to Nigeria
Lala	Niger–Congo (Probable)	Unknown but extant (1999)	-	Native to South Africa
Lala-Bisa	Niger–Congo (Probable)	350,000 (2010)	-	Native to Zambia and Democratic Republic of the Congo
Lamba	Niger–Congo (Probable)	200,000 (2010)	-	Native to Zambia and Democratic Republic of the Congo
Laimbue	Niger–Congo (Probable)	5,000 (1994)	-	Native to Cameroon
Laro	Niger–Congo (Probable)	40,000 (2010)	-	Native to Sudan
Lega	Niger–Congo (Probable)	450,000 (1982–2000)	-	Native to Democratic Republic of Congo
Lele	Niger–Congo (Probable)	26,000 (1971)	-	Native to Democratic Republic of Congo
Lendu	Nilo-Saharan (Probable)	760,000 (1996)	-	Native to Democratic Republic of Congo
Lenje	Niger–Congo (Probable)	130,000 (2010)	-	Native to Zambia
Leti	Niger–Congo (Probable)	"small population" (2014)	-	Native to Cameroon
Lia-Ntomba	Niger–Congo (Probable)	200,000 (1980–2000)	-	Native to Democratic Republic of the Congo
Ligbi	Niger–Congo (Probable)	19,000 (1991–2003)	-	Native to Ghana
Limba	Niger–Congo (Probable)	2,200 (2001)	-	Native to Cameroon
Limba	Niger–Congo (Probable)	520,000 (1993–2019)	-	Native to Guinea and Sierra Leone
Limbum	Niger–Congo (Probable)	130,000 (2005)	-	Native to Cameroon
Lingala	Niger–Congo (Probable)	21,000,000 (2021)	-	National language of Democratic Republic of Congo, Republic of Congo
Lobedu	Niger–Congo (Probable)	1,000,000 (estimated)	-	Native to South Africa
Logol	Niger–Congo (Probable)	13,000 (2022)	-	Native to Sudan
Loki	Niger–Congo (Probable)	4,200	-	Native to Democratic Republic of the Congo
Londo	Niger–Congo (Probable)	3,000 (1983)	-	Native to Democratic Republic of the Congo
Lorhon	Niger–Congo (Probable)	8,000 (1991–1999)	-	Native to Burkina Faso and Ivory Coast
Losengo	Niger–Congo (Probable)	67,000 (1983–2002)	-	Native to Democratic Republic of the Congo
Lozi	Niger–Congo (Probable)	725,000 (1982–2010)	-	Native to Angola, Botswana, Namibia, South Africa, Zambia, and Zimbabwe
Luganda	Niger–Congo (Probable)	5,600,000 (2014)	-	Native to Uganda
Lugbara	Nilo-Saharan (Probable)	1,600,000 (2014)	-	Native to Uganda and Democratic Republic of Congo
Kuhane	Niger–Congo (Probable)	45,000	-	Native to Namibia, Botswana, and Zambia
Luhya	Niger–Congo (Probable)	6,800,000	-	Spoken in Kenya
Lumun	Niger–Congo (Probable)	15,000 (2014)	-	Native to Sudan
Luo	Nilo-Saharan (Probable)	4,200,000 (2009)	-	Kenya, Tanzania
Luyana	Niger–Congo (Probable)	3,380 (2010)	-	Native to Zambia
Maba	Nilo-Saharan (Probable)	570,000 (2019)	-	Native to Chad
Ma'di	Nilo-Saharan (Probable)	310,000 (1982–2002)	-	Native to Uganda and South Sudan
Mada	Niger–Congo (Probable)	100,000 (not counting Nunku) (1993)	-	Native to Nigeria
Malagasy	Austronesian	18,000,000	-	Madagascar
Marfa	Nilo-Saharan (Probable)	5,000 (1999)	-	Native in Chad
Marka	Niger–Congo (Probable)	190,000 (2009–2014)	-	Spoken in Burkina Faso
Mama	Niger–Congo (Probable)	2,000–3,000 (2001)	-	Native to Nigeria
Mampruli	Niger–Congo (Probable)	230,000 (2004)Dagbani	-	Native to Burkina Faso, Ghana, Ivory Coast, Mali, and Togo
Mandinka	Niger–Congo (Probable)	2,100,000 (2017–2022)	-	Recognized in Senegal
Mangbetu	Nilo-Saharan (Probable)	662,000 (1985)	-	Native to Democratic Republic of the Congo
Maninka	Niger–Congo (Probable)	4,600,000 (2012–2021)	-	Spoken in Nigeria
Mankon	Niger–Congo (Probable)	19,000 (2002)	-	Native to Cameroon
Manta	Niger–Congo (Probable)	5,300 (2001)	-	Native to Cameroon
Masaba	Niger–Congo (Probable)	2,700,000 (2002 & 2009)	-	Native to Kenya
Masalit	Nilo-Saharan (Probable)	410,000 (2019–2022)	-	Native to Chad and Sudan
Mashi	Niger–Congo (Probable)	22,000 (2000–2010)	-	Native to Zambia and Angola
Massa	Afro-Asiatic	340,000 (1982–2019)	-	Native to Cameroon and Chad
Mauritian Creole	French Creole	1,100,000 (2016)	-	Native to Mauritius
Mbamba Bay	Niger–Congo (Probable)	6,000 (2004)	-	Native to Tanzania
Mbandja	Ubangian	360,000 (2000)	-	Native to Democratic Republic of the Congo, Republic of Congo and Central African Republic
Mbati	Niger–Congo (Probable)	60,000 (2010)	-	Native to Central African Republic
Mbe	Niger–Congo (Probable)	65,000 (2011)	-	Native to Nigeria
Mbəʼ	Niger–Congo (Probable)	1,500 (2000)	-	Native to Cameroon
Mbessa	Niger–Congo (Probable)	25,000 (2020)	-	Native to Cameroon
Mbili-Mbui	Niger–Congo (Probable)	10,000 (1983)	-	Native to Cameroon
Mbowe	Niger–Congo (Probable)	460 (2010)	-	Native to Cameroon
Mbre	Niger–Congo (Probable)	50 (2017)	-	Native to Ivory Coast
Mbuʼ	Niger–Congo (Probable)	200 (2011)	-	Native to Cameroon
Mbuk	Niger–Congo (Probable)	600 (2020)	-	Native to Cameroon
Mbuko	Afro-Asiatic	15,000 (2008)	-	Native to Cameroon
Mbukushu	Niger–Congo (Probable)	95,000 (2020)	-	National language in Namibia and Native to Angola, Botswana, and Zambia
Mbwasa	Niger–Congo (Probable)	Unknown	-	Native to Cameroon
Medumba	Niger–Congo (Probable)	210,000 (1991)	-	Native to Cameroon
Mehri	Afro-Asiatic	230,000 (2020)	-	Native to Yemen, Oman and Saudi Arabia
Menchum	Niger–Congo (Probable)	3,000 (2000)	-	Native to Cameroon
Mendankwe-Nkwen	Niger–Congo (Probable)	28,000 (2005)	-	Native to Cameroon
Mengaka	Niger–Congo (Probable)	20,000 (1993)	-	Native to Cameroon
Menyam	Niger–Congo (Probable)	4,000 (1994)	-	Native to Cameroon
Mesaka	Niger–Congo (Probable)	14,000 (1982)	-	Native to Cameroon
Mfumte	Niger–Congo (Probable)	30,700 (1982–2000)	-	Native to Cameroon
Minyanka	Niger–Congo (Probable)	740,000 (2000)	-	Native to Mali
Missong	Niger–Congo (Probable)	400 (2012)	-	Native to Cameroon
Mmen	Niger–Congo (Probable)	35,000 (2001)	-	Native to Cameroon
Mmuock	Niger–Congo (Probable)	Unknown	-	Native to Cameroon
Moba	Niger–Congo (Probable)	440,000 (2004–2012)	-	Native to Burkina Faso, Ghana, and Togo
Moro	Niger–Congo (Probable)	79,000 (2022)	-	Native to Sudan
Morokodo	Nilo-Saharan (Probable)	3,400 (2011)	-	Native to South Sudan
Moru	Nilo-Saharan (Probable)	230,000 (2017)	-	Native to South Sudan
Mossi	Niger–Congo (Probable)	12,000,000 (2012–2022)	-	Recognised regional language in Burkina Faso
Mono	Niger–Congo (Probable)	65,000 (1984)	-	Native to Democratic Republic of the Congo
Mongo	Niger–Congo (Probable)	400,000 (1995)	-	Native to Democratic Republic of the Congo
Mooré	Niger–Congo (Probable)	12,000,000 (2012–2022)	-	Official in Burkina Faso Native to Burkina Faso, Benin, Ivory Coast, Ghana, Mali, Togo, Niger, and Senegal
Mundabli	Niger–Congo (Probable)	500 (2011)	-	Native to Cameroon
Mündü	Ubangian	26,000	-	Native to South Sudan and Democratic Republic of the Congo
Mundum	Niger–Congo (Probable)	Unknown	-	Native to Cameroon
Mungbam	Niger–Congo (Probable)	1,900–2,200 (2012)	-	Native to Cameroon
Munka	Niger–Congo (Probable)	31,000 (2008)	-	Native to Cameroon
Nabit	Niger–Congo (Probable)	30,000 (estimated) (2015)	-	Native to Burkina Faso, Ghana
Nafanan	Niger–Congo (Probable)	89,000 (2017)	-	Native to Ghana and the Ivory Coast
Nambya	Niger–Congo (Probable)	100,000 (2000–2004)	-	Native to Zimbabwe
Nancere	Afroasiatic	144,000 (2019)	-	Native to Chad
Nanerigé	Niger–Congo (Probable)	50,000 (1985)	-	Native to Burkina Faso
Naro	Khoe–Kwadi	9,000 (2011–2014)	-	Native to Botswana and Namibia
Nateni	Niger–Congo (Probable)	110,000 (2021)	-	Native to Benin
Naki	Niger–Congo (Probable)	3,000 (1993)	-	Native to Cameroon, Nigeria
Ntcham	Niger–Congo (Probable)	390,000 (2004–2013)	-	Native to Ghana and Togo
Ndaʼndaʼ	Niger–Congo (Probable)	10,000 (1990)	-	Native to Cameroon
Ndau	Niger–Congo (Probable)	2,400,000 (2000–2006)	-	Zimbabwe
Ndebele	Niger–Congo (Probable)	1,100,000 (2011)	-	Statutory national language in South Africa
Ndemli	Niger–Congo (Probable)	10,000 (1999)	-	Native to Cameroon
Nding	Niger–Congo (Probable)	400 (2020)	-	Native to Sudan
Ndombe	Niger–Congo (Probable)	22,300 (2000)	-	Native to Angola
Ndonga	Niger–Congo (Probable)	810,000 (2006)	-	Native to Namibia and Angola
Ndolo	Niger–Congo (Probable)	8,000 (1983)	-	Native to Democratic Republic of the Congo
Ndrulo	Nilo-Saharan (Probable)	110,000 (2014–2018)	-	Native language of Uganda and Democratic Republic of Congo
Ndzerem	Niger–Congo (Probable)	<1,000	-	Native to Cameroon
Ngaʼka	Niger–Congo (Probable)	50,000 (1982)	-	Native to Cameroon
Ngambwe	Niger–Congo (Probable)	Unknown	-	Native to Angola
Ngando	Niger–Congo (Probable)	5,000 (1996)	-	Native to Central African Republic
Ngangam	Niger–Congo (Probable)	200,000 (2012–2021)	-	Native to Benin and Togo
Ngbundu	Ubangian	16,000 (1984)	-	Native to Democratic Republic of the Congo
Ngelima	Niger–Congo (Probable)	14,000 (2000)	-	Native to Democratic Republic of the Congo
Ngiemboon	Niger–Congo (Probable)	250,000 (2007)	-	Native to Cameroon
Ngile	Niger–Congo (Probable)	39,000 (2024)	-	Native to Sudan
Ngiri	Niger–Congo (Probable)	80,000 (2000–2002)	-	Native to Democratic Republic of the Congo
Ngiti	Nilo-Saharan (Probable)	100,000 (1991)	-	Native to Democratic Republic of the Congo
Ngondi	Niger–Congo (Probable)	3,000 (2004)	-	Native to Republic of Congo
Ngomba	Niger–Congo (Probable)	63,000 (1999)	-	Native to Cameroon
Ngombale	Niger–Congo (Probable)	53,500 (2005)	-	Native to Cameroon
Ngombe	Niger–Congo (Probable)	150,000 (1971)	-	Native to Democratic Republic of the Congo
Ngwe	Niger–Congo (Probable)	73,000 (2001)	-	Native to Cameroon
Nigerian Pidgin	Niger–Congo (Probable)	4,700,000	-	Native to Nigeria
Ninzo	Niger–Congo (Probable)	35,000 (1973)	-	Native to Nigeria
Nkoroo	Niger–Congo (Probable)	4,500 (1989)	-	Native to Nigeria
Nkumbi	Niger–Congo (Probable)	150,000 (1996)	-	Native to Angola
Nkutu	Niger–Congo (Probable)	40,000 (1972)	-	Native to Democratic Republic of the Congo
Nsei	Niger–Congo (Probable)	25,000 (2008)	-	Native to Cameroon
Nsenga	Niger–Congo (Probable)	600,000 in Zambia and Mozambique (2006 – 2010) 16,000 in Zimbabwe (1969)	-	Native to Zambia, Mozambique, and Zimbabwe
Nso	Niger–Congo (Probable)	240,000 (2005)	-	Native to Cameroon
Noni	Niger–Congo (Probable)	50,000 (2005–2008)	-	Native to Cameroon
Noon	Niger–Congo (Probable)	33,000 (2007)	-	Official in Senegal
Northern Ndebele	Niger–Congo (Probable)	2,600,000 (2023)	-	Official in Zimbabwe
Northern Sotho	Niger–Congo (Probable)	4,700,000 (2011)	-	Official in South Africa
Nubi	Arabic-based creole	50,000 (2014–2019)	-	Native to Uganda, Kenya
Nuer	Nilo-Saharan	1,700,000 (2007–2017)	-	Native to South Sudan and Ethiopia
Numana	Niger–Congo (Probable)	50,000 (2008)	-	Native to Nigeria
Nupe	Niger–Congo (Probable)	1,800,000 (2020)	-	Native to Nigeria
Nyaneka	Niger–Congo (Probable)	300,000 to 1.2 million (before 1996)	-	Native to Angola
Nyanga	Niger–Congo (Probable)	150,000 (1994)	-	Native to Democratic Republic of the Congo
Nyankpa	Niger–Congo (Probable)	70,000 (2012)	-	Native to Nigeria
Nyarafolo	Niger–Congo (Probable)	60,000 (2009)	-	Native to Ivory Coast
Nyungwe	Niger–Congo (Probable)	490,000 (2017)	-	Native to Mozambique
Nzakara	Niger–Congo (Probable)	50,000 (1996)	-	Native to Central African Republic, and Democratic Republic of the Congo
Okodia	Niger–Congo (Probable)	3,600 (1977)	-	Native to Nigeria
Oku	Niger–Congo (Probable)	87,000 (2005)	-	Native to Cameroon
Ombo	Niger–Congo (Probable)	8,400 (2002)	-	Native to Democratic Republic of the Congo
Omi	Nilo-Saharan (Probable)	91,000 (2005)	-	Native to Democratic Republic of the Congo
Osatu	Niger–Congo (Probable)	400 (2002)	-	Native to Cameroon
Oluʼbo	Nilo-Saharan (Probable)	33,000 (2017)	-	Native to South Sudan
Opuo	Nilo-Saharan (Probable)	20,000 (2014–2019)	-	Native to Ethiopia and South Sudan
Oromo	Afroasiatic	37,071,900 (2020)	-	Official in Ethiopia Recognized minority in Kenya Native to Ethiopia, Kenya, and Somalia
Oruma	Niger–Congo (Probable)	5,000 (1995)	-	Native to Nigeria
Otank	Niger–Congo (Probable)	15,000 (2006)	-	Native to Cameroon and Nigeria
Otoro	Niger–Congo (Probable)	17,000 (2023)	-	Native to Sudan
Ovambo	Niger–Congo (Probable)	1,441,000 (1990)	-	Native to Angola and Namibia
Palaka	Niger–Congo (Probable)	8,000 (1995)	-	Native to Ivory Coast
Paleni	Niger–Congo (Probable)	260 (2012)	-	Native to Burkina Faso
Pambia	Niger–Congo (Probable)	21,000 (1982)	-	Native to Democratic Republic of the Congo
Pande	Niger–Congo (Probable)	8,870 (2010)	-	Native to Central African Republic
Phuthi	Niger–Congo (Probable)	20,000 (1999)	-	Native to Lesotho and South Africa
Pichinglis	English Creole	6,000 (2011)	-	Native to Bioko and Equatorial Guinea
Pinyin	Niger–Congo (Probable)	25,000 (2001)	-	Native to Cameroon
Piti	Niger–Congo (Probable)	8,100 (2013)	-	Native to Niger
Portuguese	Indo-European	17,000,000	-	Angola, Cape Verde, Guinea-Bissau, Equatorial Guinea, Mozambique, São Tomé and Príncipe
Pretoria Sotho	Sotho-Tswana language creole	Unknown	-	Native to South Africa
Rigwe	Niger–Congo (Probable)	40,000 (1985)	-	Native to Niger
Ronga	Niger–Congo (Probable)	720,000 (2006)	-	Native to Mozambique and South Africa
Saari	Niger–Congo (Probable)	7,600 (2008)	-	Native to Cameroon
Saba	Afroasiatic	1,300 (2000)	-	Native to Chad
Saho	Niger–Congo (Probable)	180,000 (2007–2022)	-	Native to Eritrea and Ethiopia
Samo	Niger–Congo (Probable)	230,000 (1995–1999)	-	Native to Burkina Faso and Mali
Samwe	Niger–Congo (Probable)	4,500 (1993)	-	Native to Burkina Faso
Sakata	Niger–Congo (Probable)	75,000 (1982)	-	Native to Democratic Republic of the Congo
Saya	Niger–Congo (Probable)	300,000 (2013)	-	Native to Niger
Sekele	Kxʼa	20,000 (2013–2019)	-	Native to Namibia, Angola
Sena	Niger–Congo (Probable)	2,869,000 (2017–2020)	-	Official in Zimbabwe Recognized in Malawi Native to Malawi, Mozambique, and Zimbabwe
Senara	Niger–Congo (Probable)	210,000 (1995–2010)	-	Native to Burkina Faso and Mali
Sengele	Niger–Congo (Probable)	17,000 (2002)	-	Native to Democratic Republic of the Congo
Sepedi	Niger–Congo (Probable)	4,700,000 (2011)	-	Official in South Africa
Sesotho	Niger–Congo (Probable)	5,600,000 (2001–2011)	-	Official in Lesotho, South Africa and Zimbabwe
Setlôkwa	Niger–Congo (Probable)	Unknown (Possibly ~670,000)	-	Native to Lesotho and South Africa
Seychellois Creole	French Creole	73,000 (1998)	-	Official in Seychelles
Shabo	Language isolate or possible Nilo-Saharan	400 (2000)	-	Native to Ethiopia
Shanjo	Niger–Congo (Probable)	4,400 (2010)	-	Native to Zambia
Shi	Niger–Congo (Probable)	660,000 (1991)	-	Native to Democratic Republic of the Congo
Shona	Niger–Congo (Probable)	8,400,000 (2012–2017)	14,000,000 (2010–2023)	Official in Zimbabwe Recognized minority in Mozambique
Shwai	Niger–Congo (Probable)	3,500 (1989)	-	Native to Sudan
Sighu	Niger–Congo (Probable)	1,000 (1990)	-	Native to Gabon
Simaa	Niger–Congo (Probable)	17,000 (2010)	-	Native to Zambia
Sinyar	Nilo-Saharan (Probable)	33,000 (2023)	-	Native to Chad
Siwu	Nilo-Saharan (Probable)	27,000 (2003)	-	Native to Ghana
Somali	Afroasiatic	21,937,940	24,000,000 (2019–2024)	Official in Somalia, Djibouti, Ethiopia, and Kenya Recognized minority in Kenya
Soninke	Niger–Congo (Probable)	2,300,000 (2017–2021)	-	Official in Mauritania, Mali, Senegal and The Gambia Native to Burkina Faso, Gambia, Ghana, Guinea-Bissau, Guinea, Ivory Coast, Mali, Mauritania, Senegal
Soli	Niger–Congo (Probable)	34,000 (2010)	-	Native to Zambia
Sotho	Niger–Congo (Probable)	5,600,000 (2001–2011)	-	Native to Lesotho, South Africa, and Zimbabwe
South Banda	Ubangian	200,000 (1996)	-	Native to Central African Republic and Democratic Republic of the Congo
Southeast Ijo	Niger–Congo (Probable)	72,000 (1977)	-	Native to Nigeria
Southern Birifor	Niger–Congo (Probable)	190,000 (2017)	-	Native to Ghana and Ivory Coast
Suba	Niger–Congo (Probable)	140,000 (2009)	-	Native to Kenya
Suba-Simbiti	Niger–Congo (Probable)	110,000 (2011)	-	Native to Tanzania
Sucite	Niger–Congo (Probable)	38,000 (1999–2007)	-	Native to Burkina Faso
Suku	Niger–Congo (Probable)	50,000 (1980)	-	Native to Democratic Republic of the Congo
Sukur	Afroasiatic	15,000 (1992)	-	Native to Nigeria
Supyire	Niger–Congo (Probable)	460,000 (1996–2007)	-	Native to Mali
Sumayela Ndebele	Niger–Congo (Probable)	Unknown but extant	-	Native to South Africa
Susu	Niger–Congo (Probable)	2,400,000 (2017–2019)	-	Native to Guinea, Sierra Leone, and Guinea Bissau
Suwu	Niger–Congo (Probable)	"few" (2007)	-	Native to Cameroon
Spanish	Indo-European	1,100,000 (2018)		Equatorial Guinea, Spain (Ceuta, Melilla, Canary Islands), still marginally spoken in Sahrawi Arab Democratic Republic, recognized in Morocco
Songhoyboro Ciine	Nilo-Saharan (Probable)	946,000 (2014)	-	Native to Niger
Southern Ndebele	Niger–Congo	1,100,000 (2011)	-	Official in South Africa
Surbakhal	Nilo-Saharan (Probable)	7,900 (2000)	-	Native to Chad
Syer-Tenyer	Niger–Congo (Probable)	30,000 (1991)	-	Native to Burkina Faso
Swahili	Niger–Congo (Probable)	5,300,000 (2019–2023)	97,300,000 (2019–2023)	Official in Tanzania, Kenya, Uganda, Rwanda, Democratic Republic of the Congo
Swazi	Niger–Congo (Probable)	2,300,000 (2013–2019)	-	Official in South Africa, Swaziland
Taa	Tuu	2,500 (2011)	-	Native to Botswana and Namibia
Tadaksahak	Nilo-Saharan (Probable)	170,000 (2022)	-	Native to Mali and Niger
Tagdal	Nilo-Saharan (Probable)	65,000 (2021)	-	Native to Niger
Tagoi	Niger–Congo (Probable)	29,000 (2022)	-	Native to Sudan
Tagwana	Niger–Congo (Probable)	140,000 (1993)	-	Native to Ivory Coast
Talodi	Niger–Congo (Probable)	1,500 (1989)	-	Native to Sudan
Talni	Niger–Congo (Probable)	100,000 (estimated) (2015)	-	Native to Burkina Faso and Ghana
Tamil	Dravidian		-	Native to Mauritius
Tasawaq	Nilo-Saharan (Probable)	21,000 (2021)	-	Native to Niger
Teda	Nilo-Saharan (Probable)	130,000 (2020–2024)	-	Native to Chad, Libya, and Niger
Tegali	Niger–Congo (Probable)	110,000 (2022)	-	Native to Sudan
Tegem	Niger–Congo (Probable)	5,100 (1984)	-	Native to Sudan
Telugu	Dravidian		-	Native to Mauritius
Tembo	Niger–Congo (Probable)	150,000 (1994)	-	Native to Democratic Republic of the Congo
Tetela	Niger–Congo (Probable)	760,000 (1991)	-	Native to Democratic Republic of the Congo
Tigrinya	Afroasiatic	9,700,000 (2022)	-	Official in Eritrea and Ethiopia
Tikar	Niger–Congo (Probable)	110,000 (2005)	-	Native to Cameroon
Tiro	Niger–Congo (Probable)	34,000 (2022)	-	Native to Sudan
Tima	Niger–Congo (Probable)	3,300 (2000)	-	Native to Sudan
Tiv	Niger–Congo (Probable)	5,200,000 (2024)	-	Native to Nigeria
Tocho	Niger–Congo (Probable)	2,700 (2013)	-	Native to Sudan
Tondi Songway Kiini	Nilo-Saharan (Probable)	3,000 (1998)	-	Native to Mali
Tonga	Niger–Congo (Probable)	1,500,000 (2001–2010)	-	Official in Zimbabwe Recognized minority in Zambia
Tonga	Niger–Congo (Probable)	330,000 (2017)	-	Native to Mozambique
Tonga	Niger–Congo (Probable)	165,000 (2018)	-	Recognized minority language in Malawi
Totela	Niger–Congo (Probable)	1,220 (2010)	-	Native to Namibia and Zambia
Tsamai	Afroasiatic	18,000 (2007)	-	Native to Ethiopia
Tsotsitaal and Camtho, aka Iscamtho	Niger–Congo (Probable)	500,000 (estimated)	-	Native to South Africa
Tshiluba	Niger–Congo (Probable)	6,300,000 (1991)	-	National language of Democratic Republic of the Congo
Tsonga or Xitsonga	Niger–Congo (Probable)	3,700,000 (2006–2011)	-	Official in South Africa and Zimbabwe Recognized minority in Mozambique Native to Eswatini, Mozambique, South Africa, and Zimbabwe
Tshivenda	Niger–Congo (Probable)	1,300,000 (2011)	-	Official in South Africa and Zimbabwe
Tswa	Niger–Congo (Probable)	1,200,000 (2006)	-	Native to Mozambique
Tswana	Niger–Congo (Probable)	5,800,000 (2015)	-	Official in Botswana, South Africa, Zimbabwe Recognized minority in Namibia Native to Botswana and South Africa
Tulishi	Nilo-Saharan	2,500 (2007)	-	Native to Sudan
Tumbuka	Niger–Congo (Probable)	7,100,000 (2024)	-	Recognized minority language in Malawi, Tanzania, Zambia
Tumtum	Nilo-Saharan (Probable)	17,000 (2022)	-	Native to Sudan
Twi	Niger–Congo (Probable)	630,000	-	Regional language in Ghana
Tyap	Niger–Congo (Probable)	875,000 (2020)	-	Native to Nigeria
Uduk	Nilo-Saharan (Probable)	22,000 (presumably after 2005)	-	Native to Sudan and South Sudan
Umbundu	Niger–Congo (Probable)	7,000,000 (2018)	-	Official in Angola
Venda	Niger–Congo (Probable)	1,300,000 (2011)	-	Official in South Africa, Zimbabwe Native to South Africa, Mozambique, and Zimbabwe
Vengo	Niger–Congo (Probable)	27,000 (2008)	-	Native to Cameroon
Viemo	Niger–Congo (Probable)	8,000 (1995)	-	Native to Burkina Faso
Viti	Niger–Congo (Probable)	Unknown (one village)	-	Native to Nigeria
Vori	Niger–Congo (Probable)	3,000 (2016)	-	Native to Nigeria
Voro	Niger–Congo (Probable)	Unknown	-	Native to Nigeria
Wannu	Niger–Congo (Probable)	a few thousand (1998)	-	Native to Nigeria
Wali	Niger–Congo (Probable)	85,000 (2013)	-	Native to Ghana
Wali	Nilo-Saharan (Probable)	9,000 (2007)	-	Native to Sudan
Wapan	Niger–Congo (Probable)	100,000 (1994)	-	Native to Nigeria
Weh	Niger–Congo (Probable)	8,000 (1993)	-	Native to Cameroon
Werni	Niger–Congo (Probable)	1,100 (1956)	-	Native to Sudan
West Banda	Ubangian	7,500 (1982–1996)	-	Native to Central African Republic and South Sudan
Wolof	Niger–Congo (Probable)	7,100,000 (2020–2021)	18,000,000 (2022–2023)	Lingua franca in Senegal
Wongo	Niger–Congo (Probable)	13,000 (2000)	-	Native to Democratic Republic of the Congo
Wushi	Niger–Congo (Probable)	27,000 (2008)	-	Native to Cameroon and possibly Nigeria
Xhosa	Niger–Congo (Probable)	7,600,000 (2013)	11,000,000 (2002)	Official in South Africa, Zimbabwe Recognized minority in Botswana Native to South Africa and Lesotho
Yamba	Niger–Congo (Probable)	80,000 (2000)	-	Native to Cameroon and Nigeria
Yangere	Ubangian	27,000 (1996)	-	Native to Central African Republic
Yalunka	Niger–Congo (Probable)	181,000 (2002–2017)	-	Native to Guinea
Yela-Kela	Niger–Congo (Probable)	213,000 Kela (1972–1977)	-	Native to Democratic Republic of the Congo
Yemba	Niger–Congo (Probable)	500,000 estimated (2023)	-	Native to Cameroon
Yeyi	Niger–Congo (Probable)	55,000 (2001)	-	Native to Namibia and Botswana
Yobe	Niger–Congo (Probable)	22,000 (1991–2012)	-	Native to Benin and Togo
Yoruba	Niger–Congo (Probable)	45,000,000 (2021)	50,000,000	Nigeria, Benin, Togo
Yulu	Nilo-Saharan (Probable)	13,000 (1987–2011)	-	Native to Central African Republic, Democratic Republic of Congo, South Sudan, and Sudan
Zaghawa	Nilo-Saharan (Probable)	450,000 (2019–2022)	-	Native to Chad and Sudan
Zande	Niger–Congo (Probable)	1,800,000 (1996–2017)	-	Native to Democratic Republic of the Congo, Central African Republic, and South Sudan
Zarma	Nilo-Saharan (Probable)	6,000,000 (2021)	-	Native to Niger, Mali, Burkina Faso, and Nigeria
Zemba	Niger–Congo (Probable)	25,000 (2011–2016)	-	Native to Angola and Namibia
Zhire	Niger–Congo (Probable)	11,000 to 15,000 (2021)	-	Native to Nigeria
Zhoa	Niger–Congo (Probable)	2,000 (1995)	-	Native to Cameroon
Zulu	Niger–Congo (Probable)	12,000,000 (2013–2017)	28,000,000	South Africa

=== By region ===
Below is a list of the major languages of Africa by region, family and total number of primary language speakers in millions.

North Africa: Afroasiatic; Semitic; Arabic: 200; Berber: 30–40; Kabyle; Atlas; Tuareg; Zenaga; Nilo-Saharan; Nubian: 5+; Fur: 5+; Zaghawa; Masalit; Niger–Congo; Kordofanian languages; Nuba	Central Africa: Niger–Congo, Bantu; Lingala; Kinyarwanda:12; Kongo:5+; Tshiluba; Kirundi	Eastern Africa: Niger–Congo, Bantu: Swahili: 5–10; Gikuyu: 8+; Ganda:6; Luhya: 6+; Austronesian; Malagasy: 20+; Niger–Congo, Ubangian; Gbaya:2; Banda:1–2; Zande; Nilo-Saharan; Kanuri:10; Luo:5+; Sara:3–4; Kalenjin:6+; Dinka; Nuer; Shilluk; Maasai:1–2; Afroasiatic; Semitic; Amharic: 20+; Tigrinya: 5; Cushitic; Somali: 10–15; Oromo: 30–35; Nilo-Saharan: 1; Gumuz; Anuak; Kunama; Nara; Niger–Congo: 1; Zigula	Southern Africa: Niger–Congo, Bantu; Zulu: 10; Xhosa: 8; Chokwe; Shona: 7; Sotho: 5; Tsonga: 12; Tswana: 4; Umbundu: 4; Sepedi: 4; Chichewa: 8; Makua: 8; Indo-European; Germanic; Afrikaans: 7; English: 5; Romance; Portuguese: 14	West Africa: Niger–Congo; Benue–Congo; Ibibio (Nigeria): 7; Volta–Niger; Igbo (Nigeria): 30–35; Yoruba: 40; Kwa: Akan (Ghana, Côte d'Ivoire): 11; Gur; More: 5; Senegambian; Fula (West Africa): 40; Wolof: 8; Afroasiatic; Chadic; Hausa: 50; Nilo-Saharan; Saharan; Kanuri: 10; Songhai:5; Zarma:5

== See also ==
=== General ===
- Writing systems of Africa
- Journal of West African Languages
- List of extinct languages of Africa
- Language endangerment and extinction in Africa

=== Works ===
- Polyglotta Africana
- The Languages of Africa

=== Classifiers ===
- Karl Lepsius
- Lionel Bender
- Wilhelm Bleek
- Christopher Ehret
- Carl Meinhof
- Diedrich Westermann
- Joseph Greenberg

=== Colonial and migratory influences ===
- Arabization
- Asian Africans
- Dutch Language Union
- French West Africa
- German colonization of Africa
- Islamization of Egypt
- Italian East Africa — including Italian Ethiopia
- Italian North Africa
- Latin Africa
- North African Arabs
- Maghrebi Arabic — via Muslim conquest of the Maghreb
- Portuguese language in Africa — predominant in Portuguese-speaking African countries
- Spanish Guinea — presently Equatorial Guinea
- Spanish West Africa
- Spanish North Africa
- West African Pidgin English
- White Africans of European ancestry

== Notes ==
By ISO 639-3 code
Enter an ISO code to find the corresponding language article.
