= KFL =

KFL or kfl may refer to:

- Former Kerala Football League, India
- kfl, the ISO 639-3 code for Kung language, Cameroon
- Kelly Fuels Ltd, fuels merchant in Northern Ireland
- Kenya Federation of Labour a defunct trade union form Kenya
