= Mbessa language =

Ring language of Cameroon

Mbessa
- Native to: Cameroon
- Region: North-West Province
- Native speakers: 25,000 (2020)
- Language family: Niger–Congo?: Atlantic–Congo; Benue–Congo; Southern Bantoid; Grassfields; Ring; Center; Mbessa

Language codes
- ISO 639-3: emz
- Glottolog: mbes1239

Mbessa (Mbesa) is a Ring language spoken in Cameroon, neighboring Kom, Oku language, Noni language. Mbessa is the language of the people of Mbessa Kingdom (Fondom) in Boyo Division in the Anglophone North-West Region of Cameroon.
