= Ngie =

Ngie may be,

- Ngie language
- Kwane a Ngie
