= Weh =

Weh or WEH may refer to:

== People ==
- Allen Weh, American politician

== Places ==
- Weh Island, Indonesia
- Weihai Dashuibo Airport, China (IATA code)
- West Ham station, London, England (station code)
- Western Express Highway, Mumbai, India
  - Western Express Highway metro station

== Other uses ==
- Weh language, spoken in Cameroon
- Wireless energy harvesting
