= Ring languages =

Languages of Cameroon and Nigeria

Ring
- Ring Road
- Geographic distribution: Cameroon, Nigeria
- Linguistic classification: Niger–Congo?: Atlantic–Congo; Benue–Congo; Southern Bantoid; Grassfields; Narrow; Ring

Language codes
- Glottolog: ring1243

The Ring or Ring Road languages, spoken in the Western Grassfields of Cameroon, form a branch of the Narrow Grassfields languages. The best-known Ring language is Kom.

The family is named after the old Ring Road of central Cameroon.

== Languages ==
- Centre: Babanki, Mmen, Kom, Mbessa, Bum, Kung, Kuk, Oku
- East: Nso (Lamnso')
- South: Vengo, Wushi, Bamunka, Kenswei Nsei
- West: Aghem, Isu, Laimbue, Weh, Zhoa

== See also ==
- List of Proto-Ring reconstructions (Wiktionary)
