= Zhoa language =

Grassfields Bantu language of Cameroon

Zhoa
- Native to: Cameroon
- Native speakers: (2,000 cited 1995)
- Language family: Niger–Congo?: Atlantic–Congo; Benue–Congo; Southern Bantoid; Grassfields; Ring; West; Zhoa

Language codes
- ISO 639-3: zhw
- Glottolog: zhoa1238

Zhoa is a Grassfields Bantu language of Cameroon.
