= Bum language =

Bantu language of Cameroon

Bum
- Native to: Cameroon
- Native speakers: 21,000 (2001)
- Language family: Niger–Congo?: Atlantic–Congo; Benue–Congo; Southern Bantoid; Grassfields; Ring; Center; Bum

Language codes
- ISO 639-3: bmv
- Glottolog: bumm1238

Bum is a Grassfields Bantu language of Cameroon.
