= Nsei language =

Grassfields Bantu language of Cameroon

Nsei
- Kenswei Nsei
- Native to: Cameroon
- Native speakers: 25,000 (2008)
- Language family: Niger–Congo?: Atlantic–Congo; Benue–Congo; Southern Bantoid; Grassfields; Ring; South; Nsei

Language codes
- ISO 639-3: ndb
- Glottolog: kens1251

Kenswei Nsei (Kensense), also Nsei or Mesing (Bamessing), is a Grassfields Bantu language of Cameroon.

== Phonology ==
=== Consonants ===
Consonants
		Labial		Alveolar		Post-alveolar		Velar		Glottal
		-voice	+voice	-voice	+voice	-voice	+voice	-voice	+voice	-voice
Nasal	Plain		m		n		ɲ		ŋ	
Nasal	Labialized						ɲʷ		ŋʷ	
Plosive/ Affricate	Plain		b	t	d	t͡ʃ	d͡ʒ	k	g	ʔ
Plosive/ Affricate	Pre-nasalized		ᵐb	ⁿt	ⁿd	ⁿt͡ʃ	ⁿd͡ʒ	ᵑk	ᵑg	
Plosive/ Affricate	Lablalized		bʷ	tʷ	dʷ	t͡ʃʷ	d͡ʒʷ	kʷ	gʷ	
Plosive/ Affricate	Pre-nasalized and labialized		ᵐbʷ	ⁿtʷ	ⁿdʷ	ⁿt͡ʃʷ	ⁿd͡ʒʷ	ᵑkʷ	ᵑgʷ	
Fricative	Plain	f	v	s	z				ɣ (Note: /ɣ/ becomes [ɰ] before back vowels.)	h
Fricative	Pre-nasalized	ᶬf		ⁿs						
Fricative	Labialized			sʷ	zʷ					
Fricative	Pre-nasalized and labialized			ⁿsʷ						
Approximant	Plain				l		j (Note: [j] is in free variation with [ʒ].)		w	
Approximant	Labialized				lʷ		jʷ			

=== Vowels ===
Vowels
	Front	Central	Back
Close	i	ɨ̝ (Note: /ɨ̝/ becomes [ɨ] before /ŋ/.)	u
Close-mid	e (Note: /e/ becomes [ɪ] in short open syllables.)	ə (Note: /ə/ becomes [ɵ] before a pause when friction is present.)	o (Note: /o/ becomes [ʊ] before a pause when friction is present.)
Open-mid	ɛ	ə	ɔ
Open	æ	ä (Note: /ä/ becomes [ɒ] before [w].)	

=== Tone ===
Nsei has both lexical and grammatical tone. There are at least two level tones (high, low, and possibly mid) and two contour tones (falling and rising).
