= Wutana language =

Supposed language

A hypothetical Wutana language was mentioned in early editions of the Ethnologue as spoken in Nigeria, but has now been removed. The inclusion of Wutana in the Ethnologue was based on two sentences in a 1922 article by Olive Temple:

There are 1,075 Wutana in Bauchi Emirate. (p. 367)

and

105. Wutana, population 1,075 in Bauchi Emirate. (p. 431).

Roger Blench also cites Temple in his Atlas of Nigerian languages. Nothing is known of this language apart from its name and location, including whether it even exists.

== Bibliography ==
- Temple, Olive. 1922. Notes on the Tribes, Provinces, Emirates and States of the Northern Provinces of Nigeria. Argus Printing and Publishing Co. Cape Town. pp. 367, 431.
