= Ngie language =

Bantoid language spoken in Cameroon

Ngie
- Pronunciation: ŋɡiə
- Native to: Cameroon
- Native speakers: 37,000 (2001)
- Language family: Niger–Congo?: Atlantic–Congo; Benue–Congo; Southern Bantoid; Momo; Ngie
- Dialects: Mengum

Language codes
- ISO 639-3: ngj
- Glottolog: ngie1242

Ngie is a Southern Bantoid language of Cameroon. A variety called Mengum is only 56% lexically similar, and so should perhaps be considered a distinct language.
