= Munka language =

Bantu language spoken in Cameroon

Munka
- Bamunka
- Ŋgieməkɔʼkə
- Native to: Cameroon
- Native speakers: 31,000 (2008)
- Language family: Niger–Congo?: Atlantic–Congo; Benue–Congo; Southern Bantoid; Grassfields; Ring; South; Munka

Language codes
- ISO 639-3: bvm
- Glottolog: bamu1256

Bamunka, or Ngiemekohke (Ŋgieməkɔʼkə Bamunka pronunciation: [ˈŋgiěꜜmə́ˌkɔ̀ʔkə̌]) is a Grassfields Bantu language of Cameroon.

== Phonology ==
=== Consonants ===
Consonants
		Labial	Alveolar	Palatal	Velar	Labial-velar	Glottal
Plosive/ Affricate	Voiceless		/t/	/t͡ʃ/	/k/	/k͡p/	/ʔ/
Plosive/ Affricate	Voiced	/b/	/d/	/d͡ʒ/	/g/		
Fricative	Voiceless	/f/	/s/	/ʃ/			
Fricative	Voiced	/v/		/ʒ/	/ɣ/		
Nasal		/m/	/n/	/ɲ/	/ŋ/		
Approximant			/l/	/j/		/w/	

- /b/ and /m/ are bilabial, whereas /f/ and /v/ are labiodental.
- /ɲ/ and /j/ are palatal, whereas /t͡ʃ/, /d͡ʒ/, /ʃ/, and /ʒ/ are post-alveolar.

=== Vowels ===
Vowels
	Front	Central	Back
Close	/i/	/ɨ/	/u/
Mid-close	/e/	/ə/	/o/
Mid-open	/ɛ/		/ɔ/
Open	/a/		

=== Tones ===
In addition, Munka has five phonemic tones: three level tones (high, mid, and low) and two contour tones (rising, and falling).

== Orthography ==
Ngeloh Takwe proposed this orthography in her post-graduate diploma dissertation in 2002.

Bamunka alphabet (2002)
Letters	a	b	c	d	e	ɛ	ə	f	gh	g	h	ɨ	j	k	kp	l	m	n	ny	ŋ	o	ɔ	s	sh	t	u	v	w	y	zh
IPA	/a/	/b/	/t͡ʃ/	/d/	/e/	/ɛ/	/ə/	/f/	/ɣ/	/g/	/ʔ/	/ɨ/	/d͡ʒ/	/k/	/k͡p/	/l/	/m/	/n/	/ɲ/	/ŋ/	/o/	/ɔ/	/s/	/ʃ/	/t/	/u/	/v/	/w/	/j/	/ʒ/
