= Fang language (Cameroon) =

African language native to Cameroon

Fang
- Native to: Cameroon
- Native speakers: 4,000 (2011)
- Language family: Niger–Congo?: Atlantic–Congo; Benue–Congo; Southern Bantoid; Western Beboid (geographic); Fang

Language codes
- ISO 639-3: fak
- Glottolog: fang1248
- ELP: Fang

Fang is a Southern Bantoid language of Cameroon.

"Fang" is the name of the village the language is spoken in.

== Phonology ==
Fang Consonant Phonemes
		Labial	Labiodental	Dental	Palatal	Velar
Nasal		m	ɱ	n̪	ɲ	ŋ
Plosive	voiceless	p		t̪		k
Plosive	voiced	b		d̪		g
Affricate	voiceless			t̪s̪	tʃ	kp
Affricate	voiced				dʒ	gb
Fricative	voiceless		f	s̪		
Fricative	voiced		v		ʒ	
Approximant				l̪	j	w

Fang Vowel Phonemes
	Front		Central	Back	
	Less rounded	Plain	Central	Less rounded	Plain
Close	i̜	i		u̜	u
Close-mid	e		ə	o	
Open-mid	ɛ		ə	ɔ	
Open			a		

There are three tones; high, mid, and low.
