= Wushi language =

Grassfields language of Cameroon

Wushi
- Babessi
- Native to: Cameroon, Nigeria?
- Native speakers: 25,000 in Cameroon (2008)
- Language family: Niger–Congo?: Atlantic–Congo; Benue–Congo; Southern Bantoid; Grassfields; Ring; South; Wushi

Language codes
- ISO 639-3: Either: bse – Wushi nsc – Nshi (?)
- Glottolog: wush1238 Wushi nshi1235 Nshi (unattested)

Wushi (Babessi) is a Grassfields language of Cameroon.

It might be the same language as adjacent, unattested Nshi across the border in Nigeria.
