= Mmen language =

Grassfields language spoken in Cameroon

Mmen
- Bafmeng
- Native to: Cameroon
- Native speakers: (35,000 cited 2001)
- Language family: Niger–Congo?: Atlantic–Congo; Benue–Congo; Southern Bantoid; Grassfields; Ring; Center; Mmen

Language codes
- ISO 639-3: bfm
- Glottolog: mmen1238
- ELP: Fungom

Mmen (autonym: Bafmeng) is a Grassfields Bantu language of Cameroon.

As a Centre Ring language of Narrow Grassfields, a subdivision of Wide Grassfields within the Southern Bantoid languages, Mmen is part of a cluster including six other languages i.e. Babanki, Bum, Kom, Kuk, Kung and Oku.

== Etymology ==
The name Mmen ([mɛn]) comes from the verb sé mwɛ̀yn [sémɣɛ̀yn] 'to open up thick bush-covered land' and is used by the speakers referring to both their language and their land.

Ethnologue and ALCAM, Atlas Linguistique du Cameroon use the name and spelling Mmen.

Bafumen is the name of the village where the largest number of speakers is found i.e. 30 000 and the name adopted by German colonizers for the area and formerly used for the language. Other villages where Mmen is spoken are Cha’, Yemgeh, Nyos, Ipalim among others.

== Phonology ==
=== Consonants ===
Mmen has 27 phonemic consonants.

| | | Labial | Alveolar | Palato-alveolar | Velar | Labial–velar |
|---|---|---|---|---|---|---|
| Plosive | voiceless | /p/ | /t/ | | /k/ (Note: [k] is in complementary distribution with [ʔ]. [ʔ] appears root medially and root finally, and [k] appears elsewhere.) | /k͡p/ |
| Plosive | voiced | /ᵐb/ | /ⁿd/ | | /ᵑg/ | |
| Affricate | voiceless | /p͡f/ | /t͡s/ | /t͡ʃ/ | | |
| Affricate | voiced | /ᵐb͡v/ | /ⁿd͡z/ | /ⁿd͡ʒ/ | | |
| Fricative | voiceless | /f/ | /s/ | /ʃ/ | | |
| Fricative | voiced | /v/ | /z/ | /ʒ/ | /ɣ/ | |
| Nasal | | /m/ | /n/ | /ɲ/ (Note: /ɲ/ sometimes depalatalizes to [n] between vowels.) | /ŋ/ | |
| Lateral | | | /l/ | | | |
| Approximant | | | | /j/ | | /w/ |

=== Vowels ===
==== Monophthongs ====
Mmen has 9 phonemic monophthongs.

| | Front | Central | Back |
|---|---|---|---|
| Close | /i/ | | /u/ |
| Close-mid | /e/ (Note: /e/ optionally diphthongizes to [ei̯].) (Note: /e/ optionally becomes [i] at the beginning of a word.) | /ə/ (Note: [ɨ] is an optional allophone of /ə/.) | /o/ (Note: [ʊ] is an optional allophone of /o/.) |
| Open-mid | /ɛ/ | /ɜ/ | /ɔ/ |
| Open | | /ä/ | |

==== Diphthongs ====
Mmen also has six phonemic diphthongs, all ending in /i/.

| | Front | Central | Back |
|---|---|---|---|
| Close-mid | | əi̯ | oi̯ |
| Open-mid | ɛi̯ | ɜi̯ | ɔi̯ |
| Open | | äi̯ | |

=== Tone ===
Mmen has 9 phonemic tones. There are three level tones (high, mid, and low) and six contour tones (high-low, high-mid, mid-low, mid-high, low-mid, and low-falling).

== Bibliography ==
- Agha-ah, Chiatoh Blasius (April 1993). The Noun Class System of Mmen (post-graduate diploma thesis). University of Yaoundé.
- Agha, Grace Beh (September 1987). The Phonology of Mmen (post-graduate diploma thesis). University of Yaoundé.
- Bangha, George F. (2003). The Mmen Noun Phrase (Thesis). hdl:11858/00-001M-0000-0012-7FC1-6.
- Björkestedt, Lena (2010). A Phonological Sketch of the Mmen Language (PDF). CABTAL. Archived from the original (PDF) on 2018-03-16.
- Björkestedt, Lena (2011). Mmen Orthography Guide. SIL.
- Huey, Paul; Mbongue, Joseph; Troyer, Duane (May 1995). A rapid appraisal survey of Mmen (ALCAM 821) and Aghem dialects (ALCAM 810), Menchum Division, Northwest Province (Report). SIL Cameroon.
