= Baba language =

Grassfields Bantu language of Cameroon

Baba
- Papiak
- Supapyak’
- Region: Cameroon
- Ethnicity: Papiak
- Native speakers: 25,000 (2005)
- Language family: Niger–Congo?: Atlantic–Congo; Volta-Congo; Benue–Congo; Bantoid; Southern Bantoid; Grassfields; Eastern Grassfields; Mbam-Nkam; Nun; Baba

Language codes
- ISO 639-3: bbw
- Glottolog: baba1264

The Baba language, Supapyak’, is a Grassfields Bantu language of Cameroon.

== Phonology ==
Baba has a (C)V(C) syllable structure, with syllabic nasals. The only phonemes that can occur in the final position are /p, m, ŋ, ʔ, r/ and /x/. There are no vowel-initial roots but they can form morphemes.

Baba Consonant Phonemes
		Labial	Coronal	Palatal	Velar	Labial-velar	Glottal
Plosive	voiceless	p	t		k	k͡p	ʔ
Plosive	voiced					ɡ͡b	
Nasal		m	n	ɲ	ŋ	ŋ͡m	
Trill			r				
Fricative	voiceless	f	s	ʃ	x		
Fricative	voiced	v			ɣ		
Approximant			l	j			
Affricate			t͡s	t͡ʃ			

Between nasals and vowels, voiceless stops become voiced; a noticeable exception is /ɡ͡b/, which is its own separate phoneme. There are also some additional phonological processes that create the allophones of [r~d͡z], [l~d], [j~d͡ʒ], and [ɣ~g~w].

Baba Vowel Phonemes
	Front	Central	Back
Close	i	ɨ	u
Mid	e	ə	o
Open		a	

Vowels are also punctuated with contrastive high and low tones.
