= Isu language =

Grassfields language spoken in Cameroon

Isu
- Idzəŋi Isu, Idzəŋi Usu
- Native to: Cameroon
- Region: Menchum
- Native speakers: (15,000 cited 1993)
- Language family: Niger–Congo?: Atlantic–Congo; Benue–Congo; Southern Bantoid; Grassfields; Ring; North; Isu

Language codes
- ISO 639-3: isu
- Glottolog: isum1240
- ELP: Isu (Northwest Region, Cameroon)

Isu (Essu) is a Grassfields Bantu language of Cameroon.

== Writing system ==
Isu alphabet
| A | B | Bv | Ch | D | Dz | E | F | G | Gb | Gh | H | I | Ɨ | J | K | Kp | L | M | N | Ŋ | O | Ɔ | P | Pf | S | Sh | T | Ts | U | V | W | Y | Z | ' |
| a | b | bv | ch | d | dz | e | f | g | gb | gh | h | i | ɨ | j | k | kp | l | m | n | ŋ | o | ɔ | p | pf | s | sh | t | ts | u | v | w | y | z | ' |
