= Kuk language =

Grassfields Bantu language of Cameroon

Kuk
- Native to: Cameroon
- Native speakers: (3,000 cited 1993)
- Language family: Niger–Congo?: Atlantic–Congo; Benue–Congo; Southern Bantoid; Grassfields; Ring; Center; Kuk

Language codes
- ISO 639-3: kfn
- Glottolog: kukk1239
- ELP: Kuk

Kuk is a Grassfields Bantu language of Cameroon.

== Proposed Kumfutu language ==
In the late 1980s and early 1990s, some people from the village of Kumfutu (traditionally an ethnic Kuk village) were discontent with Kuk leadership and founded the Kumfutu Student Association as a result. The peopole of Kumfutu wanted to become independent from the Kuk, and thus proposed a new "Kumfutu" language. However, by 2010, the people of Kumfutu were no longer in conflict with the Kuk leadership.

| Gloss | Kumfutu | Kuk |
|---|---|---|
| fufu | kə́bál/kə́bán/kə́bánə́ | kə́bá |
| corn beer | zə̀-kə́n-dzɔ̄ŋ | káŋ |
| raffia wine | ndzéí-sə̀ fə́bə́-sə́ (white urine) | lə̀-m fə̀bə̂-m (white wine) |
| book | kə̀màʼlə̀ | kə́ŋwàlə̀ |
| mother | nôː | nə̂ː |
| child | wéí | wāī |
| market | bə́kə́wɛ́í | bə́kə́wə́n |
| let's go | á nwô | á ŋwô |
| you (in greetings) | gha (plural) | wu (singular) |
| sleep (in greetings) | bilə | bei |

The case of Kumfutu serves as an example of how language change in Africa often closely linked to the need for ethnic differentation.
