= Laimbue language =

Grassfields Bantu language of Cameroon

Laimbue
- Native to: Cameroon
- Native speakers: (5,000 cited 1994)
- Language family: Niger–Congo?: Atlantic–Congo; Benue–Congo; Southern Bantoid; Grassfields; Ring; West; Laimbue

Language codes
- ISO 639-3: lmx
- Glottolog: laim1240

Laimbue is a Grassfields Bantu language of Cameroon.
