= Weh language =

Grassfields Bantu language of Cameroon

Weh
- Native to: Cameroon
- Native speakers: (8,000 cited 1993)
- Language family: Niger–Congo?: Atlantic–Congo; Benue–Congo; Southern Bantoid; Grassfields; Ring; West; Weh

Language codes
- ISO 639-3: weh
- Glottolog: wehh1238

Weh is a Grassfields Bantu language of Cameroon.
