= Oku language =

Grassfields language spoken in Cameroon

Oku
- Kuɔ
- Native to: Cameroon
- Native speakers: 87,000 (from the 2005 census)
- Language family: Niger–Congo?: Atlantic–Congo; Benue–Congo; Southern Bantoid; Grassfields; Ring; Center; Oku

Language codes
- ISO 639-3: oku
- Glottolog: okuu1243

Oku (Ebkuo, Ekpwo, Ukfwo, Bvukoo, Kuɔ) is a Grassfields Bantoid language that is primarily spoken by the Oku people of northwest Cameroon, a fondom of the Tikar people. They are a different ethnic group from the Oku people of Sierra Leone.

== Phonology ==
=== Consonants ===
Oku has 21 consonant phonemes. The consonant phoneme inventory of the language is shown below.

		Labial		Alveolar		Palatal	Velar	
		Labial		Alveolar		Palatal	Plain	Labialized
Stop/Affricate	voiceless			/t/		/t͡ʃ/	/k/	/kʷ/
Stop/Affricate	voiced	/b/		/d/		/d͡ʒ/	/g/	/gʷ/
Fricative	voiceless	/f/		/s/				
Fricative	voiced						/ɣ/	/ɣʷ/
Nasal		/m/	/m̩/ (Note: a syllabic /m/)	/n/	//N// (Note: an archiphoneme that only appears stem-initially)		/ŋ/	
Lateral				/l/				
Glide						/j/		/w/

Davis argues that Oku has five nasal phonemes. These are three non-syllabic nasals (/m/, /n/, and /ŋ/), syllabic /m̩/, and archiphonemic //N//. /m̩/ does not assimilate to the following consonant. However //N// assimilates before all consonants except /f/, /t͡ʃ/, and /d͡ʒ/, where it becomes /n/.

=== Vowels ===
Davis describes the following vowels in her thesis.

		Front		Back			
		Front		Unrounded		Rounded	
High	Tense	/i/	/iː/			/u/	/uː/
High	Lax	/ɪ/	/ɪː/				
Mid	Tense			/ə/	/əː/		
Mid	Lax	/ɛ/	/ɛː/			/ɔ/	/ɔː/
Low				/ɑ/	/ɑː/		

== Orthography ==
The Oku alphabet has 25 letters.

a	b	ch	d	dz	e	ɛ	ə	f	g	gh	i	j	k	l	m	n	ŋ	o	p	s	t	w	y	z
