= Kung language (Cameroon) =

Grassfields Bantu language of Cameroon

Kung
- Native to: Cameroon
- Native speakers: The Nzonko dialect was spoken during the 2000s, but now probably extinct. The Nkam dialect is originated from the frontier with Nigeria, today spoken a undated number of 12. The Zoro dialect was discovered in 2003, now at least 1 person remember words of this dialect. (2019)
- Language family: Niger–Congo?: Atlantic–Congo languages; Benue–Congo languages; Southern Bantoid languages; Grassfields; Ring; Center; Kung

Language codes
- ISO 639-3: kfl
- Glottolog: kung1260
- ELP: Kung

Kung is a Grassfields Bantu language of Cameroon.

== Phonology ==
=== Consonants ===
Tatang (2016) enumerates 24 plain consonants, 9 prenasalized consonants, 7 labialized consonants, and 6 palatalized consonants, for a total of 46.

		Labial				Alveolar				Palatal (-alveolar)				Velar				Labial -velar	Glottal
		plain	pren.	pal.	lab.	plain	pren.	pal.	lab.	plain	pren.	pal.	lab.	plain	pren.	pal.	lab.	Labial -velar	Glottal
Nasal		m			mʷ	n				ɲ							ŋʷ		
Plosive	voiceless					t	ⁿt	tʲ						k	ᵑk	kʲ	kʷ	kp	ʔ
Plosive	voiced	b	ᵐb	bʲ	bʷ	d	ⁿd								ᵑɡ			ɡb	
Affricate	voiceless					ts				tʃ									
Affricate	voiced		ᵐbv				ⁿdz			dʒ									
Fricative	voiceless			fʲ	fʷ	s				ʃ			ʃʷ						
Fricative	voiced					z	ⁿz			ʒ	ⁿʒ	ʒʲ		ɣ					
Approximant						l		lʲ	lʷ	j							w		
Trill		ʙ																	

=== Vowels ===
Tatang (2016) counts 10 vowel phonemes.

	Front	Central		Back
Close	i	ɨ	ʉ	u
Close-mid	e			o
Open-mid	ɛ			ɔ
Open		ä		

=== Tones ===
Kung contrasts six tones: three level tones (high, mid, low) and three contour tones (rising, high-mid, and falling). Tatang (2016) argues that the contour tones are combinations of register tones.
