= Southern Bantoid languages =

Branch of the Bantoid family of Niger–Congo languages

Southern Bantoid
- Geographic distribution: Sub-Saharan Africa, but not further west than Nigeria
- Linguistic classification: Niger–Congo?: Atlantic–Congo; Volta–Congo; Benue–Congo; Bantoid; Southern Bantoid
- Proto-language: Proto-Southern Bantoid
- Subdivisions: Bendi; Tivoid; East Beboid; Fang language (Cameroon); Buru–Angwe; Mamfe (Nyang); Furu †; Ekoid–Mbe; West Beboid ?; Grassfields; Bishuo †; Busuu †; Bantu

Language codes
- Glottolog: sout3152
- The Southern Bantoid languages shown within the Niger–Congo language family. Non-Southern Bantoid languages are greyscale.

Southern Bantoid (or South Bantoid) is a branch of the Bantoid language family. It consists of the Bantu languages along with several small branches and isolates of eastern Nigeria and west-central Cameroon (though the affiliation of some branches is uncertain). Since the Bantu languages are spoken across most of Sub-Saharan Africa, Southern Bantoid comprises 643 languages as counted by Ethnologue, though many of these are mutually intelligible.

== History ==
The Southern Bantoid branches of Nigeria and Cameroon

Southern Bantoid was first introduced by Williamson in a proposal that divided Bantoid into North and South branches.

The unity of the North Bantoid group was subsequently called into question, and Bantoid itself may be polyphyletic, but the work did establish Southern Bantoid as a valid genetic unit, something that has not happened for (Narrow) Bantu itself.

== Internal classification ==
According to Williamson and Blench, Southern Bantoid is divided into the various Narrow Bantu languages, Jarawan, Tivoid, Beboid, Mamfe (Nyang), Grassfields and Ekoid families. The Bendi languages are of uncertain classification; they have traditionally been classified with Cross River, but they may actually be Southern Bantoid. Blench suggests that Tivoid, Momo (ex-Grassfields) and East Beboid may form a group, perhaps with the uncertain languages Esimbi and Buru–Angwe:

- ? Bendi
- Tivoid–Beboid: Tivoid, Esimbi, East Beboid, ? Buru–Angwe, ? Menchum
- West Beboid (geographic)
- Furu
- Mamfe
- Ekoid–Mbe: Ekoid, Mbe
- Grassfields: Ring, Eastern Grassfields (Mbam–Nkam), Momo, ? Ndemli, Southwest Grassfields (Western Momo), ? Ambele
- Narrow Bantu, Jarawan–Mbam

=== Grollemund (2012) ===
Classification of Southern Bantoid by Grollemund (2012):

- Southern Bantoid
  - Nyang
  - - Ekoid
    - - - Beboid
        - Tivoid
      - - Wide Grassfields
        - - A40-60-Jarawan + A31 (Mbam, Jarawan, Bube)
          - Bantu

== Numerals ==
Comparison of numerals in individual languages:

Classification	Language	1	2	3	4	5	6	7	8	9	10
Bantu	Luganda	emu	bbiri	ssatu	nnya	ttaano	mukaaga	musanvu	munaana	mwenda	kkumi
Ndemli	Ndemli	mɔ̀hɔ́	ífɛ́	ítáá	ítʃìjè	ítâŋ	tóhó	sàᵐbá	fɔ̀ːmɔ́	bùʔɛ̀	dʒòm
Tikar	Tikar	mbɔʔ	ɓî	lê	ɲî	ʃæ̃̂	ɸyulu	ʃâmɓì	nìnì	tæ̂nì	wûm
Tivoid	Esimbi (1)	kēnə̄	mə̄rākpə̄	mākə̄lə̄	mōɲī	mātə̄nə̀	mālālə̄	mātə̄nə̀ mə̄rākpə̄ (5+ 2)	mōɲìōɲī (4+ 4)	mātə̄nə̀ mōɲī (5 + 4)	būɣù
Tivoid	Esimbi (2)	ɔ-nə	râkpə	á-kələ	oɲí	a-tənə	a-lələ	à-tən râkpə (5+ 2)	ò-ɲi o-ɲí (4+ 4)	à-tən o-ɲí (5 + 4)	bùɣù
Tivoid	Ipulo	émɔ̀	víàl	vétàt	véɲì	vétàn	véɾátúm	véɾátúm nɔ̀mɔ̀ (6 + 1)	víɲèɲí	víɲèɲí nɔ̀mɔ̀ (8 + 1)	épɔ́ːt
Tivoid	Iyive	mɔ̌m	hjâl	tàt	ɲîn	táŋə̀n	kə̀lə̀kə̀tàt	kə̀lə̀kə̀tàt kàt mɔ̀mú (6 + 1)	kíníkìnì	táŋìɲìn (5 + 4 ??)	pùɛ̀
Tivoid	Tiv	mɔ̀ḿ / mɔ́m	úhár	útáŕ	únjì:	útã́ː	átérátáŕ	útã́ː kàː úhár (5 + 2)	ániènì	útã́ː kàː únjì: (5 + 4)	púè / púwè
Grassfields, Menchum	Befang	móʔ (~mʊ́ʔ)	fe	táí	ɪ̀kᶣà (ɪ̀kɥà)	ɪ̀tʲə̂n	ⁿdʊ̀fú	èkᶣànátáí (4 and 3) i.e. (4+ 3)	éfómó	étʲə̂nékᶣà (5+ 4)	éɣúm
Grassfields, Mbam-Nkam, Bamileke	Fe'fe' (1)	nshʉ̀'	pʉ́ɑ́	tāā	kwɑ̀	tî	ntōhō	sə̀ǝ̀mbʉ́ɑ́	hə̀ǝ̄	vʉ̄'ʉ̄	ghām
Grassfields, Mbam-Nkam, Bamileke	Fe'fe' (2)	nshʉ̀'	pʉ́ɑ́	tāā	kwɑ̀	tî	ntōhō	sə̀ǝ̀mbʉ́ɑ́	hə̀ə̄	vʉ̄'ʉ̄	ghām
Grassfields, Mbam-Nkam, Bamileke	Ghomala	yaə́mu'	yaə́pʉə́ə́	yaə́tâ	yápfʉə̀	yaə́tɔ̂	ntɔkɔ́	sɔmbʉə́ə́	hɔ̌m	vʉ'ʉ́	ghǎm
Grassfields, Mbam-Nkam, Bamileke	Mengaka (Megaka)	yimɔ'ɔ / mɔ'	yipá / pa	yitét / tét	nəkwɔ̀	yitɛ	ntɔ̌	sambá	nəhǎ	nəvø'	nəghám
Grassfields, Mbam-Nkam, Bamileke	Nda'nda'	ncə̀'	pə́ə́	té	kwò	tɔ̀	tó	sòmbə́ə́	χóp	vɨ̀ʔ	gháp
Grassfields, Mbam-Nkam, Bamileke	Ngiemboon	mmɔ́'ɔ	mbʉ́a	ntá	lekùa	ntʉ̂a	ntɔɡɔ́	sɔ̀ɔn mbʉ́a	lefɔ̌ɔn	lepfwɔʼɔ́	leɡém
Grassfields, Mbam-Nkam, Bamileke	Ngomba	yɛ́mɔ́'	yɛ́pá	yɛ́tát	yɛ́nɛ́kwa	yɛ́taa	yɛ́nɛ́ntúkú	saambá	yɛ́nɛ́fɔ́m	yɛ́nɛ́pfú'ú	nɛɡɛ́m
Grassfields, Mbam-Nkam, Bamileke	Ngombale	tá	pwó	tárə	kwo	taa	toɣə	saabwó	ləfaa	ləpfuʔú	ləɡham
Grassfields, Mbam-Nkam, Bamileke	Ngwe	mɔ'fi	-biə	-tat	lɛkwə	-tɛ	-ntuli	saambiə	lɛfɔ	lɛʙə̌ʔá	lɛ̄ɣɛ̀m
Grassfields, Mbam-Nkam, Bamileke	Yemba (Dschang)	wɔ́mɔ'ɔ́	mémpīā	métɛ́t	lekua	metáa	ntokó	esambīā	lefaá	levu'ɔ́	legēm
Grassfields, Mbam-Nkam, Ngemba	Awing (1)	mɔ̌	pɛ́	térə́	nə̀kwà	ténə̀	tóɣə́	sàmbɛ́	nə̀fémə́	nə̀púʔə́	nə̀ɣə́mə́
Grassfields, Mbam-Nkam, Ngemba	Awing (2)	mɔh	pəːə	teːre	kwa	taa	ntuɡu	saːmbe	nɨfeːme	nɨpueh	nɨɡeːme
Grassfields, Mbam-Nkam, Ngemba	Bafut (1)	mɔ́ʔɔ̂	báà	tárə̀	kwàà	ntáà	ntóʔò	sàmbà	fwámə́	kwálìʔí / nɨ̀bùʔû	tàwûm / nɨ̀wûm
Grassfields, Mbam-Nkam, Ngemba	Bafut (2)	mɔʔɔ̂	baa	tarə	kwà	ǹtaà	ntoʔo	sàmbà	fwamə	kwalɛ̀ʔɛ	tàɡhûm
Grassfields, Mbam-Nkam, Ngemba	Bambili-Bambui (1)	mɔ̀ʔɔ̀	bə̀ɡə̀	tyè	kyà	tɔ̀ɔ̀	ntúú	ʃàmbà	nɨ̀fɔ̀ɔ̀	nɨ̀bɛ̀ʔɛ̀	nɨ̀ɣám
Grassfields, Mbam-Nkam, Ngemba	Bambili-Bambui (2)	mɔʔɔ	bɨɡə	tyé	kɥa	tɔː	n-túː	ʃambá	nɨ-fɔː	nɨ-bɛʔɛ	nɨ-ɣám
Grassfields, Mbam-Nkam, Ngemba	Bamukumbit	m²mɔʔɔ⁷⁷ or tɑʔ	bɛ, bɨbɛ, mɨmbɛ	tɑrɨ, bɨ²tɑː⁷⁵ɾə², mɨntɑrɨ	nɨkwɑ, bɨnɨkwɑ, mɨnkwɑ	jitɑ̃, bɨtɑ̃, mɨntɑ̃	jintoʔ, bɨntoʔ, mɨntoʔ	ʃɑmbɛ, bɨʃɑmbɛ, mɨʃɑmbɛ	nɨfɔ̃, bɨnɨfɔ̃, mɨnɨfɔ̃	nɨ²buʔ²¹, bɨnɨbuʔ, mɨnɨbuʔ	nɨwũ
Grassfields, Mbam-Nkam, Ngemba	Mendankwe-Nkwen	mɔ̄h	bəɡə	tarɔ	kua	tan	ntɔ̄	sāmbā	nəfah	nəbuɔ̄h	nəɣəm
Grassfields, Mbam-Nkam, Ngemba	Mbəkum (Mankon) (1)	mɔ́ʔɔ̂	bâ	tárə̂	kwà	tánə̀	ntúɣú	sàmbà	nɨ̀fámə́	nɨ̀bùʔû	nɨ̀ɣɨ̂m
Grassfields, Mbam-Nkam, Ngemba	Ngemba (Mankon) (2)	mɔ́ʔɔ́	bǎ	táré	kwà	tâŋ	ntúɡhə̂	sámbǎ	nɨ̀fə̂ŋ	nɨ̀bvùʔə́	nɨ̀wúmə̀
Grassfields, Mbam-Nkam, Ngemba	Pinyin	mɔ́ʔɔ̀	páá	táɾə̀	kwà	tânə̀	ǹtô	sàmbâ	nə̀fámə̂	nə̀pùʔə̂	nə̀wúmə̀
Grassfields, Mbam-Nkam, Nkambe	Kwaja	mũũ ˧˩	baa ˦˧	ta ˦	kɥ ˧˩	tɔ̃ ˦˧	tɔ̃ ˨ fũ ˧	sə ˨ mba ˧˨	wɔ ˦ ŋkxɨt ˦	bə ˦ ʁət ˨	wəm˦
Grassfields, Mbam-Nkam, Nkambe	Limbum (1)	mɔ̀ʔsíɾ	báː	táːɾ	kjèː	tâ	ntūːnfú	sàːmbâ	wāːmí	bɨ̀ʔɨ̂ / bɨ̀ɾɨ̂	ɾɨ
Grassfields, Mbam-Nkam, Nkambe	Limbum (2)	mòʔsír	báā	táar	kyèe	tâ	ntūunfú	sàambâ	wāamé	bʉ̀ʔʉ̂	rʉ̂ʉ
Grassfields, Mbam-Nkam, Nkambe	Mfumte (Koffa)	mìʔincí	bʉ́à	tó	kweé	tóŋ	ntunfúu	sɔ̀mbaa	wáamí	búum	húʔum
Grassfields, Mbam-Nkam, Nkambe	Yamba	mòʔfís	bá	tɛʔ	kwè	tàŋ	ntuuŋfú	sàmbâ	fwamɛʔ	və̀kɛʔ	húm
Grassfields, Mbam-Nkam, Nun	Baba1 (Papia) (1)	mɔ̀ʔ	mbá	ntí	kúá	tè	ntíóʔó	kpataɾ	fómə́	ʃìpó	kòɣəm
Grassfields, Mbam-Nkam, Nun	Baba (Papia) (2)	jimàa / jímɔ̀	jípàa / ji mbá	ji tára / ji ntíi	ji kwà / kpa	ji tè	ntúwó / tuʔo	kwàtar / kpataɾ	fómə	tʃìpóo / ʃipɔ	kòɣəm / ɣəm
Grassfields, Mbam-Nkam, Nun	Bafanji	jimuʔu / muʔu³⁵ / tiʔæ⁵³	jipɑɑ / piæ³⁵	jitii / tii³⁵	jikwə / kwə³	jintɑ̃ĩ⁵³ / tɑ̃ĩ⁵³	jintou / ntou⁵	jikwætæ / kwætæ³⁵	jifũɔ̃ / fũɔ̃⁵	jipuʔu / puʔu³⁵	jiɣwũ / ɣwũ⁵³
Grassfields, Mbam-Nkam, Nun	Bamali (Papia)	mʷəʔə	pɛt	tɛt	kʷa	ta	ntɔ	kʷatʃø	nəfɔː	nəpuʔu	nəɣu
Grassfields, Mbam-Nkam, Nun	Bambalang	tɛʔi	paa	tɾe	kʰwɛ	tiɛ̃	ntiɡaw	kwatʃəɨ	fuõ	ndipoʔu	wuŋ
Grassfields, Mbam-Nkam, Nun	Bamun (Shupamen) (1)	mòʔ	mbàá	tɛ́t	pkà	tɛ̀n	ntú	sàmbà	fámə́	kóvýʔ	ɣə́m
Grassfields, Mbam-Nkam, Nun	Bamun (Bamum) (2)	ímoʔ	ípáa	ítɛt	ípkwà	ítɛ̀n	ítúu	ísamba	ífámə	ívʉ̀ʔʉ́	ɣóm
Grassfields, Mbam-Nkam, Nun	Bangolan	mɔ̀	mbǎ	tét	kpà	tíjē	ǹtúhù	kpáte̙t	fó	tʃɛ̀ŋɔ́ʔɔ̀	vwó
Grassfields, Mbam-Nkam, Nun	Medumba	ncʉ'	bɑhɑ	tad	kwɑ̀	tɑ̂n	ntogǝ	sɑ̀mmbɑhɑ	fomə	bwə̀'ə	gham
Grassfields, Mbam-Nkam, Nun	Mungaka (Bali)	ɲín	íbáā	itɛ́t	ikwà	itàn	intwúʔ	kwàtát	ifúm	sʉibɔ́m	ɣóm / wɔm
Grassfields, Momo	Moghamo	ímɔ̄ʔ	íbē	ítád	íkwē	ítã	tìfóɣə́	sàmbé	fàmí	àbōɡ	ìɣùm
Grassfields, Momo	Mundani	yea-mɔʔ	bebe	betat	bekpì	betã̀ã̂	bentùa	besã̀ã̀mbe	befã̀ã	bebə̀ʔa	èɣɛm
Grassfields, Momo	Ngamambo (1)	-mɔ̀ʔ	be	tád	kwè	tân	rɨ̀fúɣɔ́ / rʌ̀fúɣɔ́	sàmbe	fàam	bɔ̀ɔk	ɣum
Grassfields, Momo	Ngamambo (2)	-mɔ̀ʔ	bé	tɑ́t	kwè	tɑ̂n	rɨ̀fúɣə́	sɑ̀mbé	fɑ̌m	ə̀bɔ̌k	wúm
Grassfields, Momo	Ngie (1)	ìfìŋ	ìbǐɡə	ìtá	ìkjùɡə	ìtɨŋ	ìfəw	ìsàmbìɡə	ìfɨŋì	àbəw	ìwùm
Grassfields, Momo	Ngie (2)	ìfìŋ	ìbǐɡ	ìtá	ìkɥǐɡ	ìtʉ̄ŋ	ìfœ́	ìsàmbǐɡ	ìfɔ̌ŋ	àbœ̀	ìwùm
Grassfields, Momo	Ngwo	ŋwāʔ	fjēː	tɛ́d	kwɛ̀	tân	m̀fó	sàːmbjɛ̄	fwɔ̌ː	kɔ̄ː	wūm
Grassfields, Ring	Bamunka (1)	mɔ̌ʔ	buǔ	tiâ	kʷì	taâ	ntɨ̌ʔ	tə́kʷiǐtiâ (4 + 3) ?	fɔ̌ŋ	bɔ̀mɔ̂ʔ (10–1) ?	wûŋ
Grassfields, Ring	Bamunka (2)	mɔʔ L	buː RF	tià F	kʷi L	ta F	ntʉ̀ʔ F	təkʷitia HHF (4 + 3) ?	fɔ̃ R	bɔmɔʔ R (10–1) ?	wũ L
Grassfields, Ring	Wushi	mùɔ́ʔ	bā	tɨ́ə̀ʔ	tsə̀	tɛ́ɛ̀	ǹtùɔ́ʔ	tsə̀tɨ́ə̀ʔ (4 + 3)	fə́mə́	bùfə̀mùɔ́ʔ (10–1) ?	vóó
Grassfields, Ring, Center	Babanki (Kejom)	mùʔ	bò	táʔ	kàʔ	tàn	ǹtʉ̀fə́	sòmbô	fwòmə́	àbʉ̀múʔ (10–1)	wúm
Grassfields, Ring, Center	Bum	mɔ̀k	bà	tât	kìk	tân	túfá	sàmbâ	fâmá	búlá mɔ̀k (10–1)	ìwûm
Grassfields, Ring, Center	Kom	nòʔ	bò	tal	kàe / kæ̀	tâyn	ntufa	nsòmbo / nsombô	nfama	bulamòʔ	ivɨm
Grassfields, Ring, Center	Kuk	mɔ̀ʔ	bòː	tóː	kɪ̀ːkò	tâː	tóːfə́	sōːmboː	fāːmə́	buː́mɔ̀ʔ (? -1)?	íɣə̄m
Grassfields, Ring, Center	Kung	mɔ̀ʔ	bə̀ː	tə́ː	kʲə̀kə̀	tàʲ	tūːfə́	sɛ̀ːⁿbɛː	fɛ̀ːmə́	bólímɔ̀ʔ (? -1)?	ìɣə̄m
Grassfields, Ring, Center	Mmen	mɔ̀ʔ	pɛ᷆	tá	kjā	tâɲ	tūfɜ́	sɛ̄mbɛ᷇	fāmmɜ́	pʊ̄lɜ̄mɔ̀ʔ (10–1)	ēɣə̆̀m
Grassfields, Ring, Center	Oku	mɔɔ	baa	taa	kwɪʲ	tan	ntuufə	saamba	ɛfaamə	buumək	ɛvəm
Grassfields, Ring, East	Lamnso'	mɔ̀ʔɔ́n	bàà	táár	kwɛ̀ɛ̀	tàn	ntùùfú	sààmbà	wāāmɛ́	bvə̀ʔə̀	ɣwə̀m
Grassfields, Ring, West	Aghem (1)	mɔ̀ʔ	bə̀ˠà	tə́ˠá	tʃʲàkò	tɛ̀ʲ	tǔ̞ː	sə̀ˠàⁿbə̄ˠā	ɪ́fǎː	tɛ̄ⁿdzū̞ˠū̞	ɪ́ɣə̄m
Grassfields, Ring, West	Aghem (2)	mɒ̀ʔ	bɨ̀ɣà	tɨ́ɣá	cìakɔ̀	tɛ̀	tǒo	sɨ̀ɣàmbɨ̀ɣà	ɛ́ʔfáa	tèndzùɣò	é-ʔɣɨ́m
Grassfields, Ring, West	Isu	mɔ̀ʔ	bèː(bè)	tsíː	tʃàʔì	tàː	ntsìfɔ́ŋ	sèmbè	fáːmə́	bùkə́	ívə̄m
Grassfields, Ring, West	Laimbue	mòʔ	bò	tó	kjə̀ʔ	táì	tɔ̀ɔ́	sùmbô	ìfámá	bə́lə́mɔ̀ʔ	ɨɣɨ́m
Grassfields, Ring, West	Weh	mó	bə̀ɣə́	tə̀ɣə́	kaikə́	tá	tùbə́	səɣ-mbə̀ɣ	ifám	tàndzú	iɣə́m
Yemne-Kimbi	Ajumbu	mʷə̀	fʲə̂ŋ	tò	ɲì	kpɛ̂	kʲàtò	nàtò	nànà	kpɛ̂ɲì	kòɲ
Yemne-Kimbi	Mundabli	m¹.mö³²	m¹.fɪe³²	n¹.tɔ³²	n¹.de²	kpɔn²	tʃi²ta²	nɔ¹³tɔ²	ne¹ne¹	kpa²ne¹	dzo²fɯ²
Yemne-Kimbi	Mungbam (Abar) (1)	-m̩̀ / -mù	-fìn /-fá	-tì / -tēè	-ɲ̩̀ / -nì	kpáān / kpōa	lētɛ̀ / -lētè	-ɲ̩̀tɛ̄ / -ɲītɛ	-nə̀nè / -nə̄nè	kpánə̀ɲ̩̀ / kpānāɲì	dʒūhɛ́ / dʒóhó
Yemne-Kimbi	Munbam (Munken) (2)	-mwə́nə̀ / -mù / – mù	-fè /-fō / -fé	-tɛ̄ / -tēa / -tè	-ɲə̄nə́ / -ɲì / -ɲì	kpòōnə́ / kpɛ̄n / kpààɲì	-lētɛ̀ / -létēa / -lētɛ̀	-ɲītɛ̀ / -ɲītə̀ / -ɲītɛ̀	-ɲīɲì ~ -ɲìɲì / --ɲìɲì / -ɲìɲì	kpɔ̄ndʒùɲì / -ɲìnkpɛ̄n	kwîn / kwîn / kwɔ̂n
