= Languages of Cameroon =

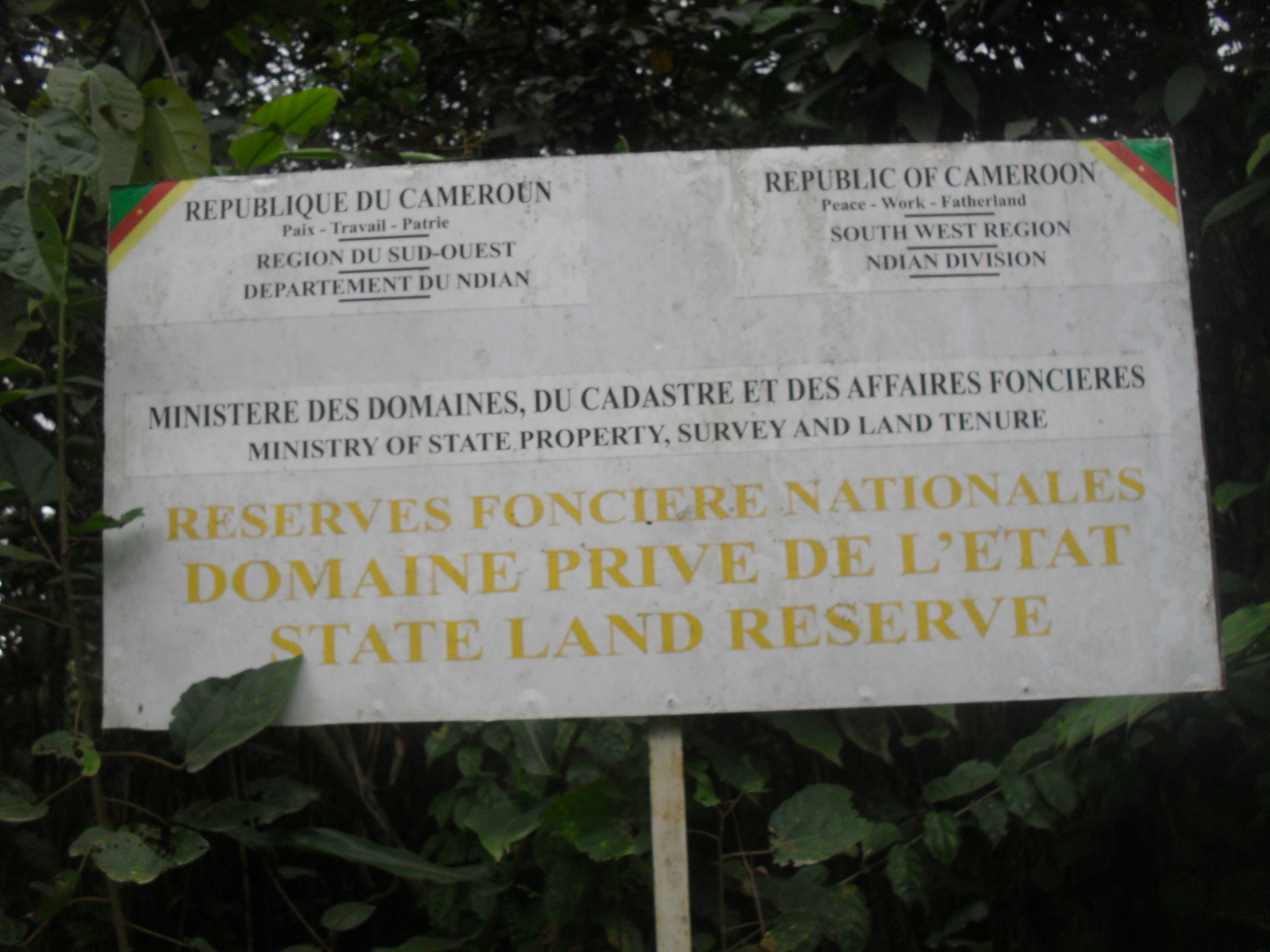
- Sign in Rumpi Hills in French and English
- Official: French, English
- National: 55 Afro-Asiatic languages, 2 Nilo-Saharan languages, and 173 Niger–Congo languages
- Signed: American Sign Language (Francophone African Sign Language)
- Keyboard layout: QWERTY
- Lingua franca(s): French, English, Camfranglais, Cameroonian Pidgin English, Fulfulde, Chadian Arabic

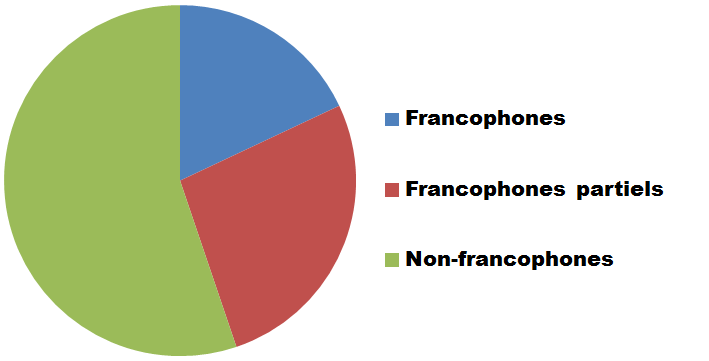
Knowledge of French in Cameroon in 2005, according to the OIF. In 2005, 18% of the population were "real" French speakers and another 26.8% were "partial French speakers". Both figures are estimations.

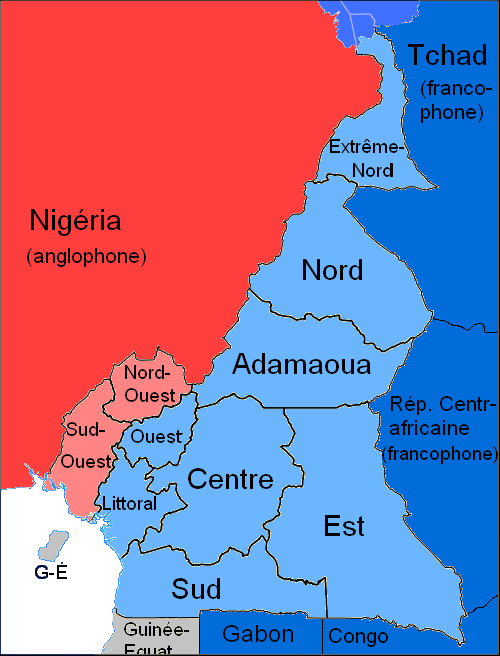
Map of Cameroon's official languages. Blue: French speaking regions and countries. Red: English speaking regions and countries. Grey: Trilingual Spanish, Portuguese and French speaking country (Equatorial Guinea).

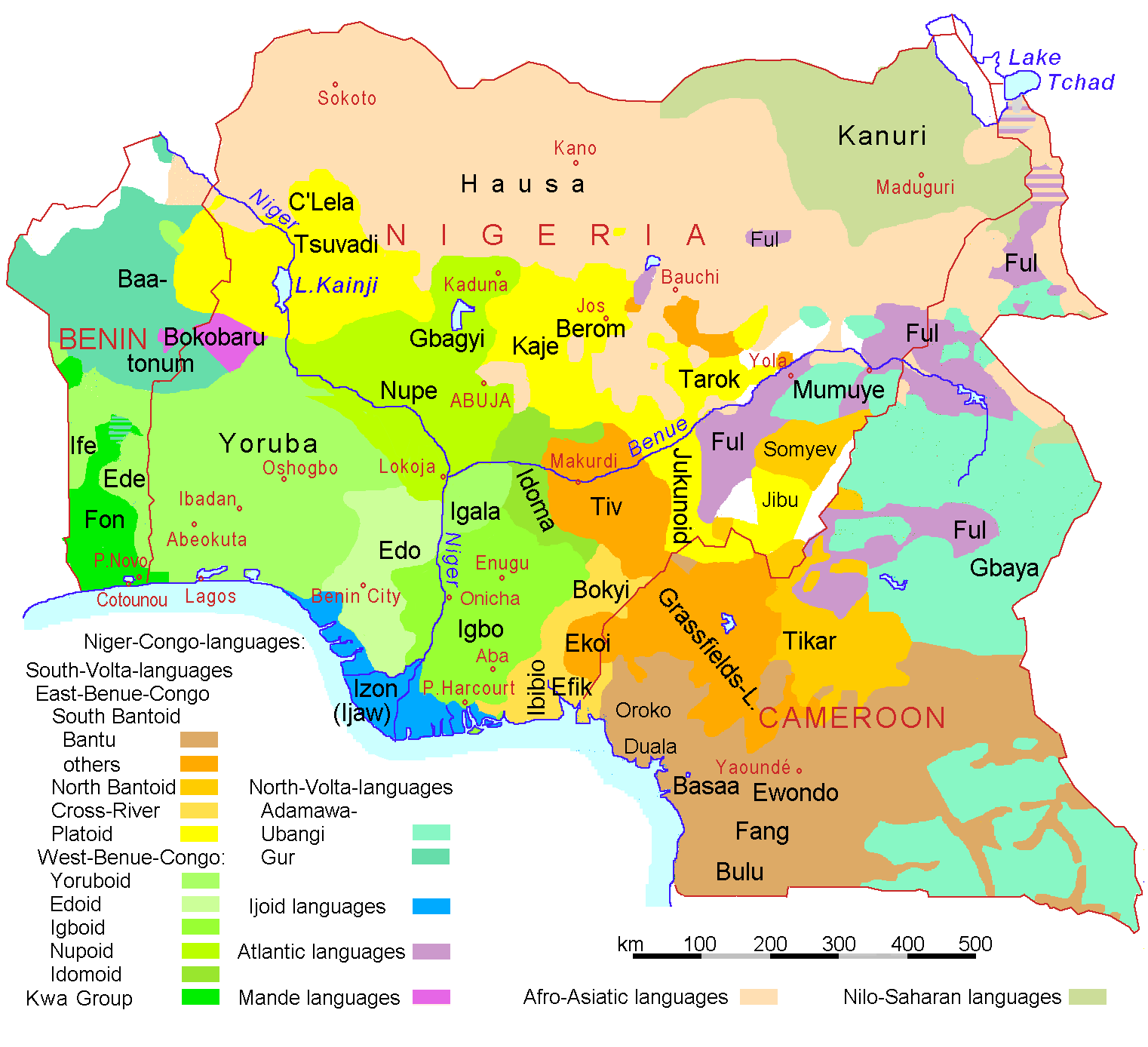
Map of the region's indigenous languages.

Cameroon is home to at least 250 languages, with some accounts reporting around 600. These include 55 Afro-Asiatic languages, two Nilo-Saharan languages, four Ubangian languages, and 169 Niger–Congo languages. This latter group comprises one Senegambian language (Fulfulde), 28 Adamawa languages, and 142 Benue–Congo languages (130 of which are Bantu languages). French and English are official languages, a heritage of Cameroon's colonial past as a colony of both France and the United Kingdom from 1916 to 1961. Eight out of the ten regions of Cameroon are primarily francophone and two are anglophone. The percentage of French and English speakers is estimated by the Presidency of Cameroon to be 70% and 30% respectively.

Cameroon is a predominantly Francophone country, though English is the official language of the former Southern Cameroons. As of 2024, 11.957 million (41.17%) out of 29.124 million people spoke French.

The nation strives toward bilingualism, but in reality a small minority (11.6%) Cameroonians are literate in both French and English, and 28.8% are literate in neither. The government has established several bilingual schools in an effort to teach both languages more evenly; however, in reality most of these schools separate the anglophone and francophone sections and therefore do not provide a true bilingual experience. Cameroon is a member of both the Commonwealth of Nations and La Francophonie. German, the country's official language during the German colonial period until World War I, has nowadays almost entirely yielded to its two successors. However, as a foreign language subject German still enjoys huge popularity among pupils and students, with 300,000 people learning or speaking German in Cameroon in 2010. Today, Cameroon is one of the African countries with the highest number of people with knowledge of German.

Most people in the English-speaking Northwest and Southwest regions speak Cameroonian Pidgin English, also called Kamtok, as a lingua franca. Fulfulde serves the same function in the north, and Ewondo in much of the Center, South, and East provinces. Camfranglais (or Frananglais) is a relatively new pidgin communication form emerging in urban areas and other locations where Anglophone and Francophone Cameroonians meet and interact. Popular singers have used the hybrid language and added to its popularity.

Education for the deaf in Cameroon uses American Sign Language, introduced by the deaf American missionary Andrew Foster.

There is little literature, radio, or television programming in native Cameroonian languages. Nevertheless, many Cameroonian languages have alphabets or other writing systems, many developed by the Christian missionary group SIL International, who have translated the Bible, Christian hymns, and other materials. The General Alphabet of Cameroon Languages was developed in the late 1970s as an orthographic system for all Cameroonian languages.

In the late 19th century, the Bamum script was developed by Sultan Ibrahim Njoya to write the Bamum (Shüpamom) language.

== Official languages ==
R.
1
2
-
-
-
-

Literacy in official languages according to the 2005 census (population of age 12 and above)
Language	%	#
French (total)	57.6	6,405,981
English (total)	25.2	2,802,794
French only	46.0	5,112,479
English only	13.6	1,509,292
French and English	11.6	1,293,502
Neither French nor English	28.8	3,199,221
Total	100,00	11,114,495

R.
1
2
-
-
-
-
-

Literacy in official languages according to the 2005 census (population of age 15 and above)
Language	%	#
French (total)	57	5,566,339
English (total)	25	2,448,914
French only	45	4,401,333
English only	13	1,283,908
French and English	12	1,165,006
Neither French nor English	30	2,909,664
Undetermined	1	85,568
Total	100,00	9,845,479

Literacy in French for individuals of age 12 and above rose from 41.3% to 57.6% between 1987 and 2005 while that of English rose from 13.4% to 25.3%. The global proportion of individuals literate in official languages has thus markedly increased between 1987 and 2005, rising from 53.3% to 71.2%.

In 2005, the probability to be literate in French while being anglophone was 0.46 while that of being literate in English while being francophone was 0.20, resulting from the predominant status of the French language in Cameroon as a whole.

== Indigenous languages ==
Most of the 260 languages spoken in Cameroon are indigenous languages. With a population estimated in 25 million people, UNESCO classified the country as a distinctive cultural density. The National Institute of Statistics of Cameroon reported that four percent of the indigenous languages have disappeared since 1950. Currently, ten percent of them are neglected, and seven percent of them are considered as threatened.

=== Ethnologue ===
The following list of languages in Cameroon is mostly based from Ethnologue.

Name	Speakers
Abo	
Afade	
Aghem	26,700
Akoose	100,000
Akum	
Ambele	
Arabic, Chadian	145,000
Atong	4,200
Awing	19,000
Baba	24,500
Babanki	22,500
Bafanji	17,000
Bafaw-balong	8,400
Bafia	60,000
Bafut	105,000
Baka	40,000
Bakaka	30,000
Bakoko	50,000
Bakole	
Bakundu-balue	
Bakweri	
Baldamu	4
Balo	
Balundu-bima	106,000
Bamali	10,800
Bambalang	29,000
Bambili-Bambui	10,000
Bamenyam	4,000
Bamukumbit	12,000
Bamum (Shüpamom)	215,000
Bamunka	31,000
Bana	23,000
Bangandu	
Bangolan	13,500
Bangwa	
Bankon	12,000
Lamnso	
Barombi	3,000
Bassa	230,000
Bassossi	5,000
Bata	
Batanga	6,000
Bati	
Bayangam	
Beba	3,000
Bebe	
Bebele	24,000
Bebil	6,000
Beezen	
Befang	
Bekwel	
Beti	
Bikya	
Bishuo	
Bitare	
Bokyi	
Bomwali	
Bu	
Bubia	
Buduma	
Bulu	858,000
Bum	21,400
Bumbung	
Busam	
Busuu	3
Buwal	7,000
Byep	9,500
Caka	5,000
Cung	
Cuvok	5,000
Daba	24,000
Dama	
Dek	
Denya	11,200
Dii	47,000
Dimbong	
Doyayo	18,000
Duala	87,700
Dugun	7,000
Dugwor	5,000
Duli	
Duupa	5,000
Dzodinka	2,600
Efik	
Ejagham	
Elip	6,400
Eman	
Esimbi	20,000
Eton	52,000
Evand	
Ewondo	578,000
Fali	
Fang	111,000
Fe'fe'	124,000
Fulfulde	12,000,000
Gaduwa	
Gavar	7,000
Gbaya-Mbodomo	20,000
Ghomala	260,000
Gidar	54,000
Gyele	4,250
Gimme	3,000
Gimnime	3,000
Hausa	25,000
Hdi	25,000
Iceve-Maci	7,000
Isu	10,400
Jimi	3,500
Kako	100,000
Karang	17,000
Kemedzung	4,500
Kenswei Nsei	25,000
Kenyang	65,000
Kol	12,000
Kom	233,000
Koonzime	30,000
Kotoko	
Kwasio / Ngumba	9,000
Kwakum	10,000
Kwanja	20,000
Kuk	3,000
La’bi	4,400
Laimbue	5,000
Lefa	10,000
Limbum	73,000
Ncane	15,500
Ngiemboon	250,000
Ngomba	63,000
North Giziga	20,000
North Mofu	27,500
Mafa	136,000
Makaa	80,000
Malgbe	6,000
Mambai	8,000
Mambila	30,000
Manta	5,300
Massa	
Matal	18,000
Mazagway	17,000
Mbedam	6,000
Mbo	45,000
Mbum	38,600
Mbuko	13,000
Medumba	210,000
Mefele	11,000
Mendankwe-Nkwen	23,100
Mengaka	20,000
Mengisa	20,000
Menka	5,200
Merey	10,000
Mesaka	14,000
Metaʼ	87,000
Mfumte	24,700
Mmaala	5,300
Mmen	35,000
Mokpwe	32,200
Mousgoum	
Mouse	
Moghamo	
Mofu-gudur	60,000
Moloko	8,500
Mpade	16,000
Mpongmpong	45,000
Mundang	
Mundani	34,000
Musgu	61,500
Muyang	30,000
Nda'nda'	10,000
Ndemli	5,950
Nga'ka	50,100
Ngamambo	8,000
Ngemba	18,800
Ngie	37,000
Ngombale	45,000
Ngoshie	9,200
Ngwo	22,000
Nomaande	6,000
Noone	25,000
North Fali	16,000
Nso'	125,000
Nugunu	35,000
Nweh	73,200
Nyong	30,000
Oku	40,000
Parkwa	30,000
Peere	15,000
Pinyin	24,600
Pol	38,700
Psikye	40,500
Saari	7,000
Sharwa	5,100
So	9,000
South Fali	20,000
South Giziga	60,000
Suga	10,000
Tikar	25,000
Tigon Mbembe	36,000
Toupouri	125,000
Tunen	35,300
Tuki	26,000
Usaghade	10,000
Vame	8,500
Vengo	27,000
Vute	20,000
Wandala	23,500
Weh	6,900
Wushi	25,000
Wumboko	4,000
Wuzlam	10,500
Yabassi	
Yamba	40,800
Yambeta	3,700
Yemba	300,000
Zulgo-Gemzek	26,000
Mousgoum, Massa, Kotoko, and Mousseye are spoken on the Logone River in the Far North.	
Gyele	
Psikye	

=== ALCAM (2012) ===
The Atlas linguistique du Cameroun (ALCAM, or "Linguistic Atlas of Cameroon") lists about 250 languages in Cameroon. The list is provided below.

Code	Language name	French spelling	Other names	Classification
001	Fulfulde	Fulfulde		Senegambian
002	Kanuri	Kanuri		Saharan
003	Sara	Sara		Central Sudanic
004	Pidgin English	Pidgin-English		creole
005	Arabic	Arabe		Semitic
101	Hausa	Hausa		West Chadic
102	Gedar	Gédar		Central Chadic
103	Munjuk	Munjuk		Central Chadic
104	Yedina	Yedina		Central Chadic
105	Kera	Kera		East Chadic
111	Wandala	Wandala		Central Chadic
112	Gelvaldaxa	Gélvaldaxa		Central Chadic
113	Parekwa	Parékwa		Central Chadic
121	Gevoko	Gévoko		Central Chadic
122	Hdi	Hdi		Central Chadic
123	Mabas	Mabas		Central Chadic
131	Pelasla	Pélasla		Central Chadic
132	Mbuko	Mbuko		Central Chadic
140	Matal	Matal		Central Chadic
151	Wuzlam	Wuzlam		Central Chadic
152	Muyang	Muyang		Central Chadic
153	Mada	Mada		Central Chadic
154	Melokwo	Mélokwo		Central Chadic
161	Zelgwa Minew	Zélgwa Minew		Central Chadic
162	Dugwor	Dugwor		Central Chadic
163	Merey	Merey		Central Chadic
164	Gemzek	Gemzek		Central Chadic
171	Giziga	Giziga		Central Chadic
173	Mofu-Duvangar	Mofu-Duvangar	Mofou-Nord	Central Chadic
174	Mofu-Gudur	Mofu-Gudur	Mofou-Sud	Central Chadic
175	Baldamu	Baldamu		Central Chadic
181	Cuvok	Cuvok		Central Chadic
182	Mefele	Mefele		Central Chadic
183	Mafa	Mafa		Central Chadic
191	Psikya	Psikyá		Central Chadic
192	Hya	Hya		Central Chadic
193	Bana	Bana		Central Chadic
211	Jimjimen	Jimjimén		Central Chadic
212	Gude	Gude		Central Chadic
213	Ziziliveken	Zizilivékén		Central Chadic
214	Sharwa	Sharwa		Central Chadic
215	Tsuvan	Tsuvan		Central Chadic
220	Njanyi	Njanyi		Central Chadic
230	Gbwata	Gbwata		Central Chadic
240	Buwal–Gavar	Buwal–Gavar		Central Chadic
251	Besleri	Besleri		Central Chadic
252	Daba	Daba		Central Chadic
253	Mazagway Hide	Mazagway Hide		Central Chadic
254	Mbedam	Mbédam		Central Chadic
261	Jina	Jina		Central Chadic
262	Majera	Majéra		Central Chadic
271	Lagwan	Lagwan		Central Chadic
272	Mser	Msér		Central Chadic
281	Afade	Afadé		Central Chadic
282	Maslam	Maslam		Central Chadic
283	Malgbe	Malgbe		Central Chadic
284	Mpade	Mpadé		Central Chadic
291	Masa	Masa		Masa
292	Zumaya	Zumaya		Masa
293	Musey	Musey		Masa
294	Zime	Zime		Masa
300	Samba	Samba		Samba
301	Longto	Lóñtó		Vere-Duru
302	Paare	Pááre	Páárá	Vere-Duru
303	Doayo	Doayo	Doyayo	Vere-Duru
304	Tupuri	Tupuri		Mbum
305	Mundang	Mundañ		Mbum
306	Mambay	Mambay		Mbum
307	Dama	Dama		Mbum
308	Mono	Mono		Mbum
309	Baka	Baka		Ubangian
311	Kobo	Kobo		Vere-Duru
312	Koma Ndera	Koma Ndera		Vere-Duru
321	Gimnime	Gímníme		Vere-Duru
322	Kompana	Kompana		Vere-Duru
330	Duupa	Duupa		Vere-Duru
341	Dugun	Dugun		Vere-Duru
342	Dii	Dii		Vere-Duru
343	Kolbila	Kolbila		Vere-Duru
351	Mbum	Mbum		Mbum
352	Karang	Karang		Mbum
353	Pana	Pana		Mbum
354	Kali-Dek	Kali-Dek		Mbum
355	Kuo	Kuo		Mbum
356	Gbata	Gbátá		Mbum
361	Pam	Pam		Mbum
362	Ndai	Ndai		Mbum
371	Fali, Northern	Fali-Nord		Fali
372	Fali, Southern	Fali-Sud		Fali
381	Gbaya	Gbaya		Ubangian
382	Bangandu	Bangandu	Bangando	Adamawa
391	Gey	Gey		Adamawa
392	Duli	Duli		Adamawa
393	Nimbari	Nimbari		Adamawa
394	Oblo	Oblo		Adamawa
395	Mome	Mome		Adamawa
401	Basaa	Basaa		Bantu
402	Bakoko	Bakoko		Bantu
403	Beti–Fang	Béti–Fañ		Bantu
404	Bembele	Bémbélé		Bantu
405	Bebil	Bébil		Bantu
406	Bankon	Bankon	Barombi	Bantu
411	Meka	Méka	Mékaa	Bantu
412	So	Só	Só'	Bantu
413	Bikele	Bikele		Bantu
421	Kwasio	Kwasio		Bantu
422	Bagyali	Bagyáli	Bagyeli	Bantu
431	Mpo	Mpo		Bantu
432	Koozime	Kóózime		Bantu
440	Kako	Kakó		Bantu
462	Polri	Polri		Bantu
463	Kwakum	Kwakum		Bantu
501	Tikari	Tikari	Tikar	Bantu
502	Ndemli	Ndemli		Bantu
511	Tunan	Tunán		Bantu
512	Nomande	Nomande	Nómaande	Bantu
513	Atomp	Atómp		Bantu
514	Ninyo'o	Ninyó'ó		Bantu
520	Nigi	Nigi		Bantu
530	Bati	Bati		Bantu
541	Nugunu	Nugunu		Bantu
542	Nuasua	Nuasuá	Nuaswá	Bantu
543	Nubaca	Nubaca		Bantu
544	Dumbula	Dumbulá		Bantu
550	Tuki	Tuki		Bantu
570	Tebaya	Tébáya		Bantu
581	Lefa'	Léfa'		Bantu
582	Dembong	Démbóñ	Dimbóñ	Bantu
583	Ripay	Rípáy		Bantu
584	Rikpa	Ríkpa'		Bantu
601	Yasa	Yasa		Bantu
602	Batanga	Batanga		Bantu
610	Duala	Duala		Bantu
621	Mokpwe	Mokpwe		Bantu
622	Wumboko	Wumboko		Bantu
623	Bubia	Bubia		Bantu
624	Isu	Isu		Bantu
625	Bakola	Bakólá		Bantu
630	Oroko	Oroko		Bantu
640	Lifo-Balong	Lifó-Baloñ		Bantu
651	Mbo	Mbo		Bantu
652	Akoosa	Akóósá		Bantu
653	Nsosa	Nsósá		Bantu
701	Njukun	Njukun		Jukunoid
702	Kutep	Kutep		Jukunoid
703	Uuhum-Gigi	Uuhum-Gigi		Yukubenic
704	Korop	Korop		Cross River
705	Efik	Efik		Cross River
706	Boki	Boki		Bendi
707	Akum	Akum		Cross River
708	Baazen Nsaa	Báázen Nsaa	Báázán Nsaa	Yukubenic
709	Mbembe	Mbembe		Cross River
710	Mambila	Mambila		Mambiloid
720	Vute	Vúte		Mambiloid
730	Nizaa	Nizåå		Mambiloid
741	Kwanja	Kwanja		Mambiloid
742	Bung	Buñ		Mambiloid
743	Kamkam	Kamkam		Mambiloid
750	Njoyama	Njóyamá	Njoyame	Mambiloid
760	Twendi	Twendi		Mambiloid
780	Njanga	Njanga		Mambiloid
791	Yeni	Yeni		Mambiloid
792	Kasabe	Kasabe		Mambiloid
793	Luo	Luo		Mambiloid
801	Njwanda	Njwandá	Njwande	Tivoid
802	Tiv	Tiv		Tivoid
803	Esimbi	Esimbi		Tivoid
804	Amasi	Amasi	Manta	Tivoid
805	Njen	Njen		Momo
806	Mbonga	Mbóña		Jarawan
807	Ngong-Nagumi	Ngoñ-Nagumi		Jarawan
808	Ejagham	Ejagham		Jarawan
810	Aghem	Aghem		Ekoid
821	Mman	Mmán		Ring
822	Itangikom	Itangikom	Kom	Ring
823	Bum	Bum		Ring
824	Babanki	Babanki		Ring
825	Ebkuo	Ebkuo	Ébkuó	Ring
830	Lamnso'	Lamnsó'		Ring
841	Kenswei Nsei	Kénswei Nsei		Ring
842	Niemeng	Niemeng		Ring
843	Vengo	Véño		Ring
844	Wushi	Wushi		Ring
851	Befang	Befang		Menchum
852	Modele	Modele		Menchum
861	Ngwo	Ngwó		Momo
862	Basa	Basa		Momo
863	Konda	Konda		Momo
864	Widikum	Widikum		Momo
865	Menka	Menka		Momo
866	Ambele	Ambele		Momo
867	Mundani	Mundani		Momo
868	Ngamambo	Ngamambo		Momo
869	Busam	Busam		Momo
871	Bebe	Bebe		East Beboid
872	Kemezung	Kémézuñ		East Beboid
873	Ncane	Ncane		East Beboid
874	Nsari	Nsari		East Beboid
875	Noone	Nóóné		East Beboid
876	Naki	Naki		West Beboid
877	Bu	Bu		West Beboid
878	Missong	Missong		West Beboid
879	Koshin	Koshin		West Beboid
881	Kenyang	Kenyang		Nyang
882	Denya	Denya		Nyang
883	Kendem	Kendem		Nyang
885	Mungong	Muñgóñ		West Beboid
886	Cung	Cuñ		West Beboid
887	Busuu	Busuu		West Beboid
888	Bishuo	Bishuó		West Beboid
889	Bikya	Bikya		West Beboid
891	Ugare	Ugaré		Tivoid
892	Batomo	Batomo		Tivoid
893	Caka	Caka		Tivoid
894	Iyive	Iyive		Tivoid
895	Iceve	Iceve		Tivoid
896	Evand	Evand		Tivoid
897	Asumbo	Asumbo		Tivoid
898	Eman	Eman		Tivoid
899	Ihatum	Ihatum		Tivoid
901	Kwa'	Kwa'	Kwa	Eastern Grassfields
902	Mengambo	Méñgambo		Eastern Grassfields
903	Limbum	Limbum		Eastern Grassfields
904	Dzodinka	Dzodinka		Eastern Grassfields
905	Nda'nda'	Nda'nda'		Eastern Grassfields
906	Yamba	Yamba		Eastern Grassfields
907	Mbe'	Mbé'		Eastern Grassfields
911	Mundum	Mundum		Eastern Grassfields
912	Bafut	Bafut		Eastern Grassfields
913	Mankon	Mankon		Eastern Grassfields
914	Bambili	Bambili		Eastern Grassfields
915	Nkwan-Mendankwe	Nkwán-Mendankwe	Nkwen-Mendankwe	Eastern Grassfields
916	Pinyin	Pinyin		Eastern Grassfields
917	Awing	Awing		Eastern Grassfields
920	Ngombale	Ngombale		Eastern Grassfields
930	Megaka	Mégaka		Eastern Grassfields
940	Ngomba	Ngomba		Eastern Grassfields
951	Ngyamboong	Ngyámbóóñ		Eastern Grassfields
952	Yemba	Yemba		Eastern Grassfields
953	Ngwe	Ñwe		Eastern Grassfields
960	Ghomala'	Ghómala'		Eastern Grassfields
970	Fe'fe'	Fe'fe'		Eastern Grassfields
980	Mfumte	Mfumte		Eastern Grassfields
991	Shüpamom	Shüpamom	Shü Pamém	Eastern Grassfields
992	Bangolan	Bangolan		Eastern Grassfields
993	Mboyakum	Mboyakum	Cirambo	Eastern Grassfields
994	Ngoobechop	Ngoobechop	Bamali	Eastern Grassfields
995	Chuufi	Chuufi	Bafanji	Eastern Grassfields
996	Mungaka	Mungaka		Eastern Grassfields
997	Medumba	Médúmba		Eastern Grassfields

== Classification ==
The 2012 edition of the Atlas linguistique du Cameroun (ALCAM) provides the following classification of the Niger–Congo languages of Cameroon.

Adamawa

- Samba
- Daka
- Kobo-Dii (Vere-Duru)
  - North: Doyayo, Longto
  - South: Peere
- Mumuye
- Mbum
  - North: Tupuri, Mundang, Mambay
  - South: Mbum, Pana, Kali-Dek, Kuo, Gbete, Pam, Ndai
- Fali: North, South
- Nimbari

Ubangian

- Gbaya; Bangando
- Baka

Benue-Congo

- Jukunoid: Mbembe, Njukun, Kutep, Uuhum-Gigi, Busua, Bishuo, Bikya, Kum, Beezen Nsaa
- Cross River: Korop; Efik
- Bendi: Boki
- Bantoid (see below)

Bantoid

- Mambiloid: Njoyame, Nizaa, Mambila, Kwanja, Bung, Kamkam, Vute
- Tivoid: Njwande, Tiv, Iyive, Iceve, Evand, Ugare, Esimbi, Batomo, Assumbo, Eman, Caka, Ihatum, Amasi
- Ekoid: Ejagham
- Nyang: Denya, Kendem, Kenyang
- Beboid
  - Western: Naki, Bu, Misong, Koshin, Muŋgɔŋ, Cuŋ
  - Eastern: Bebe, Kemezuŋ, Ncane, Nsari, Noone, Busuu, Bishuo, Bikya
- Grassfield (see below)
- Bantu (see below)

Grassfield

- Western
  - Momo
    - Ngwɔ, Widikum
  - Menchum
    - Modele, Befang
  - Ring
    - West: Aghem
    - Central: Mmen
    - East: Lamnso'
    - South: Kənswei Nsei, Niemeng, Vəŋo, Wushi
- Eastern
  - Ngemba: Bafut, Mundum, Mankon, Bambili, Nkwen, Pinyin
  - Bamileke-Central: Ngomable, New; Kwa', Ghomala', Fe'fe', Nda'nda'
  - Noun: Mamenyan, Shüpamem, Bangolan, Cirambo, Bamali, Bafanji, Mungaka, Medumba
  - Northern: Limbum, Dzodinka, Yamba, Mbe', Central Mfumte, Southern Mfumte

Bantu

- Jarawan: Ngoŋ-Nagumi, Mboŋa
- Mbam (see below)
- Equatorial: A, B, C, D (partial) (see below)
- Zambeze: D (partial), E, F, G, H, I, J, K, L, M, N, P, R, S

Mbam

- ex-A40b
  - Ndemli, Tikari
  - Ninyoo, Tunan, Nomande, Atomp
  - Nigi
  - Bati
- ex-A60
  - Yambasa: Nugunu, Nuasua, Nubaca, Dumbula
  - Sanaga: Tuki

Equatorial Bantu

- North
  - A
    - Bafia (A50): Təbɛya, Lefa', Dimboŋ, Ripɛy, Rikpa
  - B
    - Coastal
      - A10: Oroko (West, East dialects), Lifɔ'-Balɔŋ, Nsose, Akoose
      - A20: Bakɔlɛ, Wumbuko, Mokpwe, Isu, Bubia; Duala
      - A30: Yasa, Batanga
    - Basaa (A40): Bankon, Basaa, Bakoko
    - Beti (A70): Bəti-Faŋ, Bəmbələ, Bəbil
    - Meka (A80): Məkaa, Sɔ, Bikele, Kwasio, Bagyɛli, Kɔɔzime, Mpo
    - Kakɔ (A90): Polri, Kwakum, Kakɔ
- South: B, C, D (partial)

== See also ==
- Demographics of Cameroon
- General Alphabet of Cameroon Languages
- Francophone Africa
- Cameroonian Pidgin English

== Sources ==
- DeLancey, Mark W.; DeLancey, Mark Dike (2000). Historical Dictionary of the Republic of Cameroon. African Historical Dictionaries. Vol. 81 (3rd ed.). Lanham, Maryland: The Scarecrow Press. ISBN 0-8108-3775-7. OCLC 43324271.
- Neba, Aaron (1999). Modern Geography of the Republic of Cameroon (3rd ed.). Bamenda: Neba Publishers.
- Tanang, Patrice; Mimche, Honoré; Efon, Hervé (2014). "Dynamique des langues nationales et officielles au Cameroun de 1987 à 2005". Actes du XVIIe colloque international de l'AIDELF, Ouagadougou, novembre 2012 (PDF) (in French). ISBN 978-2-9521220-4-7.
