= Limbum language =

Eastern Grassfields language of Cameroon

Limbum
- Limbum
- Region: Cameroon
- Native speakers: 130,000 (2005)
- Language family: Niger–Congo?: Atlantic–Congo; Benue–Congo; Southern Bantoid; Grassfields; Eastern; Nkambe; Limbum

Language codes
- ISO 639-3: lmp
- Glottolog: limb1268

- People: Wimbum
- Language: Limbum

Limbum is a Grassfields language of Cameroon, with a small number of speakers in Nigeria. It is used as a trade language by some, but is primarily the mother tongue of the Wimbum people, who live in Donga-Mantung division of the Northwest Region, at the top of the Ring Road.

== Speakers ==
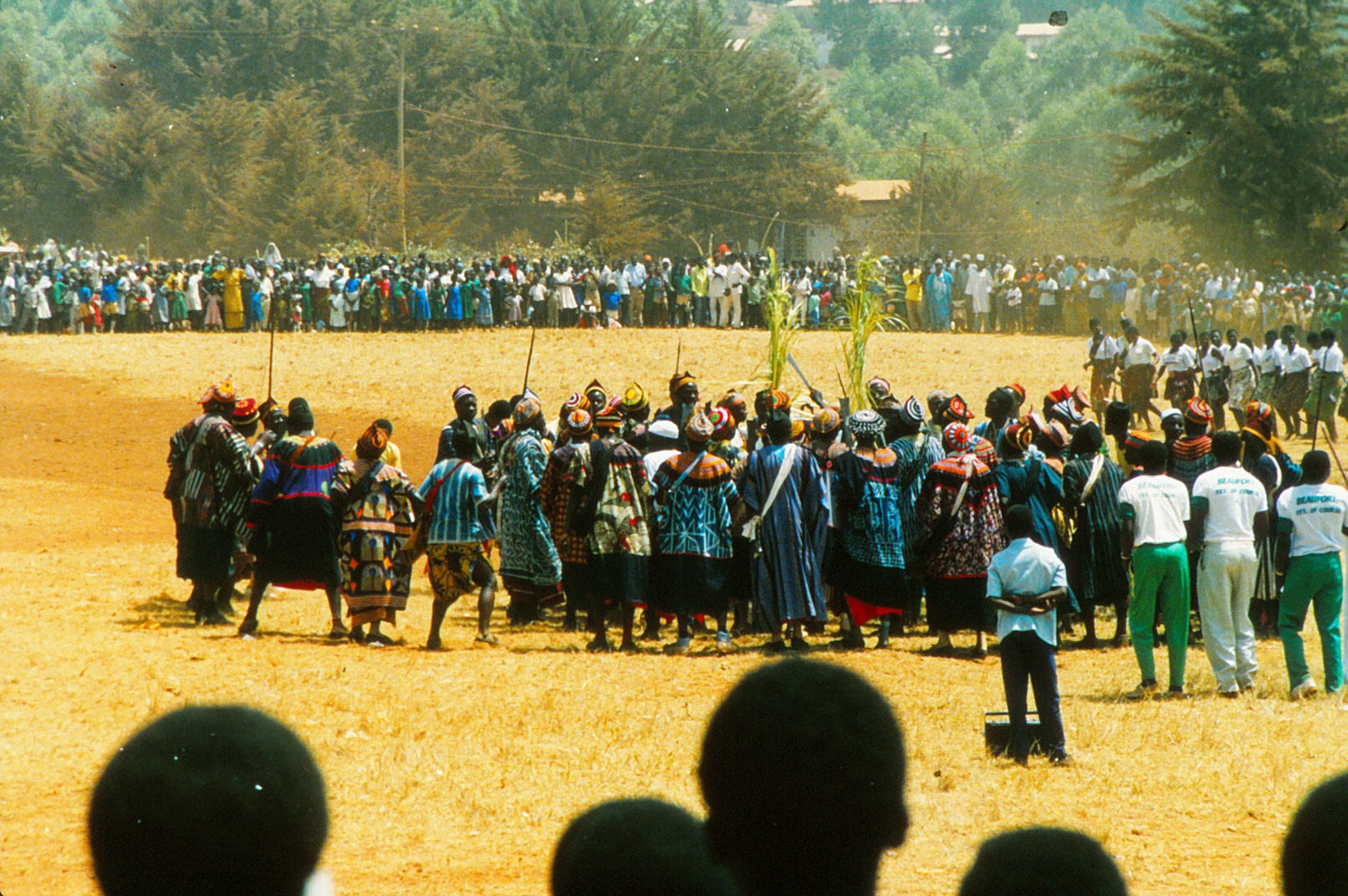
Traditional dance of Wimbum, around 1990 in dry season Nkambe-town

The Wimbum consist of three clans: War clan headquartered at Mbot, Tang clan at Tallah, and Wiya clan at Ndu. Scattered around the area are other Wimbum villages, each associated with one of the three clans. Each village has a chief, also known as fon, who is largely autonomous, and beneath him sub-chiefs or quarter-heads. The three clans are geographically interspersed, sharing the language. The people live on the Nkambe Plateau, a dramatic grassy highland cut by wooded ravines, about a mile above sea level. Most are farmers, growing maize, beans, potatoes, yams, vegetable, tomatoes, bananas, and also plantains and coffee in lower, warmer areas. Some conduct trade, primarily in the towns of Nkambé and Ndu. Some work for the government, primarily in Nkambe.

Some linguists consider Limbum to have three dialects: a northern, a middle, and a southern dialect. Speakers of one dialect can generally understand speakers of any other. The three dialects cut across the three clans, and may result from influence of the neighboring languages to the north and south. Limbum is closely related to some neighboring languages like Yamba and more geographically distant ones like Bamum, Ngemba and Bamileke. It is quite different from some other neighboring languages like Bebe and Noni.

== Grammar ==
Limbum's grammar is similar to English in some ways, including:

- Word order is subject–verb–object. For example, consider:
  - Ŋgwa Ta᷅ta a᷅ byɛ᷅' kwaa᷅. (normal Limbum word order)
  - Wife Tata has carried corn. (word-for-word English translation, retaining Limbum word order)
  - Tata's wife has carried corn. (translation with conventional English word order)
- Verb tenses tend to be formed with auxiliary verbs like "a᷅" in the example above.
- Open questions may be formed with interrogative determiners; e.g. "A nda?" means "It-is who?" word-for-word.

But Limbum differs from English in other ways. Here are a few:

- Limbum is a tone language, meaning that spoken pitch can distinguish words which otherwise sound the same. For example, the sound "baa" spoken with different tones can mean father, fufu, two, bag, part in hair, or madness.
- The pronoun system is quite different. For example, "ye" is a gender-neutral third person singular, taking the place of he and she in English. In second person, "wɛ᷅" means you(singular), "we᷅e" means you(plural) and not I, "so᷅" means you(singular) and I, and "se᷅e" means (you(singular) and we) or (you(plural) and I). Also, Limbum has compound pronouns, which English lacks.
- Adjectives tend to follow the noun they modify, and may be repeated for emphasis. E.g. "e ye bi boŋ" means "he-or-she eats kolanut good," and "e ye bi boŋboŋ" means "he-or-she eats kolanut very-good".
- Yes–no questions are formed simply by appending the word a to a statement, as in "Ndi a᷅ du a?", meaning "Ndi has gone, is-it-so?" word-for-word - much less confusing than English's subject-verb inversions. Negation is grammatically similar.
- Limbum's five prepositions don't align with English prepositions much at all:
  - ni: marker of direction, accompaniment or instrument, like "to him" or "with him" in English.
  - mbe: marker of location, like "in the house" or "on the chair."
  - mba: marker of a direction or location at a lower elevation, like "down-to Tabenken valley."
  - ko: marker of a direction or location at a higher elevation, like "up-to Ndu."
  - nje: marker of direction, location or provenance, like "at school" or "from Douala."

== Phonology ==
=== Consonants ===
		Labial			Alveolar		Post-alv./ Palatal		Velar			Labial- velar	Glottal
		plain	lab.	pal.	plain	lab.	plain	lab.	plain	lab.	pal.	Labial- velar	Glottal
Nasal		m	mʷ	mʲ	n		ɲ		ŋ	ŋʷ			
Plosive	voiceless	p			t	tʷ			k	kʷ	kʲ	k͡p	ʔ
Plosive	voiced	b	bʷ	bʲ	d				ɡ	ɡʷ		ɡ͡b	
Plosive	prenasal vd.	ᵐb			ⁿd				ᵑɡ			ᵑᵐɡ͡b	
Plosive	prenasal vl.				ⁿt				ᵑk				
Affricate	voiceless				(t͡s)		t͡ʃ	t͡ʃʷ					
Affricate	voiced				(d͡z)		d͡ʒ						
Affricate	prenasal						ᶮd͡ʒ						
Fricative	voiceless	f	fʷ	fʲ	s		ʃ	ʃʷ					h
Fricative	voiced	v			(z)		ʒ		ɣ				
Fricative	prenasal vl.	ᶬf			ⁿs		ᶮʃ						
Fricative	prenasal vd.						ᶮʒ						
Trill					r								
Approximant					l		j			w			

- Sounds /t͡s, d͡z, z/ are mainly heard in the Southern Limbum dialect.
- /m/ may also occur as syllabic [m̩] in different pre-consonantal positions.

=== Vowels ===
	Front	Central	Back
Close	i iː	ɨ ɨː	u uː
Close-mid	e eː		o oː
Open-mid	ɛ ɛː		ɔ ɔː
Open		a aː	

- A short /u/ may also be heard as [ʊ].

== Sample vocabulary ==
ŋwɛ᷅ - person	fa - give	ŋgʉp - fowl	boŋ - good
njeŋwɛ᷅ - woman	ye - eat	nyaa - meat	boŋboŋ - very good
muu - child	laa᷅ - say	kwaa᷅ - corn	bɛbɛp - bad
ŋkar - friend	fa᷅' - work	nda᷅p - house	baa - two
ma - mother	ko᷅ŋ - like or love	tap - hut	taar - three
ta - father	yɛ - see	afyoŋ - airplane	tâ - five
e - he or she	saŋ - write	ŋwa᷅' - letter	
