= Fanji language =

Grassfields language spoken in Cameroon

Fanji
- Bafanji
- Chuufieʼ
- Region: Cameroon
- Ethnicity: Bafanji
- Native speakers: 17,000 (2008)
- Language family: Niger–Congo?: Atlantic–Congo; Volta-Congo; Benue–Congo; Bantoid; Southern Bantoid; Grassfields; Eastern Grassfields; Mbam-Nkam; Nun; Fanji

Language codes
- ISO 639-3: bfj
- Glottolog: bafa1249

The Fanji language, Chuufiè (chufieʼ), is a Grassfields Bantu language and the language of the Bafanji people in the Northwest Region of Cameroon. There are approximately 17,000 speakers. The language has a rich system of tonal morphology, including reduplication involving adjectives.

Bafanji speakers, who number 8,500, call their language Chuufi. It is spoken south of Ndop in Ngoketunjia Department, Northwest Region. It is closely related to Bamali, Mengambo, and Bambalang.

== Phonology ==
=== Consonants ===
		Labial	Alveolar	Post- alveolar	Palatal	Velar
Nasal		m	n		ɲ	ŋ
Plosive	Plain	p	t	t͡ʃ	c͡ç	k
Plosive	Aspirated	pʰ	tʰ	t͡ʃʰ	c͡çʰ	kʰ
Plosive	Prenasalised (Note: The prenasalised stops may also be considered voiced with redundant prenasalisation.)	ᵐb	ⁿd	ⁿd͡ʒ	ᶮɟ	ᵑɡ
Fricative	Voiceless	f	s	ʃ	ç	
Fricative	Voiced		z			ɣ
Approximant	Median				j	w
Approximant	Lateral		l		ʎ	
