= Kpati language =

Extinct Grassfields language of Nigeria

Kpati
- Region: Taraba State, Nigeria
- Extinct: 1980s
- Language family: Niger–Congo?: Atlantic–Congo; Volta-Congo; Benue–Congo; Bantoid; Southern Bantoid; Grassfields; Eastern Grassfields; Mbam-Nkam; Ngemba; Kpati

Language codes
- ISO 639-3: koc
- Glottolog: kpat1246

Kpati is an extinct Grassfields language formerly spoken in the Wukari and Takum LGAs of Taraba State, Nigeria. It was first reported as extinct by Grimes, Barbara (1984). Kpati was classified as a Ngemba language by Fivas – Scott (1977).
