= Nkambe languages =

Language family in Cameroon

Nkambe
- Geographic distribution: Grasslands of western Cameroon
- Linguistic classification: Niger–Congo?: Atlantic–Congo; Volta-Congo; Benue–Congo; Bantoid; Southern Bantoid; Grassfields; Eastern Grassfields; Nkambe

Language codes
- Glottolog: nkam1238

The Nkambe languages are a group of Eastern Grassfields languages spoken by the Yamba and related peoples of the Western High Plateau of Cameroon.

The languages are Dzodinka, Kwaja, Limbum, Mbəʼ, Ndaktup, Mfumte, Yamba.
