= Feʼfeʼ language =

Grassfields language spoken in Cameroon

Feʼfeʼ
- Nufi, Fotouni, Bafang
- Ghə̀ǝ̄ fèʼéfěʼè
- Native to: Cameroon
- Region: Haut-Nkam (Upper Nkam)
- Ethnicity: Bamileke Feʼefeʼe
- Native speakers: c. 140,000 (2005)
- Language family: Niger–Congo?: Atlantic–Congo; Volta-Congo; Benue–Congo; Bantoid; Southern Bantoid; Grassfields; Eastern Grassfields; Mbam-Nkam; Bamileke; Feʼfeʼ
- Writing system: Latin

Language codes
- ISO 639-3: fmp
- Glottolog: fefe1239

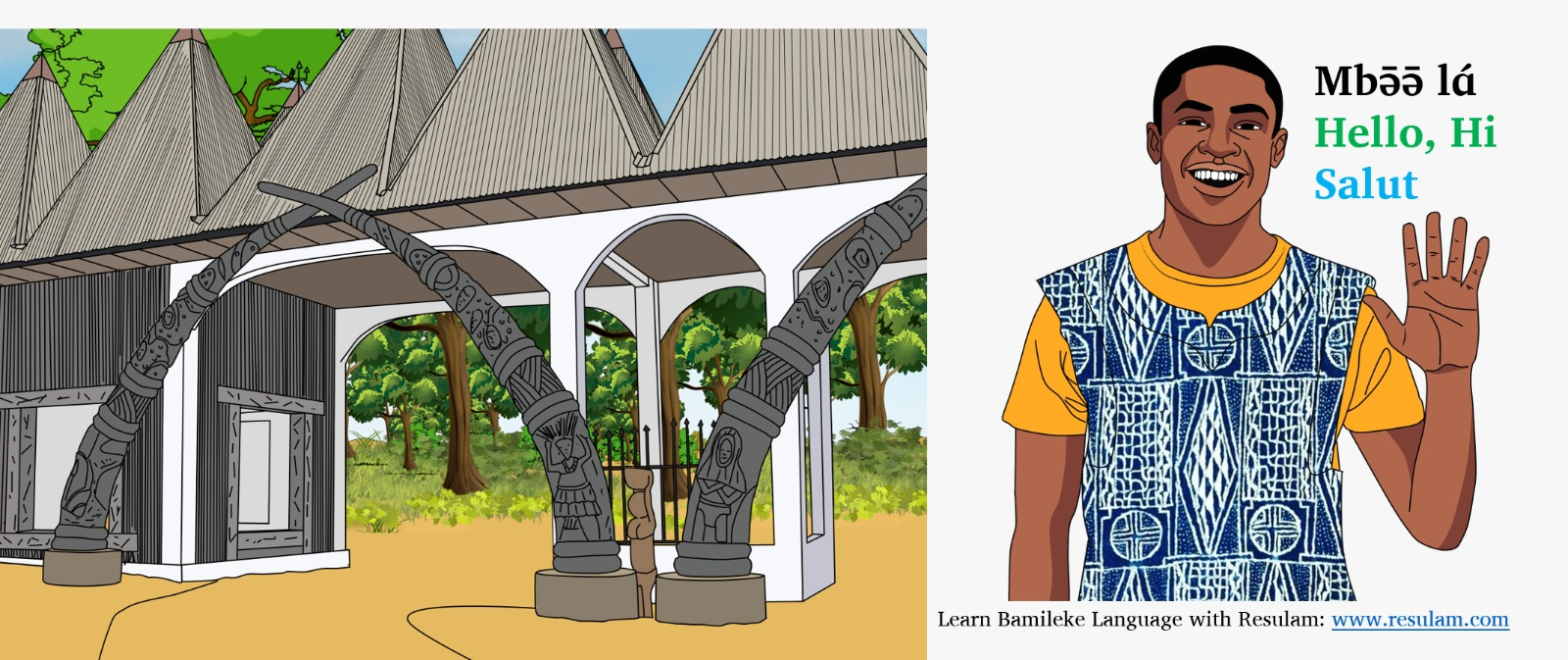
Communication in fe’efe’e translated to English and French

Feʼfeʼ or commonly Feʼefeʼe, also known as Nufi or Bafang (Fe'fe': Nufi), is a Bamileke language spoken in Cameroon, around the town of Bafang. It was one of the four languages selected for option at the Collège Libermann at Douala (along with Duala, Basaa and Ghɔmálá').

== Phonology ==
=== Consonants ===
Allophones are given in brackets.

Consonants
		Labial	Dental	Palatal	Velar	Glottal
Nasal		m	n	(ɲ)	ŋ	
Plosive	voiceless	(p)	t	t͡ʃ	k	ʔ
Plosive	voiced	b	d	d͡ʒ	ɡ	
Fricative	voiceless	f	s	(ʃ)	x	
Fricative	voiced	v	z	(ʒ)	(ɣ)	
Approximant		(w)	(l)	(j)		

=== Vowels ===
Vowels
	Front	Mid	Back
High	i	ɨ (Note: Hyman (1972) uses /ɯ/, represented by ⟨ʉ⟩.)	u
Mid	e	(ə) (Note: Hyman (1972) uses /ɤ/.)	o
Mid	(ɛ)	(ə)	(ɔ)
Low	a		ɑ

=== Tone ===
Tone	Low	Raised-Low	Mid	High
Diacritic	à	ẚ	a	á
Example	[pʉà]	[pʉẚ]	[pʉa]	[pʉá]
Translation	bag	to bend over	to go crazy	two (2)

The language has a complex tone system, carefully described, along with other aspects of the phonology and morphology, in Hyman (1972).

== Writing system ==
Feʼfeʼ alphabet
Uppercase	A	Ɑ	B	C	D	E	Ə	F	G	Gh	H	I	J	K	L	M	N	Ŋ	O	P	S	Sh	T	U	Ʉ	V	W	Y	Z	Zh	ʼ
Lowercase	a	ɑ	b	c	d	e	ə	f	g	gh	h	i	j	k	l	m	n	ŋ	o	p	s	sh	t	u	ʉ	v	w	y	z	zh	ʼ
IPA	a	ɑ	b	t͡ʃ	d	e, ɛ	ə	f	g	ɣ	x	i	d͡ʒ	k	l	m	n	ŋ	o, ɔ	p	s	ʃ	t	u	ɨ	v	w	j	z	ʒ	ʔ
