= Ndzerem language =

Grassfields Bantu language of Cameroon

Ndzerem
- Native to: Cameroon
- Region: Mbokam
- Native speakers: < 1,000
- Language family: Niger–Congo?: Atlantic–Congo; Volta-Congo; Benue–Congo; Bantoid; Southern Bantoid; Grassfields; Eastern Grassfields; Mbam-Nkam; Nun; Ndzerem

Language codes
- ISO 639-3: None (mis)
- Glottolog: ndze1235

Ndzerem is a Grassfields Bantu language spoken in Cameroon.
