= Momo languages =

Language family

Momo
- Geographic distribution: Cameroon
- Linguistic classification: Niger–Congo?: Atlantic–Congo; Volta–Congo; Benue–Congo; Bantoid; Southern Bantoid; Grassfields; Eastern Grassfields; Momo

Language codes
- Glottolog: momo1242
- The Momo languages shown within Cameroon

The Momo languages are a group of Grassfields languages spoken in the Western High Plateau of Cameroon.

The languages are:

Metaʼ (Moghamo)–Ngamambo, Mundani, Ngie (Mengum), Ngoshie, Ngwo (Basa, Konda), Njen, Amasi

Ethnologue 16 adds Menka, but that is a Southwest Grassfields (West Momo) language.

Blench (2010) notes there is little evidence that Momo belongs among the Grassfields languages as it has been traditionally classified. (The erstwhile West Momo languages are clearly in the Grassfields family.) Momo may actually be closer to the poorly established Tivoid group, though that may be an effect of contact.

== See also ==
- Momo word lists (Wiktionary)
