= Mbili-Mbui language =

Grassfields dialects spoken in Cameroon

Mbili-Mbui
- Native to: Cameroon
- Native speakers: (10,000 cited 1983)
- Language family: Niger–Congo?: Atlantic–Congo; Volta-Congo; Benue–Congo; Bantoid; Southern Bantoid; Grassfields; Eastern Grassfields; Mbam-Nkam; Ngemba; Mbili-Mbui

Language codes
- ISO 639-3: baw
- Glottolog: bamb1266

Mbili (Bambili) and Mbui (Bambui) are dialects of a Grassfields Bantu language spoken in Cameroon.
