= Ngombale language =

Grassfield language of Cameroon

Ngombale
- Region: Cameroon
- Ethnicity: Bamileke
- Native speakers: 53,500 (2005)
- Language family: Niger–Congo?: Atlantic–Congo; Volta-Congo; Benue–Congo; Bantoid; Southern Bantoid; Grassfields; Eastern Grassfields; Mbam-Nkam; Bamileke; Ngombale

Language codes
- ISO 639-3: nla
- Glottolog: ngom1271

Ngombale, or Ngombale Bamileke, is a Bamileke language of Cameroon.
