= Beba language =

Grassfields Bantu language of Cameroon

Beba’
- Native to: Cameroon
- Native speakers: 3,000 (2002)
- Language family: Niger–Congo?: Atlantic–Congo; Volta-Congo; Benue–Congo; Bantoid; Southern Bantoid; Grassfields; Eastern Grassfields; Mbam-Nkam; Ngemba; Beba’

Language codes
- ISO 639-3: bfp
- Glottolog: beba1238

Beba’ (Bebadji, Mubadji) is a Grassfields Bantu language spoken in Cameroon.
