= Gawar =

Gawar may refer to:

- Yüksekova, known in Syriac as Gawar, a city in Turkey
- Gawar language, and Afro-Asiatic language of Cameroon

== See also ==
- Gavar, a town in Armenia
- Gaur (disambiguation)
- Gawar-Bati language, an Indo-Aryan language of Pakistan
