= Mbəʼ language =

Grassfields language spoken in Cameroon

Mbəʼ
- Region: Cameroon
- Native speakers: (1,500 cited 2000)
- Language family: Niger–Congo?: Atlantic–Congo; Benue–Congo; Southern Bantoid; Grassfields; Eastern; Nkambe; Mbəʼ

Language codes
- ISO 639-3: mtk
- Glottolog: mbee1250

Mbəʼ (Mboʼ, Mbaw) is a Grassfields language of Cameroon.
