= Viti language =

Grassfields language of Nigeria

Viti
- Native to: Nigeria
- Region: Taraba State
- Language family: Niger–Congo?: Atlantic–Congo; Volta-Congo; Benue–Congo; Bantoid; Southern Bantoid; Grassfields; Eastern Grassfields; (unclassified); Viti

Language codes
- ISO 639-3: Either: vit – Viti ned – Nde-Gbite
- Glottolog: viti1241 Viti ndeg1238 Nde-Gbite

Viti (Biti) or Vötö (Bötö), also known as Nde-Gbite, is a Narrow Grassfields language of Nigeria, spoken in the village of Antere in Taraba State, half a kilometre from the Cameroonian border. It is not clear how close or distinct it is from other Grassfields varieties.
