= Dume language =

Dume language may refer to:

- a variety of the Tsamai language of Ethiopia
- a dialect of the Vame language of Cameroon
