= NJJ =

NJJ or njj may refer to:

- New Jersey Junction Railroad, a defunct railroad in New Jersey, United States
- NJJ Holding, French holding company
- njj, the ISO 639-3 code for Njen language, Cameroon
