= Mendankwe-Nkwen language =

Grassfields Bantu language of Cameroon

Mendankwe-Nkwen
- Native to: Cameroon
- Native speakers: 28,000 (2005)
- Language family: Niger–Congo?: Atlantic–Congo; Volta-Congo; Benue–Congo; Bantoid; Southern Bantoid; Grassfields; Eastern Grassfields; Mbam-Nkam; Ngemba; Mendankwe-Nkwen

Language codes
- ISO 639-3: mfd
- Glottolog: mend1261

Mendankwe and Nkwen are distinct dialects of a Grassfields language spoken in Cameroon.

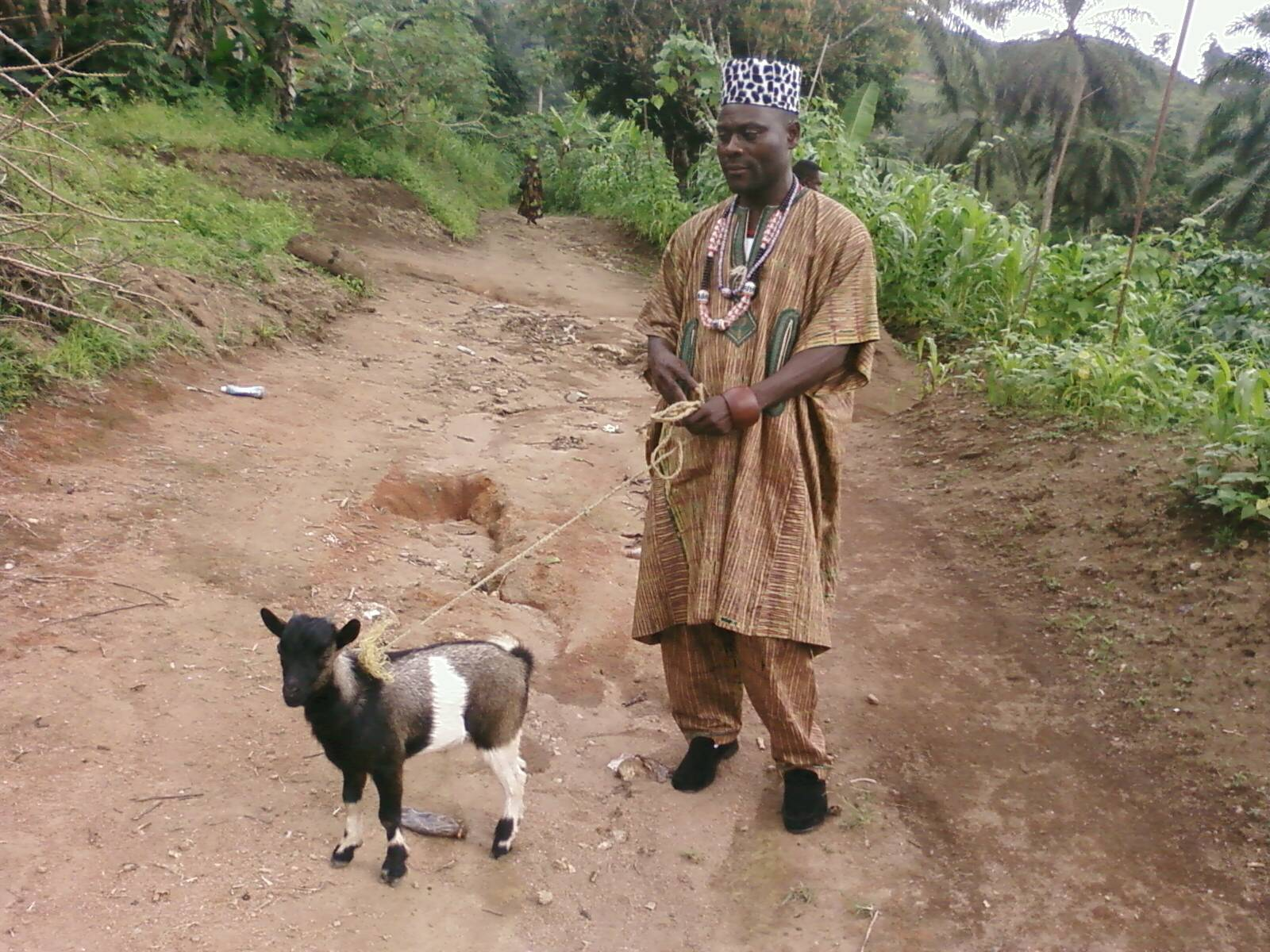
Traditional clothing called Togho

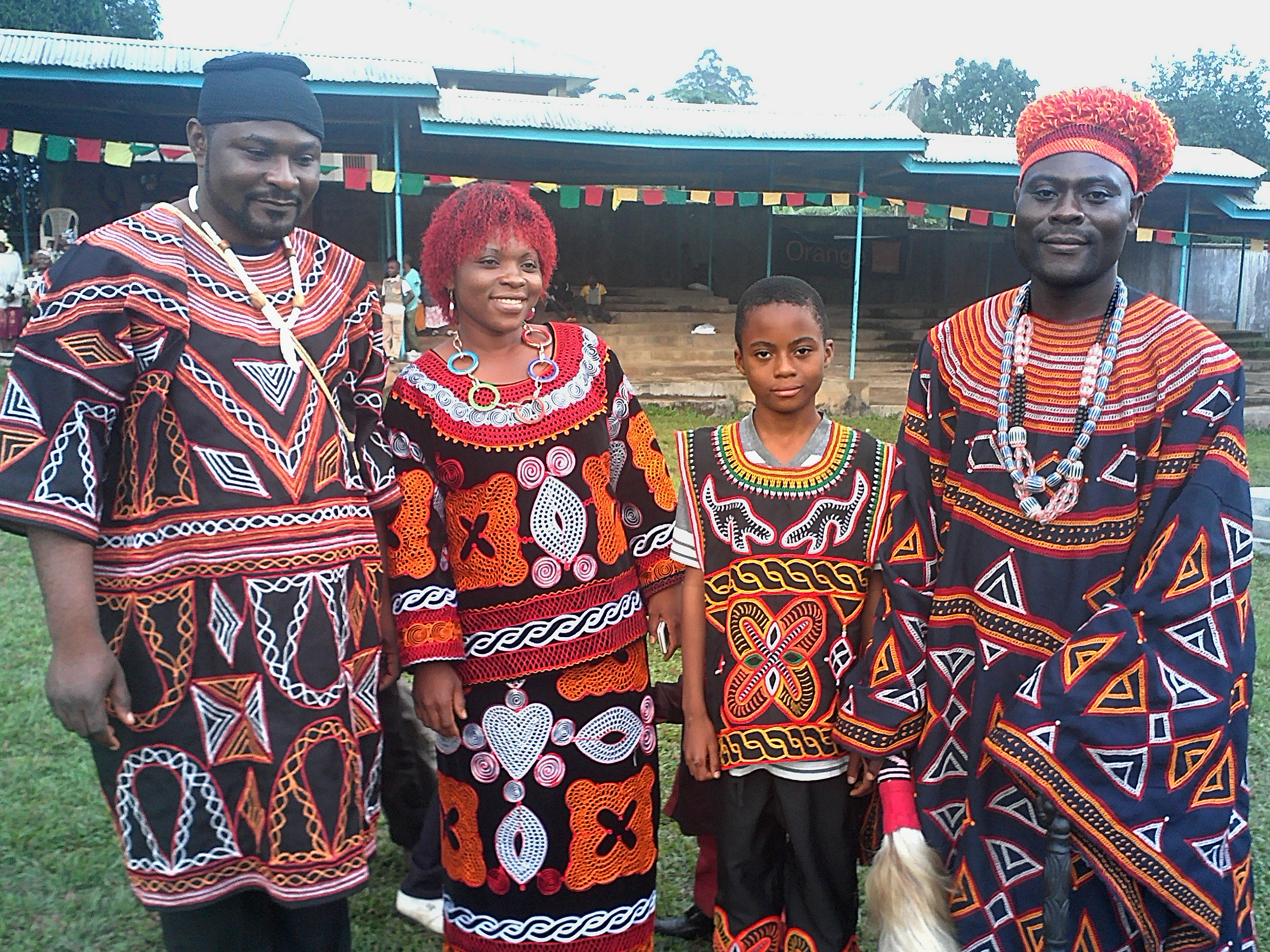
Another Togho
