= Ndaʼndaʼ language =

Bamileke language of Cameroon

Ndaʼndaʼ
- Region: Cameroon
- Ethnicity: Bamileke
- Native speakers: (10,000 cited 1990)
- Language family: Niger–Congo?: Atlantic–Congo; Volta-Congo; Benue–Congo; Bantoid; Southern Bantoid; Grassfields; Eastern Grassfields; Mbam-Nkam; Bamileke; Ndaʼndaʼ

Language codes
- ISO 639-3: nnz
- Glottolog: ndan1241
- ELP: Nda'nda'

Ndaʼndaʼ is a Bamileke language of Cameroon. Dialects are Ungameha (West: shingu, Batchingou) and Undimeha (East: gwa, Bangwa); Batoufam is a subdialect of the latter. It is also spoken in Batcha (a small Bamileke village near Bana).
