= Bnz =

Bnz, BNZ, bnz or variant, may refer to:

- Bank of New Zealand
- Aon Centre (Wellington), formerly BNZ Centre
- Beezen language (ISO 639 language code: bnz)
- Bonza, ICAO code for Australian airline
- Barneveld Zuid railway station (railway code: Bnz)
