= NMJ =

NMJ or nmj may refer to:

- Neuromuscular junction, a chemical synapse between a motor neuron and a muscle fiber
- NMJ, the station code for Nidamangalam Junction railway station, Tamil Nadu, India
- nmj, the ISO 639-3 code for Nombe language, Cameroon
