= Sari language =

Sari language may refer to:

- Sari language (Adamawa) or Dugun, a Dii language spoken in Cameroon
- Sari language (Uruguay) or Chaná, an extinct Charruan language that was once spoken in Uruguay
- Saari language, an Eastern Beboid language of Cameroon
- A dialect of Enga language, a language of the East New Guinea Highlands
