= Pinyin language =

Grassfields language of Cameroon

Pinyin
- Region: Northwest Region, Cameroon
- Native speakers: 25,000 (2001)
- Language family: Niger–Congo?: Atlantic–Congo; Volta-Congo; Benue–Congo; Bantoid; Southern Bantoid; Grassfields; Eastern Grassfields; Mbam-Nkam; Ngemba; Pinyin

Language codes
- ISO 639-3: pny
- Glottolog: piny1238

Pinyin is a Grassfields language spoken by some 27,000 people in the Northwest Region of Cameroon.

== Phonology ==
=== Consonants ===
Consonants
Phoneme	Allophones	Environment	Orthography
p	p		⟨p⟩
p	pʰ	Before /u/ in an open syllable.	⟨p⟩
p	b	After /ɴ̩/.	⟨b⟩
p	β	Between vowels within a root.	⟨b⟩
t	t		⟨t⟩
k	k	Beginning of words and of roots within words, and after /ɴ̩/.	⟨k⟩
k	ʔ	Only C found at ends of words.	⟨’⟩
kʷ	kʷ		⟨kw⟩
l	l	In roots.	⟨l⟩
l	ɾ	In suffixes.	⟨r⟩
l	d	After /ɴ̩/.	⟨d⟩
ɣ	ɣ		⟨ɡh⟩
ɣ	ɡ	After /ɴ̩/.	⟨ɡ⟩
ɣʷ	ɡʷ	After /ɴ̩/.	⟨ɡw⟩
f	f		⟨f⟩
s	s	/ts/ after /ɴ̩/.	⟨s⟩
ts	ts	/ts/ after /ɴ̩/.	⟨ts⟩
z	z		⟨z⟩
z	dz	After /ɴ̩/.	⟨z⟩
ʃ	ʃ	/tʃ/ after /ɴ̩/.	⟨sh⟩
tʃ	tʃ	/tʃ/ after /ɴ̩/.	⟨ch⟩
ʒ	ʒ		⟨zh⟩
ʒ	dʒ	After /ɴ̩/.	⟨j⟩
m	m		⟨m⟩
n	n		⟨n⟩
ɲ	ɲ		⟨ny⟩
ŋ	ŋ		⟨ŋ⟩
N̩	m̩ n̩ ŋ̍	Homorganic with following C. Carries tone.	⟨m⟩, ⟨n⟩
w	w		⟨w⟩
ɥ	ɥ		⟨ẅ⟩
j	j		⟨y⟩

Sequences are:

py (mby), ly (ndy), ty, ky, ngy, my, kẅ, ngẅ (= /kʷj, ɡʷj/)
pw (mbw), lw (ndw), tw, tsw, chw, shw, sw, zw, zhw, nw, nyw, ŋw

All noun and verb roots begin with a consonant; initial vowels are necessarily prefixes. Only /a, ɨ/ occur in prefixes or at the beginning of words, and only /ə/ occurs in suffixes. /ɨ, y/ do not occur at the ends of words.

=== Vowels ===
Vowels
Phoneme	Orthography
i	i
y	ʉ
ɛ	e
a	a
ɔ	o
u	u
ə	ə
ɨ	ɨ

All known long vowels may occur medially or at ends of words, none at the beginning, though long /ɛ, y/ are not attested. Long vowels are written double: aa, əə, ii, ‿ɨɨ, oo, uu. Diphthongs ie, iə, ʉə, ɨə, uə take a single tone.

Tones are high, mid, low, rising, falling. They are written as in IPA, apart from low, which is not written: á ā a ǎ â. Falling tone is largely confined to suffixes, and rising tone is rare, found only on a few nouns such as tǎ 'father'.
