= Konda language =

Konda language may refer to:

- Konda language (Papuan), a language of West Papua, Indonesia
- Konda language (Dravidian), a language of India
- Konda, a dialect of the Khanty language of Russia, see Khanty language#Varieties
- Konda, a dialect of the Mongo language, spoken in the Democratic Republic of the Congo
- Konda, a dialect of the Ngwo language, spoken in Cameroon
