= Menyam language =

Grassfields language spoken in Cameroon

Bamenyam
- Region: Cameroon
- Ethnicity: Bamileke
- Native speakers: (4,000 cited 1994)
- Language family: Niger–Congo?: Atlantic–Congo; Volta-Congo; Benue–Congo; Bantoid; Southern Bantoid; Grassfields; Eastern Grassfields; Mbam-Nkam; Nun; Bamenyam

Language codes
- ISO 639-3: bce
- Glottolog: bame1260

The Menyam language, Bamenyam, is a Grassfields Bantu language of Cameroon.
