= Nun languages =

Language family in central Africa

Nun
- Geographic distribution: Grassfields of western Cameroon
- Linguistic classification: Niger–Congo?: Atlantic–Congo; Volta-Congo; Benue–Congo; Bantoid; Southern Bantoid; Grassfields; Eastern Grassfields; Mbam-Nkam; Nun

Language codes
- ISO 639-3: –
- Glottolog: mbam1253

The Nun languages are a group of Eastern Grassfields languages spoken by the Bamum (Mum) and related peoples of the Western High Plateau of Cameroon.

The languages are:

Bamum (Mum, Shu Paməm; Bapi dialect)
Baba (Bapa)
Bafanji (Fanji, Chufieʼ)
Bangolan (Ngolan)
Bambalang (Mbalang, Chrambo)
Mungaʼka (Ngaaka)

dialects: Li (Bali Nyonga), Ndeng (Bandeng), Ti (Bati)

core: Bamali (Mali, Chopechop), Bamenyan (Mamenyan), Bamukumbit (Mankong), Ndzerem
