= Bangolan language =

Grassfields Bantu language of Cameroon

Bangolan
- Bǎŋgulaŋ
- sɔ́ŋnə́ ŋgbáŋlɛ
- Region: Cameroon
- Ethnicity: Bamileke
- Native speakers: 14,000 (2011)
- Language family: Niger–Congo?: Atlantic–Congo; Volta-Congo; Benue–Congo; Bantoid; Southern Bantoid; Grassfields; Eastern Grassfields; Mbam-Nkam; Nun; Bangolan

Language codes
- ISO 639-3: bgj
- Glottolog: bang1356

Bangolan (sɔ́ŋnə́ ŋgbáŋlɛ) is a Grassfields Bantu language of Cameroon.

== Phonology ==
=== Consonants ===
Consonants
| | | Labial | Coronal | Back | Labial-velar |
|---|---|---|---|---|---|
| Plosive | voiceless | | t | k | kp |
| Plosive | voiced | b | d | g | gb |
| Fricative | voiceless | f | s | h | |
| Fricative | voiced | v | z | | |
| Affricate | | | t͡s | | |
| Nasal | | m | n | ŋ | |
| Approximant | | | j | | w |

- /b/ is [b] after nasals (e.g., [mbé] 'nail') and [p] elsewhere (e.g., [pà] 'bag').
- /d/ is [d] after nasals (e.g., [ndɔ́ŋ] 'horn'), [l]~[ɾ] between vowels or after syllable-final consonants (e.g., [túŋlə̀]~[túŋɾə̀] 'ear'), and [l] elsewhere (e.g., [lə̀ŋ] 'chair').
- /g/ is [g] after nasals (e.g., [ŋgùt] 'skin') and [ɣ] elsewhere (e.g., [ɣàtə́] 'divide').
- /t/ is [tʰ] before [u] in open syllables (e.g., [tʰú] 'dig (verb)') and [t] elsewhere (e.g., [túŋ] 'dig (verb)').
- /k/ is [ʔ] between vowels or syllable-finally (e.g., [nàʔ] 'cow') and [k] elsewhere (e.g., [kú] 'die (verb)').
- /z/ is [d͡ʒ] in labialized or palatalized syllables after nasal consonants (e.g., [nd͡ʒìŋ] 'darkness'), [ʒ] in labialized or palatalized syllables (e.g., [wǎʒwí] 'lion'), [d͡z] after nasal consonants (e.g., [nd͡zə̀] 'dream', and [z] elsewhere (e.g., [zí] 'face').
- /s/ is [ʃ] in labialized or palatalized syllables (e.g., [ʃíʃí] 'vein') and [s] elsewhere (e.g., [sáŋ] 'corn').
- /t͡s/ is [t͡ʃ] in labialized or palatalized syllables (e.g., [t͡ʃì] 'blood') and [t͡s] elsewhere (e.g., [t͡sɔ̀t] 'mouth').
- /ʔ, t, ŋ/ are the only syllable-final consonants.

=== Vowels ===
Vowels
| | Front | Central | Back |
|---|---|---|---|
| Close | i | ɨ | u |
| Close-mid | e | | o |
| Open-mid | ɛ | ə | ɔ |
| Open | | a | |

/ɨ/ does not occur in labialized or palatalized syllables, and /ə, u, o, ɔ/ do not occur in palatalized syllables. /e, o, ɨ/ cannot occur in closed syllables before /ŋ/.

=== Tone ===
Bangolan has lexical and grammatical tone. Lexical tone contrasts [nd͡zɔ̂ŋ] 'clitoris' with [nd͡zɔ̏ŋ] 'thorn', while grammatical tone contrasts [à wé] 'he has gone' with [à wē] 'he is going'.

There are three level tones (high [á], mid [ā], low [à]) and three contour tones (low-rising [ǎ], high-low falling [â], and low-falling [ȁ]). The mid tone is rare but contrasts with the high and low-falling tones.
