= Ngiemboon language =

Bamileke language spoken in Cameroon

Ngiemboon
- Shwóŋò ngiembɔɔn
- Native to: Cameroon
- Region: Province de l'Ouest, Bamboutos
- Native speakers: 250,000 (2007)
- Language family: Niger–Congo?: Atlantic–Congo; Volta-Congo; Benue–Congo; Bantoid; Southern Bantoid; Grassfields; Eastern Grassfields; Mbam-Nkam; Bamiléké; West Bamileke; Bamboutos; Ngiemboon

Language codes
- ISO 639-3: nnh
- Glottolog: ngie1241

The Ngiemboon language, (autonym: Ngiembɔɔn), is one of a dozen Bamileke languages spoken in Cameroon. Its speakers are located primarily within the department of Bamboutos in the West Region of Cameroon.

Dialects are Batcham (Basham), Balatchi (Balaki) and Bamoungong (Bamongoun).

== Alphabet ==
The alphabet is based on the General Alphabet of Cameroon Languages

Alphabet
Uppercase
A	B	C	D	E	Ɛ	F	G	H	I	J	K	L	M	N	Ŋ	O	Ɔ	P	Pf	R	S	Sh	T	Ts	U	Ʉ	V	W	Ẅ	Y	Ÿ	Z	ʼ
Lowercase
a	b	c	d	e	ɛ	f	g	h	i	j	k	l	m	n	ŋ	o	ɔ	p	pf	r	s	sh	t	ts	u	ʉ	v	w	ẅ	y	ÿ	z	ʼ

== Phonology ==
=== Consonants ===
		Labial	Coronal	Palatal	Dorsal
Nasal		m	n		ŋ
Plosive	unvoiced		t		k
Plosive	voiced	b	d		g
Affricate		pf	ts		
Fricative	unvoiced	f	s		(h)
Fricative	voiced	v	z		
Approximant			(ɾ)	j	ɰ*
Approximant	labialized			ɥ*	w

Anderson (2008) states the language allows roots of C(S)V(C)(V), with the above consonants being the underlying consonants allowed. /ɥ ɰ/ do not occur naturally in the role of C, but are allowed as semivowels (S) where they are distinct from /j w/. As well, there is a possible syllabic nasal prefix, which assimilates to following consonants, and can carry a high or low tone. It is spelled as ⟨m⟩ before labial consonants and ⟨n⟩ otherwise.

Phonemes /b d g k/ are pronounced [p l ɣ k] when word initial, [β l ʁ ʔ] intervocalically, and [p t q ʔ] before the -te suffix and word finally. When word final, those are unreleased, as well as /m ŋ/. /s z ts/ are pronounced [ʃ ʒ tʃ] before [u ɯ]. The other coronals, /t d n/ are normally dental, but become retroflex [ʈ ɖ~ɭ ɳ] in that environment.

Obstruents become "aspirated" before both a semivowel and either /e/ or /o/ in an open syllable. This is realized as a "homorganic voiceless fricative offglide", causing the voiceless fricatives and affricates to become geminate, as well as voiced sounds to form a cluster with the unvoiced sound; for example, [ts] becomes [ts:], and [dz] becomes [dzs]. However, a number of words also show this "aspiration" in positions without a following semivowel, all with the previous sounds being [bv], [f], [v], [dz], [s], or [z].

/ɥ ɰ/ are spelled as ⟨ẅ ÿ⟩. [ɾ h] are only present in loanwords. Additionally, certain allophones have separate letters assigned to them, namely [ʔ] ⟨'⟩, [p] ⟨p⟩, [l~ɭ] ⟨l⟩, [tʃ] ⟨c⟩, [ʃ] ⟨sh⟩, [ʒ~dʒ] ⟨j⟩. Consonants are otherwise spelled as in IPA, except [j] spelled as ⟨y⟩.

=== Vowels ===
	Front	Central	Back
Close	i		u
Close-mid	e		o
Open-mid	ɛ		ɔ
Open		a	

Vowels are also distinguished by length and nasalization. Nasalization is present when before /ŋ/, but also sometimes without a following consonant, with the vowel always being long; this is analyzed as a following /n/ being fused with the vowel, since [n] is never found word-finally where it would be expected. Additionally, the sounds [y ɯ] are present, and analyzed as /ɥi ju/; the first can vary, [ɥi~y], while the second cannot, always being [ɯ]; it is spelled as ⟨ʉ⟩. Long vowels are simply marked with two of the vowel.

Diphthongs /ie iε ia oe ʉe ʉa ue ua uɔ/ occur and are spelled as sequences of the two vowels would be. Nasalized vowels are not marked; they are simply implied by the following ⟨ŋ⟩, or by the long vowel spelling followed by ⟨n⟩, consistent with the analyses of these being from a phonemic /n/.

=== Tones ===
Ngiembɔɔn is a tonal language, and uses the high tone /˦/, the low tone /˨/, the falling tone /˥˩/, and the rising tone /˩˥/. Anderson suggests a fifth tone/˨˩/, low falling. These are marked (using <a> as an example) as <á a â ǎ ȁ>. It is marked on the first letter of long vowels and diphthongs.
