= Baldemu language =

Chadic language spoken in Cameroon

Baldemu
- Mbazlam
- Baldare
- Native to: Cameroon
- Region: Far North Province
- Native speakers: 4 (2003)
- Language family: Afro-Asiatic: Chadic; Biu–Mandara; North; Maroua; Baldemu

Language codes
- ISO 639-3: bdn
- Glottolog: bald1241
- ELP: Baldemu
- Coordinates: 10°51′N 14°38′E

Baldemu, or Mbazlam, is a nearly extinct Afro-Asiatic language spoken in northern Cameroon. Baldemu is spoken in Bogo commune, Diamaré department, Far North Region by only 5 speakers as of 2012. Speakers have been shifting to Fulfulde.

== Name ==
The language is (or was) known as Baldemu or Baldare to its speakers. It is sometimes rendered Baldamu, Balda, Mbazlam, or Mbazla.

Baldamu is mentioned in Bryan and Westermann's Handbook of African Languages under the name Balda, suspected to be only a toponym. It is most closely related to Giziga, Mofu Duvangar, and Mofu Gudur according to C. Seignobos and H. Tourneux.

== Status ==
Since migrating from the surrounding mountains to the village of Balda, Baldemu speakers have shifted to Fulfulde. Baldemu speakers who migrated to Kaélé similarly shifted to Mundang.
