= Mengaka language =

Bamileke language spoken in Cameroon

Mengaka
- Məgaka, Bagam
- Eghap
- Region: Cameroon
- Ethnicity: Bamileke
- Native speakers: (20,000 cited 1993)
- Language family: Niger–Congo?: Atlantic–Congo; Volta-Congo; Benue–Congo; Bantoid; Southern Bantoid; Grassfields; Eastern Grassfields; Mbam-Nkam; Bamileke; Mengaka
- Writing system: Bagam script

Language codes
- ISO 639-3: xmg
- Glottolog: meng1264

Mengaka (Məgaka), or Mengaka Bamileke, is a Bamileke language of Cameroon. It was written in an indigenous script called Bagam.
