= Awing language =

Grassfields Bantu language spoken in Cameroon

Awing
- Mbwe'wi
- Native to: Cameroon
- Native speakers: (19,000 cited 2001)
- Language family: Niger–Congo?: Atlantic–Congo; Volta-Congo; Benue–Congo; Bantoid; Southern Bantoid; Grassfields; Eastern Grassfields; Mbam-Nkam; Ngemba; Awing

Language codes
- ISO 639-3: azo
- Glottolog: awin1248

Awing, or Mbwe'wi, is a Grassfields language spoken in Cameroon.

== Alphabet ==
The Awing alphabet was proposed by translation consultants for SIL International and the Cameroon Association For Bible Translation and Literacy (CABTAL) in 2005. It was since then used for publishing Bible translations, Awing folk stories, and other materials.

The Awing alphabet is based on an adapted Latin script. It is made up of 9 vowel letters and 22 consonant letters. The letters H, Q, R, V, and X are dropped, and several special characters and digraphs, as well as the apostrophe are added to transcribe Awing phonetic sounds. The consonant phone [l] varies freely with [ɾ] between vowels inside a root. Thus, the R-sound is denoted by the letter L.

Uppercase	A	B	Ch	D	E	Ɛ	Ə	F	G	Gh	I	Ɨ	J	K	ʼ	L	M	N	Ny	Ŋ	O	Ɔ	P	S	Sh	T	Ts	U	W	Y	Z
Lowercase	a	b	ch	d	e	ɛ	ə	f	g	gh	i	ɨ	j	k	ʼ	l	m	n	ny	ŋ	o	ɔ	p	s	sh	t	ts	u	w	y	z
IPA	[a]	[b]	[tʃ]	[d]	[e]	[ɛ]	[ə]	[f]	[ɡ]	[ɣ]	[i]	[ɨ]	[ʒ], [dʒ]	[k]	[ʔ]	[l], [ɾ]	[m]	[n]	[ɲ]	[ŋ]	[o]	[ɔ]	[p]	[s]	[ʃ]	[t], [tʰ]	[ts]	[u]	[w], [ɥ]	[j]	[z], [dz]

Long vowels are indicated by repeating the vowel letter.

⟨n⟩, ⟨m⟩, ⟨ŋ⟩, and ⟨ny⟩ may be syllabic nasals ([n̩], [m̩], [ŋ̍], [ɲ̩]).

Tones are indicated using diacritics on the first vowel or nasal of the syllable. Both high and mid tone are marked with the acute accent, and the low tone is not explicitly written:

Tone	IPA	Grapheme
High	á	á
Mid	ā	á
Low	à	a
Rising	ǎ	ǎ
Falling	â	â

Diaeresis on the vowel before the verb marks the habitual aspect.
