= Dzodinka =

Grassfields language of Cameroon

- Region: Cameroon, Nigeria
- Native speakers: (2,600 in Cameroon cited 2000); 1 village across border in Nigeria
- Language family: Niger–Congo?: Atlantic–Congo; Benue–Congo; Southern Bantoid; Grassfields; Eastern; Nkambe; Dzodinka

Language codes
- ISO 639-3: add
- Glottolog: dzod1238

Dzodinka or Lidzonka is a Grassfields language of Cameroon.
