= Bambalang language =

Grassfields language spoken in Cameroon

Bambalang
- Chrambo
- Region: Cameroon
- Ethnicity: Bamileke
- Native speakers: 29,000 (2008)
- Language family: Niger–Congo?: Atlantic–Congo; Volta-Congo; Benue–Congo; Bantoid; Southern Bantoid; Grassfields; Eastern Grassfields; Mbam-Nkam; Nun; Bambalang

Language codes
- ISO 639-3: bmo
- Glottolog: bamb1265

The Bambalang language, also called Chrambo (Chirambo, Tshirambo) or Mbawyakum (Mboyakum), is a Grassfields Bantu language of Cameroon.

== Phonology ==
=== Consonants ===
These phones and phonemes were enumerated by Grove in 2007 and refined by Wright in 2012.

Phonemes
		Labial		Alveolar		Palatal		Velar		Glottal
Stop/Affricate	Voiceless	/p/	/pː/	/t/	/tː/	/t͡ʃ/	/t͡ʃː/	/k/	/kː/	
Stop/Affricate	Voiced						/d͡ʒː/		/gː/	
Fricative	Voiceless	/f/	/fː/			/ʃ/	/ʃː/			/h/
Fricative	Voiced	/v/	/vː/					/ɣ/		
Nasal		/m/	/mː/	/n/	/nː/	/ɲ/		/ŋ/		
Approximant				/l/	/lː/	/j/		/w/		

Phones
		Labial		Alveolar		Palatal		Velar		Glottal
Stop/Affricate	Voiceless	[p]	[pʰ]	[t]	[tʰ]	[t͡ʃ]	[t͡ʃː]	[k]	[kʰ]	[ʔ] (Note: [ʔ] is the allophone of /k/ in a CVCV structure.)
Stop/Affricate	Voiced	[b] (Note: [b] is an always prenasalized allophone of /p/.)	[bʰ]	[d] (Note: [d] is an always prenasalized allophone of /l/.)	[dʰ]	[d͡ʒ] (Note: [d͡ʒ] is an allophone of /j/ before /n/.)	[d͡ʒː]	[g] (Note: [g] is an allophone of /ɣ/ after a nasal.)	[gː]	
Fricative	Voiceless	[f]	[fː]			[ʃ]	[ʃː]			[h]
Fricative	Voiced	[v]	[vː]					[ɣ]		
Tap				[ɾ] (Note: [ɾ] is an allophone of /l/ in a consonant cluster or a CVCV structure.)						
Nasal		[m]~[ɱ] (Note: [ɱ] is an allophone of /m/ before labiodental consonants.)	[mː]	[n]	[nː]	[ɲ]		[ŋ]		
Approximant				[l]	[lː]	[j]~[ʒ]	[ɥ] (Note: [ɥ] is an allophone of /w/ before /i/.)~[w]			

=== Vowels ===
	Front	Central	Back
Close	/i/ /ĩ/	/ɨ/ /ɨ̃/	/u/ /ũ/
Close-mid	/e/		/o/ /õ/
Mid		/ə/ /ə̃/	
Open-mid	/ɛ/ /ɛ̃/		/ɔ/
Open	/a/ /ã/		

==== Diphthongs ====
In addition to simple oral and nasal vowels, Bambalang also has oral and nasal diphthongs and vowel sequences. Grove and Wright do not specify whether nasal diphthongs are truly diphthongs or vowel sequences.

Orthographic	Phonemic	Phonetic
ei	/ei/	[ei̯]
ou	/ou/	[ou̯]
ao	/ao/	[ao̯]
əɨ	/əɨ/	[ə.ɨ]
ie	/ie/	[i.e]
ia	/ia/	[i.a]
ua	/ua/	[u.a]
uo	/uo/	[u.o]
aoŋ	/aõ/	
ɛiŋ	/ɛĩ/	
ieŋ	/iẽ/	
iɛŋ	/iɛ̃/	
iaŋ	/iã/	
uoŋ	/uõ/	

=== Tone ===
In addition, Bambalang has both lexical and grammatical tone.

Tones in Bambalang

Tone	High (H)	Low (L)*		Rising (LH)	Falling (HL)
Diacritic	á	à	ā	ǎ	a

*ā for verbs; à for other types of words

== Orthography ==
A segmental orthography was created for Bambalang in 2007 and revised in 2012.

Orthography
Upper	Lower	Phone
A	a	[a]
B	b	[b]
Ch	ch	[t͡ʃ]
D	d	[d]
E	e	[e]
Ɛ	ɛ	[ɛ]
Ə	ə	[ə]
F	f	[f]
G	g	[g]
Gh	gh	[ɣ]
H	h	[h]
I	i	[i]
Ɨ	ɨ	[ɨ]
J	j	[d͡ʒ]
K	k	[k]
L	l	[l]
M	m	[m], [ɱ]
N	n	[n]
Ŋ	ŋ	[ŋ], [◌̃]
O	o	[ɔ]
Ɔ	ɔ	[ɔ]
P	p	[p]
R	r	[ɾ]
Sh	sh	[ʃ]
T	t	[t]
U	u	[u], [y]
V	v	[v]
W	w	[w], [y]
Y	y	[ʒ]~[j]
’		[ʔ]

== Works cited ==
- Binam Bikoi, Charles, ed. (2012). Atlas linguistique du Cameroun (ALCAM) [Linguistic Atlas of Cameroon]. Atlas linguistique de l'Afrique centrale (ALAC) (in French). Vol. 1: Inventaire des langues. Yaoundé: CERDOTOLA. ISBN 9789956796069.
- Grove, Dan; Wright, Jennifer (June 2012). "Bambalang (Chrambo) Orthography Guide" (PDF) (Revised ed.). SIL.
