= Ngomba language =

Grassfieldlanguage of Cameroon

Ngomba
- Cú ŋgɔ́mbaa
- Region: Cameroon
- Ethnicity: Grassfield people
- Native speakers: (63,000 cited 1999)
- Language family: Niger–Congo?: Atlantic–Congo; Volta-Congo; Benue–Congo; Bantoid; Southern Bantoid; Grassfields; Eastern Grassfields; Mbam-Nkam; Bamileke; Ngomba

Language codes
- ISO 639-3: jgo
- Glottolog: ngom1272

Ngomba, Nda’a or Nguemba, is a Grassfield language of Cameroon.

Ngomba, Nda’a or Nguemba in English goes as "I am saying that...."
