= Ngaʼka language =

Grassfields language spoken in Cameroon

Ngaʼka
- Bali
- Mungaʼka
- Native to: Cameroon
- Region: Bali Nyonga
- Ethnicity: Chamba
- Native speakers: (50,000 cited 1982)
- Language family: Niger–Congo?: Atlantic–Congo; Volta-Congo; Benue–Congo; Bantoid; Southern Bantoid; Grassfields; Eastern Grassfields; Mbam-Nkam; Nun; Ngaʼka
- Dialects: Bati (Ti); Bali (Li); Bandeng (Nde)

Language codes
- ISO 639-3: mhk
- Glottolog: mung1266

The Ngaʼka language, or Mungaʼka, also known as Bali, is a Grassfields language spoken by the people of Bali Nyonga in Cameroon. They are the descendants of the Chamba of northern Nigeria.

== Phonology ==
The sounds of Munga'ka are as follows:

=== Consonant inventory ===
	Bilabial		Labiodental		Alveolar		Postalveolar	Palatal	Velar		Glottal
Plosive	p	b			t	d			k	ɡ	ʔ
Nasal		m				n			ŋ		
Fricative			f	v	s			ɣ			
Affricate					t͡ʃ	d͡ʒ	ʒ				
Approximant	w						j				
Lateral approximant					l						

=== Vowel inventory ===
	Front	Central	Back
High	i	ʉ	u
High-Mid		ə	o
Low-Mid	ɛ	ə	ɔ
Low	a		
