= Metaʼ language =

Grassfields language spoken in Cameroon

Metaʼ
- Native to: Cameroon
- Native speakers: 190,000 (2010)
- Language family: Niger–Congo?: Atlantic–Congo; Volta-Congo; Benue–Congo; Bantoid; Southern Bantoid; Grassfields; Eastern Grassfields; Momo; Metaʼ
- Dialects: Moghamo; Ngamambo

Language codes
- ISO 639-3: Either: mgo – Metaʼ nbv – Ngamambo
- Glottolog: meta1238

Metaʼ is a Grassfields language of Cameroon. The Moghamo variety is perhaps divergent enough to be considered a separate language. Ngamambo is 88% similar lexically to Meta’, and often is considered separate.
