= Ngemba languages =

Grassfields language group of Africa

Ngemba
- Geographic distribution: Grassfields of western Cameroon and Taraba State, Nigeria
- Linguistic classification: Niger–Congo?: Atlantic–Congo; Volta-Congo; Benue–Congo; Bantoid; Southern Bantoid; Grassfields; Eastern Grassfields; Mbam-Nkam; Ngemba

Language codes
- ISO 639-3: –
- Glottolog: ngem1254

The Ngemba languages are a group of Eastern Grassfields languages of the Western High Plateau of Cameroon.

The languages are Awing (Mbweʼwi), Bafut–Beba, Bambili Mbeligi, Mbui Bambui, Mendankwe-Nkwen–Mankon–Mundum (Ngemba), Pinyin, Alatening, Chomba, Mbetuʼu, Akum. Babadjou and Bamessingue in the west region are also Nguemba but mostly considered otherwise because they are not in the Northwest region of Cameroon.

In the West and North West regions of Cameroon, languages are often referred to by the name of the village or town where they are spoken. For example, Ghomáláʼ is a Bamileke language spoken in Batié, in the West Region of Cameroon, and is referred to as Batié.

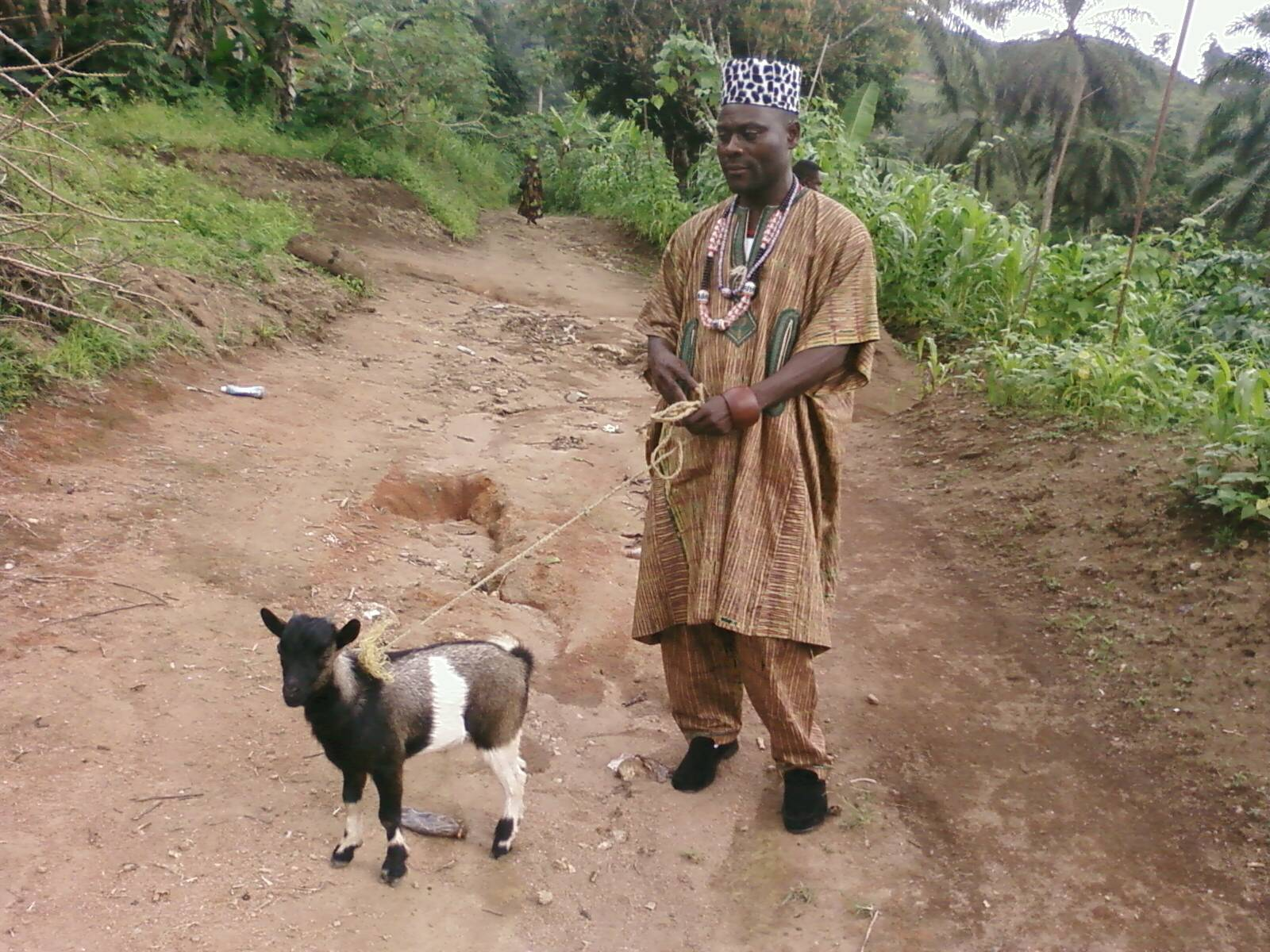
Traditional clothing called Togho

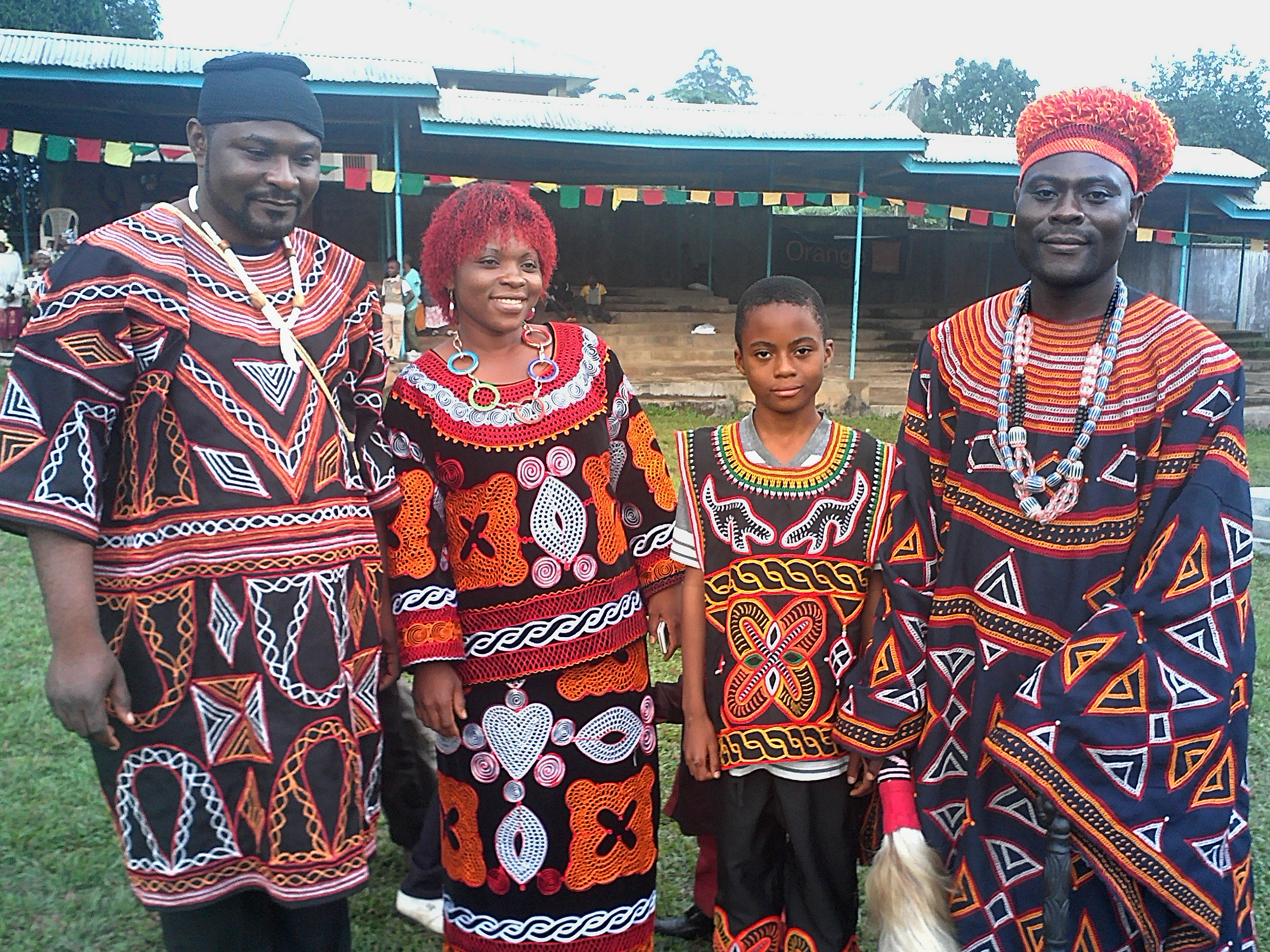
Another Togho
