= Bali Nyonga =

Chiefdom town in Cameroon

- Traditional chiefdom
- Country: Cameroon
- Region: Northwest Region
- Division: Mezam Division
- Subdivision: Bali Subdivision

Government
  - Type: Traditional monarchy

Bali Nyonga is a traditional chiefdom town in the Northwest Region of the country Cameroon on the West Central borders on the continent of Africa. It is one of the prominent Grassfields chiefdoms and serves as the home of the Bali Nyonga, a people of the Chamba Leko group - an entity that migrated from Chamba around 1600. Their language is known as mungaka.

== History ==
Bali Nyonga traces its origins to Chamba migrations, with traditions linking its founding to the leadership of Gawolbe. The chiefdom has played a significant role in regional politics and cultural preservation.

== Culture ==
The chiefdom is known for its rich cultural heritage, including traditional dances, festivals, and the use of masquerades. The Fon (traditional ruler) plays both administrative and spiritual roles.

== Administration ==
Bali Nyonga is governed by a Fon, assisted by a council of elders and traditional societies.
