= Bamali language =

Grassfields language of Cameroon

Bamali
- Chopechop
- Pronunciation: [tʃɔpɛtʃɔp]
- Region: Cameroon
- Ethnicity: Bamileke
- Native speakers: 10,800 (2008)
- Language family: Niger–Congo?: Atlantic–Congo; Volta-Congo; Benue–Congo; Bantoid; Southern Bantoid; Grassfields; Eastern Grassfields; Mbam-Nkam; Nun; Bamali

Language codes
- ISO 639-3: bbq
- Glottolog: bama1251

The Bamali language, Chopechop, is a Grassfields Bantu language of Cameroon.
