= Joseph Mfonyam =

Joseph Ngwa Mfonyam (born February 7, 1948, in Bafut in the North West Province of Cameroon) works with the Bafut Language Association as an SIL International consultant.

== Life ==
Mfonyam studied linguistics at the University of Yaoundé, getting his PhD in 1982. His work dealt with creating an alphabet for the Bafut language. Currently he lives in Bafut with his wife and two of his 5 children.

== Work ==
Mfonyam published several books on the Bafut Language and was the head of the New Testament translation Project in Bafut, which was finished in the year 2000. Since then he has been working as Linguistics and Translation consultant for SIL Cameroon. He has been involved in training and checking Scripture translation of other language groups. He has written a number of books covering, anthropology, theological education and Christian Education. He has written and published a number of Linguistic articles.
