= Bamileke languages =

Grassfields language group of Cameroon

Bamileke
- Bamiléké
- Geographic distribution: Grassfields of western Cameroon
- Ethnicity: Bamileke people
- Linguistic classification: Niger–Congo?: Atlantic–Congo; Volta-Congo; Benue–Congo; Bantoid; Southern Bantoid; Grassfields; Eastern Grassfields; Mbam-Nkam; Bamileke
- Proto-language: Proto-Bamileke
- Subdivisions: Eastern Bamileke; Western Bamileke

Language codes
- ISO 639-2 / 5: bai
- Glottolog: bami1239

The Bamileke languages (Bamileke languages: Bamiléké) are a group of Eastern Grassfields languages spoken by the Bamileke people in the Western High Plateau of Cameroon.

The languages, which might constitute two branches of Eastern Grassfields, are:

- Western Bamileke: Mengaka (Məgaka), Ngombale, Ngomba (Nguemba or Ngemba), the "Bamboutos" dialect cluster of Yɛmba, Ngyɛmbɔɔŋ, Mmuock and Ŋwe
- Eastern Bamileke: Feʼfeʼ, Ghɔmáláʼ, Kwaʼ, Ndaʼndaʼ, Mədʉmba.
