= Aghem language =

Grassfields language spoken in Cameroon

Aghem
- Wum
- Yum
- Native to: Cameroon
- Region: Menchum
- Native speakers: (27,000 cited 2000)
- Language family: Niger–Congo?: Atlantic–Congo; Benue–Congo; Southern Bantoid; Grassfields; Ring; West; Aghem

Language codes
- ISO 639-3: agq
- Glottolog: aghe1239

Aghem (Wum or Yum) is a Grassfields Bantu language spoken in the Wum Central Sub-division in Menchum Division of the North West Region of Cameroon.

== Phonology ==
=== Consonants ===
The consonants of Aghem are shown below.

		Bilabial		Labiodental		Alveolar		Post- alveolar		Palatal	Labial–velar		Velar		Glottal
Nasal			m				n			ɲ		ŋm		ŋ	
Plosive	unasp.		b				d				kp	gb		g	ʔ
Plosive	asp.	pʰ				tʰ							kʰ		
Affricate				p̪f	b̪v	ts	dz	t̠ʃ	d̠ʒ						
Fricative				f	v			ʃ	ʒ					ɣ	
Approximant	Median									j				w	
Approximant	Lateral						l								

=== Vowels ===
	Front	Near-front	Near-back	Back
Close	i			u
Near-close		ɪ	ʊ	
Close-mid	e			o
Open-mid	ɛ			ɔ
Open	a			ɒ

Aghem has two tones. High tone and low tone.
