= Fut language =

Grassfields language spoken in Cameroon

Bafut
- Fut
- Bufe
- Region: Cameroon
- Native speakers: 100,000 (2009)
- Language family: Niger–Congo?: Atlantic–Congo; Volta-Congo; Benue–Congo; Bantoid; Southern Bantoid; Grassfields; Eastern Grassfields; Mbam-Nkam; Ngemba; Bafut
- Dialects: Bufe (Afughe)

Language codes
- ISO 639-3: bfd
- Glottolog: bafu1246

The Bafut language, Fut, is an Eastern Grassfields language of the Niger–Congo languages, and related to Bamum. Oral tradition traces dynastic origins to the Ndobo or Tikari areas. It is spoken by people of Bafut Subdivision, Tuba, in the division of Mezam and in the division of Metchum in Northwest Province, Cameroon.

The Bafut language was alphabetized by SIL International consultant Joseph Mfonyam in 1982. Since then, some literature has been translated into Bafut, most notably the New Testament in 2000.

== Writing system ==
Alphabet (AGLC)
A	B	D	E	Ɛ	Ə	F	G	GH	I	Ɨ	J	K	L	M	N	Ŋ	ŊY	O	Ɔ	R	S	T	TS	U	W	Y	Z	ʼ
a	b	d	e	ɛ	ə	f	g	gh	i	ɨ	j	k	l	m	n	ŋ	ŋy	o	ɔ	r	s	t	ts	u	w	y	z	ʼ
