= Menka language =

Grassfields language of Cameroon

Menka
- Native to: Cameroon
- Native speakers: (5,200 cited 2000)
- Language family: Niger–Congo?: Atlantic–Congo; Benue–Congo; Southern Bantoid; Grassfields; Southwest; Menka–Atoŋ; Menka

Language codes
- ISO 639-3: mea
- Glottolog: menk1238
- ELP: Menka

Menka is a Grassfields language of Cameroon. Other names include Mamwoh and Wando Bando. It is spoken by an estimated 5,200 people.

== Sources ==
- Blench, Roger (2010) Classification of Momo and West Momo
