= Vame language =

Afroasiatic language

Vame
- Pəlasla
- Native to: Cameroon
- Region: Far North Province
- Native speakers: (8,500 cited 1992)
- Language family: Afro-Asiatic: Chadic; Biu–Mandara; Wandala–Mafa; Mafa (A.5); Northeast; Vame

Language codes
- ISO 639-3: mlr
- Glottolog: vame1236

Vame or Pelasla is an Afroasiatic language spoken in northern Cameroon.

== Dialects ==
Dialects are Dəmwa (Dume?), Hurza, Mayo-Plata (Pəlasla, Gwendele), Mbərem (Vame-Mbreme), and Ndreme (Vame). Pelasla is the name preferred by ALCAM (2012), since Mayo-Plata (Pelasla) is the main market town.

The Pelasla inhabit the same massif as the Wuzlam, whose customs they have adopted but not their language. Administrative censuses include them as part of the "Ouldeme" people (in the canton of Mayo-Ouldémé, arrondissement of Tokombéré, department of Mayo-Sava, Far North Region).

The name Vame-Mbreme should be avoided, since "Vame" is a Wandala term, and includes Ndreme and Mbreme.

The Démwa, Ndreme and Mbérem live in the southern part of Mora-Massif canton (arrondissement of Mora, department of Mayo-Sava, Far North Region), overlooking the Mayo-Plata depression. The Démwa are located to the north, towards the top of the massif, and the Ndreme and Mbérem to the east, in the mountain ranges overlooking the Mayo-Sava plain. The Hurza traditionally lived in the Hurza massif, isolated in the plain between Mayo-Sava and Mayo-Ouldémé and overlooking the market of Mémé (canton of Mémé, arrondissement of Mora). There are 8,500 speakers total, who have now descended to the surrounding plain and are mixed with other ethnic groups.

== Writing system ==
Vame alphabet
| a | b | ɓ | d | ɗ | dz | j | e | ə | f | g | gw | gh | ghw | h | hw | i | k | kw | l | m | mb | n | nd | ny |
| nz | nj | ŋ | ŋw | ŋg | ŋgw | p | r | s | sh | sl | t | ts | c | u | v | w | y | z | zh | zl | | | | |

Vame is a tonal language, but the tones are not marked.
