= Ambele language =

Grassfields language of Cameroon

Ambele
- Native to: Cameroon
- Native speakers: 5,000 (2005)
- Language family: Niger–Congo?: Atlantic–Congo; Volta-Congo; Benue–Congo; Bantoid; Southern Bantoid; Grassfields; Ambele

Language codes
- ISO 639-3: ael
- Glottolog: ambe1247
- ELP: Ambele

Ambele is a Grassfields language of Cameroon.

== Phonology ==
=== Consonants ===
The consonants of the Ambele language are located in the chart below.

		Bilabial		Labiodental	Alveolar		Post- alveolar		Palatal	Labial–velar		Velar		Glottal
Nasal			m, mʷ			n			ɲ				ŋ	
Plosive	oral	p	b, bʲ		t, tʷ	d				k͡p, kpʷ	ɡ͡b	k, kʷ	g, ɡʲ	
Plosive	pren.	m͡b			nt	nd				ŋ͡mg͡b		ŋk	ŋɡ	
Affricate							t̠ʃ, t̠ʃʲ, n̠t̠ʃ	d̠ʒ, d̠ʒʷ						
Fricative				f	s, sʲ, sʷ								ɣ	h
Approximant	Median								j	w				
Approximant	Lateral					l								

=== Vowels ===
	Front	Central	Back
Close	i	ɨ, ʉ	u
Close-mid	e		o
Mid		ə	
Open-mid	ɛ		ɔ
Open	a		

There are three tones in the Ambele language. High tone, mid tone, and low tone.
