= Ghomalaʼ language =

Bamileke language spoken in Cameroon

Ghomalaʼ
- Ghɔmáláʼ
- Native to: Cameroon
- Region: West Region (Cameroon)
- Ethnicity: Bamileke
- Native speakers: 350,000 (2005)
- Language family: Niger–Congo?: Atlantic–Congo; Volta-Congo; Benue–Congo; Bantoid; Southern Bantoid; Grassfields; Eastern Grassfields; Mbam-Nkam; Bamileke; Ghomalaʼ
- Writing system: Latin

Language codes
- ISO 639-3: bbj
- Glottolog: ghom1247

Ghomala or Ghɔmáláʼ is a major Bamileke language spoken in Cameroon, originally in the following departments of the West region:

- Mifi, Koung-Khi and Hauts-Plateaux: most of the three departments (except extreme south and except pockets in the north and west)
- Menoua: east of the department
- Bamboutos: a corner in the south

== Phonology ==
=== Consonants ===
Ghomalaʼ consonants
| | | Labial | Alveolar | Palatal | Velar | Glottal |
|---|---|---|---|---|---|---|
| Nasal | | m | n | | ŋ | |
| Plosive | voiceless | p | t | | k | ʔ |
| Plosive | voiced | b | d | | ɡ | |
| Affricate | voiceless | pf | ts | tʃ | | |
| Affricate | voiced | bv | dz | dʒ | | |
| Fricative | voiceless | f | s | (ʃ) | | h |
| Fricative | voiced | (v) | | (ʒ) | (ɣ) | |
| Approximant | unrounded | | (l) | j | ɰ | |
| Approximant | rounded | | | ɥ | w | |

- Only /m ŋ p k ʔ/ occur at syllable coda.
- [v l ʃ ʒ ɣ] are allophones of /bv d tʃ dʒ ɡ/.
- /t d/ may be palatalized [tʲ dʲ] before /i ʉ/.
- /p b t d k/ are affricated [p͡ɸ b͡β t͡θ d͡ð k͡x] before /h/.
- /ɡ/ may be affricated [ɡ͡ɣ] before /ə ɐ/.
- Word-final /k/ may be realized as uvular [q χ].

=== Vowels ===
Ghomalaʼ vowels
| | Front | Central | Back |
|---|---|---|---|
| Close | i | ʉ | u |
| Mid | e | ə | o |
| Mid | ɛ | ɐ | ɔ |
| Open | | a | |

- /ɐ u ɔ/ may be nasalized [ɐ̃ ũ ɔ̃] when occurring with a velar nasal /ŋ/. (onset? coda?)
- /ʉ/ is realized [ʉ ~ ɯ].

=== Tone ===
Six-way tone contrast
| Tone | Isolation | | | Context | | |
|---|---|---|---|---|---|---|
| H | fɐ́ | ⁵⁵ | 'parent' | ǒ ꜜjɔ́ fɐ́ | ⁵⁵ | 'you saw the parent' |
| ꜜH | dhə́ | ⁵⁵ | 'spouse' | ǒ ꜜjɔ́ ꜜdhə́ | ⁴⁴ | 'you saw the spouse' |
| L | tsə̀ | ²² | 'cola nut' | ǒ ꜜjɔ́ tsə̀ | ²² | 'you saw the cola nut' |
| LL | tà | ²¹ | 'pot' | ǒ ꜜjɔ́ tà | ²¹ | 'you saw the pot' |
| LH | bvʉ̌ | ²⁵ | 'dog' | ǒ ꜜjɔ́ ꜜbvʉ́ | ⁴⁴ | 'you saw the dog' |
| HL | bɰə̂ | ⁵¹ | 'madman' | ǒ ꜜjɔ́ bɰə̂ | ⁵¹ | 'you saw the madman' |

=== Orthography ===
Ghomalaʼ alphabet
Majuscule forms (also called uppercase or capital letters)
| A | B | Bv | C | D | Dz | E | Ə | Aə | Ɛ | F | G | Gh | H | I | J | K | L | M | N | Ny | Nt | Ŋ | Ŋk | O | Ɔ | P | Pf | Mpf | R | S | Sh | T | Ts | U | Ʉ | V | Z | Zh | W | Y | ʼ |
Minuscule forms (also called lowercase or small letters)
| a | b | bv | c | d | dz | e | ə | aə | ɛ | f | g | gh | h | i | j | k | l | m | n | ny | nt | ŋ | ŋk | o | ɔ | p | pf | mpf | r | s | sh | t | ts | u | ʉ | v | z | zh | w | y | ʼ |
IPA phonemes (?)
| a | b | bv | tʃ | d | dz | e | ə | ɐ | ɛ | f | g | ɣ | h | i | dʒ | k | l | m | n | ɲ | ⁿt | ŋ | ᵑk | o | ɔ | p | pf | ᶬpf | r | s | ʃ | t | ts | u | ʉ | v | z | ʒ | w | j | ʔ |

== Bibliography ==
- Domche Teko, Engelbert (2012). Étude sociolinguistique du ghomálá-jo dans l'Ouest-Cameroun (in French). Paris: L'Harmattan. p. 74. ISBN 978-2-296-96460-0.
- Eichholzer, Erika; et al., eds. (2002). Dictionnaire ghomalaʼ (PDF) (in French).
- Kayum Fokoue, Carole (2011). De la terminologie de l’éducation à la citoyenneté en langues camerounaises: Le cas du ghómaùláʼ (PDF) (Mémoire) (in French). Université de Yaoundé I.
- Mba, Gabriel (1997). "Les extensions verbales du Ghomala" (PDF). Journal of West African Languages (in French). 26 (1): 77–101.
- Nissim, Gabriel M. (1981). Le Bamileke-Ghomáláʼ (parler de Bandjoun, Cameroun): phonologie - morphologie nominale; comparaison avec des parlers voisins. Langues et civilisations à tradition orale. Paris: SELAF. ISBN 978-2-85297-104-2.
- Rolle, Nicholas (2025). "A tonological rarity: Tone-driven epenthesis in Ghomala'". In Kuznetsova, Natalia; Anderson, Cormac; Easterday, Shelece (eds.). Rarities in phonetics and phonology: Structural, typological, evolutionary, and social dimensions. Berlin: Language Science Press. pp. 359–391. doi:10.5281/zenodo.15148178.
