= Mundani language =

Southern Bantoid language of Cameroon

Mundani
- Native to: Cameroon
- Native speakers: (34,000 cited 1987)
- Language family: Niger–Congo?: Atlantic–Congo; Benue–Congo; Southern Bantoid; Momo; Mundani

Language codes
- ISO 639-3: mnf
- Glottolog: mund1327

Mundani is a Southern Bantoid language of Cameroon.

== Varieties ==
The Mundani Language is one spoken by the Fondoms that makes up the Wabane sub division. The Sub division is made up of the Upper and lower Fondoms or villages. This language is made up of variations. This means that there are little variations from the one spoken by one village to another. At the entrance of the sub division Nkong Fondom from Alou sub division, there is a variation of this dialect called LAP. And when you go further to Bangang you will have another variation and this variation goes right up to the Fondom of Bamumbu.It is practically impossible for one from Bamumbu to hear what another from Nkong is saying and vice versa.You may just pick out some few similar words which will you to be able to understand what he/she is saying. Meanwhile, a person from Nkong village, Bangang, Besali and Bechati will perfectly understand each other. Going up, a person from Bechati, Bamumbu and other villages that end understand each other perfectly too. So, there is just one dialect and this dialect has light variations.

== Writing system ==
Mundani alphabet
Majuscules	A	A̧	B	D	Dz	E	Ȩ	Ə	F	G	Gb	Gh	I	Ɨ	Ɨ̧	K	Kp	’	L	M	N	Ny	Ŋ	Ŋm	O	O̧	Ɔ	Ɔ̧	P	Pf	S	T	Ts	U	U̧	V	W	Y	Z
Minuscules	a	a̧	b	d	dz	e	ȩ	ə	f	g	gb	gh	i	ɨ	ɨ̧	k	kp	’	l	m	n	ny	ŋ	ŋm	o	o̧	ɔ	ɔ̧	p	pf	s	t	ts	u	u̧	v	w	y	z
