= Akum language =

Language spoken in Cameroon and Nigeria

Akum
- Native to: Cameroon, Nigeria
- Region: Taraba State
- Ethnicity: Anyar
- Native speakers: 1,400 in Cameroon (2002) few in Nigeria (no date), three villages
- Language family: Niger–Congo?: Atlantic–Congo; Benue–Congo; Plateau; Yukubenic; Akum–Beezen; Akum

Language codes
- ISO 639-3: aku
- Glottolog: akum1238
- ELP: Akum

Akum is a Plateau language of Cameroon and across the border in Nigeria, where it is known as Shibong.

== Phonology ==
=== Consonants ===
Akum Consonants
	Labial	Coronal	Palatal	Velar	Labio-velar
Nasal	m	n	ɲ	ŋ	ŋm
Plosive	b	t d	c ɟ	k g	kp gb
Prenasalized	ᵐb	ⁿd	ᶮɟ	ᵑɡ	
Affricate		ts dz			
Fricative	f	s ʃ			
Trill		r			
Approximant		l	j		w

Many consonants also have palatalized and labialized variants, but due to a lack of documentation it is unknown whether or not these are phonemic. Only /r/, /b/, /g/, /m/, /n/, and /ŋ/ occur at the end of a syllable, and /ŋ/ only occurs in this position.

=== Vowels ===
Akum Vowels
	Front	Central	Back
High-mid	ɪ		ʊ
Mid	ɛ	ə	ɔ
Low		a	

/ə/ and /ɛ/ may be allophones.

=== Tone ===
Akum has three tones: high, mid, and low.
