= Menchum language =

Bantu language of Cameroon

Menchum
- Befang
- Native to: Cameroon
- Native speakers: (3,000 cited 2000)
- Language family: Niger–Congo?: Atlantic–Congo; Volta-Congo; Benue–Congo; Bantoid; Southern Bantoid; Grassfields; Menchum
- Dialects: Modele–Ushaku; Bangui–Befang–Obang; Okoromandjang

Language codes
- ISO 639-3: bby
- Glottolog: befa1241

Menchum, or Befang, is a Grassfields language of Cameroon.

Befang is the local town and also the name of the Menchum dialect spoken there.
