= Zumaya language =

Extinct Chadic language of Cameroon

Zumaya
- Region: Cameroon
- Extinct: by 2006
- Language family: Afro-Asiatic: Chadic; Masa; North?; Zumaya

Language codes
- ISO 639-3: zuy
- Glottolog: zuma1239
- ELP: Zumaya

Zumaya is an extinct Chadic language once spoken in Cameroon. It is known only from a few words recorded from the last speaker. It may have been divergent within the Masa branch of Chadic.

There are no known speakers; it is thought that the language use has shifted to Fulfulde.

== Geographic distribution ==
About 10 Zumaya words were recorded from what was probably the last speaker of this language by Daniel Barreteau. The language belongs to the Masa group. The last speakers were found at Ouro-Lamordé, on the way to Bogo (Ouro-Zangui canton, Maroua commune, Diamaré department, Far North Region).
