= Bebil language =

Bantu language of Cameroon

Bebil
- Gbïgbïl
- Region: Cameroon
- Native speakers: (6,000 cited 1991)
- Language family: Niger–Congo?: Atlantic–Congo; Benue–Congo; Southern Bantoid; Bantu (Zone A); Beti; Bebil

Language codes
- ISO 639-3: bxp
- Glottolog: bebi1242
- Guthrie code: A.73b

Bebil (Gbïgbïl) is a Bantu language of Cameroon. It is mutually intelligible with other Beti dialects.

There are 6,000 speakers (according to Nguetse Mezatio Tsague in 2003) in the Eastern Region, in the communes of Diang and Belabo in Lom-et-Djerem department.
