= Kemezung language =

Bantoid language spoken in Cameroon

Kemezung
- Native to: Cameroon
- Region: Northwest Province, Donga-Mantung Division, Southwest corner of Ako Subdivision, Northwest of Nkambé, town of Dumbu and village of Kwei.
- Native speakers: 3,540 (2008)
- Language family: Niger–Congo?: Atlantic–Congo; Benue–Congo; Southern Bantoid; Eastern Beboid; Kemezung

Language codes
- ISO 639-3: dmo
- Glottolog: keme1240

Kemezung (Dumbo, Dumbu, Dzumbo, Kumaju) is a Southern Bantoid (Eastern Beboid) language of Cameroon. According to Ethnologue, it's 85% lexically similar to Bebe.

== Consonants ==
Kemezung has 19 "unmodified" consonants. Cox also claims Kemezung has labialized, palatalized, and prenasalized consonants but does not list all of them.

		Labial	Coronal	Palatal	Velar	Labial–velar	Glottalic
Plosive	voiceless		t		k	k͡p	
Plosive	voiced	b	d		g	g͡b	
Affricate	voiceless		t͡s (Note: /t͡s/ becomes [t͡ʃ] before /i/.)				
Affricate	voiced		d͡z (Note: /d͡z/ becomes [d͡ʒ] before /i/.)				
Fricative		f	s (Note: /s/ becomes [ʃ] before /i/. It becomes [s̬] or [ɾ] between vowels root-medially.)				h
Nasal		m	n	ɲ	ŋ		
Approximant			l (Note: /l/ optionally becomes [d] in many words before /i/ root-medially.)	j (Note: /j/ optionally becomes [ʒ] before /i/ root-medially.)		w	

== Vowels ==
Kemezung has 9 phonemic vowels.

	Front	Central	Back
Close	i		u
Close-mid	e	ɘ (Note: Cox uses ⟨ɨ⟩, which normally represents the close central unrounded vowel /ɨ/.)	o
Open-mid	ɛ	ɜ (Note: Cox uses ⟨ə⟩, which normally represents the mid central unrounded vowel /ə/.)	ɔ
Open		ä	

== Tone ==
Kemezung also has 7 (or possibly 8) tones. There are three level tones (high, mid, and low), three falling tones (high-low, mid-low, and long mid-low), and one or two rising tones (low-mid and possibly mid-high).
