= Pam language =

Mbum language of northern Cameroon

Pam
- Native to: Cameroon
- Native speakers: 30 (2003)
- Language family: Niger–Congo?: Atlantic–Congo; Mbum–Day; Mbum; (unclassified); Pam

Language codes
- ISO 639-3: pmn
- Glottolog: pamm1242
- ELP: Pam

Pam is a nearly extinct, unclassified Mbum language of northern Cameroon. There are only about 30 speakers remaining in the vicinity of Tcholliré (Tcholliré commune, Mayo-Rey department, Northern Region).
