= Ngoshie language =

Bantoid language spoken in Cameroon

Ngoshie
- Native to: Cameroon
- Native speakers: 9,200 (2001)
- Language family: Niger–Congo?: Atlantic–Congo; Benue–Congo; Southern Bantoid; Momo; Ngoshie

Language codes
- ISO 639-3: nsh
- Glottolog: ngos1238

Ngoshie is a Southern Bantoid language of Cameroon.
