= Amasi language =

Southern Bantoid language of Cameroon

Amasi
- Native to: Cameroon
- Language family: Niger–Congo?: Atlantic–Congo; Benue–Congo; Southern Bantoid; Momo; Amasi

Language codes
- ISO 639-3: None (mis)
- Linguist List: 0gn
- Glottolog: None

Amasi is a Southern Bantoid language of Cameroon.

The language has no ISO code, as it had been thought a dialect of Manta, a Southwest Grassfields (Western Momo) language.
