= Missong language =

Southern Bantoid language of the Lower Fungom region of Cameroon

Missong
- Native to: Cameroon
- Region: Lower Fungom
- Native speakers: 400 (2012)
- Language family: Niger–Congo?: Atlantic–Congo; Benue–Congo; Southern Bantoid; Western Beboid (geographic); Mungbam–Missong; Missong

Language codes
- ISO 639-3: None (mis)
- Glottolog: None

Missong is a Southern Bantoid language of the Lower Fungom region of Cameroon, spoken in the village of Missong. It is closely related to Mungbam. There are around 400 speakers.
