= Bebele language =

Bantu language spoken in Cameroon

Bebele
- Region: Cameroon
- Native speakers: (24,000 cited 1971)
- Language family: Niger–Congo?: Atlantic–Congo; Benue–Congo; Southern Bantoid; Bantu (Zone A); Beti; Bebele

Language codes
- ISO 639-3: beb
- Glottolog: bebe1248
- Guthrie code: A.73a

Bebele (Bamvele, Bëbëlë) is a Bantu language of Cameroon. It is mutually intelligible with other Beti dialects such as Ewondo and Fang.

== Varieties ==
The Bémbélé group includes all the neighboring languages that claim to belong to the Eki group. These are Bebele (Bembélé), Yasám, Yekaba, Yesamba, Bajia, Bafék, and Yanavok.

Bémbélé covers, along with Bébélé (Bamvele), Yébaka, Yesamba, and Bajia, the entire part of Haute Sanaga department, located south of the Sanaga River (in the communes of Minta, Nanga-Ebogo, Bibé, and Nsem). Meanwhile, the "Feuk", Yangavék (Yangafeuk), and Bafék (Bafeuk) are located north of the Sanaga River (in Ntui commune), and the Yasém (Asem) are confined to the village of Yassem at the northern end of the commune of Ngoro (department of Mbam-et-Kim). Bémbélé also extends into the Eastern Region in the departments of Lom-et-Djerem (Diang commune) and Haut-Nyong (Nguélémendouka commune).

They are estimated at 56,200 speakers (Djomeni 2004).
