= Bebe language =

Southern Bantu language of Cameroon

Bebe
- Naami
- Yi Be Wu
- Region: Cameroon
- Native speakers: 3,600 (2008)
- Language family: Niger–Congo?: Atlantic–Congo; Benue–Congo; Southern Bantoid; Eastern Beboid; Bebe

Language codes
- ISO 639-3: bzv
- Glottolog: bebe1250

Bebe, or Naami, is an Eastern Beboid language of Cameroon. According to Ethnologue, it's 85% lexically similar to Kemezung.
