= Bangandu language =

Savannas language spoken in Cameroon

Bangandu
- Ngombe
- Native to: Cameroon
- Native speakers: (2,700 Bangandu cited 1977); 12,000 Ngombe (2010 census)
- Language family: Niger–Congo?: Atlantic–Congo; Savannas; Gbaya; Southern; Bangandu

Language codes
- ISO 639-3: Either: bgf – Bangandu nmj – Nombe
- Glottolog: bang1347 Ngombe-Bangandu ngom1265 (extensive bibliography)
- ELP: Bangandu; Ngombe

Bangando and Ngombe constitute a Gbaya language of Cameroon and CAR.

There are two populations: Bangando proper (Bàngàndò), in Cameroon, and Ngombe (Ba(n)gando-Ngombe, Ngombe-Kaka) clustered around Mambéré-Kadéï Prefecture across the border in the Central African Republic. There are several populations called Ngombe, and it is not clear to which the spurious ISO code for Ngombe belongs. On a global scale, Bangando is considered to be a threatened language with approximately anywhere between 2,700-3,500 speakers. Language status levels can be derived from the Ethnologue Expanded Graded Intergenerational Disruption Scale.

== Distribution ==
Bangandu is spoken at the southern end of Boumba-et-Ngoko department (Eastern Region) in the commune of Moloundou, along the road from the main town of Moloundou to Lokomo. Bangandu is also spoken in Congo. In both Cameroon and Congo, there are about 2,700 speakers total (Voegelin & Voegelin 1977). (Bangandu, called Bangantou by the local government, should not be confused with Bageto, also called Bananto, which is a Mpo dialect.)

A very similar variety, Ngombe, is spoken in the Central African Republic between Gamboula (on the Cameroonian border) and Berbérati.

== Sociolinguistic situation ==
Speakers of Bangando tend to be localized around regions of Southern Cameroon. The language of Bangando is classified as a field dependent and relies on a specific level of field dependence in order to be learned, according to authors J.W. Berry, S.H Irvine and E.G. Hunt in their book Indigenous Cognition: Functioning in Cultural Context. Field dependent language learning involves the complete envelopment of an individual into the community of which the language is spoken. Authors J.W. Berry, S.H Irvine and E.G. Hunt further develop upon the lack of education indigenous speakers receive in order to thrive outside of the Bangando community. This aspect of the Bangando community could be indirectly linked to the exclusivity of the Bangando language. Multiple accounts of Bangando speakers, including an account written by author Victor Barnouw found in journal American Anthropologist tend to depict indigenous speakers as agriculturalists and gatherers.
