= Giziga language =

Giziga language may refer to the following languages of northern Cameroon.

- North Giziga language
- South Giziga language
