= Beezen language =

Plateau language of Cameroon

Beezen
- Native to: Cameroon
- Region: Taraba State
- Native speakers: (450 cited 2001)
- Language family: Niger–Congo?: Atlantic–Congo; Benue–Congo; Plateau; Yukubenic; Akum–Beezen; Beezen

Language codes
- ISO 639-3: bnz
- Glottolog: beez1238
- ELP: Beezen

Beezen (Bèèzen, Bɛɛzɛn) is a Plateau language of Cameroon.
