= Ngwo language =

Southern Bantoid language of Cameroon

Ngwo
- Ngwɔ
- Pronunciation: ŋɡwɔ
- Region: Cameroon
- Native speakers: 22,000 (2004)
- Language family: Niger–Congo?: Atlantic–Congo; Benue–Congo; Southern Bantoid; Momo; Ngwo
- Dialects: Konda; Basa
- Writing system: Latin

Language codes
- ISO 639-3: ngn
- Glottolog: ngwo1241

Ngwo (Ngwɔ) is a Southern Bantoid language of Cameroon. The Konda and Basa varieties are perhaps divergent enough to be considered distinct languages.
