= Gawar language =

Afro-Asiatic language spoken in Cameroon

Gavar
- Kortchi
- Native to: Cameroon
- Region: Far North Region, Cameroon
- Native speakers: 15,000 (2010)
- Language family: Afro-Asiatic: Chadic; Biu–Mandara; Daba (A.7); North; Gavar

Language codes
- ISO 639-3: gou
- Glottolog: gava1241

Gavar (also known as Gawar, Gouwar, Gauar, Rtchi, Kortchi, Ma-Gavar) is an Afro-Asiatic language spoken in Cameroon in the Far North Region.

Gavar is spoken most of Gavar canton, through which the Mayo-Gawar River flows, and in Gadala in the southeast of Mokolo commune (Mayo-Tsanaga Department, Far North Region).
