= Noni language =

Niger–Congo language of Cameroon

Noni
- Region: Cameroon
- Native speakers: 50,000 (2005–2008)
- Language family: Niger–Congo?: Atlantic–Congo; Benue–Congo; Southern Bantoid; Eastern Beboid; Noni; Noni
- Dialects: Noone; Ncane; Mungong
- Writing system: Latin

Language codes
- ISO 639-3: Either: nhu – Noone ncr – Ncane
- Glottolog: noon1243 Noone ncan1245 Ncane-Mungong

The Noni language, also called Noone, is an Eastern Beboid language of the Niger–Congo family in Cameroon. The Noone, Ncane, and Mungong varieties are sometimes considered three distinct Noni languages. Ethnologue reports that Ncare is 88% lexically similar to Noone, and 84% with Saari (Nsari).

Noni is the native language to 40,000 people in the country, particularly in the North West Province, the Bui Division and the northwest Kumbo Subdivision. Noone proper was used as the secret language in Indiana Jones.

== Relevant literature ==
- Boutwell, Richard. 2020. A grammar of Nchane: A Bantoid (Beboid) language of Cameroon. University of Leiden: PhD dissertation.
- Hyman, Larry M. 1980. Noni (Misaje group). L’expansion bantou. Paris: SELAF (no. special 9), 259–274.
- Hyman, Larry M. 1981. Noni grammatical structure, with special reference to verb morphology. Southern California: Occasional Papers in Linguistics 9. Los Angeles: University of Southern California.
- Lux, David 2003. Noni provisional lexicon. ms. Yaoundé: SIL
- Richards, Russell M. 1991. Phonologie de trois langues beboides du Cameroun: Noone, Ncanti et Sari. Thèse pour le doctorat (Arrête du 23 Novembre 1988), Livres I. et II. Université de la Sorbonne Nouvelle Paris III.
