= Mofu-Gudur language =

Chadic language of northern Cameroon

Mofu-Gudur
- Native to: Cameroon
- Region: Far North Province
- Native speakers: 90,000 (2008)
- Language family: Afro-Asiatic: Chadic; South (c); Mofu-Gudur
- Signed forms: Mofu-Gudur Sign Language

Language codes
- ISO 639-3: mif
- Glottolog: mofu1248 Mofu-Gudur mofu1251 Mofu-Gudur Sign Language

Mofu-Gudur, or South Mofu, is a Chadic language spoken in northern Cameroon. Dialects are Dimeo, Gudur, Massagal, Mokong, Njeleng, and Zidim.

Mofu-Gudur is spoken in the massifs south of the Tsanaga River as far as Mayo-Louti (Mokong and Mofou cantons of Mokolo commune, Mayo-Tsanaga department, and Gawaza commune, Diamaré department, in the Far North Region) by 60,000 speakers.

== Sign language ==
Mofu-Gudur speakers, who are predominantly hearing, use an extensive repertoire of conventionalized gestures, estimated at around 1,500. These gestures accompany storytelling (including history) and may be used in situations where speech is impractical.
