= Njen language =

Southern Bantoid language of Cameroon

Njen
- Native to: Cameroon
- Native speakers: 1,800 (2002)
- Language family: Niger–Congo?: Atlantic–Congo; Benue–Congo; Southern Bantoid; Momo; Njen

Language codes
- ISO 639-3: njj
- Glottolog: njen1238

Njen is a minor Southern Bantoid language of Cameroon, spoken by the residents of the village of Njen. Many Njen residents also speak Moghamo and Ashong, the dialects of neighboring villages.
