= Saari language =

Eastern Beboid language of Cameroon

Saari
- Nsari
- Region: Cameroon
- Native speakers: 7,600 (2008)
- Language family: Niger–Congo?: Atlantic–Congo; Benue–Congo; Southern Bantoid; Eastern Beboid; Saari

Language codes
- ISO 639-3: asj
- Glottolog: nsar1238

Saari, or Nsari, is an Eastern Beboid language of Cameroon. According to Ethnologue, it's 84% lexically similar to Ncane, making it very close to the Noni cluster. It is spoken in the Misaje Sub-Division, Donga-Mantung Division, North West Region. The Ethnologue has Sari as the language name, and lists the following as alternate language names: Akweto, Nsari, Pesaa, Saari, Sali.

The language is spoken by the Besaa people, who live predominately in Akweto, Kamine, and Mbissa. There are approximately 7,600 (Lewis, 2015) speakers of the language, although the exact number is unknown as there are reportedly sizable clusters of people living outside the area, particularly in the Southwest Region.

== Sources ==
- Blench, Roger, 2011. 'The membership and internal structure of Bantoid and the border with Bantu'. Bantu IV, Humboldt University, Berlin.
- Richards, Russell M. 1991. Phonologie de trois langues beboides du Cameroun: Noone, Ncanti et Sari. Thèse pour le doctorat (Arrête du 23 Novembre 1988), Livres I. et II. Université de la Sorbonne Nouvelle Paris III.
- Saari Dictionary
