= Wandala language =

Afro-Asiatic language spoken in Cameroon and Nigeria

Wandala
- Mandara
- Native to: Cameroon, Nigeria
- Region: Borno State
- Native speakers: (44,000 cited 1982–1993)
- Language family: Afro-Asiatic: Chadic; Biu–Mandara; Wandala–Mafa; Wandala languages (A.4); East; Wandala

Language codes
- ISO 639-3: mfi
- Glottolog: wand1278

Wandala, also known as Mandara or Mura', is a language in the Chadic branch of the Afro-Asiatic language family, spoken in Cameroon and Nigeria.

== Geographic distribution ==
Wandala has 23,500 speakers in Northern Cameroon and 20,000 speakers in Nigeria.

In Cameroon, Wandala is spoken in Mora and surroundings (in the Mora massif and surrounding plains) by about 23,500 speakers. It is also the lingua franca of the entire department of Mayo-Sava, by ethnic groups of the northern Mandara Mountains.

== Dialects ==
The Mura dialect represents an archaic form of the Wandala language. It is the language of the non-Islamic "Kirdi-Mora" people who live in the Mora massif.

The Malgwa dialect is distinct. It is spoken in the plain north of Mora (in Kolofata district) by a mixture of Kanuri, Fula, and Arab populations.

== Phonology ==
=== Consonants ===
Wandala has a rich consonant inventory, with more than forty consonantal segments.

		Labial	Alveolar	Palatal	Velar	Labio-velar	Glottal
Plosive	voiceless	p pʲ	t		k kʲ	k͡p	
Plosive	voiced	b (bʲ)	d dʲ		g gʲ	gʷ	
Plosive	prenasalized	ᵐb	ⁿd		ᵑg		
Plosive	glottalized	ɓ (ɓʲ)	ɗ ɗʲ		ɠʲ		
Affricate	voiceless		t͡s	t͡ʃ			
Affricate	voiced		d͡z	d͡ʒ			
Fricative	voiceless	f (fʲ)	s ɬ (ɬʲ)	ʃ	(x)		h
Fricative	voiced	v	z ɮ (ɮʲ)	ʒ	(ɣ)		
Nasal		m	n	ɲ	ŋ		
Approximant			l (lʲ) r rʲ	j jˀ		w	

Sounds in parentheses are allophones. The glottalized plosives are voiceless.

=== Vowels ===
Wandala has been reported to have no phonemic vowels. An alternative analysis posits three underlying and six phonetic vowels, as well as two underlying tones.

	Front	Central	Back
Close	i		u
Mid	(e)	(ə)	(o)
Open		a	

=== Syllable structure ===
Some possible syllable structures are V, N (nasal consonant), CV, Glide V, VC, CVC. Consonant clusters are not permitted in the coda. To avoid breaking this constraint, a central vowel may be inserted in word-final position. The consonant r may act as a syllabic peak, meaning the structure Cr is a possible syllable structure.

== Grammar ==
=== Lexical categories ===
Wandala has the lexical categories of noun, verb, adjective, adverb, and predicator.

=== Morphology ===
Reduplication is a major morphological process in Wandala, with different forms and functions that may be limited to one lexical category or shared across lexical categories. Partial reduplication gives the plural form of verbs and adjectives, while complete reduplication gives aspectual and modal forms of verbs, or derives adverbs from other lexical categories. Phrases can also be reduplicated.

All lexical categories can have suffixes. On verbs, suffixes have many functions, such as marking semantic and grammatical relations, directionality and point of view. Suffixes on nouns mark plural number, genitive relation and pronominal possession. Nouns can be derived by adding suffixes to numerals and adjectives.

Wandala also has limited prefixes for nouns and one infix. The vowel a acts as an infix in the verbal system to encode verb plurality.

=== Syntax ===
In the noun phrase, the head precedes modifiers, determiners and quantifiers.

The grammatical relations subject and object are distinguished, with distinct pronouns. However, lexical properties of verbs determine how the grammatical roles of nominal arguments are coded, with some verbs taking the controller as the unmarked argument, and others the affected entity.

A nominal object or nominal subject can occur after the verb, but cannot both occupy this position, so if they co-occur, one must be fronted. This encodes information structure such as topicalization, focus or switch-reference.
