= Yamba language =

Eastern Grassfields language of Cameroon and Nigeria

Yamba
- Region: Cameroon, Nigeria
- Ethnicity: Yamba
- Native speakers: (80,000 in Cameroon cited 2000)
- Language family: Niger–Congo?: Atlantic–Congo; Benue–Congo; Southern Bantoid; Grassfields; Eastern; Mantungland; Yamba
- Dialects: Mbem; Ntem; Mfe; Nkot; Ntong; Kwak

Language codes
- ISO 639-3: yam
- Glottolog: yamb1251

Yamba is a Grassfields language of the Northwest region of southern Cameroon, with a small number of speakers in Eastern Nigeria. Mbem village has the largest population of Yamba speakers in the region.
