= Grassfields languages =

Branch of Southern Bantoid of western Cameroon and part of Nigeria

Grassfields
- Wide Grassfields
- Geographic distribution: Western High Plateau of Cameroon and Taraba state of Nigeria
- Linguistic classification: Niger–Congo?: Atlantic–Congo; Volta–Congo; Benue–Congo; Bantoid; Southern Bantoid; Grassfields
- Proto-language: Proto-Grassfields
- Subdivisions: Narrow Grassfields; Ambele; Menchum

Language codes
- Glottolog: wide1239
- Clickable map of the Grassfields languages and their subfamilies in western Cameroon

The Grassfields languages (or Wide Grassfields languages) are a branch of the Southern Bantoid languages spoken in the Western High Plateau of Cameroon and some parts of Taraba state, Nigeria. Better known Grassfields languages include the Eastern Grassfields languages, Bamun, Yamba, Bali, and Bafut and the Ring languages, Kom, Nso, and Oku. Almost all of these languages are closely related, sharing approximately half of their vocabulary.

== Classifications ==
The Grassfields languages were previously known as Grassfields Bantu and Semi-Bantu. They are sometimes classified on two levels, Wide Grassfields, which includes all the languages, and Narrow Grassfields, which excludes Menchum, Ambele and sometimes the Southwest Grassfields languages. These may form a group of their own, which Nurse (2003) calls Peripheral Grassfields but rejects.

Blench (2010) notes there is little evidence for the traditional assumption that the non-Western Momo languages belong in Grassfields and that they may actually be closer to the poorly established Tivoid group; Western Momo is therefore renamed Southwest Grassfields to avoid confusion, and only Menchum and Ambele are left out of Narrow Grassfields. The classification of Ambele is unclear, though it is clearly divergent, and Menchum may be closer to the Tivoid languages (Blench 2011). Blench (2012) suggests that Western Beboid may belong in Grassfields. Blench (2010b) adds Momo as a Narrow Grassfields subgroup.

- Grassfields
  - Narrow Grassfields
    - Ring (Ring Road)
    - Eastern Grassfields (Mbam–Nkam)
    - Momo
    - ? Ndemli
    - Southwest Grassfields (previously Western Momo)
  - ? Ambele
  - ? Menchum (Befang)
  - ? Western Beboid

Viti (Vötö) is unclassified Narrow Grassfields.

The Eastern Grassfields languages share nasal noun-class prefixes with the Bantu languages, which are not found in the other branches of Grassfields. However, they appear to be more closely related to the rest of Grassfields than they are to Bantu.

== Names and locations (Nigeria) ==
Below is a list of Grassfields language names, populations, and locations (in Nigeria only) from Blench (2019).

Language	Cluster	Alternate spellings	Own name for language	Endonym(s)	Other names (location-based)	Other names for language	Exonym(s)	Speakers	Location(s)
Yamba				Yamba		Mbem	Kaka (not recommended)	few in Nigeria; 25,000 in Cameroon (1982 SIL)	Taraba State, Sardauna, Gashaka LGAs, Antere and other border villages; mainly spoken in Cameroon
LamNsọ		Lam–Nsaw, Lam–Nsọ	Lam–Nsọ’	Nsọ, Nsaw				125,000 in Cameroon (1987 SIL)	Taraba State, Sarduana LGA, at Gembu and nearby towns; Takum LGA at Manya; mainly spoken in Cameroon
Limbum			Limbum	Wimbum				few in Nigeria; 73,000 in Cameroon (1982 SIL)	Taraba State, Sardauna LGA, Mambila uplands, mainly in Cameroon
Dzodinka					Adiri, Adere				Taraba State, Sardauna LGA; also in Cameroon: a single village on the border

== See also ==
- List of Proto-Grassfields reconstructions (Wiktionary)
