= Eastern Grassfields languages =

Grassfields language branch of Cameroon

Eastern Grassfields
- Mbam–Nkam
- Geographic distribution: Cameroon
- Linguistic classification: Niger–Congo?: Atlantic–Congo; Volta–Congo; Benue–Congo; Bantoid; Bantoid; Grassfields; Narrow Grassfields; Eastern Grassfields
- Subdivisions: Bamileke; Ngemba; Nkambe; Nun

Language codes
- Glottolog: mbam1249

The Eastern Grassfields languages, spoken in the Western High Plateau of Cameroon, are a branch of the Grassfields languages including Bamun, Yamba and Bamileke.

The Eastern Grassfield languages have nasal prefixes, while Western Grassfield languages have only "remnants of nasal prefixes". These Grassfield Bantu (GB) languages share about a 41 to 60 percent lexical similarities.

There are four or five branches to the family:

- Nkambe languages (north)
- Mbam–Nkam (south)
  - Ngemba languages
  - Bamileke languages
  - Nun languages

Nurse (2003) reports that Bamileke might be two branches.
