= Topoke people =

Topoke
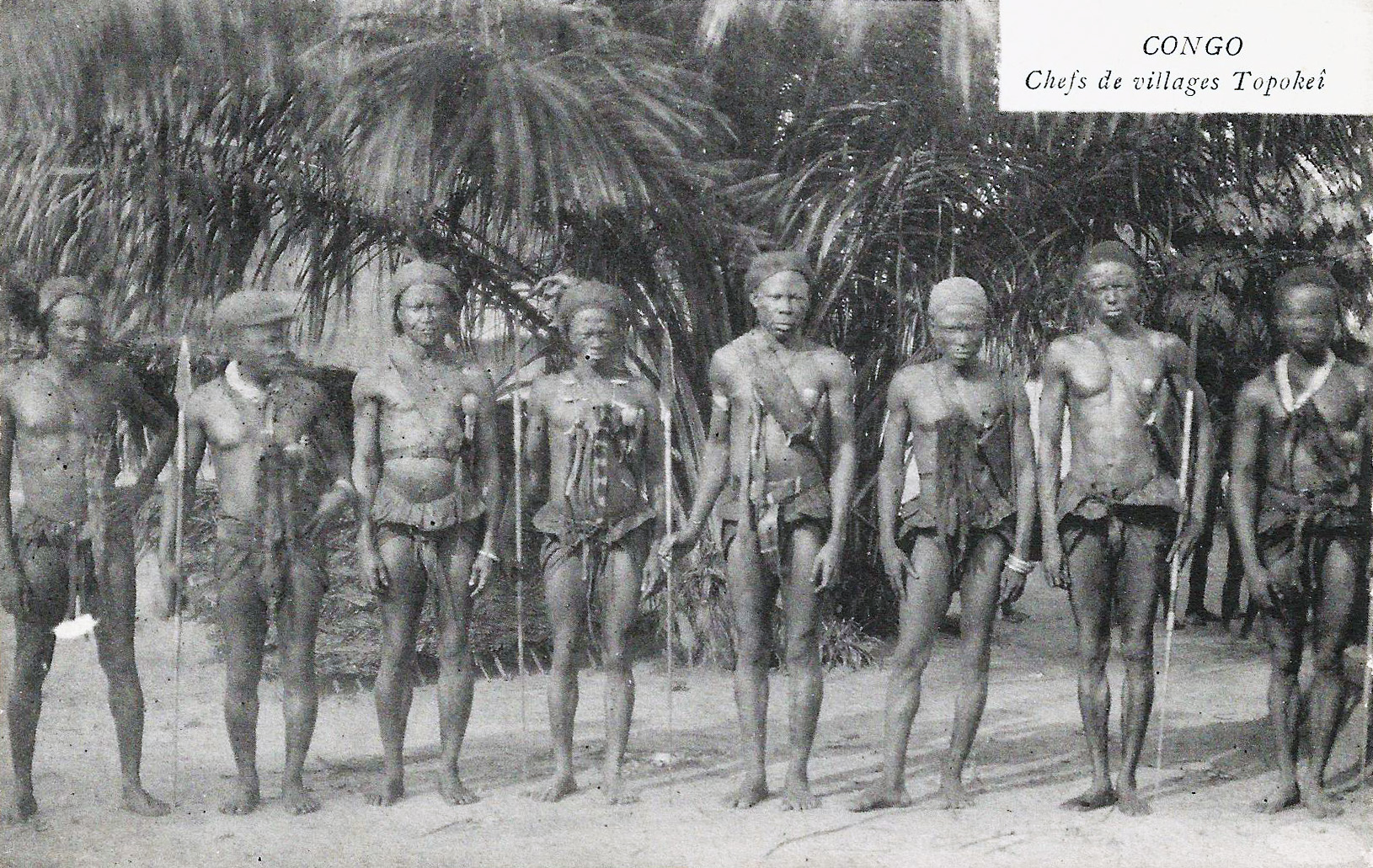
- Chiefs of the Topoke villages (early 20th century)

Regions with significant populations
- Tshopo, Democratic Republic of the Congo: 128,613
- Ikela, Democratic Republic of the Congo: 29,413

Languages
- Poke language, Kiswahili, Lingala

Related ethnic groups
- Mongo, Anamongo

The Topoke (initially called Eso) are an ethnic group that mainly live in the Isangi Territory south of the Congo River, downstream from Kisangani in the Tshopo Province of the Democratic Republic of the Congo. They speak the Poke language (also called Puki, Tofoke, Topoke or Tovoke), in the Soko–Kele languages group of Bantu languages.

== Location ==
The Topoke are one of the three main ethnic groups in the Isangi territory. The other two are the Lokele and Turumbu.

Their main territory is between 0° and 2° South, 23° and 25° East. The heart of the territory is in the angle formed by the Congo and Lomami rivers. Ilambi is one of their communities. They are also present in the Bafwasende sector.

Another group of Topoke people is located in the Yalikandja-Yanonge sector. This group, commonly known as the "Topoke of Likolo" is due to population movements caused by the penetration of Arab slavers into the region. The Ikela sector in Tshuapa is also hosted by Topoke people who came from Isangi, and make up 10% of the population. They are also noticed in Kwamouth due to recent migration.

The Topoke may have originated to the north of the Congo River, in the Ubangi-Uele basin. They would have abandoned this territory when threatened by hordes of Baboa and, or Zande people. During their march to the south, they drove out, assimilated and displaced many tribes. Finally, they would have first settled on the right bank of the Congo River around the lower Aruwimi. From there they crossed the river to settle in their current territory, having driven the original Bangando and Bambole inhabitants further south.

There are cultural affinities between the Topoke and the Mongandu and Bambole people.

According to the 1984 census, the Topoke accounted for 52.38% (128,613 out of 245,548 total inhabitants) of the population of the Isangi area.

== Pre-colonial culture ==
Music and dance played important roles in Topoke culture, and music in particular reached a high level of sophistication.

The Topoke people had a long tradition of large regional markets, where purchases could be made on credit or by using iron javelins as currency. Non-payment of debts periodically led to fighting, in which the javelins were used as weapons. The lances were called liganda, loganda or ndoa by some Topoke, the Lokele word for marriage. Thirty of them would buy a male slave, while forty or more would be needed for a female.

The Topoke, alongside Akela or Kela people, also used to send signals, throughout the region, with wooden gongs. They were made in cylindrical shape with a hollowed-out tree trunk.

The Topoke were polygynous, and it was common for an important visitor to be offered female companionship as well as food and shelter. This practice persisted well into the colonial era. However, sometimes sexual abuse of Topoke women by colonial administrators led to retaliation, such as killings of white European officers or poisoning by the men of the village.

== Colonial era and later ==
The Topoke caused a lot of trouble to European colonial forces, due to their bellicosity. They were isolated and rarely approached by Europeans, as they were ultimately killed trying to enter Topoke land.

The Lomami Company was formed in 1898, and in 1899, started forcing the local people to harvest rubber. Beginning in the 1900s, many Topoke men started working for the company but still refused to soften up, thereby causing a lot of trouble and rebellions amongst workers.

In 1902, Knud Jespersen, a civil servant of the Congo Free State, founded the Bondombe Station in Tshuapa. He was welcomed by a local chief, as he was seeking protection from the Topoke, known as « the terrors » of the Lomami region, and Tetela raids, saying « just by the sight of them makes us shiver like antelopes ». Jespersen ignored his concerns and decided to sign a deal with the Topoke, and posted notices close the station as a counterweight.

In 1905, two white officers of the company were killed by warriors of Yaboila. Mr. Pimpurnaux, former District Commissioner of Aruwimi, led punitive expeditions. One of the Topoke men accused of the murder was hanged at Basoko in November 1905.

Some Topoke families in the Mongo block at Bondombe, in the Tshuapa basin on the equator, are descended from Topoke who fled the 1905 expeditions.

Resistance to work as rubber harvesters was widespread, with the men retreating to hiding places in the marshes to avoid being forcibly recruited for work that they equated with slavery during the period of Arab occupation.

The Topoke were relatively isolated from missionary activity and wage earning until the 1930s. After World War II they began to move to Kisangani to work as unskilled laborers, but were at a disadvantage compared to more established urban groups. However, by 1975 many had become businessmen, intellectuals and university students.

== Sources ==
- Burgess, Robert G. (1982). Field research: a sourcebook and field manual. Routledge. p. 62. ISBN 0-415-07893-8.
- Boingaoli, Bilusa Baila (1993). "Recherche sur l'identité ethnique du peuple Topoke (haut-zaire)". Civilizations. 41. ISSN 2032-0442. JSTOR 41229825.
- Ethnologue. "Poke". Ethnologue.
- Heritage Auction Galleries (2007). Important African and Oceanic art auction. Heritage Capital Corporation. ISBN 978-1-59967-152-9.
- Hunt, Nancy Rose (1999). A colonial lexicon of birth ritual, medicalization, and mobility in the Congo. Duke University Press. ISBN 0-8223-2366-4.
- Likaka, Osumaka (2009). Naming colonialism: history and collective memory in the Congo, 1870-1960. University of Wisconsin Press. ISBN 978-0-299-23364-8.
- MacGaffey, Janet (1987). Entrepreneurs and parasites: the struggle for indigenous capitalism in Zaire. CUP Archive. ISBN 0-521-33533-7.
- "The Topoke People of the Congo". Billboard. Vol. 71, no. 18. 13 April 1959. p. 40. ISSN 0006-2510.
