= Yalemba =

- Donald Dron and William Kirby outside last surviving fetish temple. Yalemba, Congo, c 1902.

- Location within Democratic Republic of the Congo
- Coordinates: 1.10852°N 23.802567°E
- Country: DR Congo
- Province: Tshopo
- Territory: Basoko
- Time zone: UTC+2 (CAT)
- Climate: Af
- National language: Lingala

Yalemba was a mission of the Baptist Missionary Society (BMS) in the Democratic Republic of the Congo, lying on the north bank of the Congo River between Basoko and Yangambi.

The mission was established a short distance downstream from Yabibi River. The early missionaries planted coconut palms which were still standing in 2009. The BMS was at first granted the right to run the mission only during the life of George Grenfell, the BMS leader in the Congo. The government gave this right as a personal favour to Grenfell due to his friendly attitude to the authorities and the assistance that he had given them in the past. Eventually the BMS was able to obtain a 20-year lease in October 1905. The missionaries found they had to deal with local people who spoke eight or nine different languages.

Grenfell died in 1906, and the BMS started to allow their missionaries to be openly critical of the Belgian regime. In 1908 the missionary W.R. Kirby was stationed at Yalemba. In January of that year he made a tour of the country on the other bank of the river, and a summary of his findings was published in the London Times on 18 June 1908. He made serious accusations that the head of the post at Lingomo was forcing the local people to harvest rubber, burning the villages of those who resisted, destroying their crops of bananas and manioc and taking men, women and children into captivity.

John F. Carrington was Director of the Teachers' College in Yalemba, known as the Grenfell Institute. He supervised translation of the New Testament into the Lokele language. Carrington was the first European to learn drum language, used by the local Kele people to quickly communicate over long distances. At Yalemba he found two drum languages, corresponding to the Heso language of the Basoko people and the Topoke language of the Baonga villagers on the other side of the Congo. However, when he arrived in 1951 he found that out of 200 boys at the school only 20 could drum. Carrington said "The boys now say, 'We want to read and write,' and laugh at the drum".

== Sources ==
- The Bible translator, Volumes 7-8. United Bible Societies. 1956.
- Marchal, Jules; Delathuy, A. M. (1996). E.D. Morel contre Léopold II. Editions L'Harmattan. ISBN 2-7384-2856-8.
- Shenker, Israel (1974). Words and their masters. Doubleday.
- Smith, Edwin William (1929). The shrine of a people's soul. Edinburgh House Press.
- Vinck, Honoré (1954). "Un livre de lecture française du Congo Belge".
- "yabibi-rive - 2008". Panoramia.
