= Ilambi =

- Location within Democratic Republic of the Congo
- Coordinates: 0.6394°N 24.1838°E
- Country: Democratic Republic of Congo
- Province: Tshopo

Ilambi is a community in the Tshopo Province of the Democratic Republic of the Congo, on the Lomami River. It is 20 kilometres (12 mi) to the south of the point where the Lomani enters the Congo River. Most of the inhabitants are Topoke people.

== Colonial era ==
In the colonial era, the Lomami Company forced the people of the Lomami River region from Opala and Lokilo down to Ilambi to collect large amounts of rubber. The Mbole people vividly described their view of the effect of this work with the phrase wando wo limolo, meaning "tax-caused loss of weight". A 1903 account by a British traveler noted that the company was doing a large trade in rubber and ivory. It went on: "The natives are quite satisfied, work well and give very little trouble, although it is necessary to punish them sometimes, and as usual, the prisoners on the chain are given work to do outside the prison".
