= Mbole =

Mbole may refer to:

- the Mbole people
- the Mbole–Enya languages
  - the Mbole language
