= Lombo language =

Bantu language spoken in DR Congo

Lombo
- Native to: Democratic Republic of the Congo
- Region: Isangi
- Ethnicity: Turumbu people
- Native speakers: (10,000 cited 1971)
- Language family: Niger–Congo?: Atlantic–Congo; Benue–Congo; Bantoid; Bantu (Zone C); Soko–Kele (C.50–60); Lombo

Language codes
- ISO 639-3: loo
- Glottolog: lomb1260
- Guthrie code: C.54

The Lombo language (also called Olombo, Turumbu, Ulumbu) is in the Kele language group of Bantu languages. It is spoken by the Turumbu people of the Tshopo District, Isangi Territory, in the Democratic Republic of the Congo.
