= Ngando =

Ngando may refer to:

- Ngando people, Bantu subsistence farmers who live in eastern part of Équateur and the western part of Orientale province in the Democratic Republic of the Congo
- Ngando language, a Bantu language in the Soko-Kele languages group that is spoken by the Ngando people in the Democratic Republic of the Congo
- Ngando language (Central African Republic), a Bantu macrolanguage of the Central African Republic

== People with the name ==
- Axel Ngando (born 1993), French footballer of Cameroonian descent
- Ngando Pickett or Henry Mouyebe, Cameroonian football fan
