= Yaboila =

- Location within Democratic Republic of the Congo
- Coordinates: 0.56667°N 23.96667°E
- Country: DR Congo
- Province: Tshopo
- Territory: Isangi
- Time zone: UTC+2 (Central Africa Time)
- National language: Lingala

Yaboila is a village in the Isangi Territory of the Democratic Republic of the Congo.

The Lomami Company was formed in 1898 and in 1899 started forcing the local people to harvest rubber. In 1905 two white officers of the Lomami Company were killed by warriors from Yaboila. Mr. Pimpurnaux, District Commissioner of Aruwimi, led punitive expeditions. One of the Topoke men accused of the murder was hung at Basoko in November 1905.
