= Turumbu people =

Ethnic group in the Democratic Republic of the Congo

Turumbu
Regions with significant populations
- Isangi Territory, Democratic Republic of the Congo: 36,000

Languages
- Lombo language

The Turumbu people (also Lombo, Olombo, Ulumbu) are a Bantu ethnic group living in the Democratic Republic of the Congo, mostly in the Isangi Territory of the Tshopo Province on both sides of the Congo River. They speak the Lombo language. As of 1971 their population was estimated to be 10,000. A more recent estimate put the population at 32,000.

== Location ==
The Turumbu territory lies in the Zairian Basin, an ecologically rich region with a wide variety of plants, animals and microorganisms. Average annual rainfall is 1,800 millimetres (71 in). There are two rainy seasons, one between March and May and the other between August and November. Average temperature is 25.5 °C (77.9 °F), with humidity around 90%. The soil is infertile, forcing farmers to slash and burn new plots each growing season.

== Economy ==
The farmers grow rice and maize as cash crops, and grow cassava and plantain for subsistence. They also hunt, fish and gather protein-based foods, manufacture alcoholic beverages and handicrafts and engage in petty trade. There are foreign-owned plantations in the region growing coffee, cocoa, rubber and palm oil, but these are shrinking. There is little interaction between the smallholders and the plantation workers.

Most of the Turumbu villages are within reach of the Congo River and the Isangi - Yangambi - Kisangani road. This road is unpaved, rarely used in the rainy season and difficult to use at all times of the year. Lokele traders travelling by canoe on the river distribute and market farm and non-farm products of the Turumbu. Turumbu farmers living along the road may have to walk up to 23 kilometres (14 mi) to reach a market im Yangambi or Lotokila. Another group living deeper in the forest brings their produce to a market near Weko twice weekly for sales to traders who have travelled the 42 kilometres (26 mi) from Yangambi.

== Culture ==
Almost all the Turumbu people practice Christianity. They are known for the enormous iron blades that are given as gifts to the family of a bride, often up to 5 feet (1.5 m) long and weighing as much as 4.5 pounds (2.0 kg).

== Sources ==
- Tshibaka, Tshikala B. (1992). Labor in the rural household economy of the Zairian basin. Intl Food Policy Res Inst. ISBN 0-89629-093-X.
