= John Carrington =

John Carrington may refer to:

- John Carrington (judge) (1847–1913), British jurist, Solicitor General of Barbados, Chief Justice of St Lucia and Tobago, Attorney General of British Guiana and Chief Justice of Hong Kong
- John F. Carrington (1914–1985), English missionary and expert on drum language
- John H. Carrington (1934–2017), Republican member of the North Carolina General Assembly
- John P. Carrington (1941–2022), Journalist and financier
