= John F. Carrington =

John F. Carrington (21 March 1914 – 24 December 1985) was an English missionary and Bible translator who spent a large part of his life in the Belgian Congo. He became fluent in the Kele language and in the related talking drum form of communication, and wrote a book titled The Talking Drums of Africa.

== Education and career ==
Carrington was born in Rushden, Northamptonshire in 1914, the son of a school master. He attended primary school in Rushden (1918–1925), Northampton School for Boys (1925–1932), and the University of Nottingham where he obtained a first in botany (1932–1935) and a teaching certificate (1936). He taught junior science and mathematics at Nottingham Boys' School (1936–1938).

In 1938, he felt called to offer his services as a missionary with the Baptist Missionary Society. He arrived in the Belgian Congo later that year. In 1940, he married Nora Fleming in Leopoldville; the couple spent their honeymoon in South Africa. They adopted a Zairean boy named Bolingo.

From 1938 to 1951 and from 1958 to 1961, Carrington was head of the boy's primary school in Yakusu, a major school run by the Baptist Missionary Society. From 1951 to 1958 and from 1961 to 1964, he was director of the secondary schools and ministers' training college known as the Grenfell Institute in Yalemba. In 1947, he gained his first doctorate from the University of London with a thesis on "A comparative study of some Central African gong languages", which later formed the basis of his book The Talking Drums of Africa.

Carrington was later a professor of botany, Ethnobotany and Linguistics (1965–1974), Dean of Students (1965–1968), and vice-president for Academic Affairs (1968–1969) at Kisangani University. In 1970 he obtained an MSc in botany from the University of Reading for his work on plant taxonomy. In retirement, he undertook a second doctoral study in botany at Imperial College London on "Timber utilization by Upper Zairean craftsmen". He also had a diploma in theology from Regent's Park College, where he took courses in Greek and Hebrew.

In 1975, he toured colleges and universities in the United States, speaking about talking drums and demonstrating the drum's capabilities on Southern TV. In 1979, in retirement, he became lay pastor of a small Baptist church at Bishopdown near Salisbury. He died on 24 December 1985, following a massive heart attack.

== Bible translation ==
Carrington supervised the translation of the New Testament into the Lokele language. He was on the translation committee for the Congo-Swahili New Testament (1944–1949). He participated in the translation of the Old Testament into Lingala (1954–1970) and published a Lingala grammar and dictionary. In addition to these languages, he also spoke Dutch, Welsh and had some knowledge of Kimanga.

== Honors ==
In 1968, the Royal African Society awarded Carrington its gold medal and elected him as a fellow. He was also a fellow of the Royal Anthropological Institute and the Linnaean Society. He was ethnomusicology adviser to the African music society. The Zairean government made him a Chevalier de l'Ordre National du Léopard. National Geographic described him as "a living legend among the Lokele". In 1954, Time magazine ran an article about Carrington's research on talking drums.

== Drum knowledge ==
Lokele, like most African languages, is a tone language, that is, one in which the musical pitch of the voice, in addition to consonants and vowels, contributes to distinguishing meaning. In Lokele drum language, the pitch of the drum mimics the tone patterns of the voice, so it would be impossible to learn the drum language without a thorough knowledge of the corresponding oral language.

Carrington was struck by the fact that although there were no telephones, everyone knew exactly when he would arrive at a village. He found that the local Kele people were communicating via drums. Each village had an expert drummer and everyone could understand the language.

Carrington was the first European to learn a drum language. He was so fluent in Lokele that an African interviewee said “He is not really European". Local people believed that although he was white, Carrington was actually a black man who had been reincarnated into a white family. Whenever Carrington made a mistake when translating or playing the drums, the African players would blame his white upbringing.

In Yalemba, Carrington found two more drum languages corresponding to the Heso language of the Basoko people and the Topoke language of the Baonga villagers on the other side of the Congo. However, he found that out of 200 boys at the school only 20 could drum. According to Carrington, "The boys now say, 'We want to read and write,' and laugh at the drum".

In 1949, Carrington published a book, The Talking Drums of Africa, which describes his time spent with the Lokele people. The book stresses the importance of obtaining adequate background information on the spoken language before the drum language can be taught since the speaker must be sufficiently fluent to communicate. It also covers drum translations, drum construction, and in which social situations drums were played, but it does not address the topics of speed, rhythm, and how a sentence should be ended, which many believe is a key concept in understanding drum language. The book also stresses that drum language is a dying art and that those closely associated with it should take pride in their native art. However, by the time the book was published, Kele drum language was already falling out of use; today it has become extinct. Nevertheless, Carrington's book remains one of the most authoritative statements on talking drums.

== Bibliography ==
- John F. Carrington (1944). The drum language of the Lokele tribe. UP.
- John F. Carrington (1947). The initiation language, Lokele tribe.
- John F. Carrington (1949). A comparative study of some Central African gong-languages. Falk, G. van Campenhout, successeur.
- John F. Carrington (1949). Talking drums of Africa. Carey Kingsgate Press.
- John F. Carrington; D. Ridley Chesterton; William A. Deans; Ella Spees; R. E. Harlow; Getrud Koppel; J. Grainger; Annie M. Cowell; Moses Penge; Simon Ambaume; Yosiya Butso (1955). Kitabu cha Zaburi. British and Foreign Bible Society.
- Malcolm Guthrie; John F. Carrington (1988). Lingala grammar and dictionary: English-Lingala, Lingala-English. Baptist Missionary Society.

== Sources ==
- Shenker, Israel (1974). Words and their masters. Doubleday.
