= Isangi Territory =

Isangi Wilaya ya Isangi (Swahili)
- Interactive map of Isangi
- Coordinates: 0.7852°N 24.4528°E
- Country: DR Congo
- Province: Tshopo

Area
  - Total: 15,770 km^{2} (6,090 sq mi)

Population (2020)
  - Total: 816,385
  - Density: 51.77/km^{2} (134.1/sq mi)
- Time zone: UTC+2 (CAT)
- National language: Lingala
- Climate: Af

Isangi is a territory of the Democratic Republic of the Congo. It is located in the Tshopo District to the west of Kisangani, and mostly to the south of the Congo River. The largest community is Yangambi. Other communities are Isangi, Ligasa and Yanonge. The village of Yaboila was the scene of the murder in 1905 by Topoke people of two white officers of the Lomami Company, which led to severe reprisals.

According to the 1984 Census, the Topoke people accounted for 52.38% of the population of Isangi, or 128,613 out of 245,548 total inhabitants.

== Politics ==
Results of the DRC presidential election of 2011 for Isangi Territory:

- Joseph Kabila (Ind) 88.8%
- Étienne Tshisekedi (UDPS) 5.5%
- Vital Kamerhe (UNC) 1.6%
- Jean Andeka (ANCC) 0.9%
- Adam Bombolé (Ind) 0.8%
- François Joseph Mobutu (UDEMO) 0.6%
- François Nicéphore Kakese (URDC) 0.5%
- Antipas Mbusa (Ind) 0.4%
- Oscar Kashala (UREC) 0.3%
- Léon Kengo (UFC) 0.3%
- Josué Alex Mukendi (Ind) 0.3%

Isangi Territory is represented in the National Assembly by three deputies:

- Dieudonné Bolengetenge (MSR)
- Albert Botombula (AFDC)
- Jacques Asumani (UNADEF)
