= Tshopo River =

River in Democratic Republic of the Congo

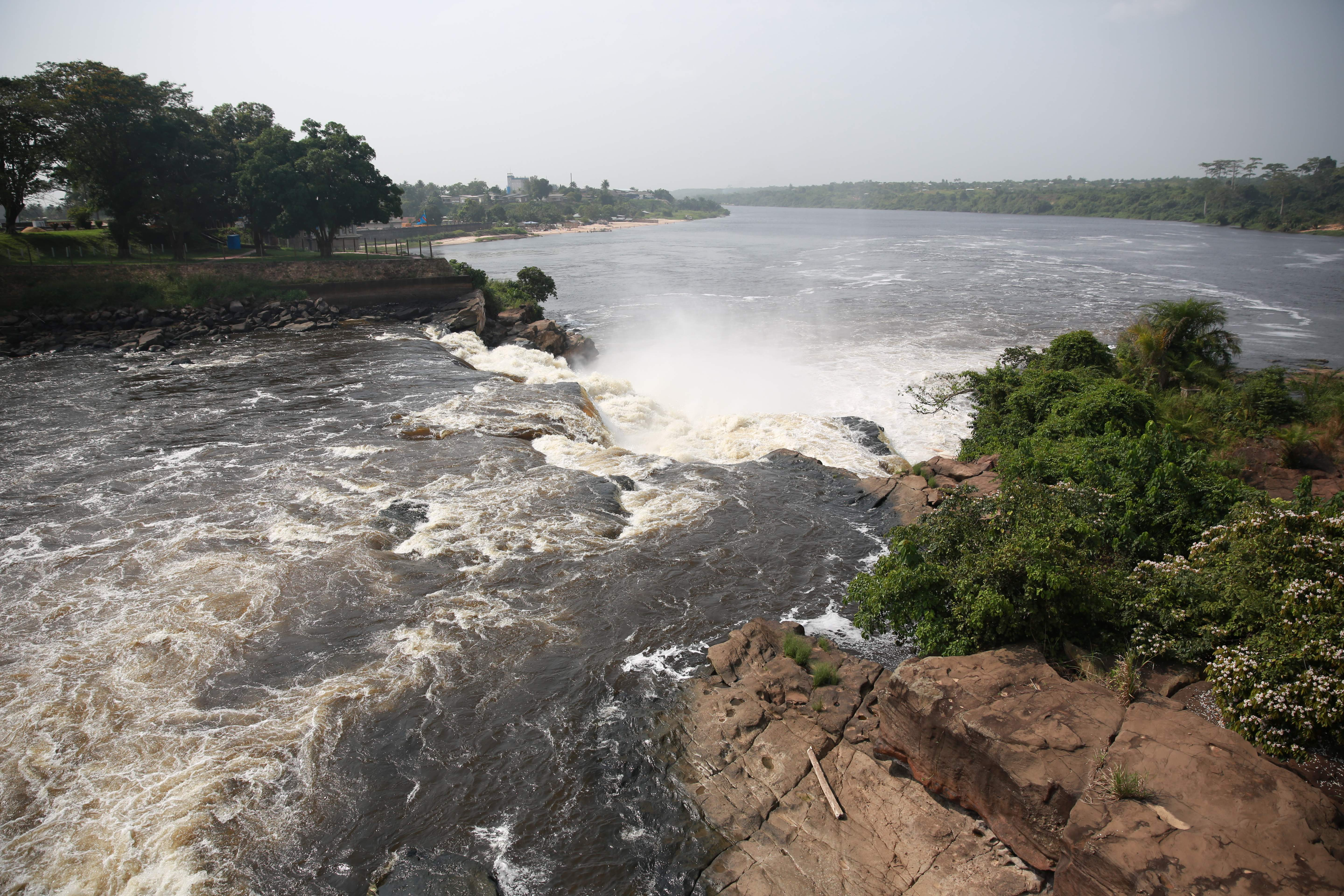
- Cascades of the Tshopo river, January 2015

- Location within Democratic Republic of the Congo

Location
- Country: Democratic Republic of the Congo

Physical characteristics
- Mouth: Congo River
  - coordinates: 0.563030°N 25.117032°E
- Basin size: 17,200 square kilometres (6,600 sq mi)
- Discharge
  - minimum: 100 cubic metres per second (3,500 cu ft/s)
  - maximum: 700 cubic metres per second (25,000 cu ft/s)

The Tshopo River is a river in the Democratic Republic of the Congo. It flows through the north of the city of Kisangani and joins the Lindi River just before that river enters the Congo River. It gives its name to the province of Tshopo.

== Basin ==
The Tshopo basin has an area of about 17,200 square kilometres (6,600 sq mi), mostly covered by Guinean-Congolian rainforests. It is elongated, and almost entirely north of the equator. The river flows from east to west and enters the Congo River 13 kilometres (8.1 mi) downstream from Kisangani where it joins the Lindi River. The great falls near the river mouth vary in height from 11.2 to 13.8 metres (37 to 45 ft) depending on the height of the Congo River. About 120 metres (390 ft) further upstream the small falls are 3.2 metres (10 ft) high over a section of rapids.

The location in the continental interior by the equator with two rainy seasons and two dry seasons, and the vegetation covering the basin, result in a fairly constant flow. There are low waters in February–April and in June–August, and high waters in April–May and particularly in October–December. Average annual flow is about 300–450 cubic metres per second (11,000–16,000 cu ft/s). At the great falls just above the river mouth the flow is 100–700 cubic metres per second (3,500–24,700 cu ft/s), with a velocity of 5–6 metres per second (16–20 ft/s). The water is pH 6.6–6.8, and has a temperature of 26–28 °C (79–82 °F) in January and June 1987.

== Ecology ==
The Lindi and Tshopo rivers form one of the three major right-bank river systems in the Cuvette Centrale, or central Congo Basin, the others being the Itimbiri River and Aruwimi River. According to a 2015 report, 184 species of fish had been found in the Lindi/Tshopo basin. The family of the elephant fish, Mormyridae, was richest in species. The river has clear water, compared to the turbid water of the Congo, making it habitable to plant species such as Inversodicraea.

Schistosomiasis is a chronic parasitic disease transmitted by a freshwater mollusc. A 2018 study of people living in a camp on the banks of the Tshopo river 28 kilometres (17 mi) from Kisangani on the old Buta road found 54.5% positive for Schistosoma haematobium and 7.3% positive for Schistosoma mansoni. This compared to 2.4% and 4.8% positive rates for people in a nearby village.

== Hydroelectric plant ==
A hydroelectric power plant was built at the Tshopo River Falls to the north of Kisangani in the 1950s, causing the local extinction of Inversodicraea congolana at one of the two sites in the world where it was found. It was a run-of-the-river plant, so did not require a large reservoir. The river passes through the hydroelectric dam and then over a waterfall. In 2013 Belgium's Minister for Cooperation and Development Jean-Pascal Labille and the Orientale Province governor Jean Bamanisa reopened the Tshopo hydroelectric facility after it had been closed for rehabilitation.

A truss bridge was built over the fall in 1968, providing a route for farmers from the northeast to access the city. It fell into disrepair, and in 2014 was replaced by a 163 metres (535 ft) steel panel bridge with a single lane that could carry vehicles up to 41 tons. It had two external pedestrian walkways.

== Sources ==
- Barnes, Robert (12 October 2015), "Tshopo River Bridge: how a panel bridge brings East and West Africa together", Construction Review Online
- Cheek, Martin; Feika, A.; Lebbie, Aiah; Goyder, David; Tchiengue, Barthélemy; Séné, Olivier; Tchouto, P.; Burgt, Xander (2017), "A synoptic revision of Inversodicraea (Podostemaceae)", Blumea - Biodiversity, Evolution and Biogeography of Plants, 62 (2): 125–156, Bibcode:2017Blume..62..125C, doi:10.3767/blumea.2017.62.02.07
- Daly, John (13 August 2013), "Belgian Minister Inaugurates Power Plant in Eastern DRC", OilPrice.com
- Decru, Eva (November 2015), The ichthyofauna of the Central Congo basin: diversity and distribution in the north-eastern tributaries (thesis), Snoeks, Jos (Supervisor); Vreven, Emmanuel (Co supervisor)
- Decru, Eva; Emmanuel, Vreven; Danadu, Célestin; Walanga, Albert; Mambo, Taylor; Snoeks, Jos (2017), "Ichthyofauna of the Itimbiri, Aruwimi, and Lindi/Tshopo rivers (Congo basin): Diversity and distribution patterns", Acta Ichthyologica et Piscatoria, 47 (3): 225–247, doi:10.3750/AIEP/02085
- Léonard, J. (30 September 1993), "Etude phytosociologique des chutes de la Tshopo (Kisangani: Zaïre)", Bulletin du Jardin botanique National de Belgique / Bulletin van de Nationale Plantentuin van België (in French), 62 (1/4), Botanic Garden Meise: 283–347, doi:10.2307/3668280, JSTOR 3668280
- Mongita Esol’e, B.; Zingabako Ngbingina, C.; Anagwatalibe Kota, A.; Mopaya Pakowe, H.; Etisomba Likoke, F. M. (2020), "Prevalence of Schistosomiasis among the Bavaido Village Peasants and the Residents of Tshopo River at Kisangani- DR. Congo", South Asian Journal of Parasitology, 3 (3): 1–8
- "Relation: Tshopo", OpenStreetMap
