= MWZ (disambiguation) =

MWZ is the IATA code for Mwanza Airport, Tanzania

MWZ or mwz can also refer to:

- Mahishadahari railway station, West Bengal, India (station code: MWZ)
- Moingi language, a Bantu language spoken in the Democratic Republic of the Congo (iso 639-3 code: mwz)

== See also ==
- 13MWZ (men's jeans with zipper) a style of jeans made by Wrangler (jeans) first introduced in 1947.
