= Kele language =

Kele language may refer to:

- Kele language (New Guinea)
- Kele language (Congo)
- Kele language (Gabon)
- Kele language (Nigeria)

== See also ==
- Kele languages, a Bantu subgroup
