= WEKO =

WEKO may refer to:

- Weko, a community in the Democratic Republic of the Congo
- WVOZ (AM), a radio station (1580 AM) licensed to serve San Juan, Puerto Rico, which held the call sign WEKO from 2004 to 2015
- German acronym of the Competition Commission of Switzerland
