= Yatolema =

- Location within Democratic Republic of the Congo
- Coordinates: 0.413185°N 24.535818°E
- Country: Democratic Republic of the Congo
- Province: Tshopo
- Territory: Opala Territory
- Climate: Af
- National language: Lingala

Yatolema is a village in the Opala Territory of the Tshopo Province of the Democratic Republic of the Congo. It is on the N7 road which connects it to Kisangani to the east. Yatolema is about 58 miles (93 km) from Kisangani. It has a weekly market where local people can exchange goods with traders from the city. The village serves the surrounding area with a rural health center.
