= Lingomo =

- Location within Democratic Republic of the Congo
- Coordinates: 0.686994°N 22.053831°E
- Country: DR Congo
- Province: Tshuapa
- Time zone: UTC+1 (West Africa Time)

Lingomo is a community in Tshuapa province of the Democratic Republic of the Congo.

In 1908 the missionary W.R. Kirby was stationed at Yalemba. In January of that year he made a tour of the country on the south side of the Congo River, and a summary of his findings was published in the London Times on 18 June 1908.

He made serious accusations that the head of the post at Lingomo was forcing the local people to harvest rubber, burning the villages of those who resisted, destroying their crops of bananas and manioc and taking men, women and children into captivity.
