= Linga language =

Bantu language of DR Congo

Linga
- Elinga
- Native to: Democratic Republic of the Congo
- Language family: Niger–Congo?: Atlantic–Congo; Benue–Congo; Bantoid; Bantu (Zone C); Soko–Kele (C.50–60); Linga

Language codes
- ISO 639-3: –
- Glottolog: elin1238
- Guthrie code: C.502

Linga (Elinga) is a Bantu language of the Soko–Kele group, spoken in the Democratic Republic of the Congo.
