= Moyen-Congo =

Moyen-Congo may refer to:

- A former French colony in Africa, known as:
  - French Congo (Congo français, 1882–1903)
  - Moyen-Congo or Middle Congo (1903–1958), part of French Equatorial Africa between 1910 and 1958
  - The Republic of the Congo from 1958, independent since 1960
- Moyen-Congo Province (1962–1966), a former province of the Democratic Republic of the Congo, part of the larger Équateur province
