= Pagibete language =

Bantu language spoken in DR Congo

Pagibete
- Apagibete
- Native to: DR Congo
- Native speakers: (28,000 cited 2000)
- Language family: Niger–Congo?: Atlantic–Congo; Benue–Congo; Bantoid; Bantu (Zone C.40); Boan; Bomokandian; Bati–Angba; Bwa–Pagibete; Pagibete

Language codes
- ISO 639-3: pae
- Glottolog: pagi1243
- Guthrie code: C.401

Pagibete is a Bantu language spoken in the Democratic Republic of Congo. It is similar to Bwa, and might be considered a dialect.

== Writing system ==
Pagibete alphabet
Uppercase	A	B	Ɓ	D	Ɗ	E	Ɛ	F	G	H	I	K	L	M	N	Ŋ	O	Ɔ	P	R	S	T	U	V	W	Y	Z
Lowercase	a	b	ɓ	d	ɗ	e	ɛ	f	g	h	i	k	l	m	n	ŋ	o	ɔ	p	r	s	t	u	v	w	y	z
