= Bwa language =

Bantu language of the Democratic Republic of the Congo

Bwa
- Benge-Baati
- Yewu
- Native to: DR Congo
- Ethnicity: Boa
- Native speakers: (200,000 cited 1994)
- Language family: Niger–Congo?: Atlantic–Congo; Benue–Congo; Bantoid; Bantu (Zone C.40); Boan; Bomokandian; Bati–Angba; Bwa–Pagibete; Bwa

Language codes
- ISO 639-3: bww
- Glottolog: bwaa1238
- Guthrie code: C.43–44

Bwa (Boa, Boua, Bua, Kibua, Kibwa, Libua, Libwali) is a Bantu language spoken in the Democratic Republic of the Congo.

Dialects are

- Leboa-Le (Bwa proper)
- Yewu
- Kiba
- Benge (Libenge)
- Bati (Baati)
- Boganga (Boyanga)
- Ligbe

Pagibete is close, and might be considered another dialect.
