= Lokilo =

- Location within Democratic Republic of the Congo
- Coordinates: 0.45°S 24.01667°E
- Country: Democratic Republic of Congo
- Province: Tshopo
- Territory: Opala Territory
- National language: Lingala

Lokilo is a community in the Opala Territory of the Tshopo Province of the Democratic Republic of Congo.

In the colonial era of the Belgian Congo, Lokilo was one of the areas from which the Lomami Company collected large amounts of rubber. The Mbole people of the region vividly described their view of the effect of collecting rubber with the phrase wando wo limolo, meaning "tax-caused loss of weight".
