= Mbole language =

Language

Mbole
- Lombole
- Native to: DR Congo
- Region: Tshopo District
- Ethnicity: Mbole
- Native speakers: (100,000 cited 1971)
- Language family: Niger–Congo?: Atlantic–Congo; Benue–Congo; Bantoid; Bantu (Zone D); Mbole–Enya (D.10); Mbole

Language codes
- ISO 639-3: mdq
- Glottolog: mbol1247
- Guthrie code: D.11

Mbole is a Bantu language of the Democratic Republic of the Congo. It is spoken by the Mbole people, with a population of about 100,000 as of 1971 living in the Tshopo District, southwest of Kisangani in the Democratic Republic of the Congo.
