= 2011 Democratic Republic of the Congo general election =

2011 DR Congo general election
- 28 November 2011
- Presidential election
- Turnout: 59.05%
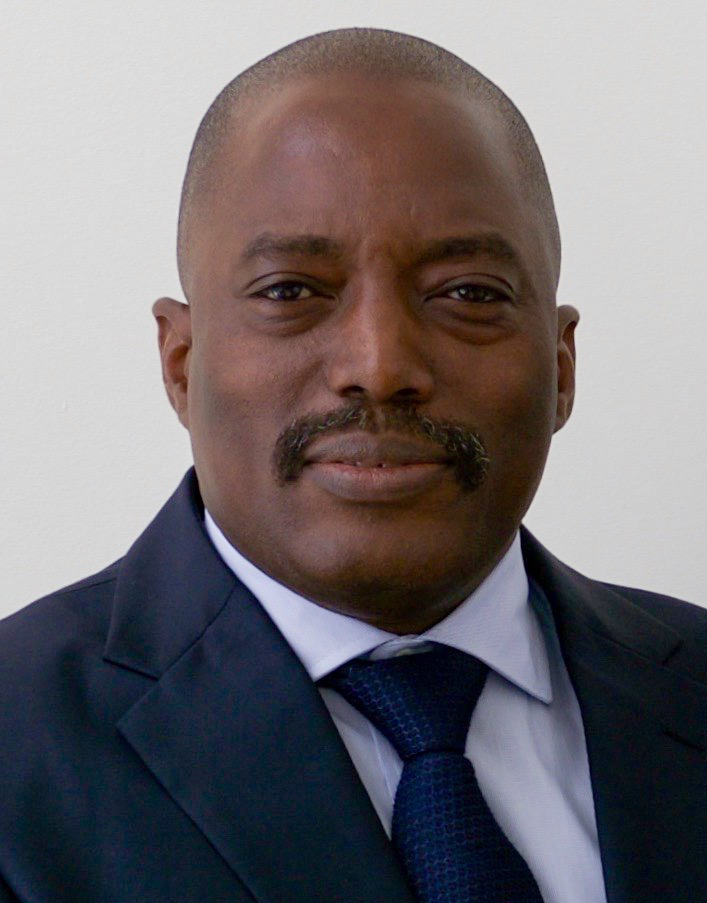

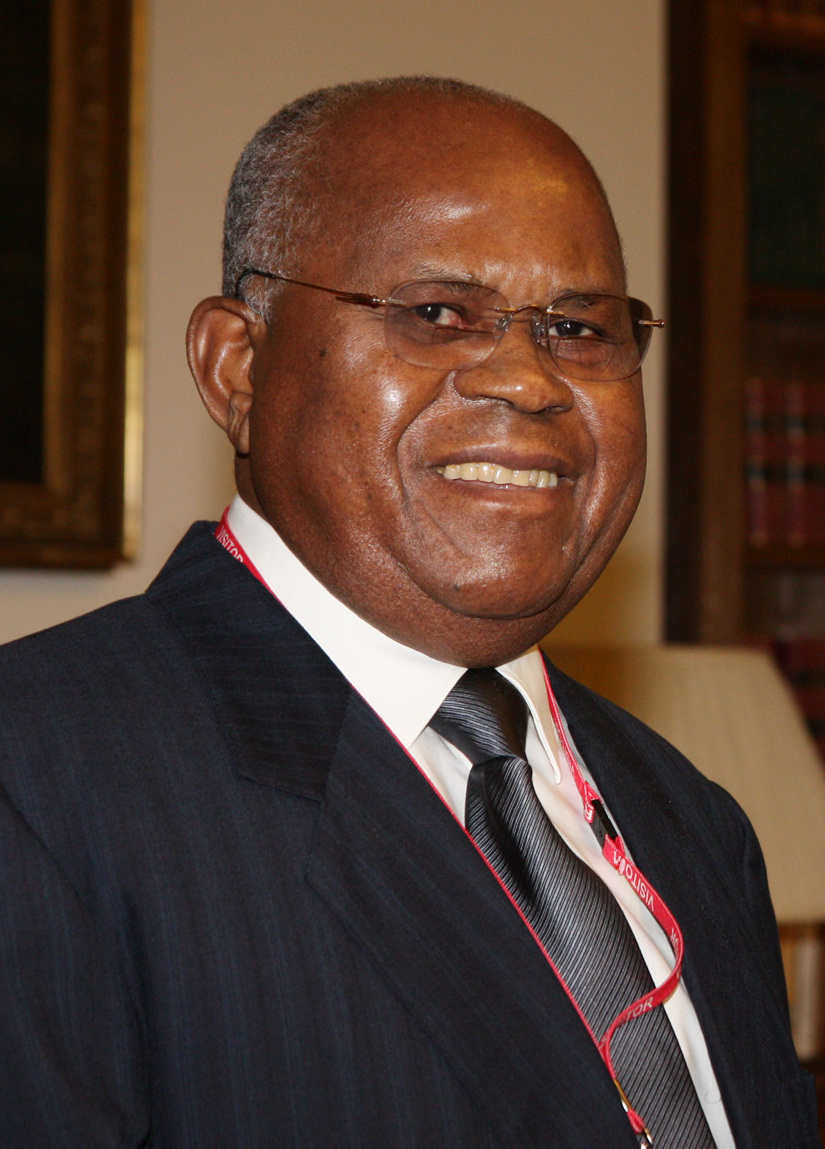
| Nominee | Joseph Kabila | Étienne Tshisekedi |
| Party | Independent | UDPS |
| Alliance | AMP; PPRD |
| Popular vote | 8,880,944 | 5,864,775 |
| Percentage | 48.95% | 32.33% |
President before election
Joseph Kabila
Independent
Elected President
Joseph Kabila
Independent

General elections were held in Democratic Republic of the Congo on 28 November 2011 for the President of the Republic and all 500 seats of the National Assembly. A facultative run-off on 26 February 2012 was shelved with a change in election laws allowing a presidential candidate to win with a plurality of the vote. Incumbent president Joseph Kabila, an independent candidate, (Note: Kabila was supported by the Alliance of the Presidential Majority, which notably included the People's Party for Reconstruction and Democracy.) was constitutionally eligible to run for a second term and defeated Étienne Tshisekedi of the Union for Democracy and Social Progress. Kabila was inaugurated on 20 December 2011.

The government passed laws to abolish the second round of the presidential election and tried to change the legislative electoral system from proportional to majority representation, which was strongly criticized by the opposition.

International organizations such as the United Nations and the European Union raised concerns about the transparency of the elections.

On 8 November 2011 opposition leader Étienne Tshisekedi declared himself president saying the majority of people turned against President Kabila.

On 28 November 2011 the elections were held under difficult conditions. Voting was characterized by incidents of violence throughout the country. Because of violence and delays in the delivery of ballot boxes elections were extended by a second day.

== Candidates ==
1. Jean Andeka (ANCC)
2. Adam Bombolé (independent)
3. Joseph Kabila (independent)
4. François Nicéphore Kakese (URDC)
5. Vital Kamerhe (UNC)
6. Oscar Kashala (UREC)
7. Léon Kengo (UFC)
8. Antipas Mbusa (independent)
9. Nzanga Mobutu (Udemo)
10. Josué Alex Mukendi (independent)
11. Étienne Tshisekedi (UDPS)

== Registration ==
DR Congo's National Independent Electoral Commission has registered 32 million voters for the November elections.

| Province | Registered voters |
|---|---|
| Kinshasa | 3,287,745 |
| Bas-Congo | 1,502,939 |
| Bandundu | 3,553,322 |
| Equateur | 3,960,643 |
| Orientale | 3,886,524 |
| North Kivu | 3,003,246 |
| South Kivu | 2,022,960 |
| Maniema | 874,809 |
| Katanga | 4,627,302 |
| Kasai Oriental | 2,643,905 |
| Kasai Occidental | 2,661,245 |
| Total | 32,024,640 |

== Results ==
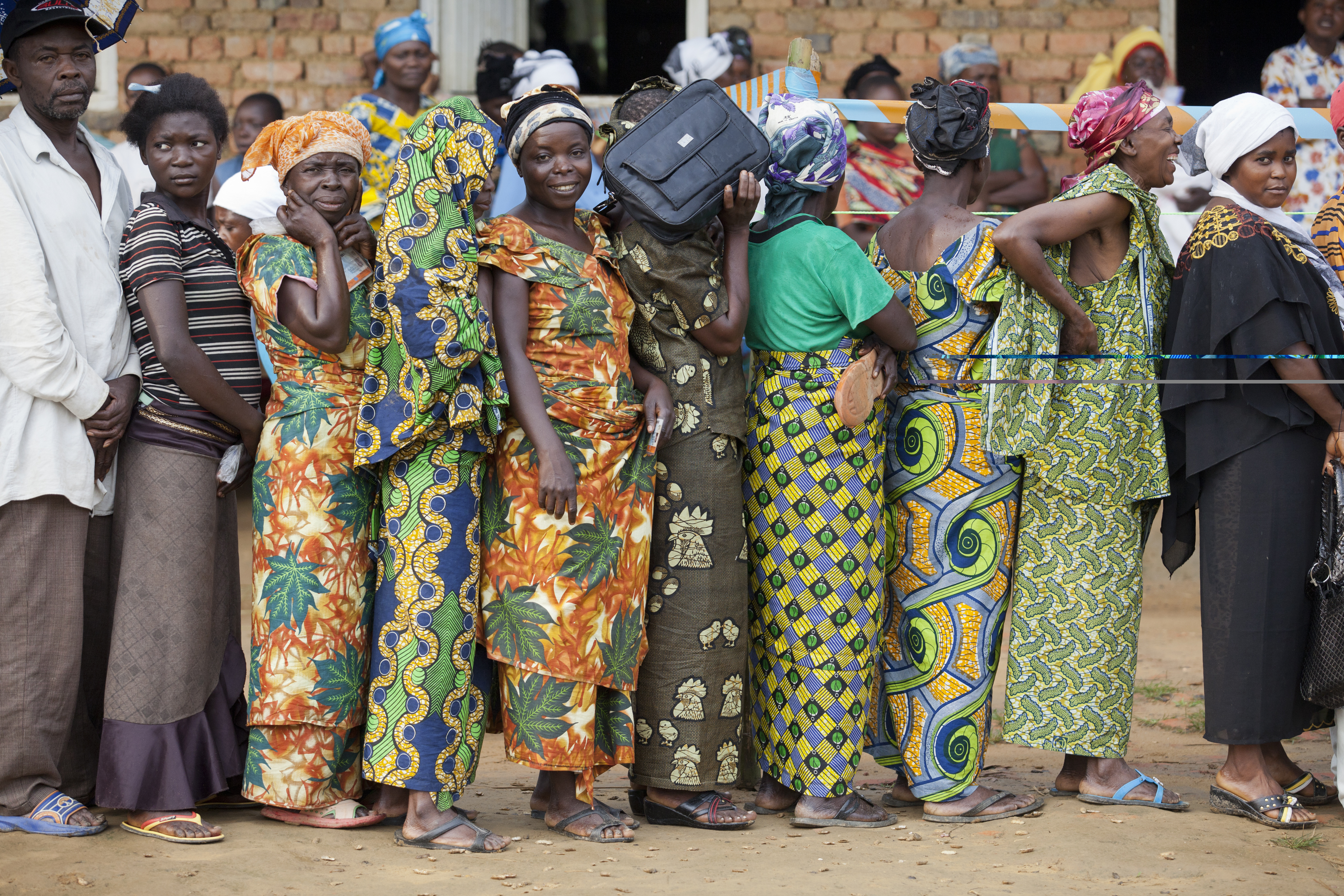
Voters standing in line in Walikale

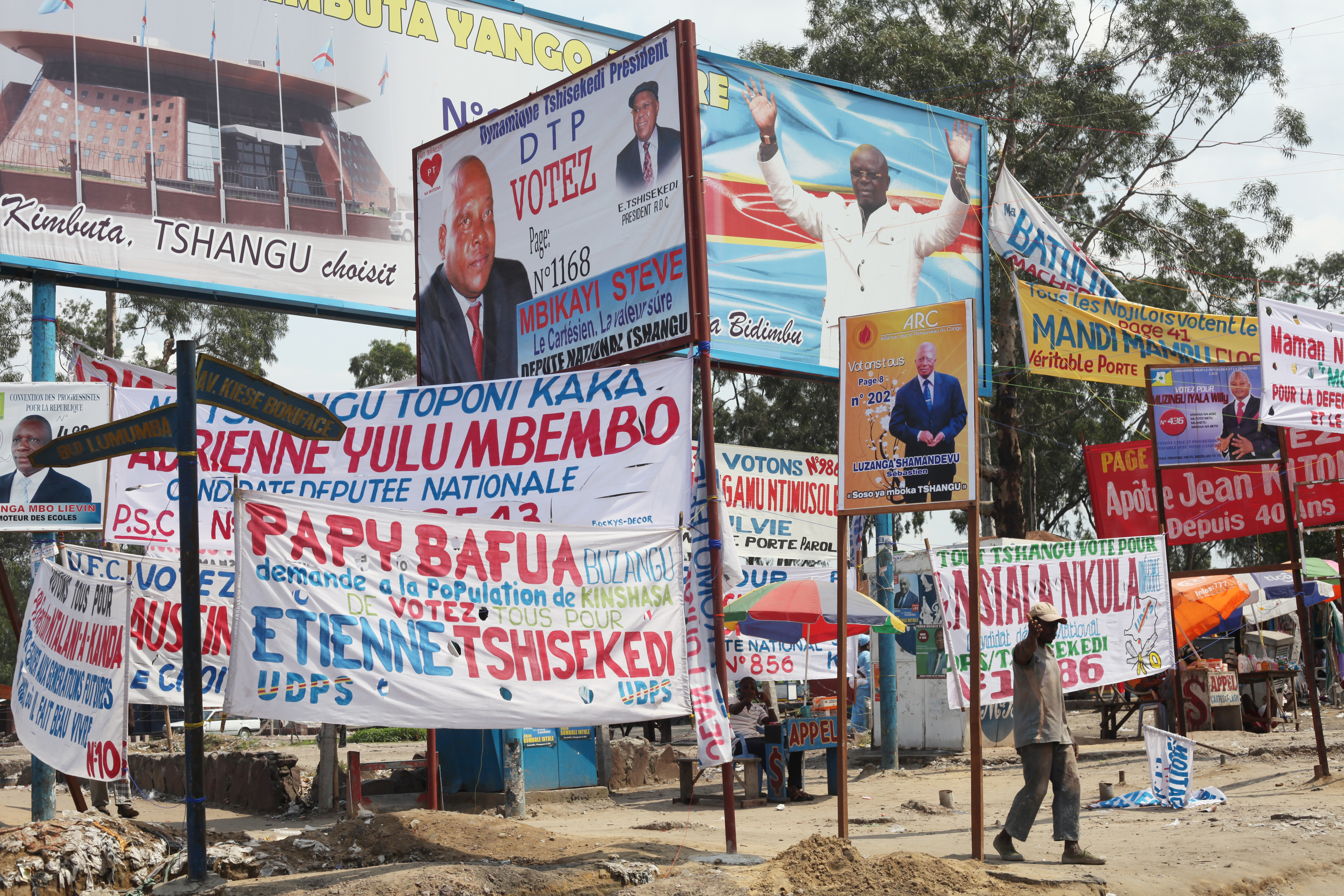
Electoral campaign posters in Ndjili, Kinshasa

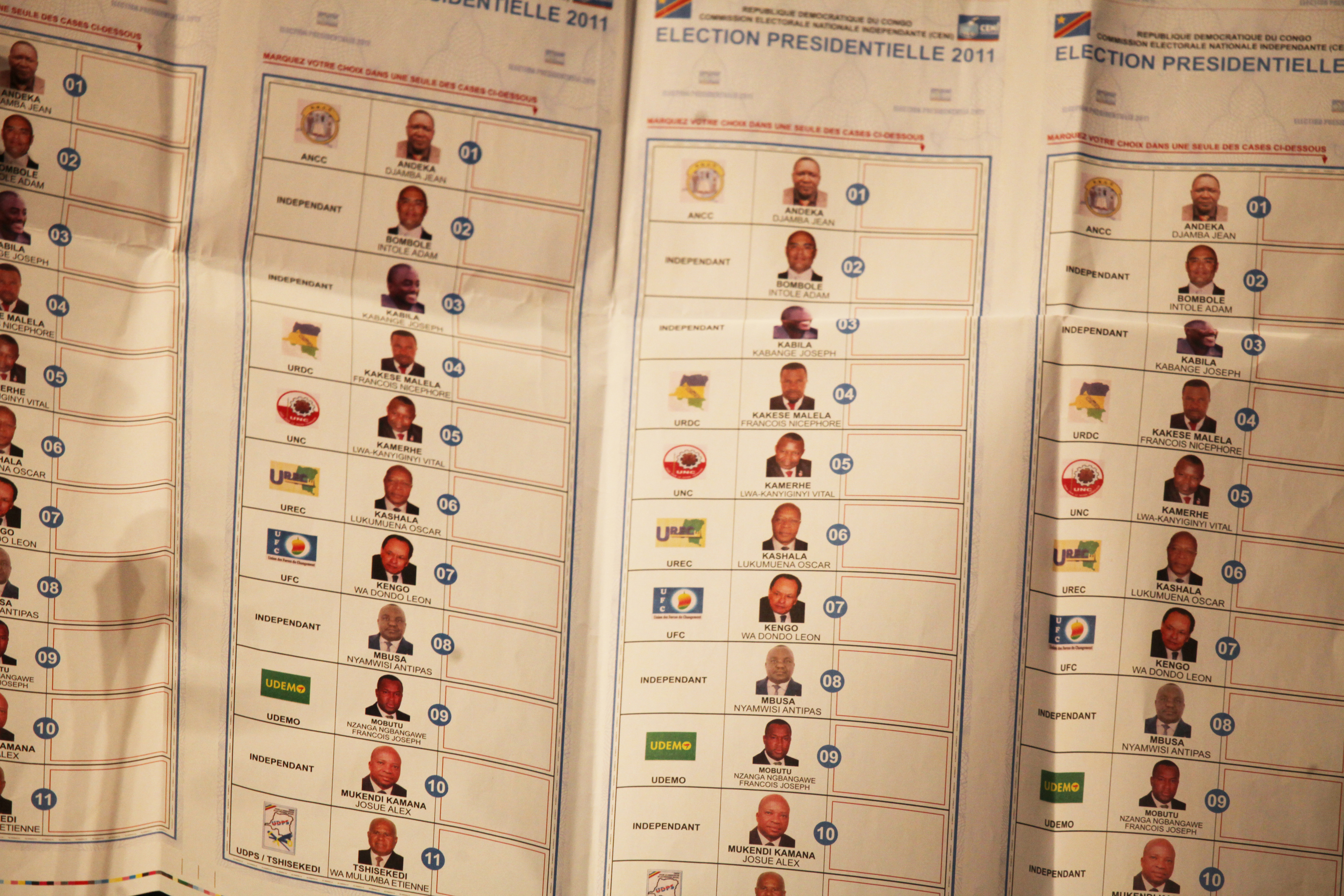
Voting cards for the 2011 election

=== President ===
The first results released on 2 December 2011, with 15% of the vote counted (mostly in areas considered Kabila strongholds), gave Kabila only a narrow lead of 940,000 votes against 912,000 votes for UPDS leader Tshisekedi.

With half the precincts counted, Kabila was leading with 4.9 million votes, or nearly 49%. His opponent Etienne Tshisekedi was trailing with 3.4 million votes, about 34%. However, this count did not include much of Kinshasa, where Tshisekedi was expected to have strong results. Kabila ceased all email and SMS services nationwide. It has been also said that over 5,000,000 of ballot papers were pre-ticked for the number 3 candidate (Kabila), but no formal actions were taken by the CENI. Some witnesses said that young men had beaten election officials who tried to bring in fraudulent ballots, which were subsequently burned.

The announcement of final results was postponed to 8 December 2011; with over two thirds of the vote counted, Kabila led with 46% to Tshisekedi's 36%.

The Independent National Electoral Commission declared Kabila as the winner on December 9. The result was put into question by the Carter Center as well as the archbishop of Kinshasa, Cardinal Laurent Monsengwo Pasinya, claiming too many irregularities occurred to assure that the results reflected the will of the people. The Carter Center indicated that ballots had been missing in some areas while in others Kabila achieved unrealistic results. Observers from the Carter Center noted that in some districts voter turnout was reported to be 100 percent, which is extremely unlikely. MONUSCO, the peacekeeping mission of the United Nations, also voiced concern about the results.

While Kabila admitted that some mistakes had been made in the process, he rejected concerns about the outcome. The result was confirmed by the Supreme Court of the Democratic Republic of Congo.

Jerome Kitoko, President of the Supreme Court, announcing the official results proclaimed Kabila to be the winner of the presidential election.

| Candidate | Party | Votes | % |
|---|---|---|---|
| Joseph Kabila | Independent | 8,880,944 | 48.95 |
| Étienne Tshisekedi | Union for Democracy and Social Progress | 5,864,775 | 32.33 |
| Vital Kamerhe | Union for the Congolese Nation | 1,403,372 | 7.74 |
| Léon Kengo | Union of Forces for Change | 898,362 | 4.95 |
| Antipas Mbusa | Independent | 311,787 | 1.72 |
| Nzanga Mobutu | Union of Mobutist Democrats | 285,273 | 1.57 |
| Jean Andeka | Alliance of Congolese Nationalist Believers | 128,820 | 0.71 |
| Adam Bombolé | Independent | 126,623 | 0.70 |
| François Nicéphore Kakese | Union for the Revival and the Development of Congo | 92,737 | 0.51 |
| Josué Alex Mukendi | Independent | 78,151 | 0.43 |
| Oscar Kashala | Union for the Rebuilding of Congo | 72,260 | 0.40 |
| Total | | 18,143,104 | 100.00 |
| Valid votes | | 18,143,104 | 95.94 |
| Invalid/blank votes | | 768,468 | 4.06 |
| Total votes | | 18,911,572 | 100.00 |
| Registered voters/turnout | | 32,024,640 | 59.05 |
Source: African Elections Database

=== National Assembly ===
| Party | Votes | % | Seats |
|---|---|---|---|
| People's Party for Reconstruction and Democracy | | | 69 |
| Union for Democracy and Social Progress | | | 42 |
| People's Party for Peace and Democracy | | | 30 |
| Social Movement for Renewal | | | 28 |
| Movement for the Liberation of the Congo | | | 21 |
| Alliance of Congo Democratic Forces | | | 17 |
| Unified Lumumbist Party | | | 17 |
| Union for the Congolese Nation | | | 16 |
| Alliance for the Renewal of Congo | | | 15 |
| Rally for the Reconstruction of Congo | | | 12 |
| Christian Democratic Party | | | 9 |
| Congo Future | | | 8 |
| Awakening Conscience for Labor and Development | | | 8 |
| Movement for the Integrity of People | | | 8 |
| Union of Federalist Nationalists of Congo | | | 8 |
| Forces for Renewal | | | 7 |
| Congolese Union for Progress | | | 6 |
| Union for the Development of Congo | | | 6 |
| United Congolese Convention | | | 5 |
| Convention of Progressives for the Republic | | | 5 |
| New Alliance of Democrats | | | 5 |
| National Union of Federalist Democrats | | | 5 |
| Congolese Labor Alliance for Development | | | 4 |
| Convention of Christian Democrats | | | 4 |
| Convention for the Republic and Democracy | | | 4 |
| Congolese Movement for Renaissance | | | 4 |
| Congolese Party for Development | | | 4 |
| Union of Federalist Christian Democrats | | | 4 |
| Union of Forces for Change | | | 4 |
| Alliance of Humanist Democrats | | | 3 |
| Congress of Allies for Action in Congo | | | 3 |
| DCF–COFEDEC | | | 3 |
| Federalist Christian Democracy-Nyamwisi | | | 3 |
| League for the Defense of Citizens' Interests | | | 3 |
| Support for Étienne Tshisekedi | | | 3 |
| Alliance of Builders of Kongo | | | 2 |
| Christian Alliance for Democracy and Development | | | 2 |
| Alliance for Development and the Republic | | | 2 |
| Build a United and Prosperous Congo | | | 2 |
| Party for Peace in Congo | | | 2 |
| Commitment to Citizenship and Development | | | 2 |
| Foundation of Congo | | | 2 |
| Congolese People's Movement for the Republic | | | 2 |
| Movement of Solidarity for Change | | | 2 |
| National Party for Democracy and the Republic | | | 2 |
| Reformist Party | | | 2 |
| Regrouping of Democrats for Progress | | | 2 |
| Party for the Renaissance of Congo | | | 2 |
| Solidarity for National Development | | | 2 |
| Union of Mobutist Democrats | | | 2 |
| Union of Congolese Patriots | | | 2 |
| Agreement with the Allies Alliance | | | 1 |
| Congolese Alliance of Christian Democrats | | | 1 |
| Alliance for Humanism and Democracy | | | 1 |
| Alliance for Justice, Development, and Solidarity | | | 1 |
| Christian Convention for Democracy | | | 1 |
| Current Future | | | 1 |
| Congolese National Congress | | | 1 |
| Convention for Democracy and Liberty | | | 1 |
| Convention for Renaissance and Progress | | | 1 |
| Christian Democracy | | | 1 |
| Dynamics for Democracy in Congo | | | 1 |
| Volunteers Together for Development Party of the Democratic Republic of the Congo | | | 1 |
| Independent Front for Christian Democracy | | | 1 |
| Nationalist and Integrationist Front | | | 1 |
| Innovative Forces for Union and Solidarity | | | 1 |
| Force of the People | | | 1 |
| Front of Social Democrats for Development | | | 1 |
| Social Front of Independent Republicans | | | 1 |
| Generation for Solidarity and the Development of Congo | | | 1 |
| Christian Movement for Solidarity and Democracy | | | 1 |
| Movement of Independent Reformists | | | 1 |
| Lumumbist Progressive Movement | | | 1 |
| Solidarity Movement for Democracy and Development | | | 1 |
| Our Beautiful Country | | | 1 |
| Autonomous Organization of the People for Renewal | | | 1 |
| Party for Action | | | 1 |
| Party of Nationalists for Integral Development | | | 1 |
| National Alliance Party for Unity | | | 1 |
| Renewal Party | | | 1 |
| Christian Republican Party | | | 1 |
| Coalition of Congolese Resistance Patriots | | | 1 |
| Congolese Party for Good Governance | | | 1 |
| Christian Democrat Party for the Development of the Congolese | | | 1 |
| Congolese Ecologist Party | | | 1 |
| National Party for Reform | | | 1 |
| National Party of Renewal for Development | | | 1 |
| Labor Party | | | 1 |
| Liberal Labor Party | | | 1 |
| National Unity Party | | | 1 |
| Rally for Economic and Social Development | | | 1 |
| Rally of Congolese Democrats and Nationalists | | | 1 |
| Rally for the Defense of Congolese People | | | 1 |
| Rally of Democrats for the Republic | | | 1 |
| Rally for Unity, Development, and the Environment of Congo | | | 1 |
| Congolese Solidarity for Democracy | | | 1 |
| Congolese Union for Liberty | | | 1 |
| Union for the Development of the Nation | | | 1 |
| Union for Democracy and Progress-Kibassa | | | 1 |
| Liberal Christian Democrats Union | | | 1 |
| Union for Liberty, Peace, and Development | | | 1 |
| Union for the Nation | | | 1 |
| National Union of Christian Democrats | | | 1 |
| Union for the Republic | | | 1 |
| Congolese Socialist Union | | | 1 |
| Independents | | | 13 |
| Vacant | | | 8 |
| Total | | | 500 |
| Registered voters/turnout | 32,024,640 | – | |
Source: African Elections Database

== Aftermath ==
The rebels in the 2012 East D.R. Congo conflict said Kabila was not the legal winner of the election and must resign.
