= Opala Territory =

Opala Wilaya ya Opala (Swahili)
- Interactive map of Opala
- Coordinates: 0.601319°S 24.354887°E
- Country: DR Congo
- Province: Tshopo

Population (2019)
  - Total: 320,650
- Time zone: UTC+2 (CAT)
- National language: Lingala

Opala is a territory in the Tshopo Province of the Democratic Republic of the Congo.

The administrative center is the town of Opala. Other communities are Yatolema, Lokilo and Mayoko. The territory is divided into Sectors and Chiefdoms:

- Balinga-Lindja Sector
- Yawende-Loolo Sector
- Yeyango Chiefdom
- Yomale Chiefdom
- Yalingo Chiefdom
- Iye Sector
- Yapandu Chiefdom
- Mongo Chiefdom
- Kembe Chiefdom
- Opala Sector
