= Lindi River =

River in Democratic Republic of the Congo

Coordinates: 0.5583°N 25.0889°E

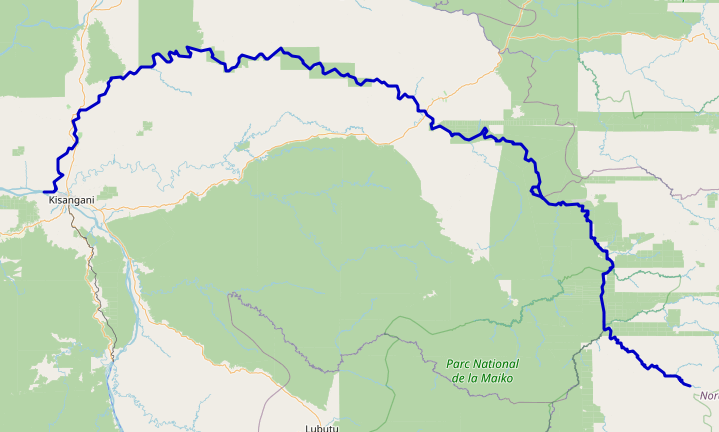

- Location of mouth in the DR Congo

Physical characteristics
- Mouth: Congo River
  - location: Kisangani

The Lindi (Swahili: Mto Lindi) is a minor river of northeastern Democratic Republic of the Congo. It flows through North Kivu and Tshopo provinces, and empties into the Congo River just west of Kisangani.

== Settlements ==
- Asangwa
- Bafwasende (N4 road bridge)
- Yasangani (N4 road bridge)
