= Poke language =

Bantu language spoken in DR Congo

Poke
- Native to: Democratic Republic of the Congo
- Region: Isangi Territory
- Ethnicity: Topoke
- Native speakers: (130,000 cited 1984)
- Language family: Niger–Congo?: Atlantic–Congo; Volta-Congo; Benue–Congo; Bantoid; Southern Bantoid; Bantu (Zone C); Soko–Kele; Poke

Language codes
- ISO 639-3: pof
- Glottolog: poke1238
- Guthrie code: C.53

The Poke language (also called Puki, Tofoke, Topoke or Tovoke), is in the Soko–Kele languages group of Bantu languages. It is spoken by the Topoke people of the Tshopo District, Isangi Territory, in the Democratic Republic of the Congo.
