= Yangambi Airport =

- IATA: YAN; ICAO: FZIR

Summary
- Location: Yangambi
- Elevation AMSL: 1,348 ft / 411 m
- Coordinates: 0°48′0″N 24°27′0″E

Map
- Location in the Democratic Republic of the Congo

Runways
Direction	Length		Surface
Direction	ft	m	Surface
	2,625	800

Yangambi Airport is a small airport serving the town of Yangambi, Democratic Republic of the Congo.
