= Kango language (Bas-Uélé District) =

Bantu language spoken in the Democratic Republic of the Congo

Kango
- Likango
- Native to: DR Congo
- Native speakers: 5,900 (2002)
- Language family: Niger–Congo?: Atlantic–Congo; Benue–Congo; Bantoid; Bantu (Zone C.40); Boan; Bomokandian; Bwa; Kango

Language codes
- ISO 639-3: kty
- Glottolog: kang1286
- Guthrie code: C.403

Kango is a Bantu language spoken in the Bas-Uele District of the Democratic Republic of the Congo. It may be a cover term for various dialects spoken by fishing people in the area.
