= Enya language =

Language

Enya
- Genya
- Native to: DR Congo
- Region: Orientale Province
- Native speakers: (15,000 cited 2000)
- Language family: Niger–Congo?: Atlantic–Congo; Benue–Congo; Bantoid; Bantu (Zone D); Mbole–Enya (D.10); Enya

Language codes
- ISO 639-3: Either: gey – Enya zla – Zula
- Glottolog: enya1247
- Guthrie code: D.14, D.141

Enya is a Bantu language of the Democratic Republic of the Congo.

Maho (2009) lists D141 Zura (Zula) as most closely related.
