= Asangwa =

Town in Nord-Kivu Province, Democratic Republic of the Congo

- Town
- Location within Democratic Republic of the Congo
- Coordinates: 0°18′N 28°4′E
- Country: Democratic Republic of the Congo
- Province: Nord-Kivu Province
- Territory: Lubero Territory
- Time zone: UTC+2 (CAT)

Asangwa is a town in North Kivu in the northeastern Democratic Republic of the Congo. It is located in the Bapere Sector of Lubero Territory, along the Lindi River. In 2026, a commander of the Allied Democratic Forces, a Ugandan rebel group affiliated with the Islamic State, was reported to have been killed outside the town.
