= Moingi language =

Bantu language of DR Congo

Moingi
- Native to: DR Congo
- Native speakers: 4,200 (2002)
- Language family: Niger–Congo?: Atlantic–Congo; Benue–Congo; Bantoid; Bantu (Zone C); (unclassified; possibly Soko–Kele or Bwa); Moingi

Language codes
- ISO 639-3: mwz
- Glottolog: moin1241
- Guthrie code: none

Moingi is an unclassified Bantu language on the right bank of the Congo River opposite the town of Basoko in the Democratic Republic of Congo. It is situated among several Soko–Kele languages, and is quite close to a few Bwa languages, but it is not known if it is particularly closely related to any of them.
