= National Institute of Agronomic Studies and Research =

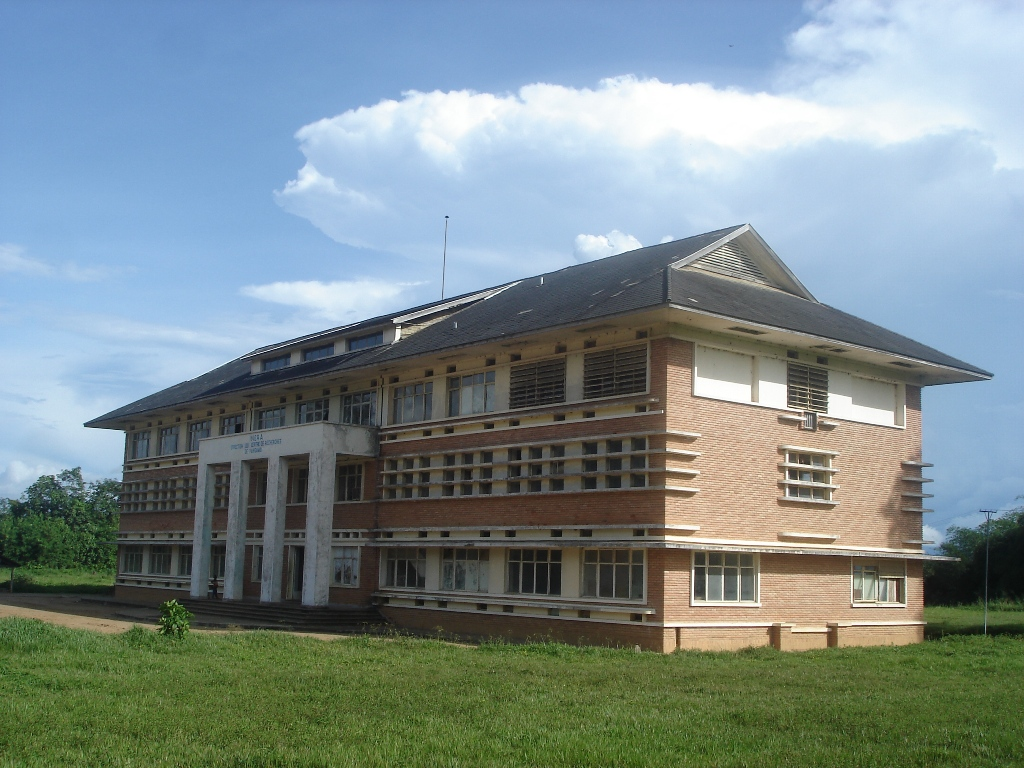
Institut National des Etudes et Recherches Agronomique (INERA – formerly INEAC), Yangambi (2011)

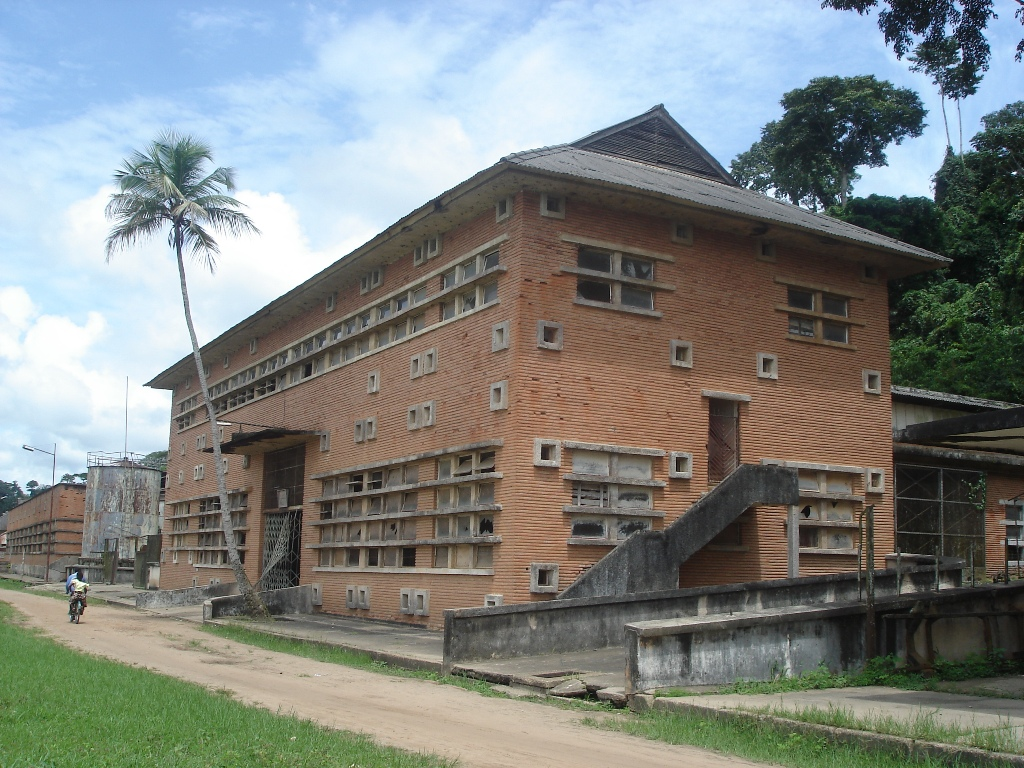
Institut National des Etudes et Recherches Agronomique, depot, Yangambi (2011)

National Institute for Agronomic Study of the Belgian Congo, Laboratory for Soil science, Yangambi, 1937–1954

Map displaying the indigenous peasantry programme in the Belgian Congo, 1955

The National Institute of Agronomic Studies and Research (INERA) is a higher education institution based in Kinshasa, Democratic Republic of the Congo. It specializes in agricultural engineering, biological sciences, and earth sciences. In addition to its headquarters in Kinshasa, it has research stations in M'vuazi (Kongo Central), Gandajika (Lomami), Yangambi (Tshopo), Nioka (Ituri), and Mulungu (South Kivu).

Founded in 1926 as the Authority des Plantations de la Colonie (REPCO), it was transformed into the National Institute for Agronomic Study of the Belgian Congo (INÉAC) on 22 December 1933. On 31 December 1962, INÉAC changed its name to the National Institute of Agronomic Studies and Research (INERA). Still in Yangambi, the Congo Crisis led to the institute's headquarters being gradually transferred to Kinshasa, an operation completed in 1971. INERA in Yangambi remained as a research center linked to Kinshasa, with the Faculty Institute of Agricultural Sciences of Yangambi (IFA-Yangambi) being created in parallel.

== History ==
INEAC was established as a successor to the Authority des Plantations de la Colonie (REPCO; Régie des Plantations de la Colonie). The INEAC experimental fields and research facilities were built along the north bank of the Congo River, and along a road stretching northward from the river for about 25 kilometres (16 mi). The goal of this institute was to follow a more scientific approach with regards to agricultural policies and innovations, and to promote the diffusion of agricultural innovations and know-how under the Congolese farmers. The creation of this institute was part of a larger 'indigenous peasantry programme'. This policy aimed to modernize indigenous agriculture by assigning plots of land to individual families (after rigorous prospection and soil analysis) and by providing them with government support in the form of selected seeds, agronomic advice, fertilizers, etc. The indigenous agricultural techniques were combined with new scientific discoveries, aimed at creating more efficient hybrid farming models and increasing the living standards in the traditional rural communities.

In the 1930s researchers at INÉAC found the relationship between the tenera, dura and pisifera oil palms. Oil palms have relatively low yield around Yangambi compared to coastal regions. This appears to be due to the lower night temperatures in the continental interior, which have a mean minimum at Yangambi of around 20 °C (68 °F). The scientific research undertaken by INÉAC played an essential role in improving the supply of rubber and palm oil in support of the war effort during World War II. The REPCO was transformed into the National Institute for Agronomic Study of the Belgian Congo (INÉAC; Institut national pour l'étude agronomique du Congo belge; or in dutch: Nationaal Instituut voor de Landbouwkunde in Belgisch-Congo-NILCO) on 22 December 1933.

After the second World War, the indigenous peasantry programme became widely spread all over the rural parts of the Belgian Congo, based on the (economic) success of the pilot projects in the mid thirties. The Institute for Agronomic Study of the Belgian Congo also played an important role in the implementation of the Ten year plan for the economic and social development of the Belgian Congo (1950–1959), of which the agrarian development of the colony was one of the cornerstones.

In this way, the INÉAC had a vast impact on the practical implementation of the social and economic agricultural policy of the colonial government. During this period, the institute studied a broad range of agricultural topics, gaining international reputation, with 32 research centers throughout the Belgian Congo and Rwanda-Urundi. By 1959, the scientific research department in Yangambi was made up of the divisions Climatology, Plant physiology, Agricultural engineering and mechanics, Zootechnics, Hydrobiology, Agricultural economics and a diverse range of research into specific crops.

The indigenous peasantry programme was intended to increase the living conditions of the traditional rural communities, but critics state that the programme was mainly developed as a solution for the increasing soil depletion due to excessively intense cultivation and inadequate soil management. However, the paysannats programme was designed to be flexible and the implementation varied based on the geographic regions and districts. The institute has also been criticized for concentrating on large-scale agriculture mainly focused on the production of crops suited for export markets.

Two years after independence, on 31 December 1962, the INÉAC changed its name into the National Institute of Agronomic Studies and Research (INERA; Institut National des Etudes et Recherches Agronomique). Still in Yangambi, the Congo Crisis led to the institute's headquarters being gradually transferred to Kinshasa, an operation completed in 1971. INERA in Yangambi remained as a research center linked to Kinshasa, with the Faculty Institute of Agricultural Sciences of Yangambi (IFA-Yangambi) being created in parallel.

== Other Research ==
The center developed a number of varieties of soybeans for use in different parts of the country. Early-maturing varieties yielded over 1,200 kg/ha of soybeans. Field trials showed that inoculation could increase yields by 80% to 300%. In the 1950s INÉAC researchers discovered the 'Yangambi km 5' (AAA) dessert banana. This variety yields large numbers of small fruit with an excellent taste, is productive even on poor soils and is resistant to black leaf streak disease. There is some evidence that this cultivar may have originated in southern Thailand, introduced to the Kilo-Moto region in northeastern Congo and then brought to Yangambi before World War II.

== Présidents-directeurs généraux ==
- 1934-1934: Pierre Ryckmans (was appointed Governor-General of the Belgian Congo later that year)
- 1949–1962 : Floribert Jurion

== Sources ==
- "A rational organisation of agriculture? Theory and practice". Belgian State Archives.
- Corley, R. H. V.; Tinker, P. B. H. (2008). The Oil Palm. John Wiley & Sons. ISBN 978-0-470-75036-0.
- De Langhe, Edmond (June 2005). "The story behind the name 'Yangabi km 5'". Infomusa: The International Journal on Banana and Plantain. 14 (1). ISSN 1023-0076.
- Shurtleff, William; Aoyagi, Akiko (2009). History of Soybeans and Soyfoods in Africa (1857–2009): Extensively Annotated Bibliography and Sourcebook. Soyinfo Center. ISBN 978-1-928914-25-9.
- Henry, J.M. (1987). Floribert Jurion et l'Institut National pour l'Etude Agronomique du Congo Belge (INEAC). Musée Royal de l'Afrique Centrale.
