= Congolese Alliance of Christian Democrats =

Political party in the Democratic Republic of the Congo

The Congolese Alliance of Christian Democrats (abbreviated ACDC; French: Alliance Congolaise des Démocrates Chrétiens) was a political party in the Democratic Republic of Congo. The party won 4 out of 500 seats in the National Assembly in the 2006 parliamentary elections. They won one seat in the 2011 parliamentary elections.
