= Adam Bombolé =

Politician of the Democratic Republic of the Congo

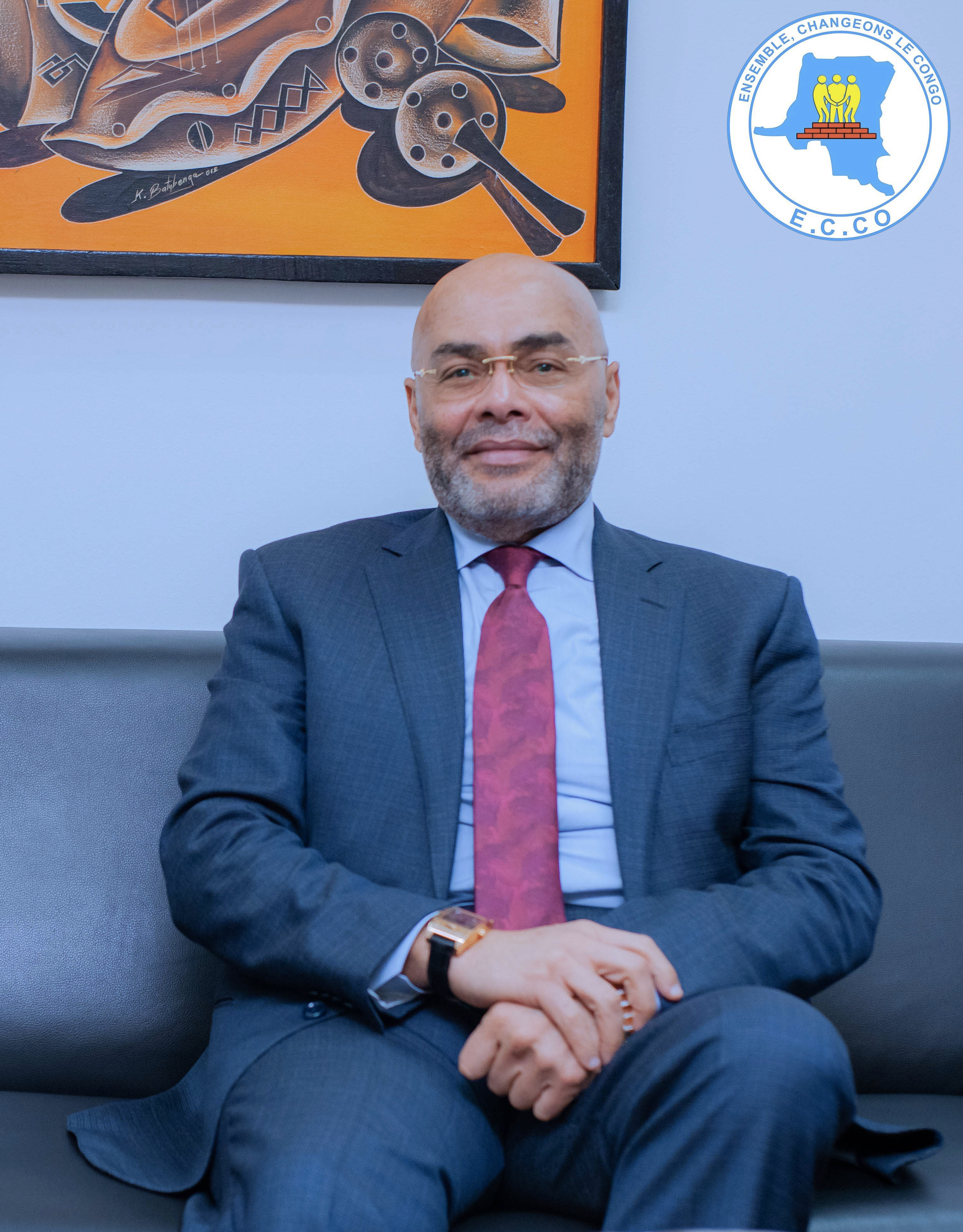
Adam Bombole Intole

Adam Bombolé Intole (born 18 March 1957 in Coquilhatville, Belgian Congo) is a politician in the Democratic Republic of the Congo and was a candidate in the 2011 presidential election.

Bombolé is also a member of the political bureau for Together for Change, the opposition political coalition formed by former governor of Katanga Moïse Katumbi to support his presidential bid in the upcoming 2018 presidential election.

== Sources ==
- Adam Bombolé Intole
