= Mbole–Enya languages =

Mbole–Enya
- Linguistic classification: Niger–Congo?: Atlantic–Congo; Benue–Congo; Southern Bantoid; Bantu (Zone D.10); Mbole–Enya

Language codes
- ISO 639-3: –
- Glottolog: None

The Mbole–Enya languages are a clade of Bantu languages coded Zone D.10 in Guthrie's classification. According to Nurse & Philippson (2003), apart possibly from Lengola the languages form a valid node. The other languages are:

Enya–Zura, Mbole, Mituku

Nyali languages (D.33) may also belong. Lengola is part of the Lebonya proposal.
