= Ngando Pickett =

- Born: Yaoundé
- Other names: Henry Mouyebe
- Known for: Football mascot

Henry Mouyebe, better known as Ngando Pickett is a high-profile Cameroonian football fan. He is recognisable at Cameroon national football games for his painted body and musical displays.

His friends named him after Wilson Pickett as he was an accomplished dancer.

In May 2010, sports manufacturer Puma SE used his image in a high-profile advertising campaign without his permission. Pickett is now contemplating legal action against Puma. Speaking of the incident he said "I am extremely embarrassed as my image is everywhere, I have rights to my image on my person. I have nothing with Puma. Puma has no right to use my picture."
