= Bango language =

Bantu language of DR Congo

Bango
- Native to: DR Congo
- Ethnicity: Babango
- Native speakers: (2,600 cited 2000)
- Language family: Niger–Congo?: Atlantic–Congo; Benue–Congo; Bantoid; Bantu (Zone C.40); Boan; Bomokandian; Bwa; Bango

Language codes
- ISO 639-3: bbm
- Glottolog: baba1263
- Guthrie code: C.441

Bango (Mobango, Babango), is a Bantu language spoken in the Democratic Republic of Congo. Ethnologue suggests it may be a dialect of Budza, but Nurse & Philippson (2003) list it as one of the Bwa languages.
