= Boa people =

Baboa
Total population
- 900,000

Regions with significant populations
- Bas-Uele District, Democratic Republic of the Congo: located near the congo river.

Languages
- Bwa

The Boa people or Baboa people (singular Boa, also Ababua, Ababwa, Babua, Babwa, Bwa) are an ethnic group in the Democratic Republic of the Congo. They speak the Bwa language.

The Baboa live in the savanna region in the north of the Democratic Republic of the Congo. They are in close contact with the Mangbetu and Zande peoples. Most of the inhabitants of the Bas-Uele District, with a population of 900,000 in 2007, are Boa. They live mainly through subsistence farming and hunting, with some river commerce.

The Baboa are known for their masks, which are thought to be used to enhance a warrior's courage before battle and in ceremonies to celebrate victories. The Boa carve statues designed to ward off evil. They also make harps where the neck has a carved human head, or the whole body represents a male or female figure. Between 1903 and 1910 the Baboa were in rebellion against the Belgian colonial occupiers of the region.
