= Mbesa language =

Bantu language of the Democratic Republic of the Congo

Mbesa
- Native to: Democratic Republic of the Congo
- Native speakers: 8,400 (2002)
- Language family: Niger–Congo?: Atlantic–Congo; Benue–Congo; Bantoid; Bantu (Zone C); Soko–Kele (C.50–60); Mbesa

Language codes
- ISO 639-3: zms
- Glottolog: mbes1238
- Guthrie code: C.51

Mbesa is a Bantu language of the Democratic Republic of the Congo.
