= Bati–Angba languages =

Clade of Bantu languages

Bati–Angba
- Bwa
- Linguistic classification: Niger–Congo?: Atlantic–Congo languages; Benue–Congo languages; Southern Bantoid languages; Bantu (Zone C.40); Boan; Bomokandian; Bati–Angba

Language codes
- ISO 639-3: –
- Glottolog: late1250

The Bati–Angba or Bwa languages are a clade of Bantu languages, about half of Zone C.40 in Guthrie's classification. According to Nurse & Philippson (2003), these languages form a valid node. They are:

Bwa (Yewu, Benge–Baati) – Pagibete, Kango, Bango (Babango), Ngelima (Angba)

In addition, Nurse & Philippson report that Bati–Angba may be a part of Komo–Bira languages. The proposal is called Boan.
