= Mituku language =

Bantu language spoken in DR Congo

Mituku
- Kinya-Mituku
- Native to: DR Congo
- Region: Orientale Province
- Native speakers: (51,000 cited 2000)
- Language family: Niger–Congo?: Atlantic–Congo; Benue–Congo; Bantoid; Bantu (Zone D); Mbole–Enya (D.10); Mituku
- Dialects: Mokpá

Language codes
- ISO 639-3: zmq
- Glottolog: mitu1242
- Guthrie code: D.13

Mituku (also known as Kinya-Mituku or Metoko) is a Bantu language of the Democratic Republic of the Congo. The Mokpá dialect is distinct.

== Phonology ==
=== Tones ===
It is a tonal language with four tones: high, low, falling and rising. Downstep can occur between two high tones or between a high and falling tone. A contour (rising or falling) tone can occur on a vowel if and only if the vowel is the realization of two underlying vowels.
