= Weko =

Coordinates: 1.01667°N 24.51667°E

Weko is a Turumbu village in the Democratic Republic of the Congo. It is located 30 km to the north of Yangambi town. The territory of Weko covers an area of about 30 000 ha. In Weko, the main livelihoods are shifting cultivation, hunting, fishing, canoe construction and gold mining. The village of Weko provides around 66% of the wildmeat biomass sold in the town of Yangambi - an equivalent of about 97.6 tons of smoked meat per year. Despite this large catch, food security is poor because most of the hunting occurs for commercial purposes, with more than 80% of the biomass being sold to the Yangambi market. The main species sold are small monkeys and red duikers, followed by blue duikers, bush pigs and brush tailed porcupines.
