= Ngelima language =

Bantu language spoken in DRC

Ngelima
- Angba
- Native to: DR Congo
- Native speakers: (14,000 cited 2000)
- Language family: Niger–Congo?: Atlantic–Congo; Benue–Congo; Bantoid; Bantu (Zone C.40); Boan; Bomokandian; Bwa; Ngelima
- Dialects: Beo; Buru (Boro); Tungu; Hanga

Language codes
- ISO 639-3: agh
- Glottolog: ngel1238
- Guthrie code: C.45

Ngelima, or Angba (Leangba), is a Bantu language spoken in the Democratic Republic of Congo. The four dialects (Beo, Buru (Boro), Tungu, Hanga) are quite distinct, and may be separate languages.
