= John P. Carrington =

Financial journalist (1941–2022)

John Plowden Carrington (1941–2022) was a journalist, financier and horse-racing enthusiast.
