= François Nicéphore Kakese =

Democratic Republic of the Congo politician

François Nicéphore Kakese Malela (born 11 May 1956 in Kifuza, Bandundu) is a politician in the Democratic Republic of the Congo. He is president of the Union pour le réveil et le développement du Congo (URDC) and was a candidate in the 2011 presidential election.
