= Opala, Democratic Republic of the Congo =

Opala
- Commune
- Location within Democratic Republic of the Congo
- Coordinates: 0.509313°S 24.229059°E
- Country: DR Congo
- Province: Tshopo
- Territory: Opala

Population
  - Total: 15,569
- Time zone: UTC+2 (CAT)
- Climate: Af
- National language: Lingala

Opala is a town in the Tshopo Province of the Democratic Republic of the Congo. It is the administrative center of the Opala Sector and of the Opala Territory. The town lies on the left bank of the Lomami River. It is surrounded by forests and it is an enclosed city.
