= Innovative Forces for Union and Solidarity =

Political party in the Democratic Republic of the Congo

See Fonus for the Swedish funeral cooperative.

Forces for Renovation for Union and Solidarity (French Forces Novatrices pour l'Union et la Solidarité) (FONUS), is a political party in the Democratic Republic of Congo. It is described as a "non-armed opposition" party.

Its presidential candidate in the 2006 general election was Joseph Olengankoy Mukundji, who received 102,186 votes or 0.60% of total votes cast.

In the same election, the party elected a deputy in the 500-seat National Assembly of the Democratic Republic of the Congo, Pascal Kamba Mandungu, with 4,611 votes. He represents the multi-member constituency of Kinshasa 2 in the city of Kinshasa.

== See also ==
- Politics of the Democratic Republic of the Congo
- List of political parties in the Democratic Republic of the Congo
