= Yangambi =

- Commune
- Location within Democratic Republic of the Congo
- Coordinates: 0°45′56″N 24°28′25″E
- Country: DR Congo
- Province: Tshopo
- Territory: Isangi
- Time zone: UTC+2 (CAT)
- Climate: Af
- National language: Lingala

Yangambi is a town in Isangi territory of Tshopo province, Democratic Republic of the Congo.

== Location ==
Yangambi is on the north side of the Congo River and lies on the R408 road which connects it to Kisangani 100 kilometers to the east. This road is unpaved, rarely used in the rainy season and difficult to use at all times of the year. The roads linking Yangambi to Weko and Isangi are also very poor. The river provides an alternative transport route. The town was once served by the small Yangambi Airport.

== Weather ==
Mean annual rainfall is 1,835 millimetres (72.2 in). August is the wettest month and February the driest. The skies tend to be partly cloudy even during the drier seasons.

== Yangambi Biosphere Reserve ==
235,000 hectares of forest around Yangambi were declared a Biosphere Reserve in 1976, part of UNESCO’s Man and the Biosphere Programme (MAB).

The Yangambi Biosphere Reserve comprises secondary forests with Pycnanthus angolensis and Fagara macrophylla, semi deciduous secondary rain forests, rain forests with Gilbertiodendron dewevrei, climax forests with Brachystegia laurentii and marshland forests.

The site is very important from a biodiversity point of view since it hosts endangered tree species, such as Afrormosia (Pericopsis elata). It was also once home to elephants (Loxodonta africana cyclotis), but they have now disappeared locally. In 2018, a study confirmed the presence of Common Chimpanzees (Pan troglodytes) in the area.

== Research center ==
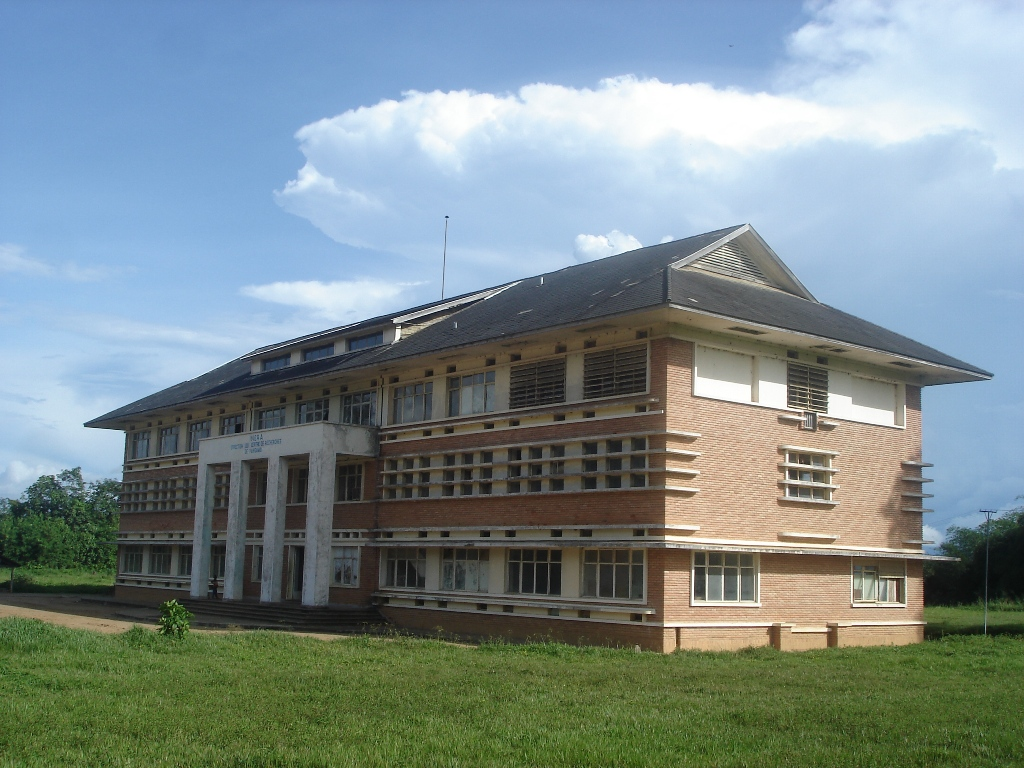
Modern-day view of the colonial-era INEAC facility at Yangambi

During the colonial era, Yangambi was home to the Institut national pour les études agronomiques du Congo belge (INEAC), one of the world's most important tropical agriculture and forestry research centers.

The INEAC experimental fields and laboratories were built along a road parallel to the north bank of the Congo river, and along a road stretching northward from the river for about 25 kilometres (16 mi). In the 1930s researchers at INEAC found the relationship between the tenera, dura and pisifera oil palms. Oil palms have relatively low yield around Yangambi compared to coastal regions. This appears to be due to the lower night temperatures in the continental interior, which have a mean minimum at Yangambi of around 20 °C (68 °F).

The center developed a number of varieties of soy beans for use in different parts of the country. Early-maturing varieties yielded over 1,200 kg/ha of soybeans. Field trials showed that inoculation could increase yields by 80% to 300%. In the 1950s INEAC researchers discovered the 'Yangambi km 5' (AAA) dessert banana. This variety yields large numbers of small fruit with an excellent taste, is productive even on poor soils and is resistant to black leaf streak disease. There is some evidence that this cultivar may have originated in southern Thailand, introduced to the Kilo-Moto region in northeastern Congo and then brought to Yangambi before World War II.

After independence, the INEAC became the National Institute of Agronomic Studies and Research (INERA), a Congolese institution. However, decades of conflict and political instability led to a progressive decline of Yangambi's research station.

== Recent developments ==
Since 2017, with funding from the European Union, the Center for International Forestry Research (CIFOR) and several international and Congolese partners are conducting efforts to make of Yangambi's landscape a world-class hub for development, science, and conservation. Recent initiatives include restoration of degraded land, new infrastructure, research on endangered flora and fauna, support to local entrepreneurs, and training of local forest experts.

In 2018, the Meise Botanic Garden and INERA renovated Yangambi's herbarium, which has a collection of 150,000 dried plant specimens.

In 2019, the Royal Museum for Central Africa (RMCA) launched a new wood biology laboratory in Yangambi, the first of its kind in Sub-Saharan Africa.

Since 2020, Yangambi hosts the Congo Basin's first Eddy covariance flux tower, installed by Ghent University.

== Sources ==
- "Carte des Districts et Territoires de l'ORIENTALE" (PDF). Reliefweb. October 2002.
- Corley, R. H. V.; Tinker, P. B. H. (2008). The Oil Palm. John Wiley & Sons. ISBN 978-0-470-75036-0.
- De Langhe, Edmond (June 2005). "The story behind the name 'Yangabi km 5'". Infomusa: The International Journal on Banana and Plantain. 14 (1). ISSN 1023-0076.
- Frankham, Richard; Ballou, Jonathan D.; Briscoe, David Anthony (2004). A primer of conservation genetics. Cambridge University Press. ISBN 978-0-521-53827-5.
- Littell, Eliakim; Littell, Robert S. (1889). The living age ..., Volume 181. Littell, son & company.
- Shurtleff, William; Aoyagi, Akiko (2009). History of Soybeans and Soyfoods in Africa (1857-2009): Extensively Annotated Bibliography and Sourcebook. Soyinfo Center. ISBN 978-1-928914-25-9.
- Tshibaka, Tshikala B. (1989). Food production in a land-surplus, labor-scarce economy: the Zairian Basin, Volume 1. Intl Food Policy Res Inst. ISBN 978-0-89629-076-1.
- Tshibaka, Tshikala B. (1992). Labor in the rural household economy of the Zairian basin. Intl Food Policy Res Inst. ISBN 978-0-89629-093-8.
- van Vliet, Nathalie; Muhindo, Jonas; Kambale Nyumu, Jonas; Mushagalusa, Olivier; Nasi, Robert (2018). "Mammal Depletion Processes as Evidenced From Spatially Explicit and Temporal Local Ecological Knowledge". Tropical Conservation Science. 11. 1940082918799494. doi:10.1177/1940082918799494. ISSN 1940-0829.
