= Jean Andeka =

Congolese politician

Jean Andeka Djamba (born in Gombe) is a politician in the Democratic Republic of the Congo and was a candidate in the 2011 presidential election. He is a practicing lawyer in Gombe, graduated from the University of Kinshasa, and was the first candidate to file for election.

== Sources ==
- Jean Andeka
