= Ngando language =

Bantu language spoken in DR Congo

Ngando
- Longandu
- Native to: DR Congo
- Ethnicity: Ngando
- Native speakers: (220,000 cited 1995) (presumably includes 55,000 speakers (1993) of Lalia dialect)
- Language family: Niger–Congo?: Atlantic–Congo; Benue–Congo; Bantoid; Bantu (Zone C); Soko–Kele (C.50–60); Ngando

Language codes
- ISO 639-3: nxd – inclusive code Individual code: lal – Lalia
- Glottolog: ngan1302
- Guthrie code: C.63, 62

Ngando is a Bantu language in the Soko-Kele languages group that is spoken by the Ngando people in the Democratic Republic of the Congo.

== Bibliography ==
- Daiji Kimura (2023). Lexique longando [A Ngando glossary]. Research Institute for Languages and Cultures of Asia and Africa. ISBN 9784863373945.
