= Soko languages =

Clade of Bantu languages

Soko
- Soko–Kele
- Linguistic classification: Niger–Congo?: Atlantic–Congo; Benue–Congo; Southern Bantoid; Bantu (Zone C.50–60); Bangi–Tetela?; Soko

Language codes
- ISO 639-3: –
- Glottolog: kele1261

The Soko or Soko–Kele languages are a clade of Bantu languages coded Zone C.50–60 in Guthrie's classification. According to Nurse & Philippson (2003), apart from Mongo (Nkundo), the languages form a valid node. They are:

(C50) Mbesa, Soko (So), Poke, Lombo, Kele (Lokele, incl. Foma); (C60) Ngando (incl. Lalia)

Maho (2009) adds Likile and Linga to C50. Ethnologue notes a Bantu but otherwise unclassified Moingi language on the river in the middle of Soko–Kele territory.
