= Lomami Company =

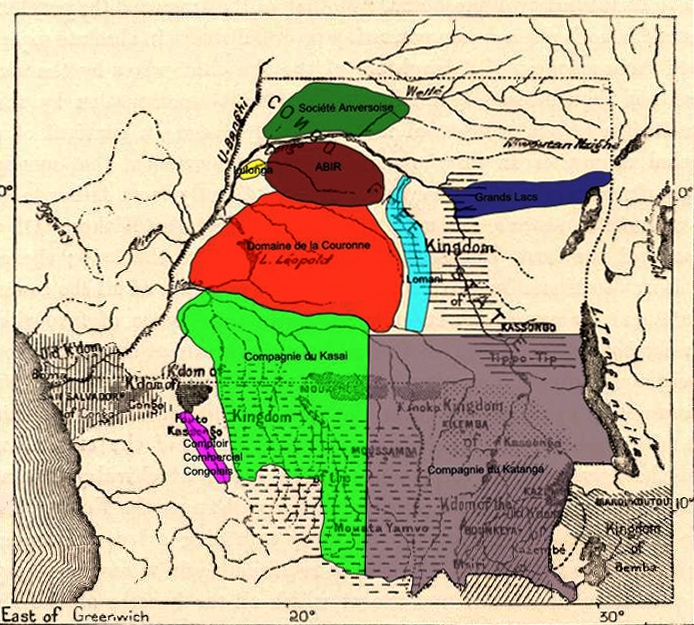
Congo Free State concession companies, Lomani Company shown in light blue

The Lomani Company was a concession company of the Congo Free State. In the colonial era, the Lomami Company forced the people of the Lomami River region from Opala and Lokilo down to Ilambi to collect large amounts of rubber. The Mbole people of the region vividly described their view of the effect of this work with the phrase wando wo limolo, meaning "tax-caused loss of weight".

== Bibliography ==
- Harms, Robert (1975), "The End of Red Rubber: A Reassessment", The Journal of African History, 16 (1): 73–88, doi:10.1017/S0021853700014110, JSTOR 181099
- Likaka, Osumaka (2009). Naming colonialism: history and collective memory in the Congo, 1870-1960. University of Wisconsin Press. ISBN 978-0-299-23364-8.
