= Ngando people =

Regions with significant populations
- Democratic Republic of the Congo: 500,000

Languages
- Longando language

The Ngando people (or Bongando, Ngandu) are Bantu subsistence farmers who live in eastern part of Équateur and the western part of Orientale province in the Democratic Republic of the Congo.

== Population ==
The Bongado are a branch of the Mongo cluster, with an estimated population in 1990 of 450,000-500,000. They speak Longando in the village setting; almost all will also use the Lingala language in other settings. Longando is related to the Lalia language. Ethnologue reports that the Ngando live in the Maringa River area, north of Ikela, and had a population of 220,000 in 1995.

== Location and economy ==
The Bongando live in the tropical rain forest of the Congo Basin. Daily temperatures range from 20 °C (68 °F) to 30 °C (86 °F) and annual rainfall is about 2,000 millimetres (79 in). The Bongando's staple crop is cassava, and they also grow bananas, yams, maize, rice and some vegetables. Their only cash crop is coffee, introduced in the 1960s. They raise goats, pigs, chickens, and ducks, and supplement their diet through hunting, fishing, and gathering.

The Bongando have traditionally seen bonobos as human beings rather than animals. However, due to economic stress from political disorders followed by civil wars in the 1992-2005 period and to social and cultural interchanges with other ethnic groups, this perception has changed. The younger Bongando will now sometimes hunt bonobos as bushmeat.

== Settlements ==
Bongando settlements are typically scattered along the road in an open area 10 metres (33 ft) to 30 metres (98 ft) wide that contains the cassava and coffee fields. Behind the fields, there is some secondary forest and then huge expanses of primary forest. The Bongando have a patrilineal lineage system, and wives come to live near their husband's family. Close relatives usually live close together.
