= Soko language =

Bantu language spoken in DR Congo

Soko
- So
- Native to: Democratic Republic of the Congo
- Native speakers: (6,000 cited 1971)
- Language family: Niger–Congo?: Atlantic–Congo; Benue–Congo; Bantoid; Bantu (Zone C); Soko–Kele (C.50–60); Soko

Language codes
- ISO 639-3: soc
- Glottolog: sode1235
- Guthrie code: C.52

Soko, or So (also Eso, Gesogo, Heso, Soa) is a language spoken, as of 1971, by about 6,000 people in the Orientale Province, north of Basoko in the Democratic Republic of the Congo.
