= Mbole people =

Ethnic group in eastern Democratic Republic of the Congo

Mbole
Regions with significant populations
- Orientale Province, Democratic Republic of the Congo: 100,000

Languages
- Mbole language

Related ethnic groups
- Mongo, Anamongo

The Mbole people are an ethnic group of about 150,000 people living in the Orientale Province, southwest of Kisangani in the Democratic Republic of the Congo. The Mbole were previously referred to as Bambole.

== Origins ==
The Mbole language belongs to the Mongo group of Bantu languages. The Mbole culture is close to that of the Mongo people and related to those of the Yela and Pere peoples. They live in the equatorial forest on both sides of the Lomami River. They once lived to the north of the Congo River. They crossed this river upstream from the point where the Lomami joins the Congo, near present-day Basoko, and then moved south to their present location. They split into five smaller groups in the 18th century due to pressure from the Bombesa people.

During the colonial era of the Belgian Congo, the Mbole were active in attacking the colonial factories in Lokilo. They called the Belgians atama-atama, or slave traders, and made no distinction between the Belgians and the earlier Arab slave traders. The Lomami Company forced the Mbole to collect large amounts of rubber. They vividly described their view of the effect of this work with the phrase wando wo limolo, meaning "tax-caused loss of weight".

== Economy and Agriculture ==
The Mbole rely primarily on agriculture. They also gather, fish, and hunt for food. The gathering of nuts is done by men. The Mbole women grow manioc, bananas and rice and raise ducks, chickens and goats. The men hunt or trap game, and use nets to catch fish in the river. Local weavers and blacksmiths provide most of artifacts needed for daily life. Both men and women practice weaving, men making fish traps and wall and roof mats, and women making sleeping mats, small rectangular mats and baskets. They also produce palm oil which is handled by women in the society.

Men typically move to their wife's village on marriage. Villages are headed by a chief who has reached a senior position in the Lilwa society, which educates young men and some women and conducts initiation ceremonies. A group of villages may elect an area chief to represent them in a matter of shared concern, but villages are otherwise autonomous.

The Mbole practice metal-work, wood-work, wicker-work, weaving of raffia, and carving of ivory. Blacksmiths produce tools and weapons such as knives, as well as armbands and ankle bands. Items that are made out of wood consist of statues, masks, stools, shields, and musical instruments such as drums. The Mbole weave raffia as a form of fabric. Baskets, shields and mats are made out of wicker. They use ivory and horns for the production of aerophones.

== Culture ==
The Mbole can be subdivided into families or clans. Smaller clans are called lentono and the head of the clan is called a wilangi. A major lineage is called a okenge and the head of these are called ise l'okenge. A clan or family can be as large as several villages or as small as just one village.

The Lilwa society teaches both morality and religion. Women and elders, both living and dead, are to be respected. Theft, adultery and lying are prohibited. A person who breaks the law is subject to public reprimand and may suffer further punishment. In the most severe cases the wrong-doer is hung and buried in an unmarked grave. Mbole wooden carvings often represent these individuals with sunken faces, concave torsos and ropes around their necks. One example of a crime punishable by death is that of revealing the secrets of initiation. The image serves as an example of what will happen to the person who breaks the laws.

The Lilwa society has four levels. The highest are the Isoya, the religious leaders. The wives of the Isoya are usually initiated into the Lilwa society and wield considerable power. When an Isoya dies he is buried in a tree and his house is left empty as a reminder that he is still present in the community. The Mbole make wooden figures that are used in healing ceremonies or that represent ancestors. They also make elaborate mats, and make brass bracelets of great beauty.

== Religion ==
Mbole believe in a great God or creator that is believed to be Mongo. However, is seldom mentioned or honored. Spirits are an important aspect of Mbole religion, they believe in good and bad spirits. There isn't much worship of ancestral spirits besides honoring them during funeral ceremonies and a few weeks afterwards. This is so that the soul of the deceased can rest and find peace. They do believe that spirits of ancestors are reborn with their previous characteristics.

The Mbole believe witchcraft and dark magic to be the cause of illness and disasters. They believe that witchcraft can be found in a specific organ called liloka which enables a person to kill or do harm. People protect themselves from witches by mixing the crushed bark from a tree along with other ingredients into a horn that is either hung or buried in front of a residence.

The Mbole also believe that if an individual has a lock of hair or cloth belonging to someone else they can cause illness or pain to that person through their belongings.

== Lilwa Society ==
The Mbole have a secret society of men called lilwa or lilwakoy. The lilwa controls society by punishing those who go against norms or laws that are put in place by the lilwa. Lilwa is necessary for all men of Mbole to be a part of. There are no women except for a few occasions where high ranking individuals in lilwa society appoint their daughters to be a part of lilwa. Lilwa consists of four hierarchical classes which can be obtained through initiations.

The lowest class is likomela which all men become a part of through initiation. Some men stay in this class their whole lives instead of progressing. Initiation into the likomela class begins when a young male is considered socially mature.

Initiation takes place in liala li kumi which is a location outside of the village, inside of the forest, and near a river. This is also the location where ritual gatherings of the lilwa takes place. The forest is cleared out for this space and includes shelter where the initiates stay for two weeks before they are initiated. During initiation, all lilwa members and initiates are present in the liala li kumi and are completely nude. When the candidates enter liala li kumi they must go through several tortures which could include things such as whippings or beatings, and getting pepper on their bodies. Once they have endured this they are led to the top of a termite mound where they are given a banana stalk with the hole in the center and told it is a woman they are to sleep with. Then a plant infusion is poured into the initiate's eyes which creates a burning sensation. This is alleviated by another plant infusion. This process is symbolic of opening eyes to the secrets of lilwa.

Initiation rites are concluded by festivities that include eating, drinking, and dancing. All members of lilwa participate in this. After initiation, new members stay in the liala li kumi for two weeks where they are taught customs in the form of stories. They focus on ideas that are central to lilwa society such as not killing without reason, not taking another man's wife, not to steal, respect for tradition and elders, and the importance of keeping secrets of lilwa and the punishment that would be inflicted on traitors.

The second class of men consists of men that specialize in ritual functions for lilwa such as singers, sculptors, blacksmiths, ritual assistants, onanga a lilwa who are responsible for initiation rites and instruction of newly initiated men, and ikoni koy who are executioners that put criminals to death by hanging.

The third class of lilwa society consists of Kanda who are therapists. They can detect and remove illnesses, assist governing groups, and settle disputes.

The highest order of lilwa society is called Yeni. In order to reach this position one must give great offerings to officiates such as chicken, goats, and smoked meat that is compensation for ritual services. They must also offer one of their children to be hanged in great secrecy. After their death, a sculptor will carve a wooden statue of the victim.

A Yeni has the ability to initiate his daughter into lilwa society. In order to do this, they must offer goods to the wilangi. After the daughter has passed through initiation rites she has earned the title of lumongo and is considered a male. At this point the wilangi gives the lumongo red and white powder to be used for skincare, leopard teeth to be worn as a necklace, a staff that represents male genitals and her status as a male, and a female servant called an opika that assists her in trips to lilwa rites. The lumongo is then a part of the Yeni, the highest class, and can only be married to other Yeni.

== Statues ==
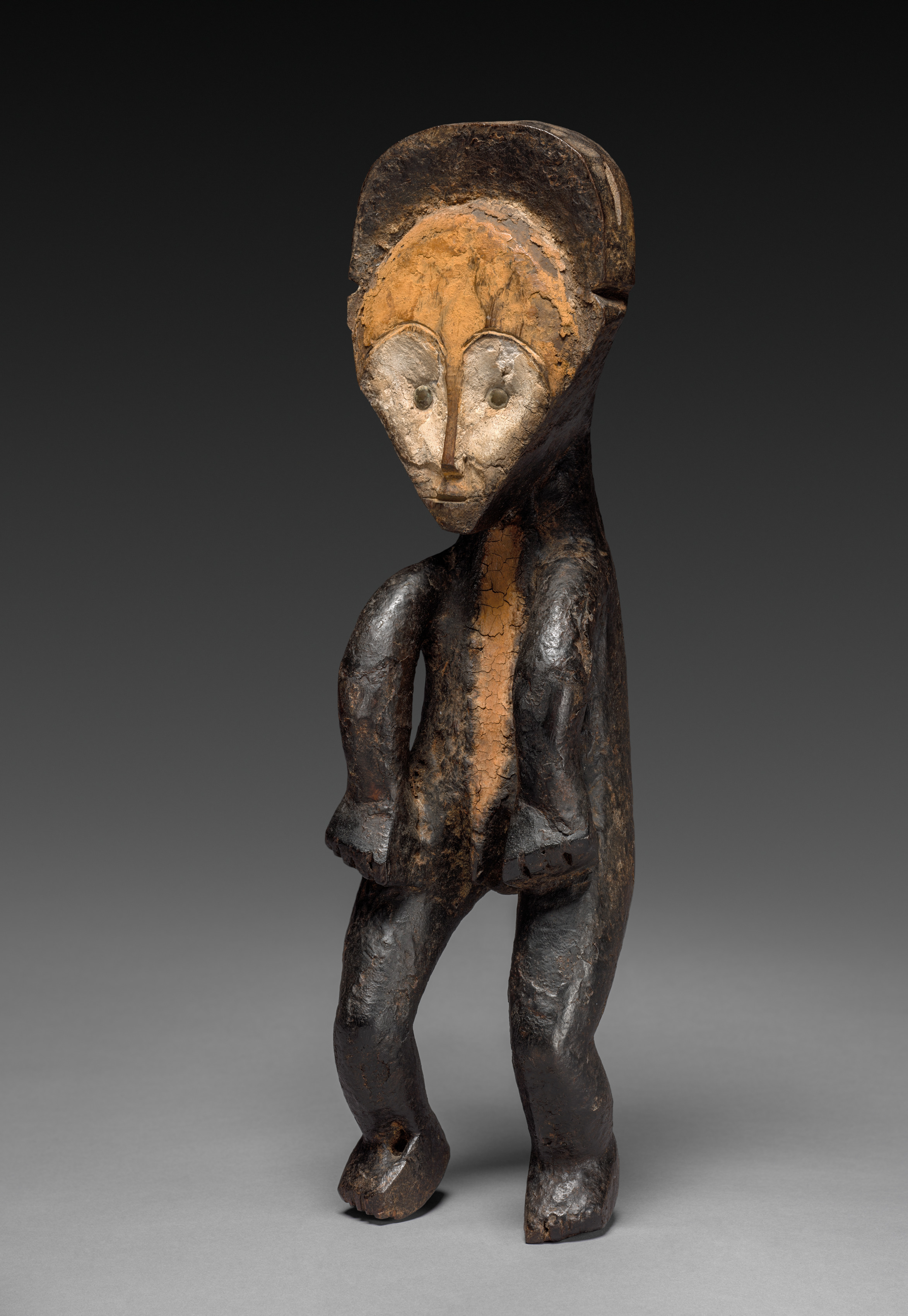
Ofika, Male Figure, believed to be representations of criminals that were put to death for their crimes

Mbole statues are generally characterized as anthropomorphic figures. There are hanging and standing variations. They mostly consist of males, although there are some that are female. The height of these statues range from 20-120 centimeters. The height corresponds to quality, the larger figures are much more detailed, while the smaller figures consist of more simplistic and generalized shapes. The majority are decorated by white or yellow paint on the face and torso. Sometimes there will be a stripe of paint in a line from the neck to the genitals. Red pigment is sometimes applied to the headdress or on the legs from the knees down to the feet. The head is more carefully finished than the rest of the body.

There are a total of 89 statues that can be traced back to Mbole. They can be subdivided into four groups based on the headdresses. The first group consists of the most detailed figures and they have a large semicircle headdress with an upright ridge that runs across the top of the head. The second category of statues are those with a circular headdress which can vary from a crown-like shape to semi-spherical to a funnel shape. The third group contains figures with rectangular or trapezoidal headdresses. The fourth category is made up of figures that do not conform to the rest of Mbole work.

The figures represented are often executed criminals. Statues can also be ritual victims. They are not individualized portraits of the people but are generalized abstractions of particular individuals. They sometimes even carry the name of the individual. They act as a symbol of the fate of traitors and law-breakers and serve as a warning to others. The collection of statues are hidden in the forest where only the wilangi knows the location.

== Masks ==
Mbole masks are rare because they are only used during circumcision ceremonies in the lilwa society. They are generally oval shaped and covered in pigment. The features suggest a human face.
