= Kele people (Congo) =

Kele
Regions with significant populations
- Democratic Republic of the Congo: 160,000

Languages
- Kele language, Kiswahili, Lingala

Related ethnic groups
- Mongo, Anamongo

The Kele people (or Lokele) are a Bantu ethnic group of about 160,000 people, in the Democratic Republic of the Congo. They mainly live on the south bank of the Congo River between Kisangani and Isangi. The Kele are a subgroup of The Mongo people.

== Drum language ==
The Kele were known for their drum language, described by the English missionary John F. Carrington, who spent his life in Africa. His findings were published in his 1949 book The Talking Drums of Africa. The Kele people used drum language for rapid communication between villages. Each village had an expert drummer, and all villagers could understand the drum language. Carrington studied the drum language at a time when it was already falling out of use, and today it is extinct.
