= Kele-Foma language =

Bantu language of DR Congo

Kele
- Lokele
- Native to: Democratic Republic of the Congo
- Region: Kisangani
- Ethnicity: Kele people
- Native speakers: (160,000 cited 1980)
- Language family: Niger–Congo?: Atlantic–Congo; Benue–Congo; Southern Bantoid; Bantu (Zone C); Soko–Kele (C.50–60); Kele
- Dialects: Foma

Language codes
- ISO 639-3: khy – inclusive code Individual code: fom – Foma
- Glottolog: kele1255
- Guthrie code: C.55, 56

The Kele language, or Lokele, is a Bantu language spoken in the Democratic Republic of the Congo by the Kele people.

Foma (Lifoma) is a dialect.
