= Tshopo =

Province of the Democratic Republic of the Congo

Tshopo Province de la Tshopo (French) Mkoa wa Tshopo (Swahili)
- Province
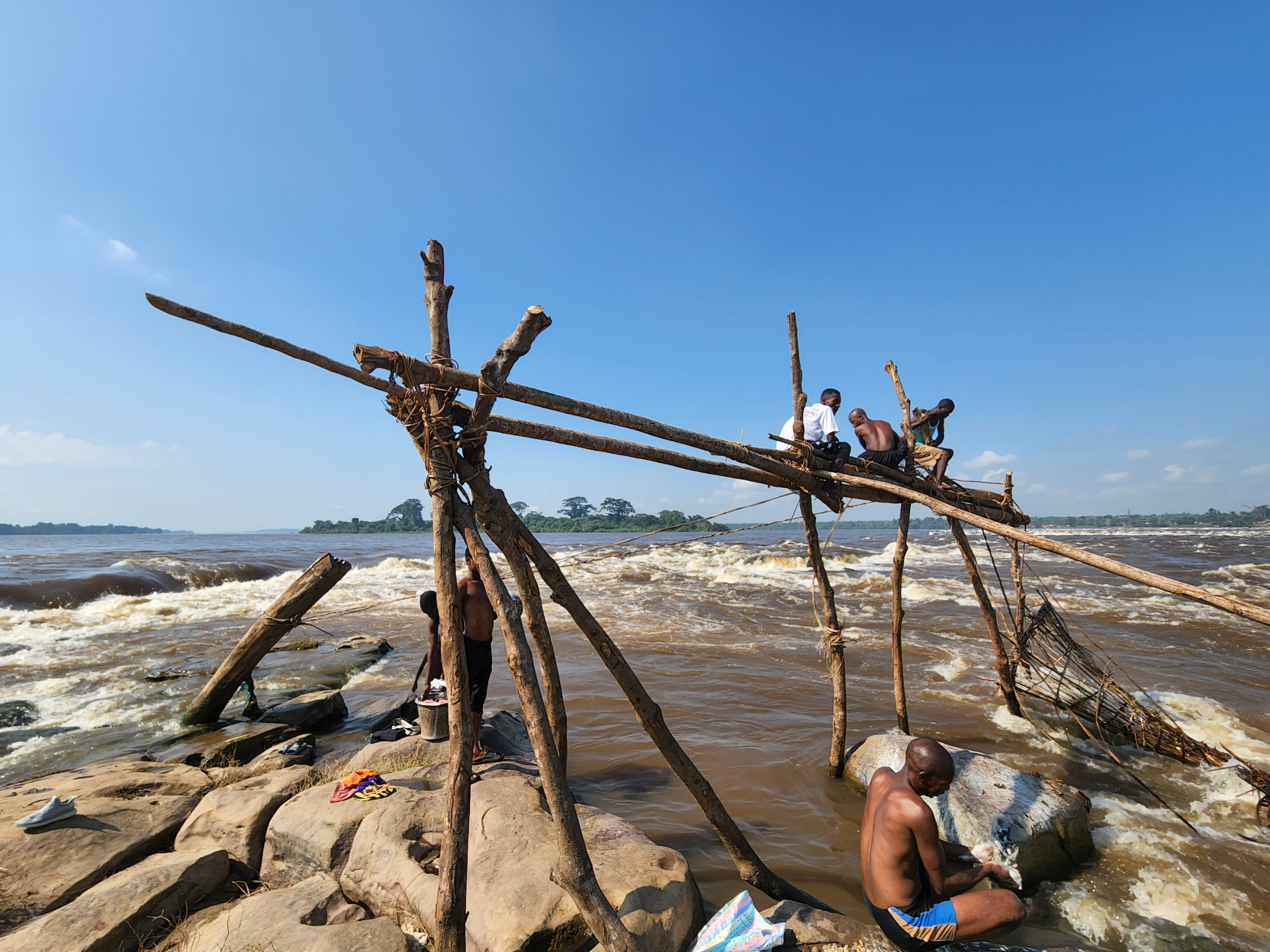
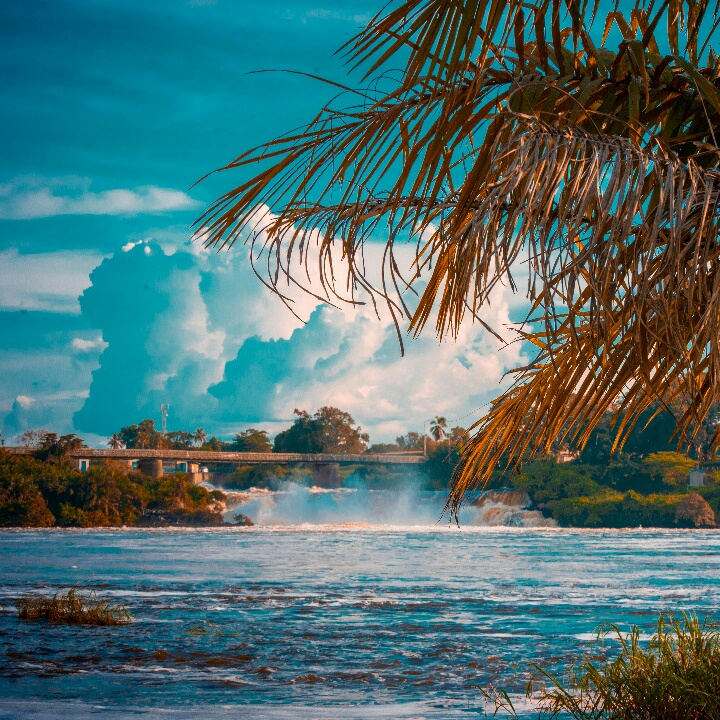
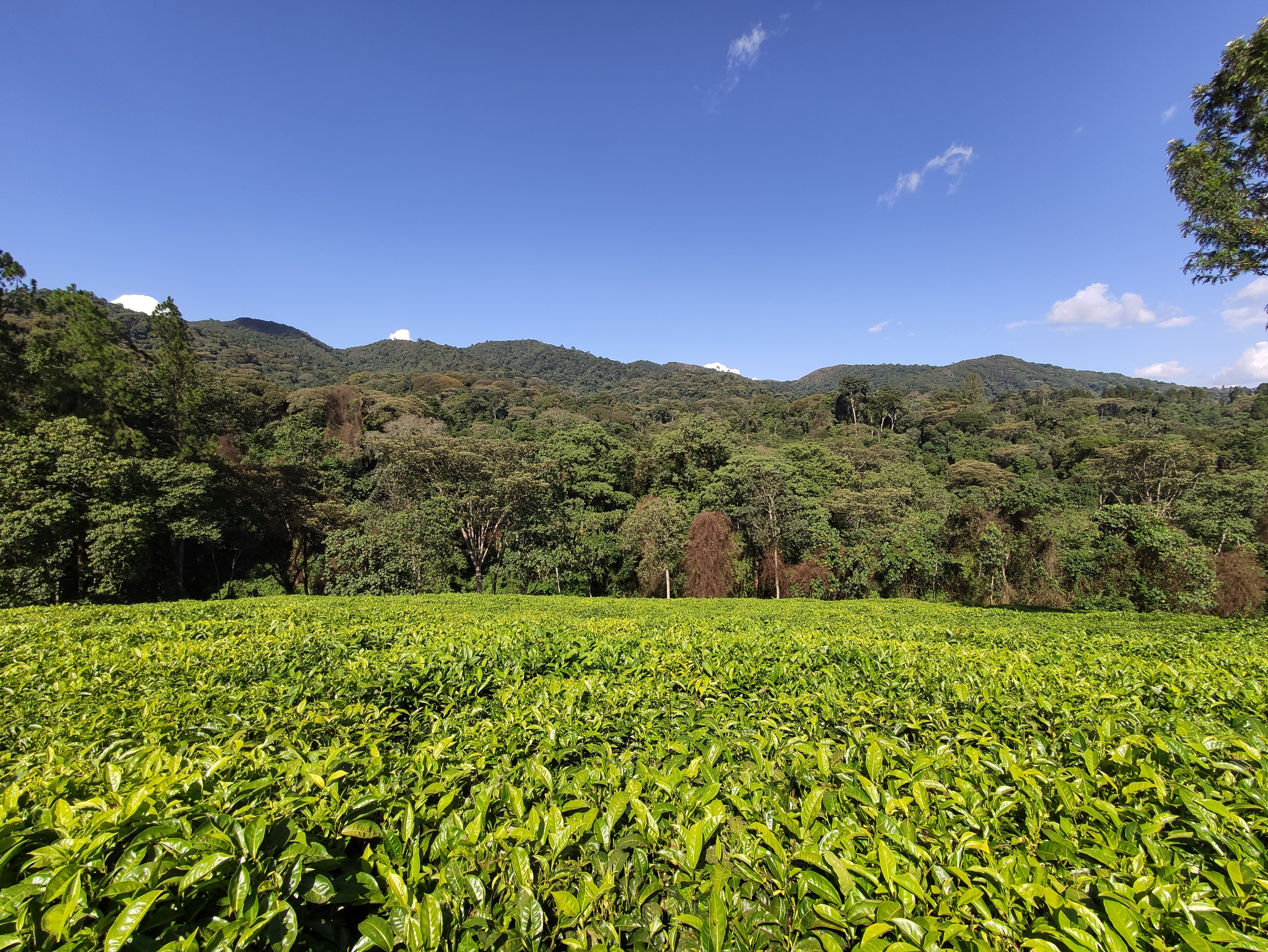
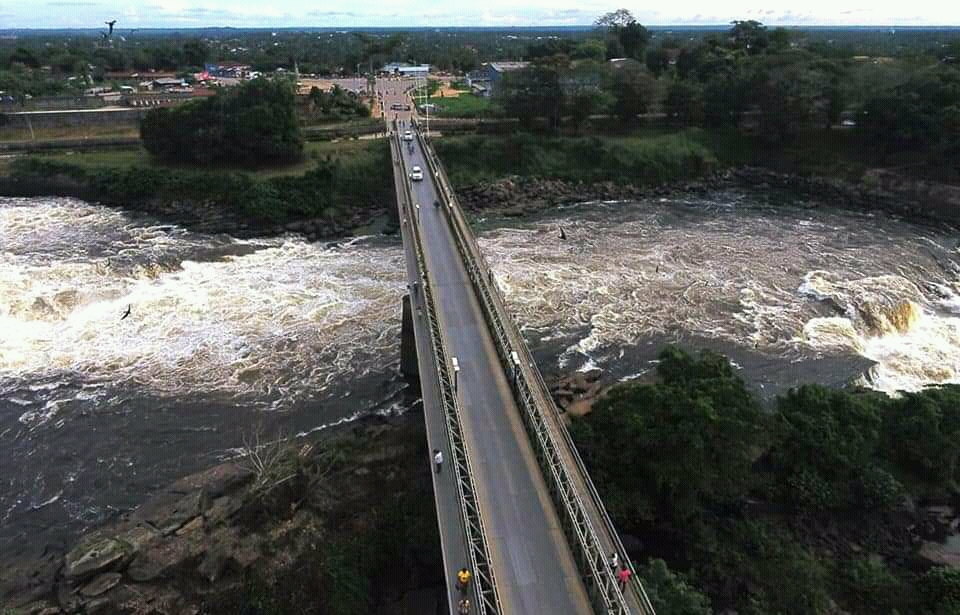
- From Top left to right: Boyoma Falls, Tshopo River Falls, Yangambi Reserve & Tshopo Bridge

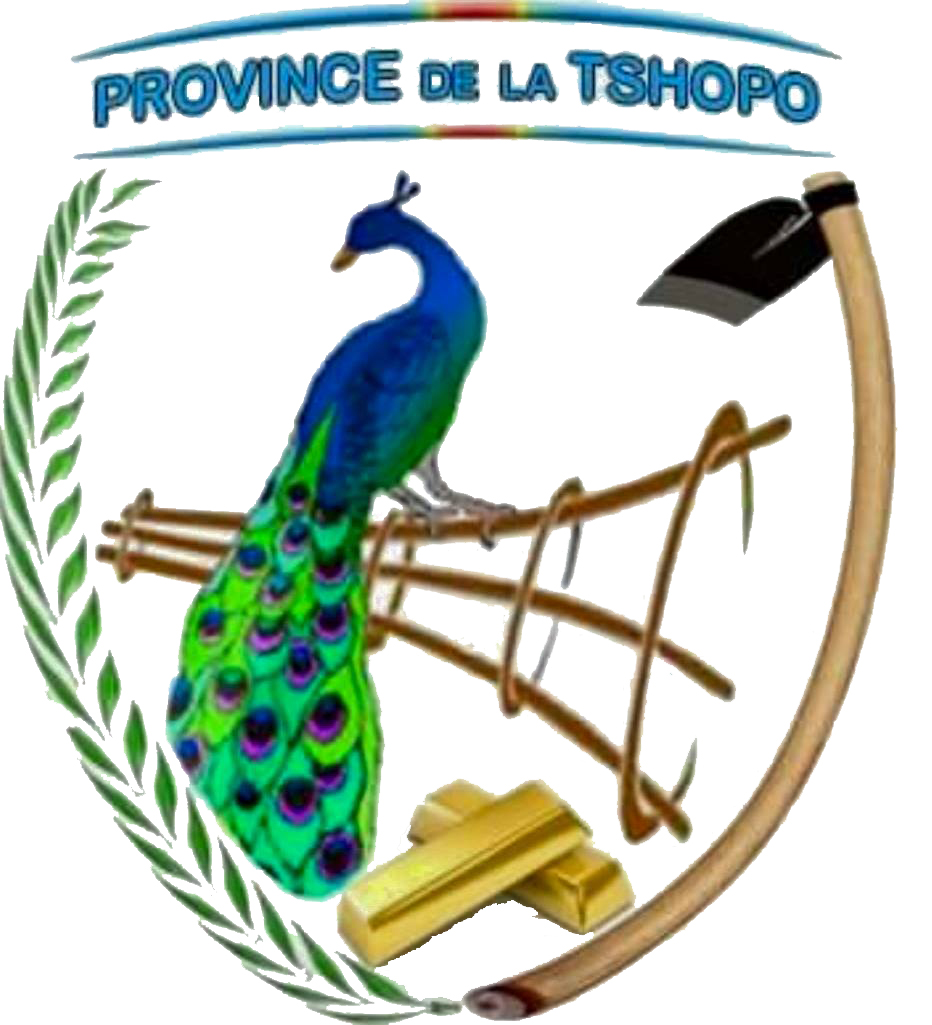
- Seal

- Coordinates: 0°31′N 25°12′E
- Country: Democratic Republic of the Congo
- Established: 2015
- Named for: Tshopo River
- Capital: Kisangani

Government
  - Governor: Paulin Lendongolia

Area
  - Total: 199,567 km^{2} (77,053 sq mi)

Population (2020 est.)
  - Total: 2,829,700
  - Density: 14.179/km^{2} (36.724/sq mi)

Ethnic groups
  - Native: Anamongo • Bambole • Balengola • Bamituku • Baturumbu • Mangbetu • Babali • Bangba • Bakumu • Bambesa • Babango • Bamanga • Mbuti,Twa • Wagenya • Bangelima • Ngombe • Waungwana • Bapoto • Batetela
  - Settler: Banyarwanda
- Time zone: UTC+2 (Central Africa Time)
- License Plate Code: (Democratic Republic of the Congo) CGO / 25
- Official language: French
- Website: latshopo.com

Tshopo is one of the 21 provinces of the Democratic Republic of the Congo created in the 2015 repartitioning. It is situated in the north central part of the country on the Tshopo River, for which it is named.

Tshopo, Bas-Uele, Haut-Uele, and Ituri provinces are the result of the dismemberment of the former Orientale province. Tshopo was formed from the Tshopo district and the independently administered city of Kisangani which retained its status as a provincial capital. The 2020 population was estimated to be 2,829,700.

== Geography ==
Tshopo is located in the north central Democratic Republic of the Congo. It borders the provinces of Tshuapa to the west; Mongala, Bas-Uele, and Haut-Uele to the north; Ituri and North Kivu to the east; and Maniema and Sankuru to the south. Most of Tshopo has a tropical rainforest climate by the Köppen-Geiger climate classification, except for parts of the north that have a tropical monsoon climate.

== Administration ==
Tshopo is divided in to seven territories and one independently administered city.

Administrative divisions	Type	Map
Kisangani	City	Kisangani
Bafwasende	Territory	Bafwasende
Banalia	Territory	Banalia
Basoko	Territory	Basoko
Isangi	Territory	Isangani
Opala	Territory	Opala
Ubundu	Territory	Ubundu
Yahuma	Territory	Yahuma

== History ==
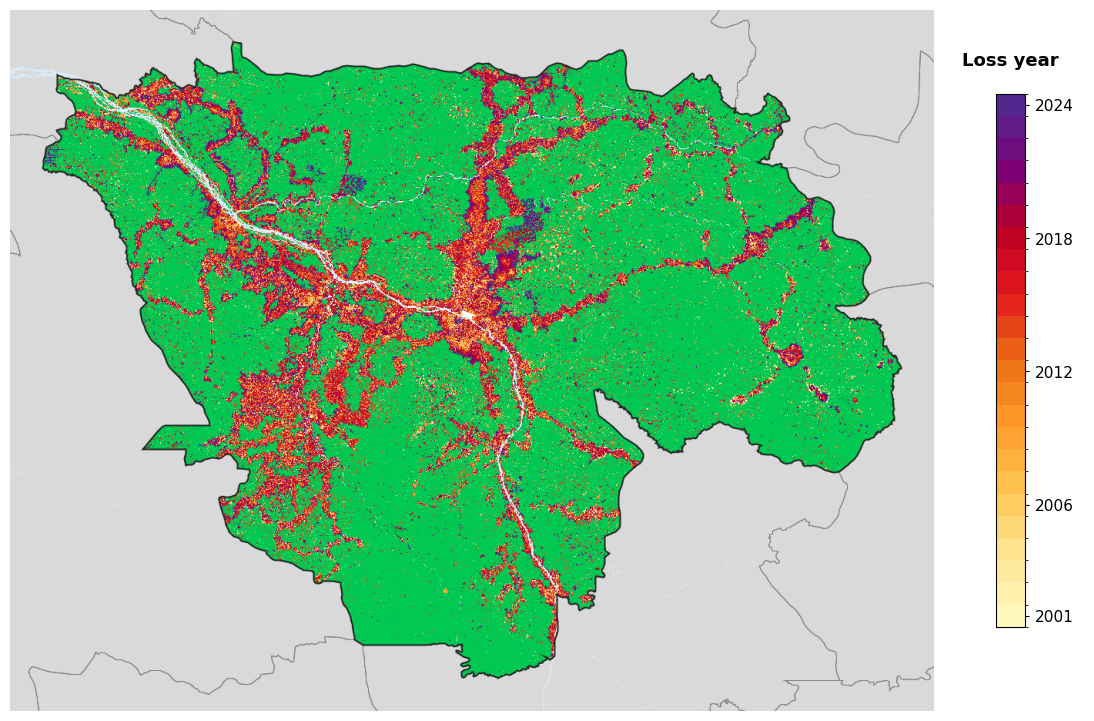
Tree-cover loss year in Tshopo, 2001-2024, from the Global Forest Change dataset.

From 1963 to 1966, the area was constituted as the province of Haut-Congo (Upper Congo). It was merged into Orientale Province in 1966 as, separately, the District of Tshopo and the city of Kisangani. The Presidents (later governors) of Haut-Congo were:

- 1963 – 26 June 1963: Georges Grenfell (b. 1908)
- 26 June 1963 – 1964: Paul Isombuma
- 1964 – August 1964: François Aradjabu
- August 1964 – 5 Nov 1966: Jean Marie Alamazani

Provincial status was re-instated to Tshopo in 2015, being formed from Tshopo District and the city of Kisangani.

=== Approximate correspondence between historical and current province ===
Approximate correspondence between historical and current province
Belgian Congo				Republic of the Congo		Zaire		Democratic Republic of the Congo	
1908	1919	1932	1947	1963	1966	1971	1988	1997	2015
22 districts	4 provinces	6 provinces	6 provinces	21 provinces + capital	8 provinces + capital	8 provinces + capital	11 provinces	11 provinces	26 provinces
Bas-Uele	Orientale	Stanleyville	Orientale	Uele	Orientale	Haut-Zaïre		Orientale	Bas-Uele
Haut-Uele	Orientale	Stanleyville	Orientale	Uele	Orientale	Haut-Zaïre		Orientale	Haut-Uele
Ituri	Orientale	Stanleyville	Orientale	Kibali-Ituri	Orientale	Haut-Zaïre		Orientale	Ituri
Stanleyville	Orientale	Stanleyville	Orientale	Haut-Congo	Orientale	Haut-Zaïre		Orientale	Tshopo
Aruwimi	Orientale	Stanleyville	Orientale	Haut-Congo	Orientale	Haut-Zaïre		Orientale	Tshopo
Maniema	Orientale	Costermansville	Kivu	Maniema	Kivu		Maniema		
Lowa	Orientale	Costermansville	Kivu	Maniema	Kivu		Maniema		
Kivu	Orientale	Costermansville	Kivu	Nord-Kivu	Kivu		Nord-Kivu		
Kivu	Orientale	Costermansville	Kivu	Kivu-Central	Kivu		Sud-Kivu		
