= List of extinct languages of Africa =

Extinct languages of Africa

Language Endangerment Status by UNESCO Atlas of the World's Languages in Danger category

Extinct (EX)
- Extinct (EX): (lists)

Endangered
- Critically Endangered (CR); Severely Endangered (SE); Definitely Endangered (DE); Vulnerable (VU): (list); (list); (list); (list)

Safe
- Safe (NE): no list
- Other categories
- Revived (RE); Constructed (CL): (list); (list)
- Related topics: Atlas of the World's Languages in Danger; Endangered Languages Project; Ethnologue; Unclassified language; List of languages by total number of speakers
- UNESCO Atlas of the World's; Languages in Danger categories

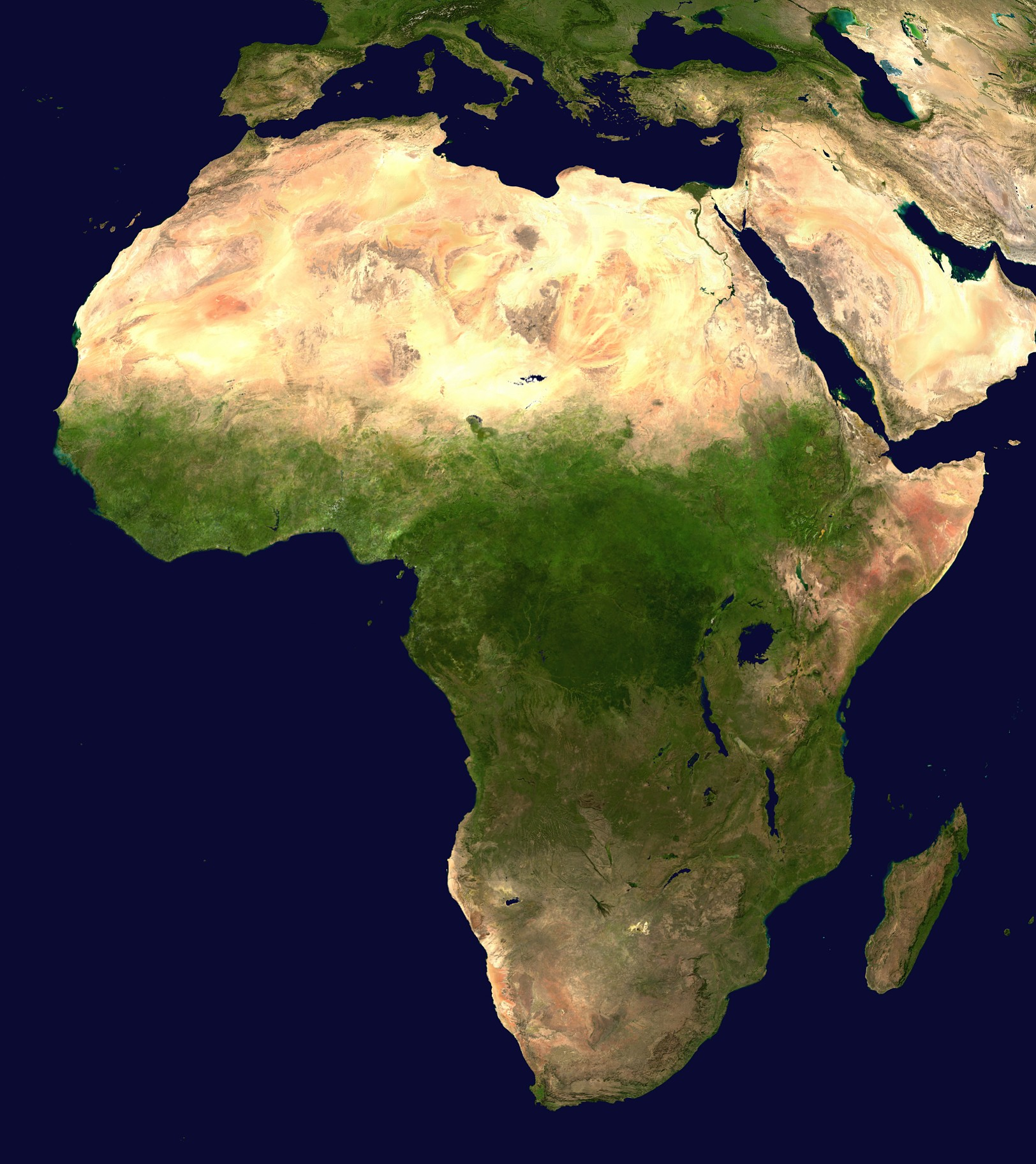

This article is a list of languages and dialects that have no native speakers, no spoken descendants, and that diverged from their parent language in Africa. There are 75 languages listed.

== List ==
| Language/dialect | Family | Date of extinction | Region | Ethnic group(s) |
|---|---|---|---|---|
| African Romance | Indo-European | 1400s AD | Roman Africa | Roman Africans |
| Ajawa | Afro-Asiatic | 1920–1940s | Bauchi State | Nigerians |
| Akpondu | Afro-Asiatic | after 2005 | Kaduna State | People from Akpondu |
| Asa | Afro-Asiatic | after 1999 | Tanzania | Asa |
| Auyokawa | Atlantic–Congo | after 1924 | Jigawa State | Nigerians |
| Basa-Gumna | Atlantic–Congo | 1987 | Chanchaga | Nigerians |
| Beigo | Eastern Sudanic? | 1960s | Darfur | Beigo speakers |
| Berakou | Central Sudanic | 1950s | Chad | Babalia people |
| Berti | Saharan | 1990s | South Darfur | Berti people |
| Bikya | Atlantic–Congo | 1987 | Cameroon | Bikya speakers |
| Birgid | Eastern Sudanic | 1970s | North Darfur | Birgid speakers |
| Bishuo | Atlantic–Congo | [data missing] | Cameroon | Bishuo speakers |
| Boro | Atlantic–Congo? | [data missing] | Ghana | Boro speakers |
| Bosha | Afro-Asiatic | [data missing] | Kingdom of Garo | Oromo people |
| Bung | Atlantic–Congo | 1970s | Adamawa | Bung speakers |
| Busuu | Niger–Congo (Probable) | late 2000s | Native to Cameroon | Busuu speakers |
| Coptic | Afro-Asiatic | 1600s^{[L]} | Egypt | Copts |
| Duli | Atlantic–Congo | 1970–1990s | northern Cameroon | Duli speakers |
| El Molo | Afro-Asiatic | 1999s | Lake Turkana | El Molo people |
| Esuma | Atlantic–Congo | 1800s | Assinie-Mafia | People of the Ivory Coast |
| Egyptian | Afro-Asiatic | 400s AD | Ancient Egypt | Egyptians |
| Gafat | Afro-Asiatic | after 1947 | Ethiopia | Gafat people |
| Gamo-Ningi | Atlantic–Congo | 1980s | Bauchi State | Nigerians |
| Gbin | Mande | 1900s | Bondoukou | Gbin speakers |
| Geʽez | Afro-Asiatic | 2000^{[L]} | Eritrea and Ethiopia | Ethiopians and Eritreans |
| Guanche | Afro-Asiatic? | 1500s | Canary Islands | Guanches |
| Gule | Koman? | after 1932 | Sudan | Gule speakers |
| Homa | Atlantic–Congo | 1975 | South Sudan | Homa speakers |
| Horo | Central Sudanic | 1940–1960s | Chad | Horo speakers |
| Italian Eritrean | Italian based Pidgin | [data missing] | Eritrea | Italians and Eritreans |
| Jalaa | Language isolate | 1992 | Nigeria | Jalabe |
| Kasabe | Atlantic–Congo | 5 November 1995 | Cameroon | Kasabe people |
| Kehek | Afro-Asiatic | 1st millennium BC | Ancient Libya | Kehek Libyans |
| Kpati | Atlantic–Congo | 1971 | Taraba State | Nigerians |
| Kubi | Afro-Asiatic | 1995 | Bauchi State | Nigerians |
| Kwadi | Khoe–Kwadi | 1981 | Angola | Kwadi speakers |
| Kwʼadza | Afro-Asiatic | 1980s | Tanzania | Kwʼadza speakers |
| Lisan al-Gharbi | Afro-Asiatic | 1300–1500s | Morocco | Berbers |
| Lower Nossob | Tuu | 2005 | South Africa and Botswana | Lower Nossob speakers |
| Lung | Niger–Congo (Probable) | early 20th century | Cameroon | Lung speakers |
| Mamluk-Kipchak | Turkic | after 1516 | Egypt | Mamluk |
| Mawa | unclassified | [data missing] | Nigeria | Nigerians |
| Meroitic | unclassified | 300s AD | Kingdom of Kush | Meroitic people |
| Mesmes | Afro-Asiatic | 2000 | Kingdom of Kush | Mesmes |
| Mittu | Central Sudanic | 1940s | South Sudan | Morokodo and Madi |
| Mozarabic | Indo-European | 1400s | North Africa | Mozarabs |
| Muskum | Chadic | 1981 | Chad | Muskum speakers |
| Nagumi | Atlantic–Congo | after 1977 | Cameroon's Northern region | Nagumi people |
| Ngasa | Afro-Asiatic? | 1950s | Tanzania | Ngasa |
| Ngbee | Atlantic–Congo | 1960s | Democratic Republic of the Congo | Mangbele |
| Nhlangwini | Niger–Congo? | [data missing] | South Africa | Nhlangwini/Ntlangwini |
| Numidian | Afro-Asiatic | 300s AD | Numidia | Numidians |
| Palmyrene Aramaic | Afro-Asiatic | after 274 AD | Palmyrene Empire | Palmyrenes |
| Punic | Afro-Asiatic | 600s AD | Carthage | Carthaginians |
| Sabaic | Afro-Asiatic | 600s AD | Horn of Africa | Sabaeans |
| Sabir | Romance-based Pidgin | 1800s | Mediterranean Basin | Medieval traders and Crusaders |
| Sened | Afro-Asiatic | 1990 | Tunisia | Speakers in Sened |
| Seroa | Tuu | 1870s | South Africa | Seroa speakers |
| Singa | Atlantic–Congo | [data missing] | Rusinga Island | Singa speakers |
| Socotra Swahili | Afro-Asiatic | by 2009 | Socotra | Soqotri people |
| Sokna | Afro-Asiatic | [data missing] | Fezzan | Sokna speakers |
| Teshenawa | Afro-Asiatic | [data missing] | Jigawa State | Nigerians |
| Togoyo | Ubangian | 1985 | South Sudan | Togoyo people |
| Tonjon | Mande | since the 1950s | Vallée du Bandama District | Djimini |
| Torona | Atlantic–Congo | January 2014 | South Kordofan | Torona people |
| Vandalic | Indo-European | 400s AD | North Africa | Vandals |
| Vazimba | Austronesian | [data missing] | Madagascar | Vazimba |
| Weyto | unclassified | [data missing] | Lake Tana | Weyto caste |
| ǀXam | Tuu | 1910s | South Africa and Lesotho | ǀXam speakers |
| ǁKā | Tuu | late 20th century | South Africa | ǁKā speakers |
| ǁXegwi | Tuu | 1988 | Lake Chrissie | ǁXegwi |
| ǃGãǃne | Tuu | after 1931 | South Africa, near Tsolo | ǃGãǃne speakers |
| ǂUngkue | Tuu | mid 20th century | South Africa, Vaal River | ǂUngkue speakers |
| Yeni | Atlantic–Congo | [data missing] | Cameroon | Yeni speakers |
| Zumaya | Afro-Asiatic | by 2006 | Cameroon | Zumaya speakers |

== See also ==
- Languages of Africa
- List of endangered languages in Africa
- Language endangerment and extinction in Africa

== Notes ==
^{L} These languages can still be spoken today, but are only used liturgically.
