= Mbo =

Mbo or MBO may refer to:

- Mbo, Nigeria, a Local Government Area
- Mbo people (Cameroon), an ethnic group of Cameroon
- Mbo people (Congo), an ethnic group of the Democratic Republic of the Congo

== Language ==
- Mbo language (Cameroon), a language spoken in Cameroon
- Mbo language (Congo), spoken by the Mbo people
- Mbo language (Zambia), a Bantu language of Zambia
- Mbo’ language, a Grassfields language of Cameroon

== People ==
- Mbo Mpenza (born 1976), retired Belgian footballer
- Emil Abossolo-Mbo (Emil Abossolo M'Bo born 1958), Cameroonian-French actor

== Places ==
- Mbo, Central African Republic, a village in Ouham-Fafa prefecture.

== Other uses ==
- Management by objectives, a performance management system popularised by Peter Drucker
- Management buyout, a form of company acquisition
- Muslim Bosniak Organization, a Bosnian political party
- Middelbaar beroepsonderwijs (middle-level applied education), a level of education in the Netherlands

== See also ==
- Nkongho language, or Upper Mbo, a Bantu language of Cameroon
- MBO Cinemas, a chain of cinemas in Malaysia
- Mbo-Ung language, a language spoken in Papua New Guinea
- Klein + M.B.O., an Italian musical group
- MBO (record label), a Thai record label
- Mbo language (disambiguation)
