= Komo–Bira languages =

Komo–Bira
- Komoic
- Ethnicity: Bira–Kumu
- Linguistic classification: Niger–Congo?: Atlantic–Congo; Benue–Congo; Southern Bantoid; Bantu (Zone D.20–30); Boan?; Komo–Bira

Language codes
- ISO 639-3: –
- Glottolog: komo1265

The Komo–Bira languages are part of the Bantu languages coded Zone D.20–30 in Guthrie's classification, specifically D.21, D.22, D.23, D.31, D.32. According to Nurse & Philippson (2003), they form a valid node; the rest of D.20 include the Lega–Holoholo languages, while the rest of the D.30 languages are not related to each other, apart from a close Budu–Ndaka group.

The Komo–Bira languages are:

- Komo (D.23)
- Bali (D.21), ?Beeke
- Biran (Bira–Amba): Amba (Kwamba), Bhele (Piri), Bila (Kango/Sua), Bera (Bira), Kaiku

In addition, Nurse & Philippson report that Bati–Angba (Bwa) languages may be included. The resulting family is called Boan. In the Boan proposal, however, Komo and Bali are the most divergent languages, and Bati–Angba is not a distinct branch, so Boan is technically a synonym for Komo–Bira.
