= Mbo people (Congo) =

Regions with significant populations
- Ituri Forest, Democratic Republic of the Congo: 17,000

Languages
- Mbo language

The Mbo people (or Imbo) are an ethnic group of the Mambasa Territory, Ituri Interim Administration in the Orientale Province on the Democratic Republic of the Congo. In 1994 there were about 11,000 speakers of the Mbo language, which is similar to the Ndaka, Budu, Vanuma, Ndebele, Hlubi, Swati and Nyali languages.
