= Ndaka =

Ndaka may be,

- Ndaka people
- Ndaka language
