= Busuu language =

Moribund Southern Bantoid language of Cameroon

Busuu
- Bùsùù
- Native to: Cameroon
- Region: North West Province, Menchum Division, Furu-Awa Subdivision, Furu-Awa and Furu-Nangwa villages.
- Extinct: late 2000s
- Language family: Niger–Congo?: Atlantic–Congo; Volta–Congo; Benue–Congo; Bantoid; Southern Bantoid; Beboid?; Furu?; Busuu

Language codes
- ISO 639-3: bju
- Glottolog: busu1244
- ELP: Busuu

Busuu (Bùsùù) is an unclassified Southern Bantoid language of Cameroon. According to Ethnologue it is extinct. Busuu is an endangered language. In 1986, only eight speakers were left of Busuu.

== See also ==
- Busuu (an online network named after the Busuu language)
