= Mungbam language =

Southern Bantoid language of Cameroon

Mungbam
- Abar
- Pronunciation: [mùŋ·gbàm]
- Native to: Cameroon
- Region: Lower Fungom
- Native speakers: 1,900–2,200 (2012)
- Language family: Niger–Congo?: Atlantic–Congo; Benue–Congo; Southern Bantoid; Western Beboid (geographic); Mungbam–Missong; Mungbam
- Dialects: Munken; Biya; Abar; Ngun

Language codes
- ISO 639-3: mij
- Glottolog: abar1238
- ELP: Mungbam

Mungbam is a Southern Bantoid language of the Lower Fungom region of Cameroon. It is traditionally classified as a Western Beboid language, but the language family is disputed. Good et al. uses a more accurate name, the 'Yemne-Kimbi group,' but proposes the term 'Beboid.'

The language is spoken in four villages, Abaar, Munken, Ngun, and Biya (formerly known as 'Za''). Speakers from each village consider their speech to be distinct, but the dialects are loosely classified as one language because they heavily overlap in grammar and vocabulary and are mutually intelligible. There is no name for the language as a whole. The village name Abar is sometimes used. The name "Mungbam" is a quasi-acronym of the village names plus Missong, which used to be considered a fifth dialect. Speakers from the four villages plus Missong regularly interact with each other in markets, at school, and during celebrations. The language is spoken by approximately 2,000 speakers across the villages, by some young people and all adults. Most Mungbam speakers now use Cameroonian pidgin to communicate with speakers of other languages. This does not seem to be contributing to the decline of Mungbam. Mungbam is classified as a threatened 6b language.

== Phonology ==
=== Consonants ===
The consonant inventory is restricted based on the consonant's placement within the morpheme and the type of morpheme. For example, the consonant inventory for affixes is very different from the consonant inventory of word stems.

Consonants of Mungbam
		Labial	Dental		(Alveolo-) Palatal	Velar	Labial- velar	Glottal
Nasal		m	n		ɲ	ŋ		
Plosive/ Affricate	voiceless	(p) (Note: /p/ has only been found in Munken, Missong, and Abar, and only in the stem pi, meaning 'die.' Good et al. suggest [p] originates from the [kp] because kpê is cognate with pi in Biya and Ngun.)	t	ts	tɕ	k	kp	
Plosive/ Affricate	voiced	b	d	dz	dʒ	g	gb	
Fricative		f	s		ɕ	x		h
Liquid			l					
Glide					ɥ j		w	

Consonants vary slightly between dialects.

=== Vowels ===
Vowel quality in Mungbam varies across dialects. The vowel inventory is not restricted by the vowel's placement within the morpheme.

Lovegren provides a vowel inventory common across all dialects.

Vowels of Mungbam
	Front	Central	Back
Close	i	ɨ	u
Close-mid	e		o
Mid	ι (Note: The symbol [ι] is used to transcribe a vowel which is very similar to [e], only more flat and slightly lower.)	ə	ʊ (Note: The symbol [ʊ] is used to transcribe a back round vowel which is at the same height or slightly lower than [o].)
Open-mid	ɛ		ɔ
Open		a	

Vowel inventories for each dialect are listed below.

Abar
	Front	Central	Back
High	i e		u o
Mid	ɪ ɛ	(ə)	ʊ
Low		a	

Ngun
	Front	Central	Back
High	i e		u o
Mid	ɪ ɛ	(ə)	ʊ ɔ
Low		a	

Munken
	Front	Central	Back
High	i		u o
Mid	e ɛ	(ə)	ɔ
Low		a	

Missong
	Front	Central	Back
High	i		u o
Mid	e ɛ	ə	o͡a ɔ
Low		a	

Biya
	Front	Central	Back
High	i e		u o
Mid	ɪ e͡a	ə	ɔ
Low		a	

=== Tone ===
Tone forms an integral part of Mungbam phonology and morphology. Tones distinguish nouns which are otherwise homophonous. With some exceptions, nouns are assigned tones and retain those tones regardless of syntax and inflection. There are four levels of tone in Mungbam.

Examples of Tone
Mungbam	Translation
bá-bja᷅ŋ	"adjumbu people"
bà-bjâŋ	"children"

=== Syllable Structure ===
Attested syllable types vary between stem-initial and non-stem-initial syllables. Word stems in Mungbam can either be monosyllabic or disyllabic. Consonants comprising the only syllable in a monosyllabic stem or the first syllable in a disyllabic stem are referred to as 'stem-initial,' all other consonants are considered 'stem-final.'

Examples of Syllables
Mungbam	Translation	Stem-Initial	Stem-Final
m̀bɔ̀ŋ	"cow"	CCVC	
m̀be᷅lə	"ribs"	CCV	CV

==== Stem-Initial ====
Attested syllable shapes for stem-initial syllables include (C)CV(C), with certain restrictions on where some consonants (such as glides and nasals) can appear within those syllables. Very few words begin with vowels in Mungbam; these are primarily restricted to lexical nouns, some pronouns, and some grammatical particles.

==== Stem-Final ====
Non-stem initial syllables are exclusively CV in shape, almost entirely predictable in terms of tone, and have a very restricted set of possible consonants.

== Morphology ==
Affixation, typically the most common morphological process, is very minimal in Mungbam. Affixation is restricted primarily to prefixes, with semi-rare circumfixes, and few suffixes. Every affix is either derivational or concordant. Derivational affixation typically either nominalizes or adjectivalizes verbs. The most common concordant affixation is that of noun-class prefixes to word stems.

=== Verbs ===
Verbs most often appear as just the stem, with no affixation at all. Each verb belongs to one of the three verb classes, which are distinct with respect to tone. Most non-tonal verb inflection is done by tense markers, which denote the five temporal tenses, as well as a conditional tense. Tense markers are all words separate from the verb except the perfect marker, which is enclitic. Mungbam morphological inflection mainly comprises tone shift, reduplication, nominalization through affixation, and some rare cases of ablaut.

==== Tone Shift ====
Tonal inflection includes tone extension and tone sandhi.

Tone extension denotes a change in verbal mood. The difference between realis and irrealis verbs corresponds, in part, to a difference between extended and unextended tones. Extension is a morphological process wherein the stem vowel of a noun is lengthened, changing the tone. Extension affects the relative height of each tone.

Examples of Tone Extension
Realis	Irrealis	Gloss
wù	wu᷅	'grind'
wû	wú	'wash.IPFV'
wû	wú	'ascend'

Consecutive verbs in the Missong dialect can experience tone sandhi.

Example of Tone Sandhi
tse᷅	'go!'
wɔ᷅ŋ	'squeeze (honey)!'
tse᷅ wɔ̋ŋ	'go and squeeze (honey)!'

==== Reduplication ====
Reduplication can either be inflectional or stylistic. Inflectional reduplication in Mungbam establishes verum focus.

Mə̄ lē dí jɛ̄ n̄-dʒ͡ú~dʒ͡ű
1SG P3 (C)say.IRR COMP 1SG-VFOC~(B)fear
'I said that I was afraid.'

Stylistic reduplication is not very well attested, Lovegren found only two examples. It might create emphasis.

==== Nominalization ====
There are two processes which nominalize verbs: a productive, well-attested process to form infinitives, and a less productive, virtually un-attested process to create the “disability construction.” Infinitives are formed by affixing a noun class prefix or, in rare cases, circumfix. Infinitives in Mungbam function as nouns do, but lack plurals. For more complicated verb phrases, the infinitive can be formed out of the entire phrase by attaching the noun-class prefix to the first verb in the phrase.

Formation of Infinitives
gbē	'fall'
ì-gbē	'falling'

There is an optional suffix that can be added for some infinitives in Biya. For example, the Biya circumfix as applied to the verb ' tɕī,' ('look'):

Biya Circumfix
tɕī	Imperative
ì-tɕī-lə	Infinitive

The “disability” construction describes humans or animals who are ‘disabled.’ Uniquely, it is the only construction where a noun may not have a noun-class prefix. It is a highly unproductive and uncommon construction.

ŋ̀-kə̀m -kûsə
CL1.NMLZ2-break leg
'amputee'

Here, the verb 'break' has been nominalized as part of the noun phrase 'broken leg' which translates more closely into 'amputee.'

==== Ablaut ====
Verbs undergo ablaut to denote changes in aspect (perfective and imperfective). The productivity of ablaut varies across the dialects of Mungbam.

Examples of Ablaut
Perfective Stem	Imperfective Stem	Gloss
ti	to	'come'
le	lɔ	'make'
ki	kju	'spit'

=== Nouns ===
With some exceptions, each noun must have a noun-class prefix, but otherwise has little to no affixation.

==== Noun Class System ====
The most common form of affixation is that of the noun-class prefix. Mungbam, like many Bantoid languages, indicates agreement with a noun-class system. In such a system, each noun has a noun-class prefix, and other morphemes take on that prefix when they agree with that noun. Unlike Indo-European systems, noun-class can be linked to number, gender, or abstraction (i.e., the plural form of a noun may belong to one class, while the singular form belongs to another class). Tone is related, but not entirely connected to, noun-class. The tone of the noun-class prefix will often, but not always, follow the tone of the stem.

Examples of Noun-Class Prefixes
Noun	Gloss	Noun-Class	Noun
ú-kpe̋	'CL3.house'	3	House
à-kə̂fə	'CL7/CL12.bone'	7 or 12	Bone
ì-bé	'CL9.goat'	9	Goat

There are some exceptions to the noun-class system, both within a dialect and among the five dialects. For example, the 7/8 noun-class pairing is found only in Missong, all nouns in those two classes are paired with other classes in the other dialects.

===== Plurality =====
Nouns in certain noun classes will have their plural forms in specific other noun classes. For example, nouns in Class 1 often have their plural forms in Class 2. Singular/plural noun-class pairings can be roughly grouped by type of noun (e.g., the class 1/2 singular/plural pairing contains mainly, but not exclusively, words referring to humans).

Some Noun-Class 1/2 Nouns
Singular	Translation	Plural	Translation
-ŋ̀kpa᷄nə	'clay dish'	bə̀-ŋkpa᷄nə	'clay dishes'
-nám	'husband'	bə́-nám	'husbands'
-m̀bɔ̀ŋ	'cow'	bə̀-m̀bɔ̀ŋ	'cows'
ù-ndi᷅nə	'woman'	bə̀-ndi᷅nə	'women'
ù-nɛ̀	'person'	bə̀-nɛ̀	'people'

==== Concord ====
Concord refers to noun-class agreement within the noun-phrase. There are three means by which Mungbam achieves concord: prefixation, tonal stem change, segmental stem change. Tonal concord causes a shift in tone when nouns are a part of an associated noun phrase. Prefixal concord is achieved by attaching the noun-class prefix of the head noun to the constituent morpheme within the noun phrase.

m̀bɔ̀ŋ ù-gbe᷅-lə
CL1.cow CL1-(A)fall-ADJ
'Fallen cow'

==== Possessive Lengthening ====
Possessive lengthening is a morphological process that occurs for nouns possessed, and found in most Mungbam dialects. It involves lengthening of the tone and, sometimes, the vowel, when the noun is next to a possessive pronoun or particle.

Possessive Lengthening Example
Word	Gloss	Translation
ú-wō	'CL3-moon'	'moon'
ú-woo᷄ mə̋	'CL3-moon POSS.1S'	'my moon'

== Syntax ==
The basic word order of Mungbam is SVO.

ù ɕòa fə̀ ŋàŋ ú-gbɛ̂
CL1 (A)loosen (A)off (A)stay.IPFV CL3-rope
'He’s loosening the rope.'

Mungbam must have a subject directly preceding the verb. When the lexical subject follows the verb, a particle known as a 'dummy subject' is placed before the verb.

à kə̀fə tɕà te̋ nâ wù
DS (A)shout (A)pass (B)come mother CL1.DET
'It was the woman who shouted the most.'

Here, 'à' is glossed as the 'dummy subject,' and functions as a placeholder with no other meaning.

The ordering of constituents within the Mungbam noun phrase is as follows: Noun, associated noun phrase, possession and other modifier, adjective, number, demonstrative, relative clause, determiner. While there are recorded exceptions for much of this ordering, associated noun phrases must come strictly after the head noun.

múm-bûs mɔ̋ mūŋ-gbábə-tɕí mūm-fín mūn-dɮɛ̂n mū
CL18a-cat 1SG.POSS CL18a-(B)strong-ADJ CL18a-two CL18a-DEM.DIST CL18a.DET
'Those my two strong cats.'

=== Negation ===
Sentences are typically negated by the addition of a particle towards the end of the sentence. While this addition may change the word order in transitive sentences, intransitive sentences always keep the SV word order.

mə̄ mâki á kə̀m fànə dà
1SG LOC.market NEG (A)again (A)sell D.NEG
'I don't sell in the market anymore.'
