= 2001 Bunia clashes and massacre =

Interrelated attacks and retaliatory massacre in Bunia

- Part of Ituri conflict
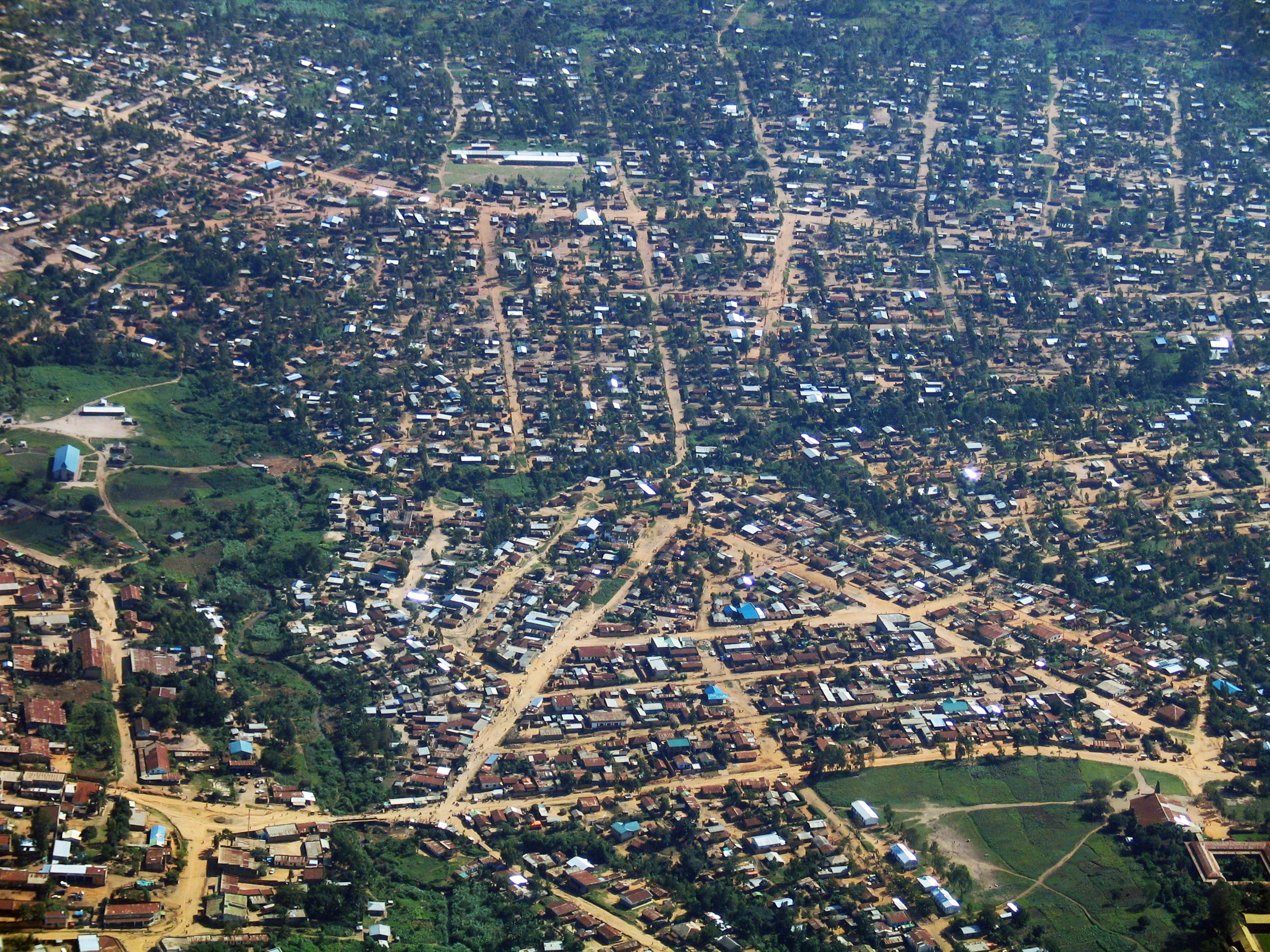
- Bunia, site of the 19 January 2001 violence
- Location: Bunia, Ituri Province, Democratic Republic of the Congo
- Date: 19 January 2001; 25 years ago
- Target: Hema civilians (morning attack); Lendu (retaliatory massacre)
- Attack type: Ethnic attack and retaliatory massacre
- Weapons: Machetes, spears, bows and arrows, arson
- Deaths: 50 Hema civilians (killed during the morning Lendu-Ngiti attack); 60 Lendu-Ngiti attackers (killed while being repelled by UPDF forces); 100–150+ Lendu civilians killed (killed in the retaliatory massacre)
- Injuries: 20
- Perpetrators: Lendu-Ngiti fighters (morning attack); armed Hema civilian groups (retaliatory massacre)
- Motive: Ethnic hostility and retaliation related to the Hema–Lendu conflict

The 2001 Bunia clashes and massacre (French: Affrontements et massacre de Bunia en 2001) was a sequence of interrelated attacks carried out on 19 January 2001 in and around Bunia, the capital of Ituri Province in northeastern Democratic Republic of the Congo, during a major intensification of Hema–Lendu conflict while the city was under the military control of the Ugandan People's Defence Force (UPDF). The violence began with a dawn attack by Lendu-Ngiti fighters near Bunia Airport, aimed in part at destroying a Ugandan helicopter used in earlier operations. The attack resulted in the massacre of about 50 Hema civilians and the wounding of at least 20 more, before UPDF troops pushed back the attackers and killed an estimated 60 Lendu-Ngiti fighters.

That afternoon, armed Hema civilian groups carried out a retaliatory massacre against Lendu civilians across the city. Amnesty International recorded at least 150 Lendu fatalities, while Human Rights Watch cited "more than 100" deaths. Humanitarian organizations hesitated to intervene due to threats and allegations from Hema extremists accusing aid workers of siding with their adversaries. Despite holding effective control over Bunia, Ugandan forces were widely condemned for failing to stop the violence; UPDF commander Colonel Edison Muzoora ignored repeated pleas from residents. Order was ultimately restored only after civilians unaffiliated with either group intervened to halt the killing, at which UPDF patrols belatedly moved through the city.

== Background ==
Bunia is the capital of the Ituri Province, which is located in northeastern Democratic Republic of the Congo and borders Uganda. The province is administratively divided into five territories: Aru, Djugu, Irumu, Mahagi, and Mambasa, and is home to several ethnic groups, including the Lendu (with a southern Lendu sub-clan, the Ngiti), Hema (with a northern Hema sub-clan, the Gegere), Bira, Alur, Ndo Okedo, Mambissa, Nyali, and Nande. The Hema/Gegere and Lendu are primarily located in Djugu Territory, while Hema and Ngiti are in Irumu Territory.

Tensions between the predominantly pastoralist Hema and the largely agricultural Lendu date back decades and periodically erupt into violence. Under Belgian rule, administrative favoritism toward the Hema deepened inequalities by granting them greater access to land, education, state positions, and economic advantages. Although these imbalances continued after independence, daily coexistence between Hema and Lendu in rural areas was often peaceful, and intermarriage was widespread. Land disputes in May–June 1999 between Hema landowners and Lendu smallholders ignited intercommunal conflict that, according to Amnesty International, had claimed tens of thousands of civilian lives. Regional political and military elites exploited and intensified the hostilities for strategic and economic gain. The early phase of the conflict, concentrated in Djugu Territory between mid-1999 and early 2000, saw Hema militias, frequently supported by the Uganda People's Defence Force (UPDF), which supplied them with firearms and gained a military advantage. Lendu were pushed from traditional areas, especially along routes leading toward the Ugandan border. By early 2000, the violence had resulted in an estimated 7,000 civilian deaths and more than 180,000 displaced persons. Multiple credible reports indicated that Ugandan troops and their local allies frequently sided with Hema groups and were implicated in abuses against Lendu civilians, though Lendu factions also benefited from alliances with other ethnic and armed political groups.

Both Hema and Lendu groups became increasingly radicalized as leaders promoted ethnic hatred and mobilized militias. The conflict was marked by extreme brutality, including mass killings with armes blanches, machetes, axes, spears, and bows and arrows, widespread village burnings, and large-scale displacement. Efforts at mediation initially showed promise but were disrupted by political turmoil within the Ugandan-backed RCD-ML armed movement and by the controversial detention and transfer to Uganda of Ituri's governor, Ernest Uringi Padolo, whom many credited with advancing reconciliation. With Ugandan authorities offering no explanation for his detention, fragile reconciliation efforts were severely weakened. As the conflict widened, new territories and other ethnic groups, especially the Bira and Alur, were drawn into the conflict. Civilians originating from outside Ituri, especially the Nande business community in Bunia, were also targeted by Hema militias due to their perceived association with the RCD-ML, led by Antipas Mbusa Nyamwisi, himself a Nande and increasingly aligned with the Lendu. The UPDF remained heavily engaged in the conflict and committed numerous human rights abuses. While widely perceived as supporting Hema interests, UPDF units were reported to have carried out attacks on Lendu and other groups, sold arms to local armed factions, and trained militias, including children, primarily among the Hema. Some UPDF commanders allegedly accepted payments from Hema businessmen in exchange for military protection; in at least one instance, UPDF units reportedly clashed with one another after defending opposing communities.

== Morning attack and retaliatory massacre ==
On the morning of 19 January 2001, Lendu and Ngiti fighters armed with spears and bows launched a dawn attack near Bunia Airport. The attack extended into Bunia itself, following three weeks of violence in villages south of the city. One apparent objective was the destruction of a Ugandan helicopter previously used against Lendu forces. During this initial assault, as many as 50 Hema civilians were reportedly massacred, stabbed with spears or arrows or burned alive in their homes, and around 20 others were injured. Ugandan forces responded with heavy weapons and repelled the attack, with reports indicating that at least 60 Lendu and Ngiti combatants were killed.

Later that same day, armed Hema civilian groups carried out a retaliatory massacre against Lendu civilians across the city. According to Amnesty International, at least 150 Lendu civilians were massacred; Human Rights Watch estimated that "more than 100" were massacred. Victims, including women and children, were hacked to death with machetes, and some were decapitated. Bodies were reportedly discarded in open pit latrines, and numerous homes were looted and burned. Humanitarian organizations were initially reluctant to intervene due to threats and accusations by Hema extremists who claimed aid groups were supporting their adversaries. Despite their presence in Bunia, Ugandan troops did nothing to stop the killings, and their commander, Colonel Edison Muzoora, disregarded residents' pleas for intervention. Civilians unaffiliated with either ethnic group eventually stepped in to quell the violence. Ugandan forces only began patrolling the city and restoring order after the killings had mostly stopped.
