= Ajuh-Mbuh =

Village in Northwest Region, Cameroon

- Village
- Interactive map of Ajuh-Mbuh
- Coordinates: 6°32′27″N 10°14′17″E
- Commune: Fungom (Zhoa)
- Elevation: 943 m (3,094 ft)

Population (2005)
  - Total: 223

Ajuh-Mbuh (alternatively spelled Aju Mbu) is a 3rd-degree traditional village located within the Zhoa commune of the Menchum department, in the Northwest Region of Cameroon.

== Geography ==
Ajuh-Mbuh is located at coordinates 6°32′27″N 10°14′17″E at an elevation of 943 metres (3,094 ft) above sea level. It sits approximately 68 kilometres (42 mi) north of Bamenda, the regional capital, and about 329 kilometres (204 mi) northwest of Yaoundé, the national capital of Cameroon.

== Population ==
According to the 2005 national census, Ajuh-Mbuh had a population of 223 inhabitants. However, local community diagnostic mapping figures recorded during the formulation of the municipal investment plan estimate the broader neighborhood population at 561 inhabitants.

== Education ==
The village has a public primary school, GS Aju Mbu (Government School Aju Mbu), which was established in 1998.

According to municipal diagnostic data, the school has an enrollment of 112 students (consisting of 44 girls and 68 boys) staffed by three teachers, giving a student-to-teacher ratio of approximately 37:1. The school operates with three standard classrooms and an administrative workspace.

== Language and culture ==
The village is the primary location where the Ajumbu language (also known as Ajuh Mbuh or Mbu') is spoken.It is a critically endangered Southern Bantoid language with very few native speakers left in the region.
