= Bukwen language =

Bantoid language spoken in Nigeria

Bukwen
- Native to: Nigeria
- Region: Taraba State
- Native speakers: (undated figure of 1,000)
- Language family: Niger–Congo?: Atlantic–Congo; Benue–Congo; Southern Bantoid; Western Beboid (geographic); Mundabli–Buu; Bukwen

Language codes
- ISO 639-3: buz
- Glottolog: bukw1238

Bukwen is a Southern Bantoid language of Cameroon. It is spoken in a single village south of Takum, just across the Cameeroonian border from Furu Awa. The only data on Bukwen is found in a 1971 survey report by Robert Koops, who collected the data from Mairogo, southeastern Nigeria (Mashi is also spoken in Mairogo). Based on this limited data, it appears to be a Western Beboid language of the Mundabli–Buu group.

Bukwen is most closely related to Koshin.
