= Mbo language =

Mbo may refer to:

- Mbo language (Cameroon), a language spoken in Cameroon
- Mbo language (Congo), spoken by the Mbo people
- Mbo language (Zambia), a Bantu language of Zambia
- Mbo’ language, a Grassfields language of Cameroon
- Mbo language (Sino-Tibetan), an unclassified Sino-Tibetan language of Tibet

== See also ==
- Mbo (disambiguation)
