= KBJ =

KBJ may refer to:

- Ketanji Brown Jackson, associate justice of the US Supreme Court
- KBJ Architects
- Kantabanji, Balangir district, Odisha, India
- kbj, the ISO 639 code for the Kari language
