= Cung =

Cung may refer to:

- Cung Le
- Cung language
