= Bishuo language =

Possibly extinct Southern Bantoid language of Cameroon

Bishuo
- Native to: Cameroon
- Ethnicity: Biyam, Furu-Turuwa, Furu-Sambari
- Extinct: by 2002, with the death of Irissa Ntjieka
- Language family: Niger–Congo?: Atlantic–Congo; Volta–Congo; Benue–Congo; Bantoid; Southern Bantoid; Beboid?; Furu?; Bishuo

Language codes
- ISO 639-3: bwh
- Glottolog: bish1246
- ELP: Bishuo

Bishuo (Bishùo) is an extinct southern Bantoid language of Cameroon.

The Bishuo language was originally spoken by three of the constituent groups of the Furu people, an ethnic group now speaking Jukunoid languages. As of 1986, only one man, Irissa Ntjieka, spoke Bishuo, although his son, Peter Alom, had been raised speaking it.

== Classification ==
Bishuo only shares 11% of its vocabulary with neighbouring Bikya. However, it has 17% of its vocabulary in common with Noni.
