= Kaiku language =

Bantu language of the Democratic Republic of the Congo

Kaiku
- Ikaiku
- Native to: DR Congo
- Native speakers: 13,000 (2002)
- Language family: Niger–Congo?: Atlantic–Congo; Benue–Congo; Bantoid; Bantu (Zone D.20–30); Boan; Bomokandian; Biran; Kaiku

Language codes
- ISO 639-3: kkq
- Glottolog: kaik1247
- Guthrie code: D.312

Kaiku is a Bantu language of the Democratic Republic of the Congo.
