= Amba language (Bantu) =

Bantu language of Uganda and the DRC

Amba
- Kwamba
- Native to: Uganda, DR Congo
- Native speakers: 40,000 (2002)
- Language family: Niger–Congo?: Atlantic–Congo; Volta-Congo; Benue–Congo; Bantoid; Southern Bantoid; Bantu (Zone D.20–30); Boan; Bomokandian; Biran; Amba

Language codes
- ISO 639-3: rwm
- Glottolog: amba1263
- Guthrie code: D.22

Vamba
- Native to: DR Congo
- Region: Ruwenzories–Kivu
- Extinct: (date missing)
- Language family: Amba-based pidgin

Language codes
- ISO 639-3: None (mis)
- Glottolog: None
- Guthrie code: D.20B

Amba (also spelled Bulebule, Hamba, Humu, Kihumu, Ku-Amba, Kuamba, Lubulebule, Lwamba, Ruwenzori Kibira, and Rwamba) is a language spoken in parts of Uganda and the Democratic Republic of Congo by the Amba people. The Amba people call it Kwamba and it is known as Kihumu in the Democratic Republic of the Congo. Amba has a 70% lexical similarity with Bera. Dialects include Kyanzi (Kihyanzi) and Suwa (Kusuwa).

There was once an Amba pidgin called Vamba, now extinct.
