= Bira language =

Bantu language of the northeastern DR Congo

Bera
- Kibira
- Native to: DR Congo
- Native speakers: (120,000 cited 1992)
- Language family: Niger–Congo?: Atlantic–Congo; Benue–Congo; Bantoid; Bantu (Zone D.20–30); Boan; Bomokandian; Biran; Bera

Language codes
- ISO 639-3: brf
- Glottolog: bera1259
- Guthrie code: D.32

Bera (Bira) is a Bantu language of the Democratic Republic of the Congo. It is close to Amba.
