= Furu =

Furu may refer to:

- Fermented bean curd
- Furu language (Central Sudanic family)
- Furu languages (Southern Bantoid family)
- Furu, a 2014 album by Belgian band Arsenal
