= Mbo people =

Mbo people may refer to:

- Mbo people (Congo)
- Mbo people (Cameroon)
