= Bodo language (Bantu) =

Moribund Bantu language of Central Africa

Bodo
- Native to: Central African Republic
- Native speakers: (15 cited 1996)
- Language family: Niger–Congo?: Atlantic–Congo; Benue–Congo; Bantoid; Bantu (Zone D); Lebonya ? Ngendan?; Bodo

Language codes
- ISO 639-3: boy
- Glottolog: bodo1272
- Guthrie code: D.308
- ELP: Bodo

Bodo is a possibly extinct Bantu language of the Central African Republic. It may be part of a group of languages called "Lebonya".

UNESCO lists Bodo as "severely endangered". It reportedly has or had 15 speakers, who lived scattered throughout the country.
