= Buu language (Cameroon) =

Southern Bantoid language of Cameroon

Buu
- Nubabo
- Native to: Cameroon
- Native speakers: 100–200 (2012)
- Language family: Niger–Congo?: Atlantic–Congo; Benue–Congo; Southern Bantoid; Western Beboid (geographic); Mundabli–Buu; Buu

Language codes
- ISO 639-3: lfb
- Glottolog: buuu1246
- ELP: Buu (Cameroon)

Buu (also spelled Bu) is a Southern Bantoid language of Cameroon. It is closely related to Mundabli.

"Buu" is a village name.
