= Lengola language =

Bantu language of DR Congo

Lengola
- Kilengola
- Native to: DR Congo
- Native speakers: (100,000 cited 1998)
- Language family: Niger–Congo?: Atlantic–Congo; Benue–Congo; Bantoid; Bantu (Zone D); Lebonya ?; Lengola

Language codes
- ISO 639-3: lej
- Glottolog: leng1258
- Guthrie code: D.12

Lengola (Lengora) is a Bantu language of the Democratic Republic of the Congo. It is not close to other Bantu languages. It may be closest to some of the D.30 languages in a group called "Lebonya".

== Phonology ==
Lengola consonants
	Bilabial	Labiodental	Alveolar	Postalveolar	Palatal	Velar	Labiovelar
Nasal	m		n		ɲ		
Plosive	p · b		t · d			k · ɡ	kp · ɡb
Implosive	ɓ		ɗ		ʄ		
Affricate				tʃ · dʒ			
Fricative	ɸ · β	f · v	s				
Approximant					j		w
Lateral approximant			l				

Lengola vowels
	Front	Back
Close	i	u
Close-mid	e	o
Open	a	

There are also three tones: High, mid, and low.
