= Abaar =

Village in Northwest Region, Cameroon

Abaar Abar
- Village
- Interactive map of Abaar
- Coordinates: 6°34′39″N 10°14′21″E
- Country: Cameroon
- Region: Northwest Region
- Department: Menchum
- Commune: Zhoa

Population (2005)
  - Total: 792

Abaar (also spelled Abar) is a village in the Fungom subdivision of the Zhoa commune, Menchum Department, Northwest Region, Cameroon, near the border with Nigeria.

== Geography ==
Abaar is located in the Lower Fungom area of northwestern Cameroon. By foot, it lies approximately 30 minutes from Missong, 90 minutes from Mashi, Mufu and Mbu', and about two hours from Mundabli and Koshin.

== Population ==
Abaar had a population of 438 inhabitants in 1970 and 606 inhabitants in 1987.

According to the 2005 national census, the village had a population of 792 inhabitants, including 354 men and 438 women.

== Language ==
The principal language spoken in the village is Abar, one of the varieties grouped under the Mungbam language of the Lower Fungom region. Mungbam is classified as a Southern Bantoid language and is considered endangered.
