= Bikya language =

Bantoid language spoken in Cameroon

Bikya
- Furu
- Native to: Cameroon
- Region: Northwest Region, Menchum department, Furu-Awa Subdivision, Furubana village
- Extinct: by 2002, with the death of Dana Agayando
- Language family: Niger–Congo?: Atlantic–Congo; Volta–Congo; Benue–Congo; Bantoid; Southern Bantoid; Beboid; Furu or Eastern Beboid; Bikya

Language codes
- ISO 639-3: byb
- Glottolog: biky1238
- ELP: Bikya

Bikya (also known as Furu) is a potentially extinct Southern Bantoid language spoken in Cameroon. It is one of the three, or four, Furu languages. In 1986 four surviving speakers were identified, although only one (a man in his seventies) spoke the language fluently.

Dana Agayando, born around 1910, was said to be the last speaker of Bikya in 1995.

English linguist Dr. David Dalby filmed an 87-year-old African woman who spoke Bikya as her native tongue. At the time, it was believed that she was the last Bikya speaker.

It, and presumably all of Furu, is perhaps a Beboid language.

== Bibliography ==
- Breton, Roland (1995) 'Les Furu et leur voisins', Cahier Sciences Humaines, 31, 1, 17–48.
- Breton, Roland (1993) "Is there a Furu Language Group? An investigation on the Cameroon-Nigeria Border", The Journal of West African Languages, 23, 2, 97–98.
- Blench, Roger (2011) 'The membership and internal structure of Bantoid and the border with Bantu'. Bantu IV, Humboldt University, Berlin.
