= Fio language =

Eastern Beboid language of Cameroon

Fio
- Region: Cameroon
- Language family: Niger–Congo?: Atlantic–Congo; Volta–Congo; Benue–Congo; Bantoid; Southern Bantoid; Beboid?; Eastern Beboid; (unclassified); Fio

Language codes
- ISO 639-3: None (mis)
- Glottolog: fioo1234

Fio is an Eastern Beboid language of Cameroon.

== See also ==
- List of endangered languages in Africa
