= Roland Kiessling =

German linguist (born 1962)

- Born: Roland Kießling; 25 July 1962 (age 64); Hamburg, West Germany
- Occupation: Linguist

Academic background
- Education: University of Hamburg

Academic work
- Institutions: University of Hamburg
- Main interests: Languages of Africa

Roland Kiessling (German: Roland Kießling; born 25 July 1962 in Hamburg, West Germany) is a German linguist and Africanist. Kiessling's research interests include language documentation, phonetics, historical linguistics, Cushitic languages (particularly the South Cushitic languages), Nilotic languages (particularly the Southern Nilotic languages), Niger-Congo languages (particularly the Southern Bantoid languages), and !Xoon.

== Biography ==
Kiessling studied African Studies and Phonetics at the University of Hamburg, where he obtained a PhD in 1993 and Habilitation in 2000. From 1990 to 1993, he was a research associate in a DFG project led by Ludwig Gerhardt, where he worked on Iraqw texts. Afterwards, he was a research assistant from 1993 to 1999 at the Institute for African Studies and Ethiopian Studies at the University of Hamburg.

Kiessling received the Kurt Hartwig Siemers Prize from the Hamburg Scientific Foundation in 1995. From 2001 to 2006, he was a DFG Heisenberg fellow.

Since 1 October 2006 he has been Professor of African studies at the University of Hamburg.

== Selected publications ==
- Eine Grammatik des Burunge (= Afrikanistische Forschungen. Band 13). Research-and-Progress-Verlag, Hamburg 1994, ISBN 3-929491-03-6 (zugleich Dissertation, Hamburg 1994).
- editor, with Paul Berger: Iraqw texts (= Archiv afrikanistischer Manuskripte. Band 4). Köppe, Köln 1998, ISBN 3-927620-34-3.
- with Maarten Mous and Martha Qorro: Iraqw-English dictionary. With an English and a thesaurus index texts (= Kuschitische Sprachstudien. Band 18). Köppe, Köln 2002, ISBN 3-89645-065-4.
- editor, with Theda Schumann, Mechthild Reh and Ludwig Gerhardt: Aktuelle Forschungen zu afrikanischen Sprachen. Sprachwissenschaftliche Beiträge zum 14. Afrikanistentag, Hamburg, 11. – 14. Oktober 2000. Köppe, Köln 2002, ISBN 3-89645-401-3.
- Die Rekonstruktion der südkuschitischen Sprachen (West-Rift). Von den systemlinguistischen Manifestationen zum gesellschaftlichen Rahmen des Sprachwandels (= Kuschitische Sprachstudien. Band 19). Köppe, Köln 2002, ISBN 3-89645-066-2 (zugleich Habilitationsschrift, Hamburg 2001).
- with Maarten Mous: The lexical reconstruction of West-Rift Southern Cushitic (= Kuschitische Sprachstudien. Band 21). Köppe, Köln 2003, ISBN 3-89645-068-9.
- Verbal serialisation in Isu (West-Ring). A Grassfields language of Cameroon (= Kuschitische Sprachstudien. Band 39). Köppe, Köln 2011, ISBN 978-3-89645-555-0.
