= Zhoa =

Coordinates: 6.3333°N 10.0667°E

- Commune and town
- Interactive map of Zhoa
- Country: Cameroon
- Region: North-West Region
- Department: Menchum
- Time zone: UTC+1 (WAT)

Zhoa is a town and commune in Cameroon.

Zhoa is one of the Communes in the North Western Region of Cameroon. Main Towns in the menchum division include Weh (We in French), Esu, and Zhoa. Zhao is the administrative capital of the Zhoa Commune. Zhoa is found in the Menchum Division and the headquarters of the Fungom Subdivision. The Zhoa people speak the Zhoa language.
