= Mbuk language =

Beboid language spoken mainly in Cameroon

Mbuk
- Mboko
- Region: Cameroon
- Native speakers: 600 (2020)
- Language family: Niger–Congo?: Atlantic–Congo; Benue–Congo; Southern Bantoid; Eastern Beboid; Mbuk

Language codes
- ISO 639-3: bpc (Note: Earlier grouped with Chung language in cug)
- Glottolog: mbuk1244

Mbuk is an Eastern Beboid language of Cameroon.
