= Lebonya languages =

Proposed group of Bantu languages

Lebonya
- Geographic distribution: Democratic Republic of the Congo
- Linguistic classification: Niger–Congo?: Atlantic–Congo; Benue–Congo; Southern Bantoid; Bantu (Zone D); Lebonya
- Subdivisions: Lengola; Bodo; Nyali

Language codes
- Glottolog: lebo1246

Lebonya is a proposed intermediate group of Bantu languages coded Zone D in Guthrie's classification. It is also known as Lebonya-Boan.

There are three branches:

- Lengola
- Bodo
- the Nyali languages

Glottolog 2.3 classifies Bodo instead as one of the Ngendan languages.
