= Koshin language =

Language

Koshin
- Native to: Cameroon
- Native speakers: 3,000 (2011)
- Language family: Niger–Congo?: Atlantic–Congo; Benue–Congo; Southern Bantoid; Western Beboid (geographic); Koshin

Language codes
- ISO 639-3: kid
- Glottolog: kosh1246
- ELP: Koshin

Koshin is a Southern Bantoid language of Cameroon. It is traditionally classified as a Western Beboid language, but that has not been demonstrated to be a valid family.

"Koshin" is the name of the village the language is spoken in.

Koshin is most closely related to Bukwen.

== Phonology ==
Koshin Consonant Phonemes
| | | Labial | Dental | Palatal | Velar |
|---|---|---|---|---|---|
| Nasal | | m | n̪ | ɲ | ŋ |
| Plosive | voiceless | | t̪ | | k |
| Plosive | voiced | b | d̪ | | g |
| Affricate | voiceless | | t̪s̪ | tʃ | kp |
| Affricate | voiced | | d̪z̪ | dʒ | gb |
| Fricative | voiceless | f | s̪ | ʃ | |
| Fricative | voiced | | z̪ | ʒ | |
| Approximant | | | l̪ | j | w |

Koshin Vowel Phonemes
| | Front | | Central | Back | |
| | Less rounded | Plain | Central | Less rounded | Plain |
|---|---|---|---|---|---|
| Close | i̜ | i | ɨ̜ | u̜ | u |
| Close-mid | e | | ə | | |
| Open-mid | ɛ | | ə | ɔ | |
| Open | æ | | a | | |

There are three tones; high, mid, and low.
