= Ngbinda language =

Language

Ngbinda
- Native to: Democratic Republic of the Congo
- Native speakers: 25,000 (2002–2004)
- Language family: Niger–Congo?: Atlantic–Congo; Benue–Congo; Bantoid; Bantu; Boan; Bomokandian; Ngendan; Ngbinda

Language codes
- ISO 639-3: Either: nbd – Ngbinda myc – Mayeka
- Glottolog: ngbi1238
- Guthrie code: D.303,307
- ELP: Ngbinda

Ngbinda is a poorly documented Congolese Bantu language of uncertain affiliation (though listed as unclassified Zone D.30 by Guthrie). Prior to 1975 it had also been spoken in southern Sudan.

The Mayeka are a Ngbinda clan, but due to lack of evidence, it is not possible to determine whether Mayeka and Ngbinda should be considered the same language. An ISO proposal to merge the two languages into a single code was rejected due to the lack of linguistic evidence.
