= Mundabli-Mufu language =

Bantoid language spoken in Cameroon

Mundabli-Mufu
- Ji
- Native to: Cameroon
- Native speakers: 500 (2011)
- Language family: Niger–Congo?: Atlantic–Congo; Benue–Congo; Southern Bantoid; Western Beboid (geographic); Mundabli–Buu; Mundabli-Mufu
- Dialects: Mundabli (Ngo Njan); Mufu (Ngo Nsoh)

Language codes
- ISO 639-3: boe
- Glottolog: mund1328
- ELP: Mundabli-Mufu

Mundabli-Mufu is a Southern Bantoid language of Cameroon. It is traditionally classified as a Western Beboid language, but that has not been demonstrated to be a valid family.

The language is spoken in the villages of Mundabli (6.6063122°N 10.2729361°E) and Mufu. The neighboring village of Buu speaks a closely related but distinct language.

== Phonology ==
Mundabli Consonant Phonemes
		Labial	Dental	Palatal		Velar
		Labial	Dental	Plain	Labial	Velar
Nasal		m	n̪	ɲ		ŋ
Plosive	voiceless		t̪			k
Plosive	voiced	b	d̪			g
Affricate	voiceless		t̪s̪	tʃ		kp
Affricate	voiced		d̪z̪	dʒ		gb
Fricative		f	s̪	ʃ		
Approximant			l̪	j	ɥ	w

Mundabli Vowel Phonemes
	Front		Central	Back	
	Plain	Lowered	Central	Lowered	Plain
Close	i	ɪ	ɨ	ʊ	u
Close-mid	e		ə	o	
Open-mid	ɛ		ə	ɔ	
Open	a			ɒ	

There are four tones; extra high, high, mid, and low.
