= Wum =

Commune and town in Northwest Province, Cameroon

- Commune and town
- Location in Cameroon
- Coordinates: 6°23′N 10°04′E
- Country: Cameroon
- Province: Northwest Province
- Elevation: 1,109 m (3,638 ft)

Population (2012)
  - Total: 26,123
- Time zone: UTC+1 (WAT)

Wum is a town and commune in Cameroon. It is the capital of Menchum division in the Northwest Province.

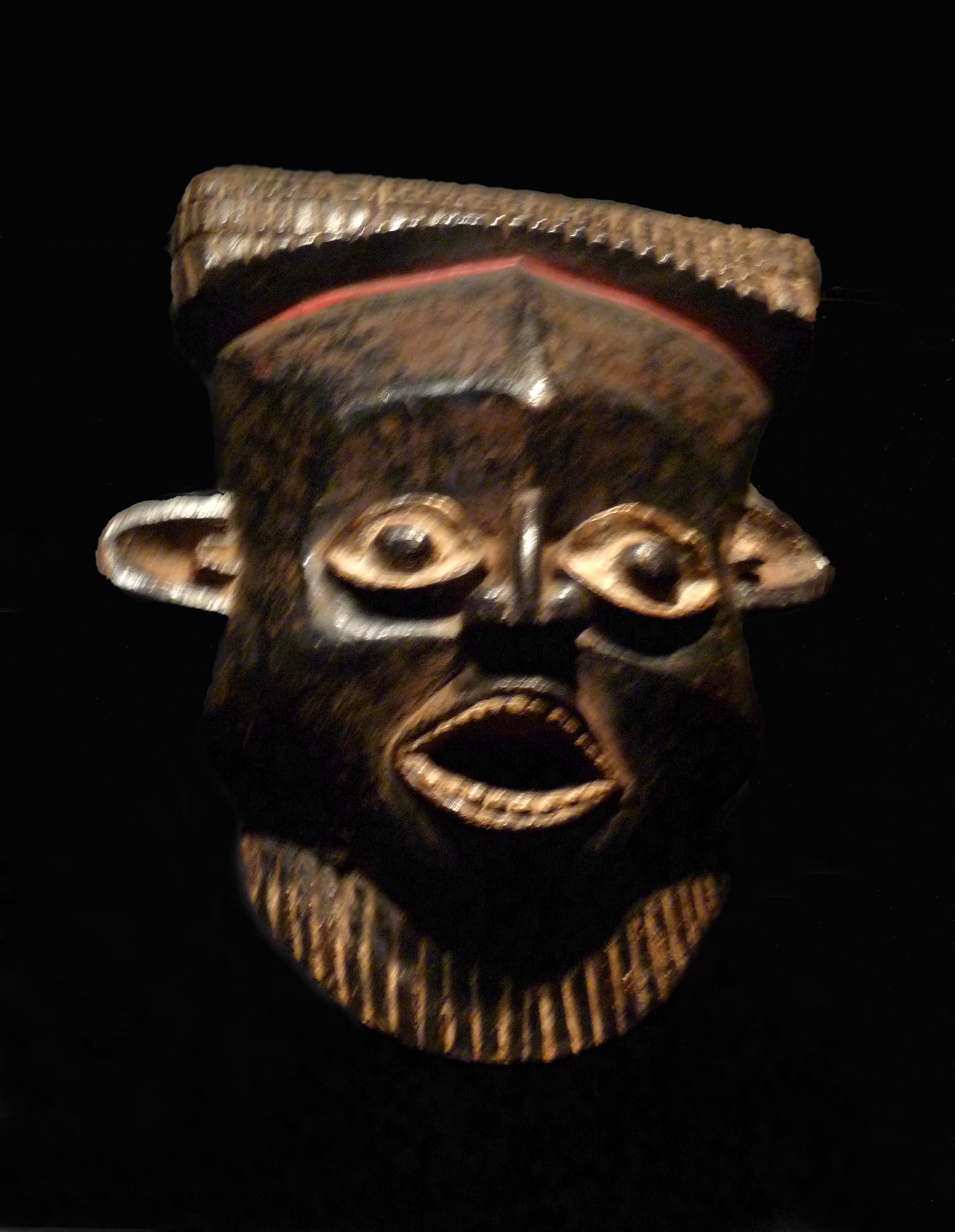
Masque de danse Wum-Musée du quai Branly

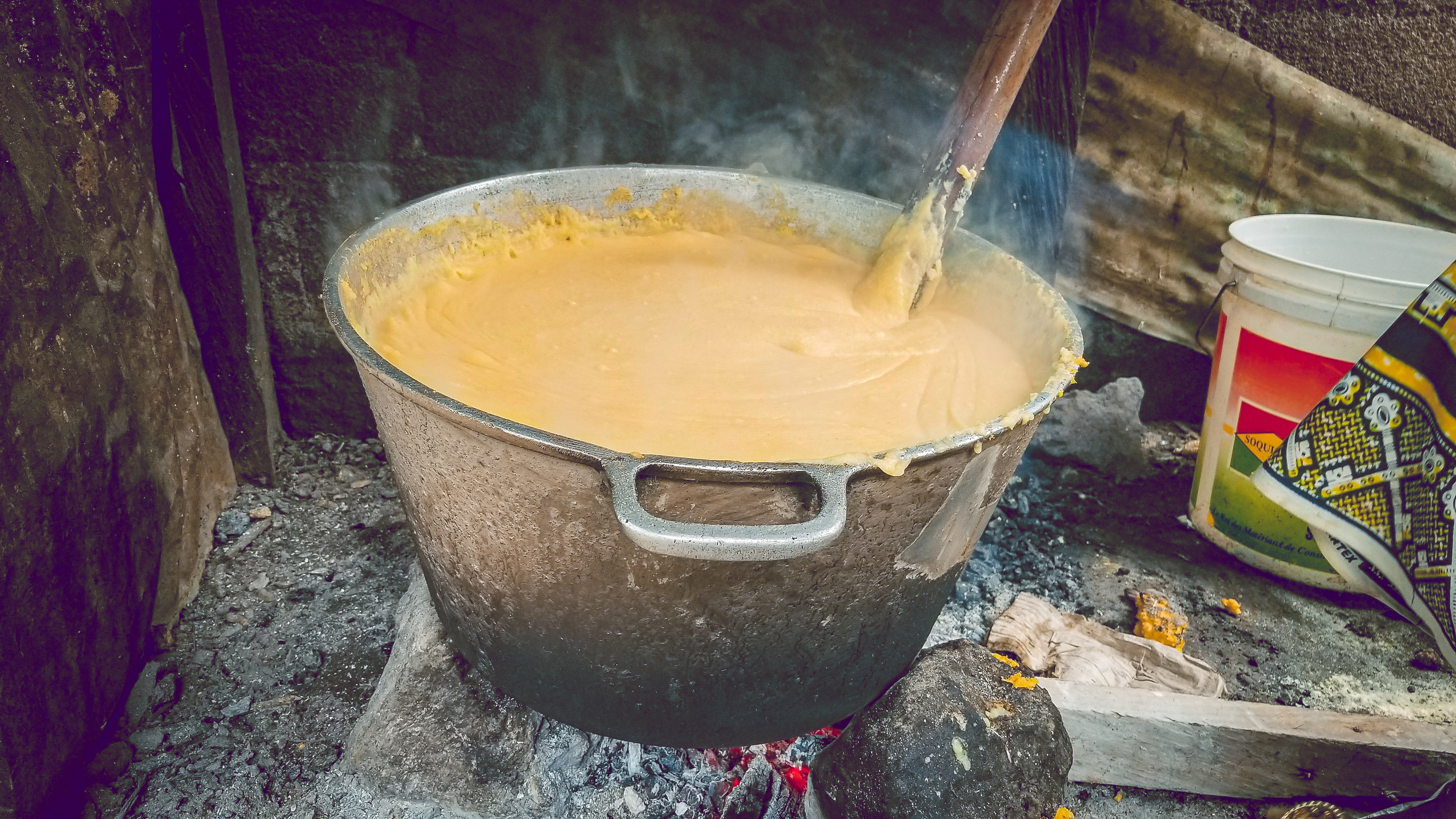
Fufu Corn

== Geography ==
Wum is the third biggest town in the north west region of Cameroon. It lies on a plateau at an elevation of about 1100 m near the edge of the western highlands of Cameroon. It is 80 kilometres (50 mi) north of the regional capital Bamenda (by dirt road). It lies near Lake Wum, one of five small crater lakes within 15 km of the town in the hilly, volcanic landscape. Lake Nyos, a crater lake from which a limnic eruption killed nearly 2,000 people in 1986, is 25 km to the east.

== Population and language ==
In 2012 Wum's estimated population was 80,123 inhabitants.

The Aghem language, spoken in Wum, is also called Wum.

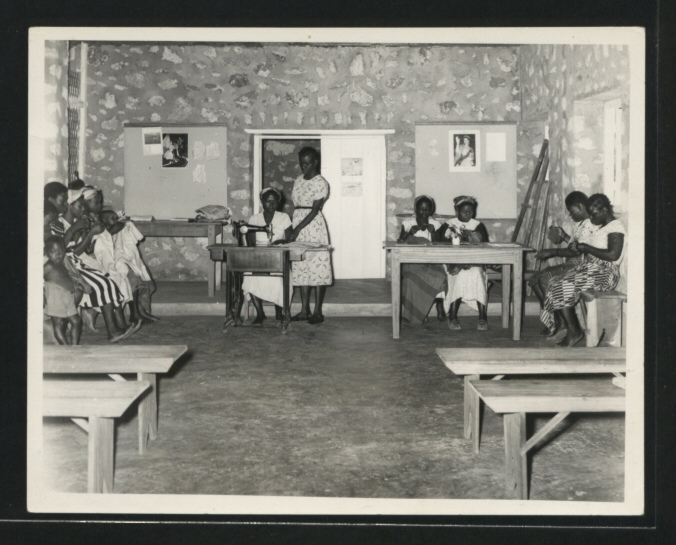
Domestic Science Centre at Wum (old photograph)

== Culture ==
Traditional clothing

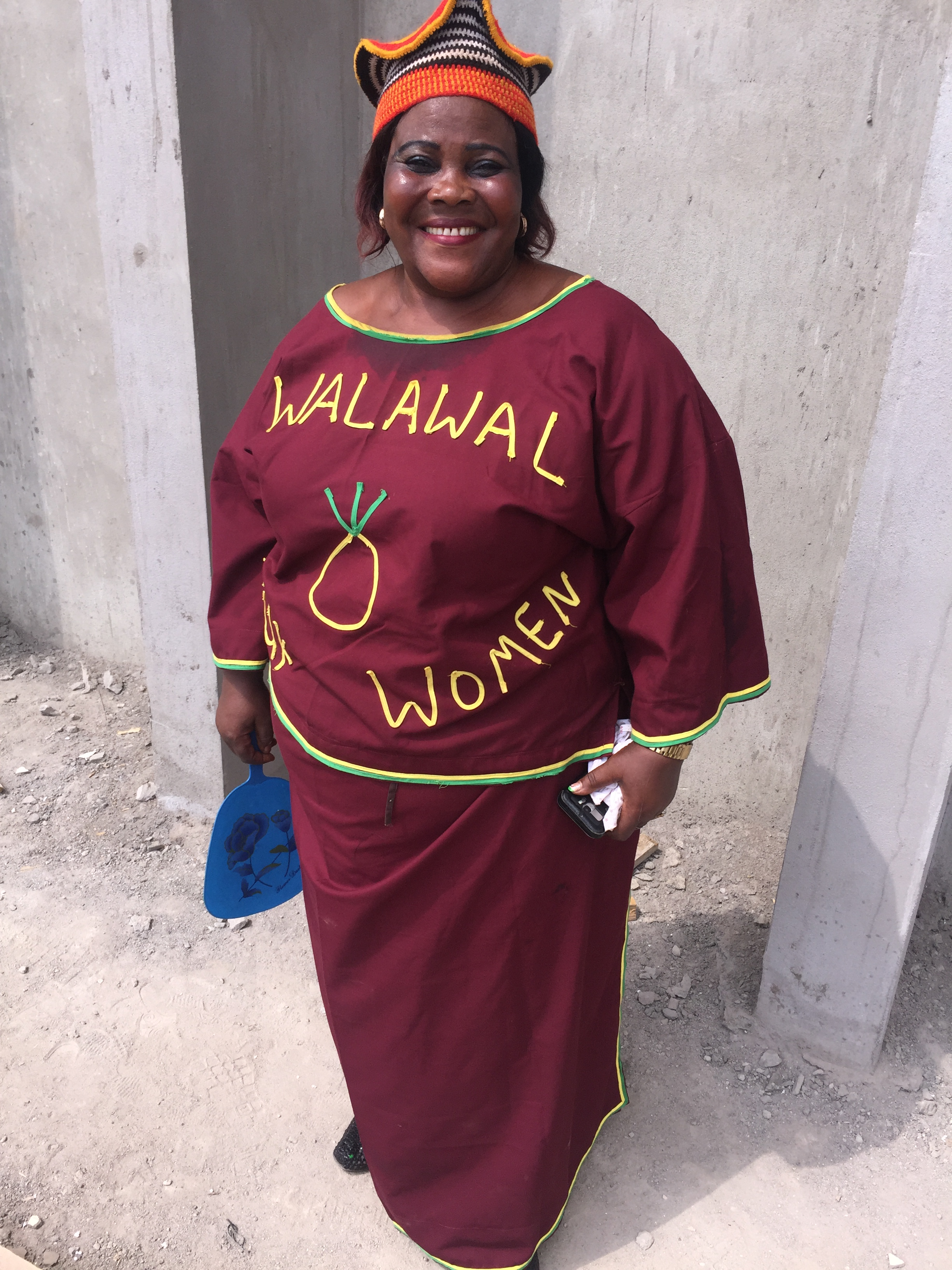

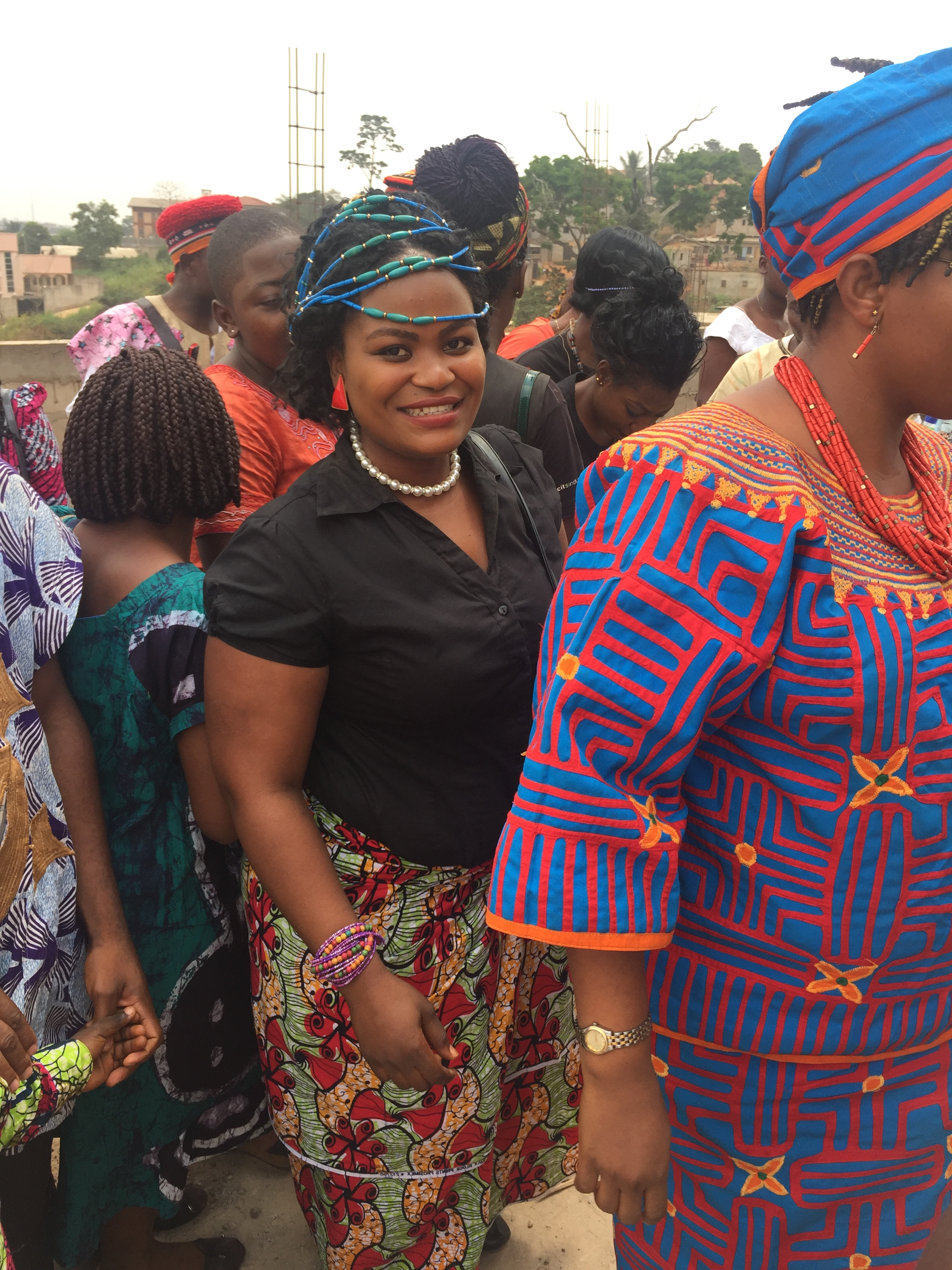

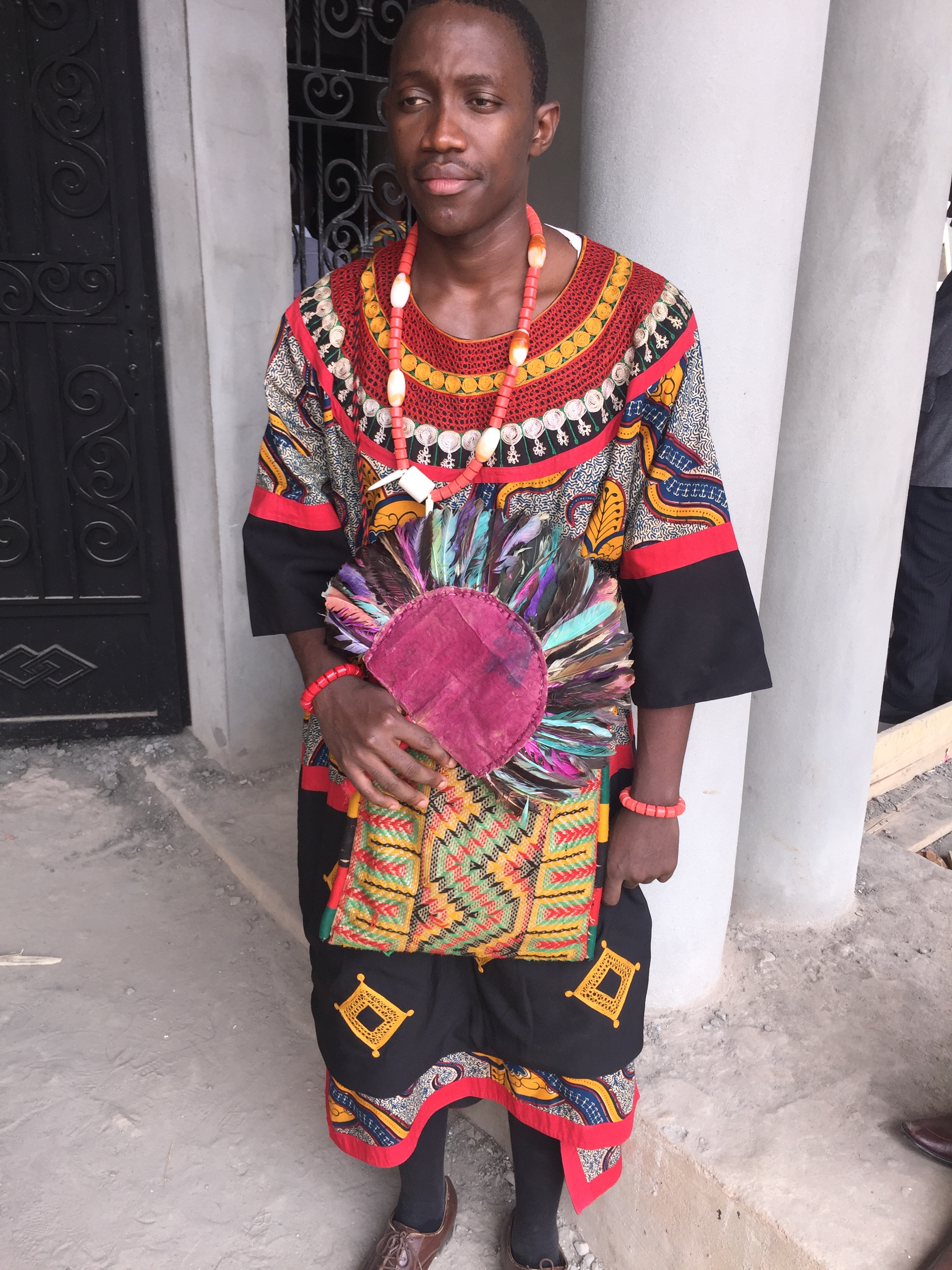

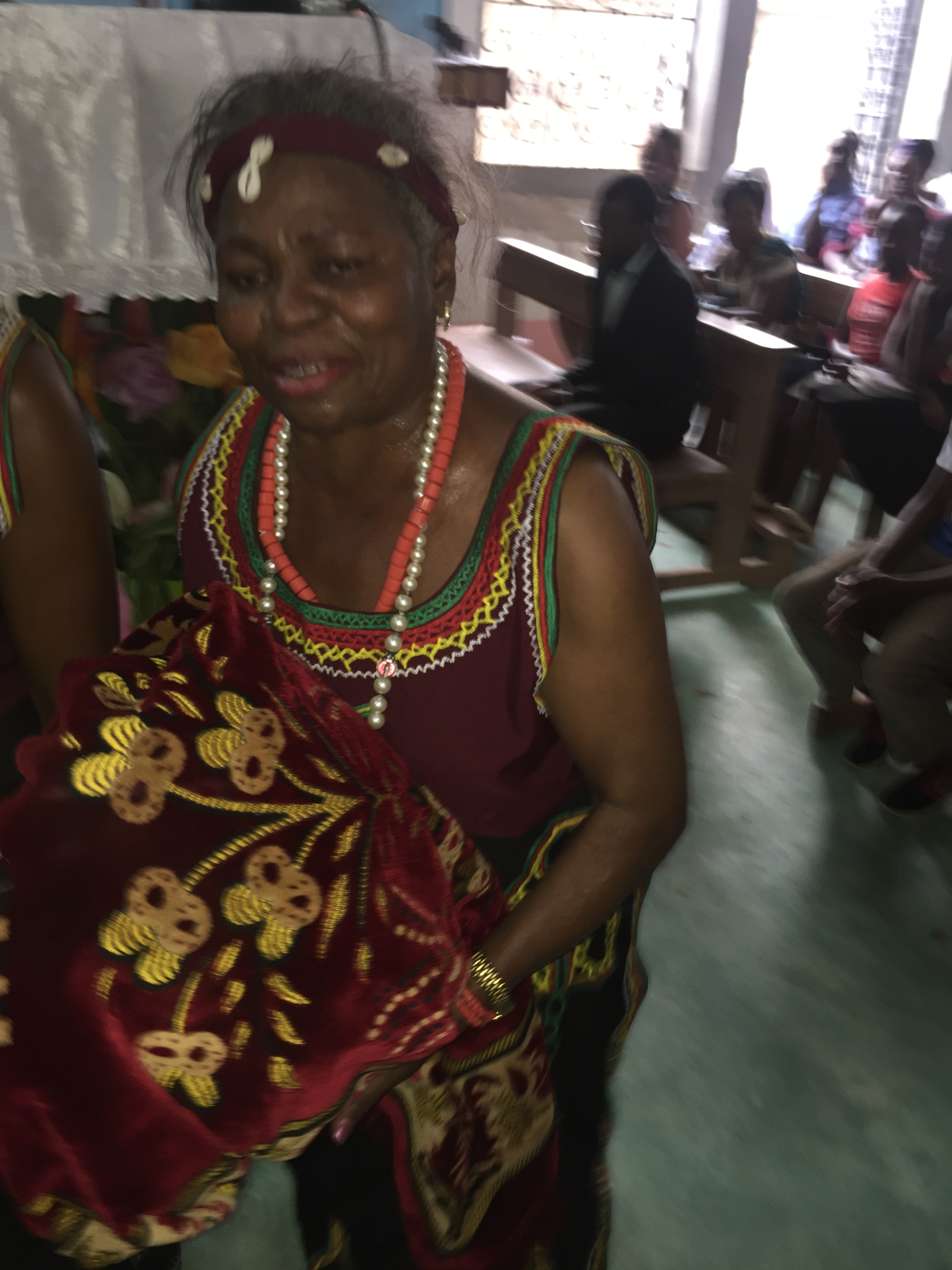

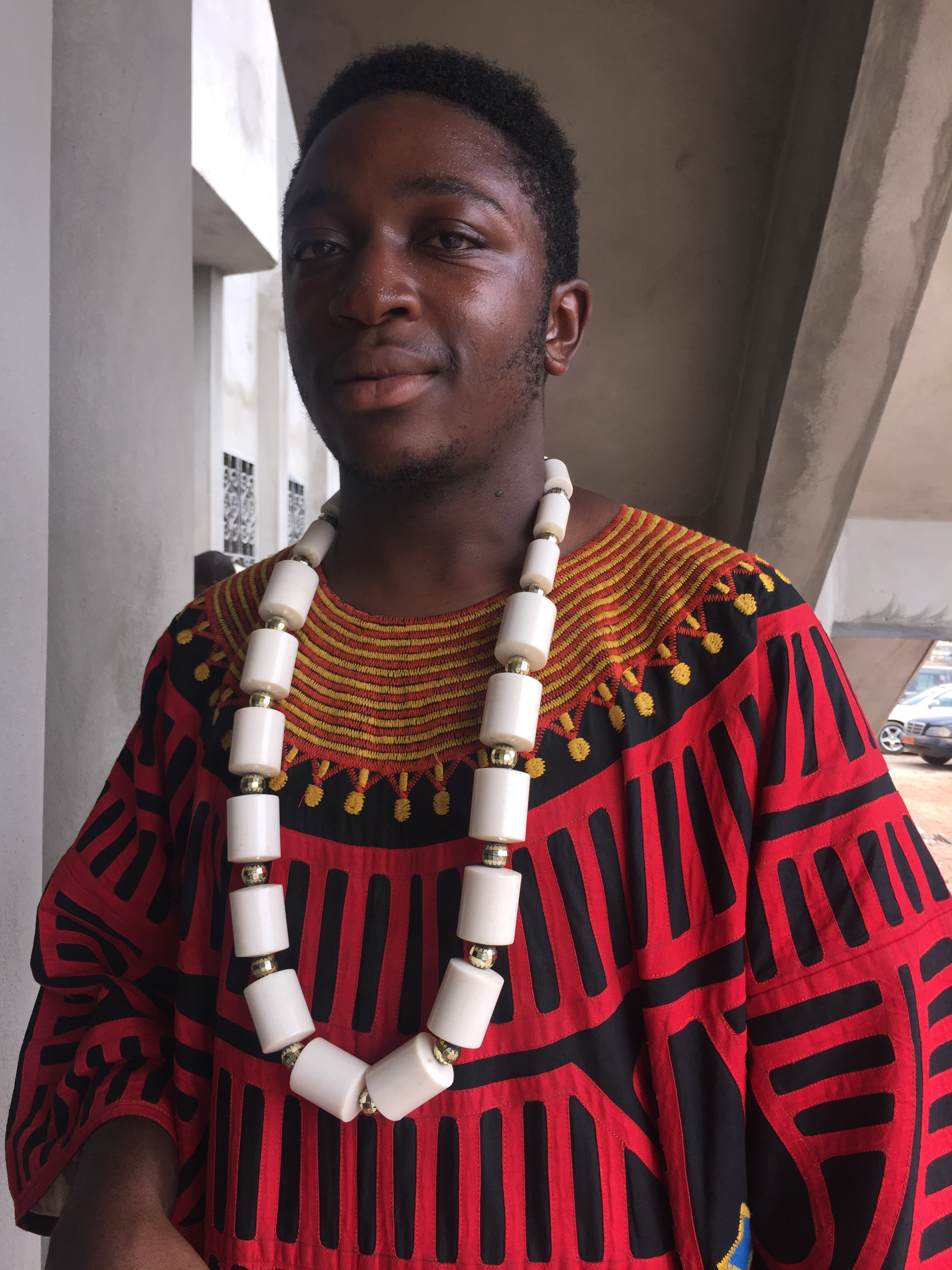

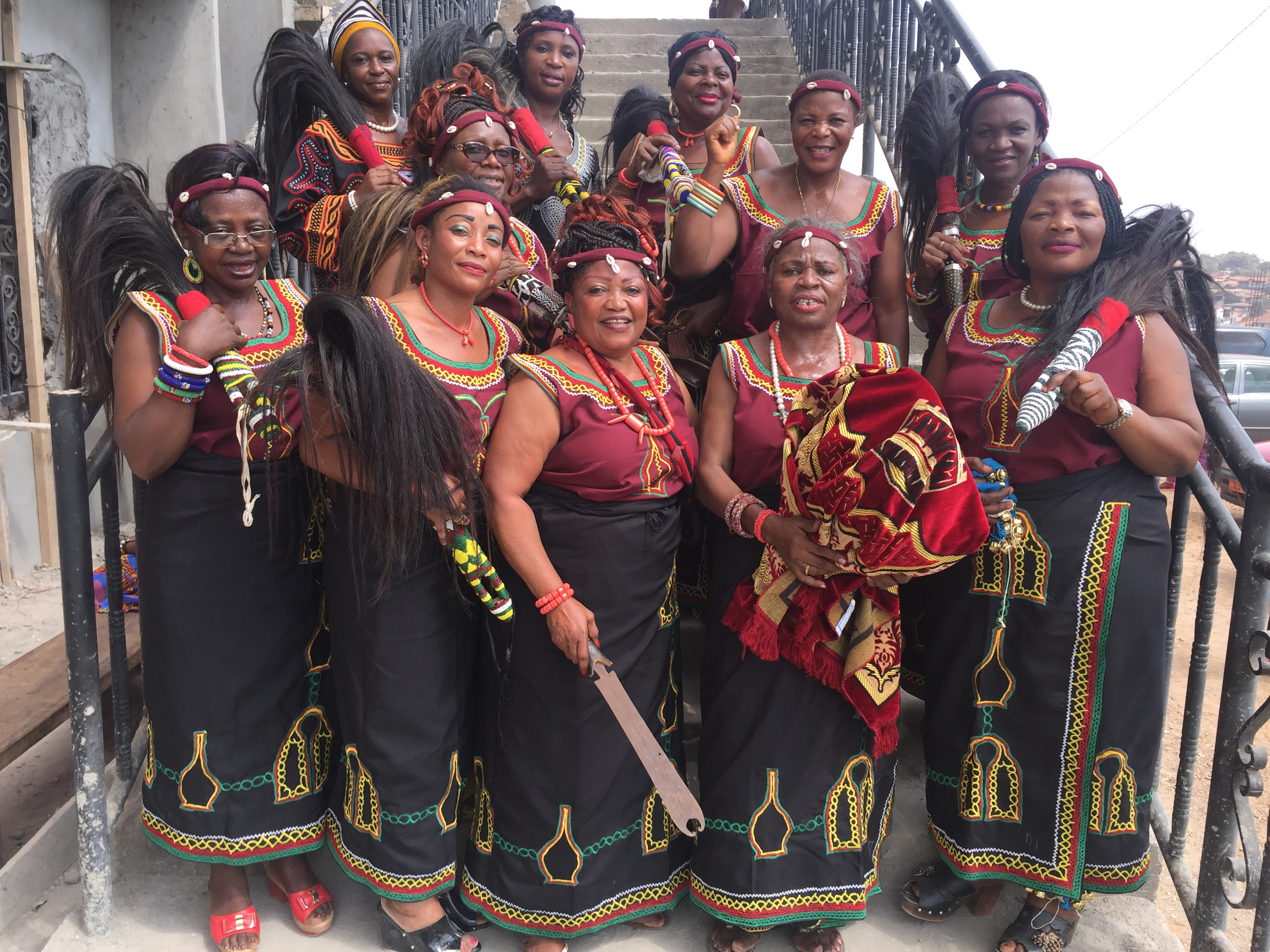

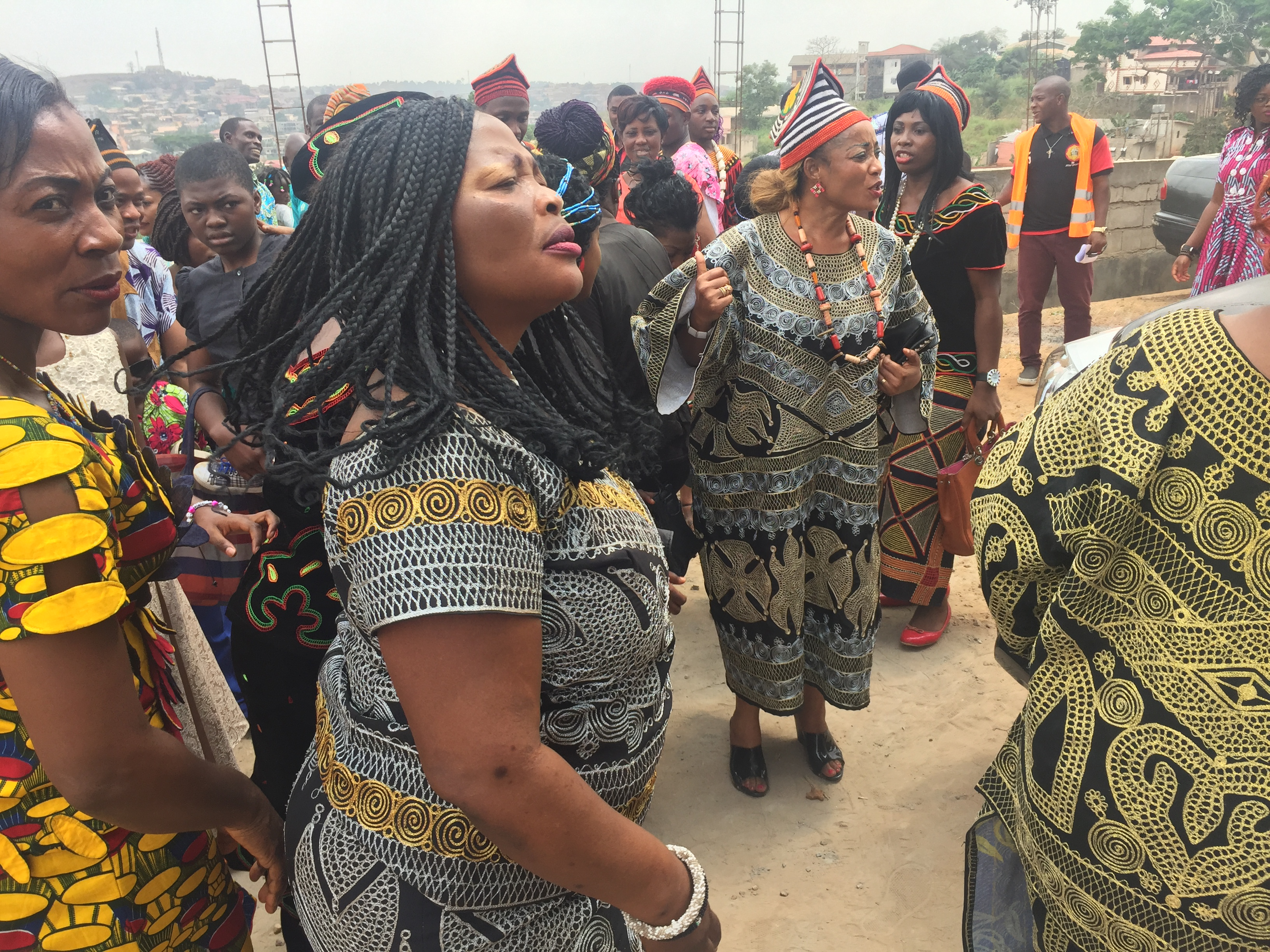

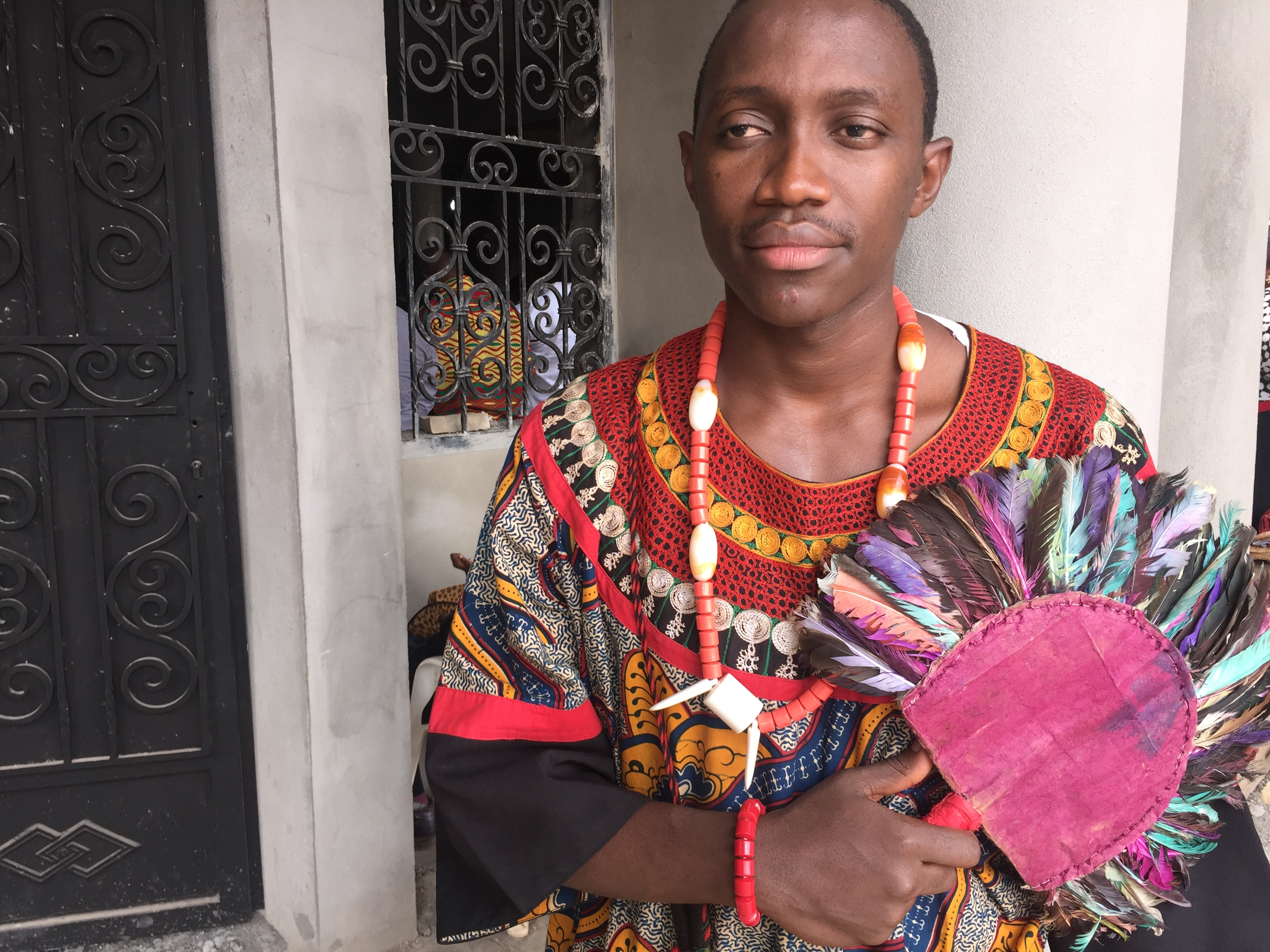

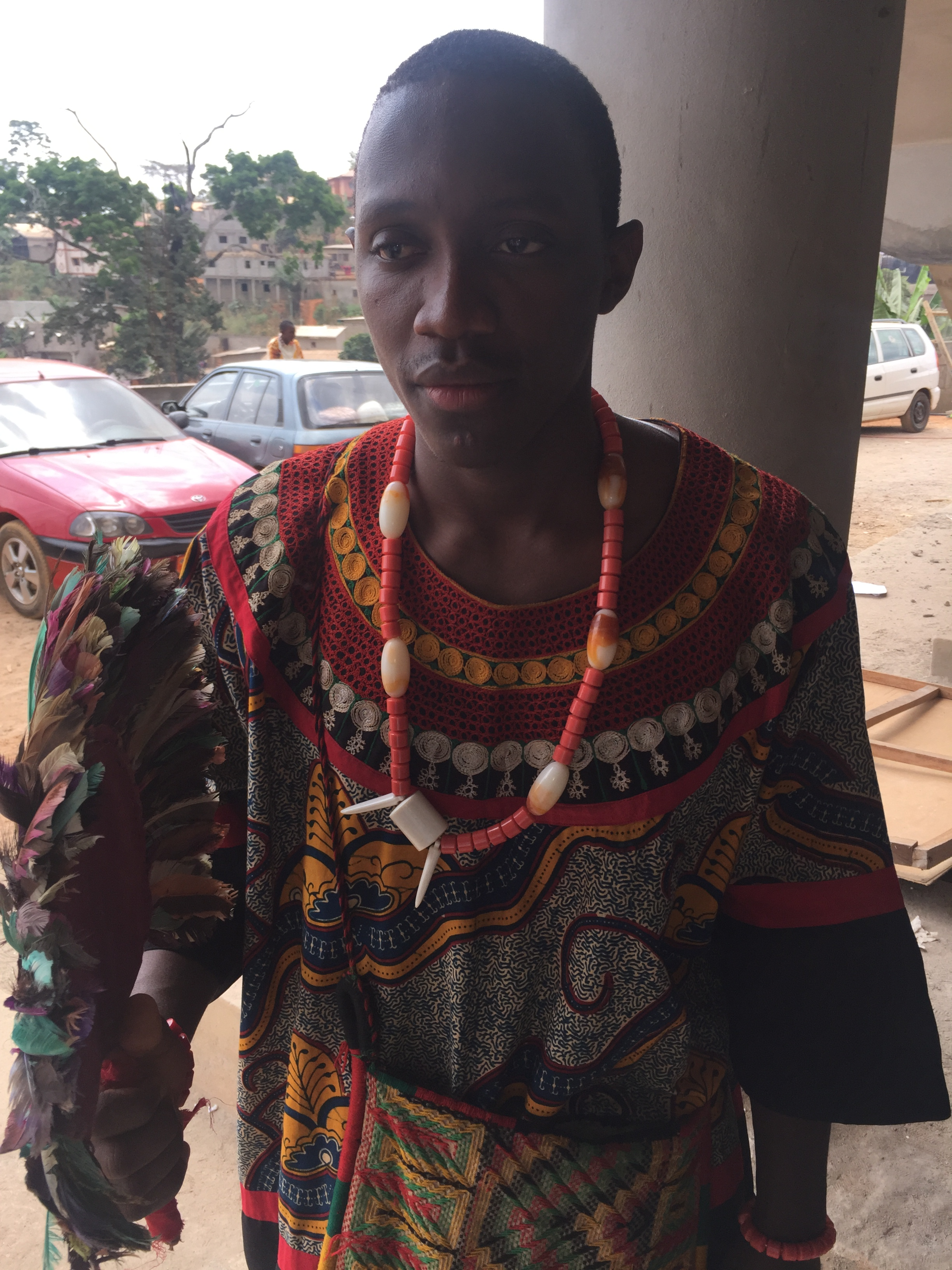

== Notable people ==
- AkuBai (Ningamai Akubai Nnam), singer and entrepreneur
