= AkuBai =

Cameroonian singer

Akubai
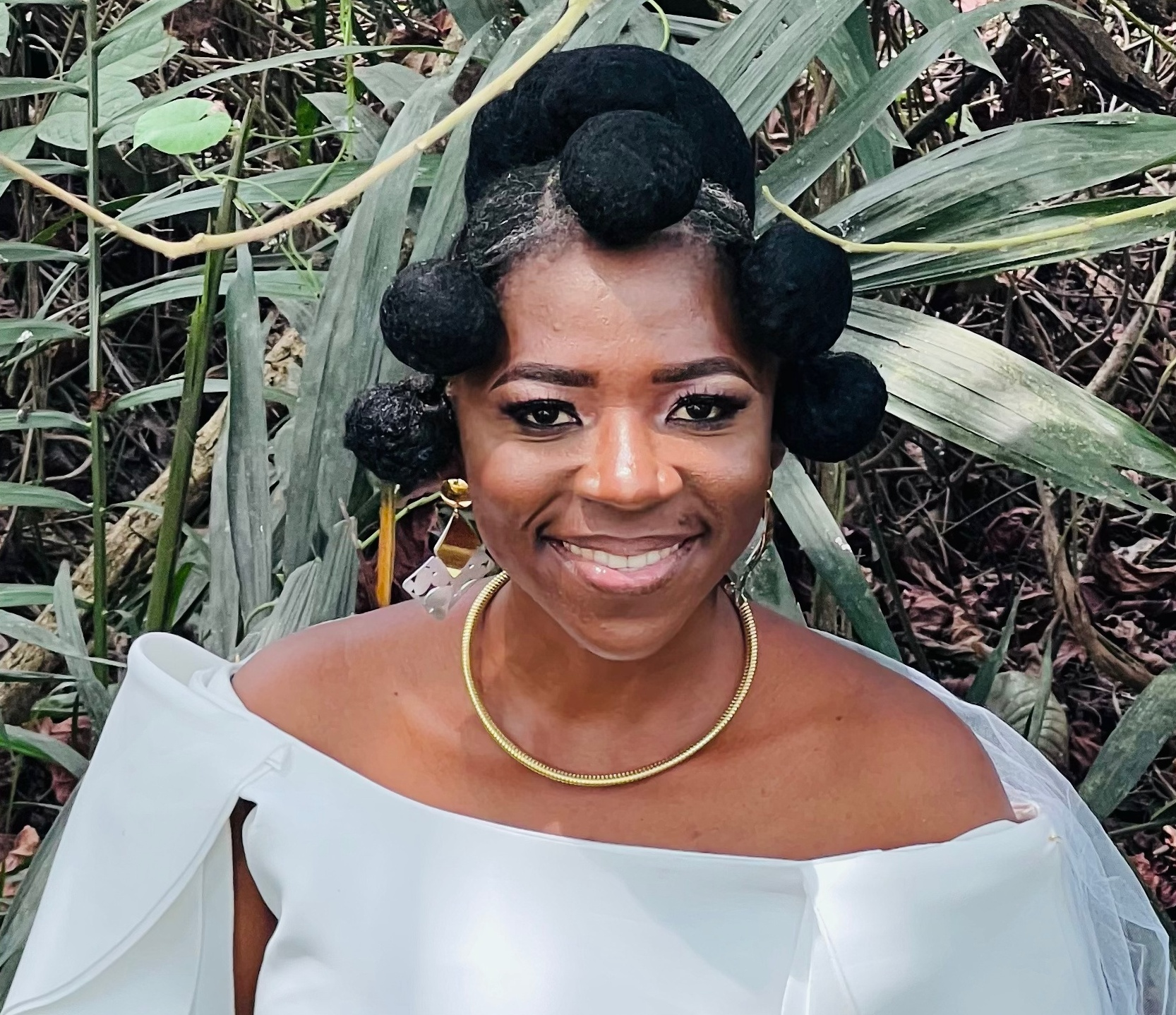
- Born: Ningamai Akubai Nnam; Wum
- Years active: 2019–present

Ningamai Akubai Nnam is a Cameroonian singer and entrepreneur. She is CEO of Impact Makers for Humanity. Akubai is best known for the 2020 song "Yahweh".

She was the first Cameroonian to win in the Media Choice Award category at the Gospel Touch Music Awards 2020 in London UK.

== Biography ==
=== Early life ===
AkuBai was born in Wum in the Northwest Region, Cameroon.

=== Career ===
AkuBai starts her musical career in 2019. She produces her musical works under the Niki Heat Entertainment label. AkuBai has been practicing praise since 2004. Her songs are in French, English and several local languages such as pidgin, Ewondo, Bassa, Mankon, weh and Bamileke languages.

She is the founder of Impact Makers for Humanity.

== Discography ==
=== Albums ===
- The Genesis: Live EP (2020)

=== Selected singles ===
- Great God (2019)
- Yahweh (2020)
- Triompher (2020)
- Tchapeusi (Le jour du jugement) (2021)
- Dieu te Voit (2021)
- More of You (2022)

== Awards and nominations ==
Gospel Touch Music Awards 2020

Year	Nominee / work	Award	Result
2020	Herself	Media Choice Award	Won

Best Gospel Artist

Year	Nominee / work	Award	Result
2020	Herself	Muzikol Music Awards	Nominated
2020	Herself	Green Light Awards	Nominated
2020	Herself	Transgenerational Forces Impact Awards	Nominated

Year	Nominee / work	Award	Result
2021	Herself	Canal 2'or Awards Act 13	Nominated
2021	Herself	Balafon Music Awards	Nominated
2021	Herself	Muzikol Music Awards	Nominated
2021	Herself	Cameroon Music Evolution Awards	Nominated

== See also ==
- List of Cameroonians
- List of African musicians
