= Komo people (Democratic Republic of the Congo) =

Ethnic group

Kumu
WaKumu/BaKumu

Total population
- c. 400.000

Regions with significant populations
- Democratic Republic of the Congo: 400.000 speakers of Komo language (1998)

Languages
- Komo, Swahili, French

Religion
- Traditional religion, Catholicism

Related ethnic groups
- Shi, Hunde, other Eastern Bantu peoples

Kumu/Komo
- Person: Mukumu
- People: Wa/Bakumu
- Language: Kikuumu
- Country: Bukumu

The Kumu or Komo are a Bantu people from Central Africa that lives in the northeast of the Democratic Republic of the Congo.

== Ethnonomy ==
Depending on the sources and context, there are several forms: Babira, Bakomo, Bakumbu, Bakumu, Komos, Kumo, Kumu, Kuumu, Wakumu.

== Language ==
Their language is Komo (or Kikomo), a Bantu language which was estimated to have 400,000 speakers in the Democratic Republic of the Congo in 1998.

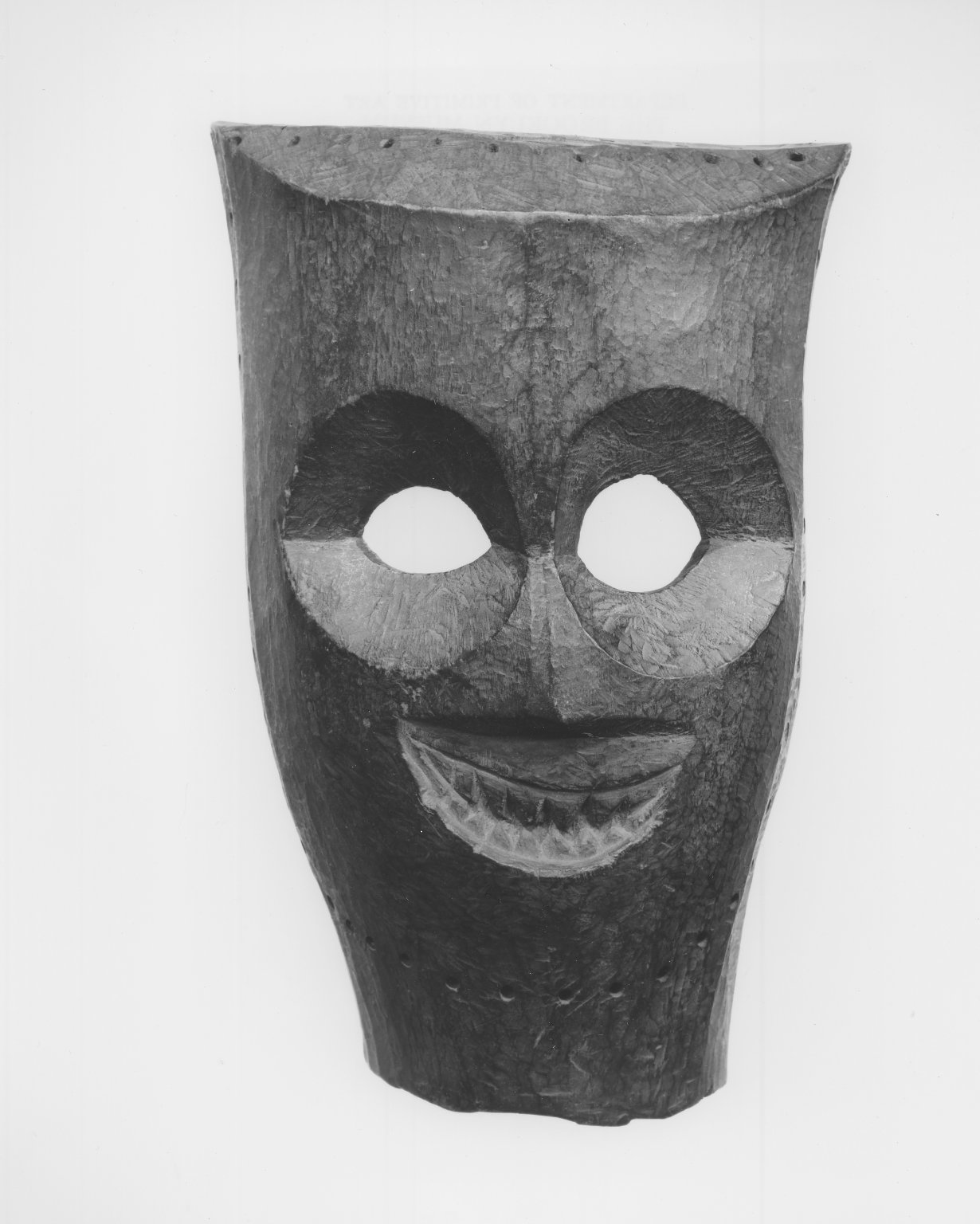
Mask.

== Religion ==
The Komo traditionally believe in creators of worlds (Muungu) and demiurges (Nkya). There are astral legends. Before farming and hunting begin, rituals with sacrifices to the spirits are performed. There is also a belief in magic. Part of the population is Catholic (mainly urban residents).
