= Vanuma language =

Bantu language spoken in DR Congo

Vanuma
- South Nyali
- Native to: Democratic Republic of the Congo
- Region: Ituri Province
- Native speakers: (6,700 cited 1993)
- Language family: Niger–Congo?: Atlantic–Congo; Benue–Congo; Bantoid; Bantu (Zone D.30); Nyali; Vanuma

Language codes
- ISO 639-3: vau
- Glottolog: vanu1242
- Guthrie code: D.331

Vanuma (Bvanuma), or South Nyali, is a minor Bantu language of the Democratic Republic of the Congo. It is lexically similar to Ndaka and Budu, Mbo, and Nyali.
