= Furu languages =

Proposed group of languages of Cameroon

Furu
- Geographic distribution: Furu-Awa Subdivision, Cameroon
- Linguistic classification: Niger–Congo?: Atlantic–Congo; Volta–Congo; Benue–Congo; Bantoid; Southern Bantoid; Beboid?; Furu

Language codes
- Glottolog: None

The Furu languages are a proposed group of poorly attested extinct or nearly extinct and otherwise unclassified Southern Bantoid languages of Cameroon. Suggested Furu languages are:

Bikya (Furu), Bishuo, Busuu, ?Lubu

Word lists for the first three languages were compiled by Michel Dieu, but after his death they were apparently lost. His lexicostatistical calculations were published in Breton (1993, 1995). Roland Kiessling revisited the remote area in 2007, and was able to show that they are normal Bantoid languages; they may perhaps be Beboid (Blench 2011). Lubu is unattested, only recalled as the language of the grandparents of the village elders.

== Bibliography ==
- Breton, Roland (1995) 'Les Furu et leur voisins', Cahier Sciences Humaines, 31, 1, 17–48.
- Breton, Roland (1993) 'Is there a Furu Language Group? An investigation on the Cameroon-Nigeria Border', The Journal of West African Languages, 23, 2, 97–98.
- Blench, Roger, 2011. 'The membership and internal structure of Bantoid and the border with Bantu'. Bantu IV, Humboldt University, Berlin.
