= Lung language =

Southern Bantoid language of Cameroon

Lung
- Native to: Cameroon
- Extinct: early 20th century
- Language family: Niger–Congo?: Atlantic–Congo; Benue–Congo; Southern Bantoid; Western Beboid (geographic); Ajumbu–Lung; Lung

Language codes
- ISO 639-3: None (mis)
- Glottolog: None

Lung is a poorly attested extinct language that appears to have been closely related to Ajumbu, a Southern Bantoid language of Cameroon.
