= Nyali languages =

Clade of Bantu languages

Nyali
- Budu–Ndaka
- Linguistic classification: Niger–Congo?: Atlantic–Congo; Benue–Congo; Southern Bantoid; Bantu (Zone D.33); Lebonya ?; Nyali

Language codes
- ISO 639-3: –
- Glottolog: nyal1255

The Nyali languages are a clade of Bantu languages coded Zone D.33 in Guthrie's classification. They are:

Budu, Ndaka, Nyali, Vanuma, Mbo

They might belong in with the Mbole–Enya languages, but the connection could be with Lengola, which constitutes the Lebonya proposal (Nurse 2003).

The Nyali languages were treated as a dialect cluster by Guthrie. Ethnologue notes that Mbo, Ndaka, Budu, Vanuma, and Nyali are quite close. However, Beeke and Ngbee are more distant; Ethnologue suggests Beeke is closer to Bali, and leaves extinct Ngbee unclassified within Bantu.
