= Benakuma =

Coordinates: 6°25′N 9°55′E

- Commune and town
- Interactive map of Benakuma
- Country: Cameroon
- Region: North West
- Department: Menchum
- Time zone: UTC+1 (WAT)

Benakuma is a town and commune in Cameroon.

== See also ==
- Communes of Cameroon
- Beba Village Community in Cameroon
