= Ngbee language =

Extinct Bantu language of DR Congo

Ngbee
- Lingbee
- Native to: Democratic Republic of the Congo
- Ethnicity: Mangbele
- Extinct: By the 1960s
- Language family: Niger–Congo?: Atlantic–Congo; Benue–Congo; Bantoid; Bantu; Boan; Bomokandian; Ngbele–Ngenda; Ngbee

Language codes
- ISO 639-3: jgb
- Glottolog: ngbe1238
- Guthrie code: D.336

Ngbee is an extinct Bantu language of uncertain affiliation. Guthrie assigned to the Nyali cluster, Ethnologue classifies it as a Nyali language. Glottolog places it near the Ngendan languages.
