= Beeke language =

Bantu language of DR Congo

Beeke
- Ibeeke
- Native to: Democratic Republic of the Congo
- Native speakers: (1,000 cited 1994)
- Language family: Niger–Congo?: Atlantic–Congo; Benue–Congo; Bantoid; Bantu (Zone D.30); Boan? (traditionally Nyali); Bali–Beeke; Beeke

Language codes
- ISO 639-3: bkf
- Glottolog: beek1238
- Guthrie code: D.335
- ELP: Beeke

Beeke is a Bantu language of uncertain affiliation. Guthrie assigned to the Nyali cluster. However, Ethnologue suggests that it may be a divergent form of Bali. It is 65% cognate with Bali, but 38% with the Nyali language Ndaka.
