= Chung language =

Eastern Beboid language of Cameroon

Chung
- Cung
- Region: Cameroon
- Native speakers: 1,400 (2001)
- Language family: Niger–Congo?: Atlantic–Congo; Benue–Congo; Southern Bantoid; Eastern Beboid; Chung

Language codes
- ISO 639-3: cnq (Note: earlier grouped with Mbuk language in cug)
- Glottolog: cung1238

Chung (Cung) is an Eastern Beboid language of Cameroon.

== Sources ==
- Blench, Roger, 2011. 'The membership and internal structure of Bantoid and the border with Bantu'. Bantu IV, Humboldt University, Berlin.
