= Komo language (Bantu) =

Bantu language spoken in DR Congo

Komo
- Kikuumu
- Native to: DR Congo
- Ethnicity: Wakumu, Bakumu
- Native speakers: (400,000 cited 1998)
- Language family: Niger–Congo?: Atlantic–Congo; Volta-Congo; Benue–Congo; Bantoid; Southern Bantoid; Bantu (Zone D.20–30); Boan; Komo

Language codes
- ISO 639-3: kmw
- Glottolog: komo1260
- Guthrie code: D.23

Komo is a Bantu language spoken by half a million people in the Democratic Republic of the Congo, including an area around the major upriver port of Kisangani.

== Phonology ==
=== Consonants ===
		Labial	Alveolar	Palatal	Velar	Labio- velar
Plosive/ Affricate	voiceless	p	t	t͡ʃ	k	k͡p
Plosive/ Affricate	voiced	b	d	d͡ʒ	ɡ	ɡ͡b
Plosive/ Affricate	prenasal	ᵐb	ⁿd	ᶮd͡ʒ	ᵑɡ	ᵑɡ͡b
Plosive/ Affricate	implosive	ɓ	ɗ	ʄ		
Fricative		ɸ	s			
Nasal		m	n	ɲ		
Approximant			l			

=== Vowels ===
	Front	Central	Back
Close	i		u
Close-mid	e		o
Open-mid	ɛ		ɔ
Open		a	

== See also ==
Komo people (Democratic Republic of the Congo)
