= Kari language =

Bantu language spoken in Central Africa

Kare
- Li-Kari-Li
- Native to: Democratic Republic of the Congo, Central African Republic
- Native speakers: nearly extinct? (2007) elderly speakers only
- Language family: Niger–Congo?: Atlantic–Congo; Benue–Congo; Bantoid; Bantu; Boan; Bomokandian; Ngbele–Ngenda; Kare

Language codes
- ISO 639-3: kbj
- Glottolog: kari1306
- Guthrie code: D.301
- ELP: Kari

Kare or Kari is a poorly documented Congolese Bantu language of uncertain affiliation (though listed as unclassified Zone D.30 by Guthrie). There are scattered speakers in the Central African Republic.
