= Bali language (DRC) =

Bantu language spoken in DR Congo

Bali
- Dhibali
- Native to: DR Congo
- Native speakers: 500,000 (2018)
- Language family: Niger–Congo?: Atlantic–Congo; Benue–Congo; Bantoid; Bantu (Zone D.20–30); Boan; Bali–Beeke ?; Bali

Language codes
- ISO 639-3: bcp
- Glottolog: bali1274
- Guthrie code: D.21

- People: Babali
- Language: Dhibali

Bali (Baali, Kibali, Libaali) is a Bantu language spoken in the Bafwasende Territory of the Democratic Republic of the Congo. It has been included in Boan and seems to be most closely related to Lika.
