= Homa language =

Extinct South Sudanese Bantu language

Homa
- Native to: South Sudan
- Extinct: by 1975
- Language family: Niger–Congo?: Atlantic–Congo; Volta-Congo; Benue–Congo; Bantoid; Southern Bantoid; Bantu (Zone D.20); Boan; Bomokandian; Ngendan; Homa

Language codes
- ISO 639-3: hom
- Glottolog: homa1239
- Guthrie code: D.304

Homa is an extinct South Sudanese Bantu language of uncertain affiliation. It has been included in the Boan languages.
