= Mbuʼ language =

Southern Bantoid language of Cameroon

Mbuʼ
- Ajumbu
- Native to: Cameroon
- Native speakers: 200 (2011)
- Language family: Niger–Congo?: Atlantic–Congo; Volta–Congo; Benue–Congo; Southern Bantoid; Western Beboid (geographic); Ajumbu–Lung; Mbuʼ

Language codes
- ISO 639-3: muc
- Glottolog: mbuu1238
- ELP: Ajumbu

Mbuʼ, or Ajumbu, is a Southern Bantoid language of Cameroon. It is traditionally classified as a Western Beboid language, but that has not been demonstrated to be a valid family. Inasmuch as Western Beboid may be valid, Mbuʼ would appear to be the most divergent of its languages.

"Mbuʼ" is the name of the village the language is spoken in.

== Phonology ==
Mbu' Consonant phonemes
		Labial	Dental	Palatal		Velar		Glottal
		Labial	Dental	Plain	Labialized	Plain	Labial	Glottal
Nasal		m	n̪	ɲ		ŋ		
Plosive	voiceless		t̪			k	kp	ʔ
Plosive	voiced	b	d̪			g	gb	
Affricate	voiceless		t̪s̪	tʃ				
Affricate	voiced		d̪z̪	dʒ				
Fricative	voiceless	f	s̪	ʃ				
Fricative	voiced	v	z̪	ʒ		ɣ		
Approximant			l̪	j	ɥ		w	

Mbu' Vowel Phonemes
	Front	Central	Back
Close	i y	ɨ	u
Mid	e ɛ	ə	o ɔ
Open		a	

There are three tones; high, mid, and low.
