= Ndaka people =

Regions with significant populations
- Ituri Forest, Democratic Republic of the Congo: 39,000

Languages
- Ndaka language

The Ndaka people (of Ndaaka) are a Bantu ethnic group of the northeastern Democratic Republic of the Congo, many of whom live in the Mambasa Territory of the Ituri Province.

All young Ndaka men had to be initiated to become full adult members of the tribe. The ceremonies are held every six years or so, and involve traditional songs and dances. In some of these special instruments are used, and masked ritualists act out prescribed roles dressed in full costume.
