= Mbo language (Congo) =

Language of the Democratic Republic of the Congo

Mbo
- Native to: Democratic Republic of the Congo
- Region: Orientale Province
- Ethnicity: Mbo people
- Native speakers: (11,000 cited 1994)
- Language family: Niger–Congo?: Atlantic–Congo; Benue–Congo; Bantoid; Bantu (Zone D.30); Nyali (Budu–Ndaka); Mbo

Language codes
- ISO 639-3: zmw
- Glottolog: mbod1238
- Guthrie code: D.334

The Mbo language (or Imbo, Kimbo) is spoken by the Mbo people in the Democratic Republic of the Congo. In 1994 there were about 11,000 speakers. It is lexically similar to the Ndaka and Budu, Vanuma and Nyali languages.
