= Kehek =

The Kehek (or Qeheq) were a minor Ancient Libyan group that battled with the Egyptians during the New Kingdom of Egypt. They spoke the Kehek language which is the earliest attested non-Semitic and non-Egyptian Afroasiatic language, though other details are not known about it except for possible links with proto-Berber. They are mentioned in Papyrus Anastasi I as part of Egyptian troops in theoretical invasion to Djahy along with Sherden, Meswesh, Nubians and Egyptian archers. They were also employed as an auxiliary foreign corps in Egypt after their defeat to Ramses III, in Memphis in 1188 B.C.

Amenhotep I's efforts to expand the Egyptian borders faced him with an enemy named Kehek or Qeheq.
