= Lika language =

Bantu language of DR Congo

Lika
- Native to: Democratic Republic of the Congo
- Native speakers: (60,000 cited 1989)
- Language family: Niger–Congo?: Atlantic–Congo; Benue–Congo; Bantoid; Bantu (Zone D.20); Boan?; Bomokandian; Lika

Language codes
- ISO 639-3: lik
- Glottolog: lika1243
- Guthrie code: D.201

Lika (Liko) is a poorly documented Congolese Bantu language of uncertain affiliation, though it has been included in Boan.
