= Kehek language =

Extinct language of Ancient Libya

Kehek
- Qeheq
- Region: Eastern parts of Ancient Libya
- Ethnicity: Kehek
- Era: 2nd–1st millennia BC
- Language family: Afro-Asiatic: Berber ?; Kehek
- Writing system: No indigenous writing, attested in only a hieratic papyrus

Language codes
- ISO 639-3: None (mis)
- Glottolog: None

The Kehek language was an Afroasiatic language spoken by the Kehek people of Ancient Libya. It is the earliest written non-Semitic and non-Egyptian Afroasiatic language. It is only attested scarcely in papyrus texts written in hieratic, pertaining to snake magic, written during the New Kingdom era. Whether other ancient Libyans such as the Meshwesh or the Libu spoke the same language as the Kehek is unknown. The language might also be the earliest example of a written down Berber, or Proto-Berber variety though its nature as a fragmentary text makes it hard to identify as anything other than Afro-Asiatic.

== Phonology ==
The language's phonemic inventory seems very similar to the currently proposed phonology of Proto-Berber, even more so than Egyptian, Semitic, or the Nilo-Saharan languages.

		Labial	Alveolar	Postalveolar	Palatal	Velar	Uvular	Glottal
Nasal		m	n					
Plosive	voiceless	p	t			k	q	
Plosive	voiced	b	ḏ (possibly ḍ)					
Fricative	voiceless		s	š [ʃ]				h
Fricative	voiced		z		y			
Approximant		w			j			
Trill			r					

== The "Turin papyrus" and analysis ==
Full text of the best preserved part of the papyrus in Kehek:

yꜣ-wꜣ-y ṯꜣ-r-mꜣ-tj

j-smj tj-t-yw-t [mꜣ] ṯꜣ-r-mꜣ-tj

j-smj jw-š -mj-š-tj-n-kꜣ ṯꜣ-r-mꜣ-t

j-smj tꜣ-š ṯꜣ-r-mꜣ-tj

j-smj mꜣ-n-qꜣ-nꜣ-ṯꜣ-r-mꜣ-tj

j-smj j-ṯꜣ-r-bw ṯꜣ-r-mꜣ-tj mꜣ-y

j-smj š-h-j-pꜣ-tꜣ ṯꜣ-r-mꜣ-tj

The papyrus is located in the University of Turin, and has been previously misinterpreted as being a war chant, though it is now interpreted as a chant against snakes.

=== Analysis and links to modern Berber ===
The only verifiable word in the text is ṯꜣ-r-mꜣ, probably meaning snake. As it was written in hieratic, many of the language's consonants may not have been present in hieratic, however ṯꜣ is known to have been used in other texts transliterating other languages (mainly semitic ones) to mark sounds such as zˤ. If this was the case, it would mean that Kehek "zˤ-r-m-t" (possibly vocalized as "aẓramat") shares the same consonantal root for the word as modern Berber "zˤrm" (for example, Kabyle aẓrem), also meaning snake. Other words that don't have known meaning but may be identified with modern Berber cognates are the following:

Possible Kehek words and cognates with modern Berber languages according to Jason P. Silvestri.
Kehek lexeme	Possible vocalization	Modern Berber cognates	Notes
yꜣw-šꜣ-ḏꜣw-w	*yǎšǎḍǎw	Lexeme "šḍ", present across various languages (such as Shilha, Nafusi and Kabyle), meaning "to glide, slither, slide".	Verb, "y-" might be 3rd masculine prefix
yꜣ-wꜣ-y	*yaway	Lexeme "wy", meaning "to carry/bring".	Inflected verb, "y-" present
j-smj	*asama *azma	Related either to lexem "sm" meaning "name" across all Berber languages or "zm" meaning "to curse/slander" in the Tuareg languages.	Verb (?)
tꜣ-š	*taša	Modern Berber "to eat"	Verb (?)
m'-n-qꜣ-nꜣ	*manqan *amanɣan	Lexeme "nq" or "nɣ" meaning to kill.	Noun
ṯꜣ-r-bw	*zarub	Lexeme "zrb" meaning to "to burn" in Shilha and the Tuareg languages.	Verb
sꜣ-kꜣ-r-q	*sakaraq	Lexeme "skr" meaning to make	Inflected verb
