= Naki language =

Bantoid language spoken in West Africa

Naki
- Munkaf
- Region: Cameroon, Nigeria
- Native speakers: (2,000 cited 1993)
- Language family: Niger–Congo?: Atlantic–Congo; Benue–Congo; Southern Bantoid; Eastern Beboid; Naki

Language codes
- ISO 639-3: Either: mff – Naki (Cameroon) jms – Mashi
- Glottolog: naki1240
- ELP: Naki

Naki, or Munkaf, is an Eastern Beboid language of Cameroon and Nigeria. There is no name for the language; it is known by the villages it is spoken in, including Naki and Mekaf (Munkaf) in Cameroon and Mashi in Nigeria, the latter listed as a separate language by Ethnologue, though it is not distinct.

== Phonology ==
Naki is a tonal language. It has a high tone /á/, a low tone /à/, a rising tone /ǎ/, and a falling tone /â/.

Naki has eight phonemic vowels. These are as follows:

Vowel Phonemes
	Front	Central	Back
Close	i		u
Close-mid	e	ə	o
Open-mid	ɛ	ə	ɔ
Open	a		

The consonants are as follows.

Consonants
		Labial	Coronal	Palatal	Velar
Plosive	voiceless	p	t tʷ	c cʷ	k kʷ
Plosive	voiced	b bʷ bʲ	d		g gʷ
Affricate	voiceless	f fʷ fʲ	t͡s t͡sʷ t͡sʲ		
Affricate	voiced		d͡z	d͡ʒ d͡ʒʷ	
Fricative	voiceless		s	ʃ ʃʷ ʃʲ	
Fricative	voiced			ʒ	
Nasal		m mʷ	n	ɲ	ŋ
Approximant		w	l	j jʷ	

There are also the labio-velar plosives k͡p and g͡b.

== Sources ==
- Blench, Roger, 2011. 'The membership and internal structure of Bantoid and the border with Bantu'. Bantu IV, Humboldt University, Berlin.
