= Mbo, Central African Republic =

Mbo
- Location in Central African Republic
- Coordinates: 8°5′57″N 18°42′44″E
- Country: Central African Republic
- Prefecture: Ouham-Fafa
- Sub-prefecture: Sido
- Commune: Sido

Mbo, also spelled Mboh, is a village situated in Ouham-Fafa Prefecture, Central African Republic.

== History ==
UPC captured Mbo on 20 October 2023, causing the residents to flee to the bush. On the same day, FACA recaptured the village. CPC attacked Mbo on 24 November 2023.

== Education ==
There is a school in the village.
