= Ludwig Gerhardt =

German linguist

- Born: November 1, 1938 (age 87); Halle an der Saale, Germany
- Occupation: Linguist

Academic background
- Education: University of Hamburg

Academic work
- Institutions: University of Hamburg
- Main interests: Languages of Africa

Ludwig Gerhardt (born November 1, 1938, in Halle an der Saale) is a German linguist and Africanist. He is known for his work on various languages of Africa, particularly the Plateau languages of Nigeria.

== Education ==
Ludwig Gerhardt is the son of Dietrich Kurt Gerhardt. He attended school in Zorbau from 1944 to 1945, in Halle an der Saale from 1945 to 1946, in Erlangen from 1946 to 1948, and grammar school from 1948 to 1958 in Münster. After graduating from high school in 1958 at the Schillergymnasium, Münster, he served in the military from 1958 to 1959, where he was a first lieutenant.

Gerhardt studied African studies, phonetics and ethnomusicology at the University of Hamburg from 1959 to 1967, where he obtained a doctorate in 1967.

== Career ==
Gerhardt performed fieldwork on the Plateau languages of north-central Nigeria in 1968–1969, and on the Jarawan languages of Nigeria in 1982–1983.

From 1968 to 1970 and 1973–1975, he was a research assistant at the University of Hamburg. From 1972 to 1973, he had a postdoctoral fellowship from the DFG. After completing his habilitation in 1974, he became Professor of African Studies at the University of Hamburg in 1975.
