= Beboid languages =

Language groups spoken in Cameroon and Nigeria

Beboid
- Geographic distribution: Southwest Cameroon, southeast Nigeria
- Linguistic classification: Niger–Congo?: Atlantic–Congo; Volta–Congo; Benue–Congo; Bantoid; Southern Bantoid; Beboid
- Subdivisions: Eastern Beboid; Western Beboid; Furu?

Language codes
- Glottolog: None bebo1243 Eastern Beboid + Bikya yemn1234 Yemne–Kimbi
- The Beboid languages shown in western Cameroon and eastern Nigeria

The Beboid languages are any of two families of Southern Bantoid languages spoken principally in southwest Cameroon, although two (Bukwen and Mashi) are spoken over the border in southeast Nigeria. The Eastern Beboid languages may be most closely related to the Tivoid and Momo groups. The Western Beboid languages may be closer to Ekoid and Bantu.

Previous research includes a study of noun classes in Beboid languages by Jean-Marie Hombert (1980), Larry Hyman (1980, 1981), a dissertation by Richards (1991) concerning the phonology of three eastern Beboid languages (Noni, Ncane and Nsari), Lux (2003) a Noni lexicon and Cox (2005) a phonology of Kemezung.

== Languages ==
SIL International survey reports have provided more detail on Eastern and Western Beboid (Brye & Brye 2002, 2004; Hamm et al. 2002) and Hamm (2002) is a brief overview of the group as a whole.

Eastern Beboid is clearly valid; speakers recognise the relationship between their languages, their distribution is the result of recent population movements and linguistically they are similar, and they are close to the Bantu languages. The term "Beboid" sometimes refers specifically to this group. Western Beboid is not as tight-knit, and appears to be closer to the Grassfields languages. They may be called "Yemne-Kimbi" when the eastern group is called just "Beboid" (Di Carlo & Good 2012). See also Blench (2025).

- Beboid
  - Eastern Beboid (Beboid)
    - Cung, Bebe–Kemezung, Naki, Saari–Noni (Ncane-Mungong-Noone), Fio, Mbuk
  - Western Beboid (Yemne-Kimbi)
    - Fang
    - Mundabli, Buu, Koshin and apparently Bukwen
    - Mungbam and Missong
    - Mbuʼ (Ajumbu) and Lung

Also spoken in the area is Bikya (Furu), one of the Furu languages, and Kung, one of the Ring languages.

== Names and locations (Nigeria) ==
Below is a list of language names, populations, and locations (in Nigeria only) from Blench (2019).

Language	Speakers	Location(s)
Naki	one village (Belogo = Tosso 2) in Nigeria; 3000 in Cameroon (1976)	Taraba State, ca. 6°57N, 10°13E, Furu-Awa and other subdivisions in Cameroon
Bukwen		Taraba State, near Takum
Mashi	one village	Taraba State, near Takum

== See also ==
- Beboid word lists (Wiktionary)

== Bibliography ==
- Blench, Roger, 2011. 'The membership and internal structure of Bantoid and the border with Bantu'. Bantu IV, Humboldt University, Berlin.
- Blench, Roger. n.d. Beboid word lists.
- Blench, Roger. 2025. The classification of the Bukwen language [buz spoken in Mairogo, SE Nigeria]. Cambridge: Kay William Educational Foundation (KWEF).
- Brye, Edward and Elizabeth Brye. 2002. "Rapid appraisal and intelligibility testing surveys of the Eastern Beboid group of languages (Northwest Province)." SIL Electronic Survey Reports 2002-019. http://www.sil.org/silesr/2002/019/
- Pierpaolo Di Carlo & Jeff Good. 2012. What are we trying to preserve?: Diversity, change, and ideology at the edge of the Cameroonian Grassfields
- Good, Jeff, & Jesse Lovegren. 2009. 'Reassessing Western Beboid'. Bantu III.
- Good, Jeff, & Scott Farrar. 2008. 'Western Beboid and African language classification'. LSA.
- Hamm, Cameron, Diller, J., Jordan-Diller, K. & F. Assako a Tiati. 2002. A rapid appraisal survey of Western Beboid languages (Menchum Division, Northwest Province). SIL Electronic Survey Reports 2002-014. http://www.sil.org/silesr/2002/014/
- Hamm, C. 2002. Beboid Language Family of Cameroon and Nigeria: Location and Genetic Classification. SIL Electronic Survey Reports 2002
- Hombert, Jean-Marie. 1980. Noun Classes of the Beboid Languages. In Noun classes in the Grassfields Bantu borderland, SCOPIL 8. Los Angeles: University of Southern California.
