= Furu-Awa =

Coordinates: 6.8667°N 10.0333°E

- Commune and town
- Interactive map of Furu-Awa
- Country: Cameroon
- Region: Northwest Region (Cameroon)
- Department: Menchum
- Time zone: UTC+1 (WAT)

Furu-Awa is a town and district in Cameroon.

== See also ==
- Communes of Cameroon
