= Ndaka language =

Language

Ndaka
- Native to: Democratic Republic of the Congo
- Region: Ituri Province
- Ethnicity: Ndaka people
- Native speakers: (25,000 cited 1994)
- Language family: Niger–Congo?: Atlantic–Congo; Benue–Congo; Bantoid; Bantu (Zone D.30); Nyali (Budu–Ndaka); Ndaka

Language codes
- ISO 639-3: ndk
- Glottolog: ndak1241
- Guthrie code: D.333

The Ndaka language (or Indaaka, Ndaaka) is spoken by the Ndaka people in the Ituri Province, Mambasa Territory of the Democratic Republic of the Congo. It is lexically similar to the Mbo, Budu, Vanuma and Nyali languages.
