= Nyali language =

Language

Nyali
- Linyali
- Native to: Democratic Republic of the Congo
- Region: Ituri Province
- Native speakers: (43,000 cited 1993)
- Language family: Niger–Congo?: Atlantic–Congo; Benue–Congo; Bantoid; Bantu (Zone D.30); Nyali (Budu–Ndaka); Nyali

Language codes
- ISO 639-3: nlj
- Glottolog: nyal1250
- Guthrie code: D.33

Nyali, or North Nyali, is a minor Bantu language of the Democratic Republic of the Congo. It is lexically similar to Ndaka and Budu, Mbo, and Vanuma (South Nyali).
