= Boan languages =

Boan
- Ababuan
- Geographic distribution: Democratic Republic of the Congo and South Sudan
- Linguistic classification: Niger–Congo?: Atlantic–Congo; Volta-Congo; Benue–Congo; Bantoid; Southern Bantoid; Bantu (Zones C–D); Boan
- Subdivisions: Bati–Angba (Bwa); Komo–Bira

Language codes
- ISO 639-3: –
- Glottolog: abab1240

Boan (Buan, Ababuan) is a proposed intermediate group of Bantu languages coded Zones C and D in Guthrie's classification. There are three branches:

- Komo (D20)
- Bali (D20), ?Beeke
- Bomokandian (the various Bwa and Biran languages)
  - Biran (Bira–Amba) (D22, D30)
  - Homa (Ngenda) (D40)
  - Lika (D20)
  - Bati–Angba (Bwa) (C40)

Beeke is an erstwhile member of the Nyali cluster that seems to be closest to Bali.

In the Glottolog 2.3 classification, several additional, poorly attested languages are included as being closest to Homa/Ngenda:

- Bali (D20)
- Old Bomokandian
  - Komoic (Biran, incl. Komo)
  - Middle Bomokandian (Lika & Bati–Angba)
  - Ngbele–Ngenda
    - Extreme-north Vestigial-suffix Bantu: Kari, Ngbee, Nyanga-li (Gbati-ri)
    - Ngendan
      - Homa, Ngbinda, ?Boguru, ?Bodo (perhaps instead Lebonya)
