= Menchum =

- Department
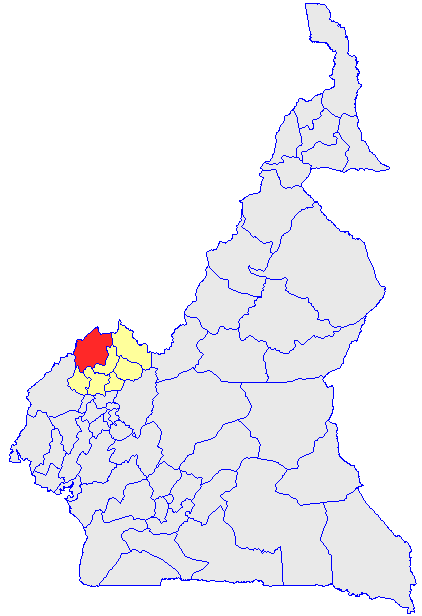
- Department location in Cameroon
- Coordinates: 6.6433°N 10.1397°E
- Country: Cameroon
- Province: Northwest Province
- Capital: Wum

Area
  - Total: 1,725 sq mi (4,469 km^{2})

Population (2005)
  - Total: 161,998
- Time zone: UTC+1 (WAT)

Menchum is a department of Northwest Province in Cameroon. The department covers an area of 4469 km^{2} and as of 2005 had a total population of 161,998. The capital of the department lies at Wum. The Menchum River drains this area, flowing westward into Nigeria to join the Benue River.

== Subdivisions ==
The department is divided administratively into 5 communes and in turn into villages.

=== Communes ===
District	Capital	Area (km^{2})
Menchum Valley	Benakuma	956.5
Furu-Awa	Furu-Awa	1,186
Wum	Wum	302.1
Fungom	Zhoa	2,098
