= Budu language =

Language of the Democratic Republic of the Congo

Budu
- Ɨbʉdhʉ
- Native to: Democratic Republic of the Congo
- Region: Orientale Province
- Ethnicity: Budu
- Native speakers: (180,000 cited 1991)
- Language family: Niger–Congo?: Atlantic–Congo; Benue–Congo; Southern Bantoid; Bantu (Zone D.30); Nyali (Budu–Ndaka); Budu

Language codes
- ISO 639-3: buu
- Glottolog: budu1250
- Guthrie code: D.332

Ɨbʉdhʉ, also called Budu, is a Bantu language spoken by the Budu people in the Wamba Territory in the Orientale Province of the Democratic Republic of the Congo. Its orthography uses the special characters ɨ, ʉ, ɛ and ɔ, as well as modifier letters colon ꞉ and equal sign ꞊ for grammatical tone, marking past and future tense, respectively.

A variety of this language is called Matta and is spoken locally both north and south of Maboma.

== Phonology ==
=== Consonants ===
		Labial	Alveolar	(Alveolo-) palatal	Velar	Labio- velar	Glottal
Plosive	voiceless	p	t	c	k		
Plosive	voiced	b	d	ɟ	ɡ		
Plosive	prenasal	ᵐb	ⁿd	ᶮɟ	ᵑɡ		
Plosive	implosive	ɓ	ɗ	ʄ			
Affricate	voiceless			t͡ɕ		k͡p	
Affricate	voiced			d͡ʑ		ɡ͡b	
Affricate	prenasal			ᶮd͡ʑ		ᵑᵐɡ͡b	
Fricative	voiceless	f	s				h
Fricative	voiced	v	z				h
Fricative	prenasal	ᶬv					
Nasal		m	n	ɲ			
Approximant			(l)	j		w	

- [z] only occurs in the Koya dialect of Budu.
- /h/ can be heard as either a voiced [ɦ] or voiceless [h] among different speakers.
- /ɗ/ can be heard as [l] or a tap [ɾ] in free variation.

=== Vowels ===
	Front	Central	Back
Close	i		u
Near-close	ɪ		ʊ
Close-mid	e		o
Open-mid	ɛ		ɔ
Open		a	
