= ISO 639:b =

List of ISO 639-3 language codes starting with B

This is a list of ISO 639-3 language codes starting with B.

Index | a | b | c | d | e | f | g | h | i | j | k | l | m | n | o | p | q | r | s | t | u | v | w | x | y | z

Abbreviations are used in the table as follows:

- Scope: I = individual language, M = macrolanguage, S = special code
- Type: C = constructed, E = extinct (in recent times), H = historical (distinct from its modern form), L = living, S = special code

Deprecated codes are enclosed in (parentheses).

The column Family contains the generic English name of the language's family or macrolanguage.

| ISO 639 codes | | | Scope/Type | Family | Language names | |
| 639-3 | 639-1 | 639-2/B | Scope/Type | Family | Native | ISO name |
|---|---|---|---|---|---|---|
| baa | | | I/L | Austronesian | | Babatana |
| bab | | | I/L | Niger-Congo | | Bainouk-Gunyuño |
| bac | | | I/L | Austronesian | | Badui |
| bae | | | I/E | Arawakan | | Baré |
| baf | | | I/L | Niger-Congo | | Nubaca |
| bag | | | I/L | Niger-Congo | | Tuki |
| bah | | | I/L | English Creole | | Bahamas Creole English |
| baj | | | I/L | Austronesian | | Barakai |
| bak | ba | bak | I/L | Turkic | башҡорт | Bashkir |
| bal | | bal | M/L | Indo-European | بلوچی | Baluchi |
| bam | bm | bam | I/L | Niger–Congo | bamanankan | Bambara |
| ban | | ban | I/L | Austronesian | Basa Bali | Balinese |
| bao | | | I/L | Tucanoan | | Waimaha |
| bap | | | I/L | Sino-Tibetan | बान्तावा | Bantawa |
| bar | | | I/L | Indo-European | | Bavarian |
| bas | | bas | I/L | Niger-Congo | ɓasaá | Basa (Cameroon) |
| bau | | | I/L | Niger-Congo | | Bada (Nigeria) |
| bav | | | I/L | Niger-Congo | | Vengo |
| baw | | | I/L | Niger-Congo | | Bambili-Bambui |
| bax | | | I/L | Niger-Congo | | Bamun |
| bay | | | I/L | Austronesian | | Batuley |
| (baz) | | | I/L | Niger-Congo | | Tunen |
| bba | | | I/L | Niger-Congo | | Baatonum |
| bbb | | | I/L | Trans-New Guinea | | Barai |
| bbc | | | I/L | Austronesian | | Batak Toba |
| bbd | | | I/L | Trans-New Guinea | | Bau |
| bbe | | | I/L | Niger-Congo | | Bangba |
| bbf | | | I/L | Fas | | Baibai |
| bbg | | | I/L | Niger-Congo | | Barama |
| bbh | | | I/L | Austroasiatic | Pakan | Bugan |
| bbi | | | I/L | Niger-Congo | | Barombi |
| bbj | | | I/L | Niger-Congo | | Ghomálá' |
| bbk | | | I/L | Niger-Congo | | Babanki |
| bbl | | | I/L | Northeast Caucasian | | Bats |
| bbm | | | I/L | Niger-Congo | | Babango |
| bbn | | | I/L | Austronesian | | Uneapa |
| bbo | | | I/L | Niger-Congo | | Konabéré; Northern Bobo Madaré |
| bbp | | | I/L | Niger-Congo | | West Central Banda |
| bbq | | | I/L | Niger-Congo | | Bamali |
| bbr | | | I/L | Trans-New Guinea | | Girawa |
| bbs | | | I/L | Niger-Congo | | Bakpinka |
| bbt | | | I/L | Afro-Asiatic | | Mburku |
| bbu | | | I/L | Niger-Congo | | Kulung (Nigeria) |
| bbv | | | I/L | Austronesian | | Karnai |
| bbw | | | I/L | Niger-Congo | | Baba |
| bbx | | | I/L | Niger-Congo | | Bubia |
| bby | | | I/L | Niger-Congo | | Befang |
| (bbz) | | | I/L | spurious language | | Babalia Creole Arabic |
| bca | | | I/L | Sino-Tibetan | Baip‧ngvp‧zix | Central Bai |
| bcb | | | I/L | Niger-Congo | | Bainouk-Samik |
| bcc | | | I/L | Indo-European | بلوچی | Southern Balochi |
| bcd | | | I/L | Austronesian | | North Babar |
| bce | | | I/L | Niger-Congo | | Bamenyam |
| bcf | | | I/L | Kiwaian | | Bamu |
| bcg | | | I/L | Niger-Congo | | Baga Pokur |
| bch | | | I/L | Austronesian | | Bariai |
| bci | | | I/L | Niger-Congo | | Baoulé |
| bcj | | | I/L | Nyulnyulan | | Bardi |
| bck | | | I/L | Bunuban | | Bunuba |
| bcl | | | I/L | Austronesian | | Central Bikol |
| bcm | | | I/L | Austronesian | | Bannoni |
| bcn | | | I/L | Niger-Congo | | Bali (Nigeria) |
| bco | | | I/L | Trans-New Guinea | | Kaluli |
| bcp | | | I/L | Niger-Congo | | Bali (Democratic Republic of Congo) |
| bcq | | | I/L | Afro-Asiatic | | Bench |
| bcr | | | I/L | Na-Dené | Witsuwit'en | Babine |
| bcs | | | I/L | Niger-Congo | | Kohumono |
| bct | | | I/L | Nilo-Saharan | | Bendi |
| bcu | | | I/L | Austronesian | | Awad Bing |
| bcv | | | I/L | Niger-Congo | | Shoo-Minda-Nye |
| bcw | | | I/L | Afro-Asiatic | | Bana |
| (bcx) | | | I/L | Austronesian | | Pamona |
| bcy | | | I/L | Afro-Asiatic | | Bacama |
| bcz | | | I/L | Niger-Congo | | Bainouk-Gunyaamolo |
| bda | | | I/L | Niger–Congo? | | Bayot |
| bdb | | | I/L | Austronesian | | Basap |
| bdc | | | I/L | Chocoan | | Emberá-Baudó |
| bdd | | | I/L | Austronesian | | Bunama |
| bde | | | I/L | Afro-Asiatic | | Bade |
| bdf | | | I/L | Trans-New Guinea | | Biage |
| bdg | | | I/L | Austronesian | | Bonggi |
| bdh | | | I/L | Nilo-Saharan | | Baka (South Sudan) |
| bdi | | | I/L | Nilo-Saharan | | Burun |
| bdj | | | I/L | Niger-Congo | Bairt⤧ngvrt⤧zix | Bai; Bai (South Sudan) |
| bdk | | | I/L | Northeast Caucasian | | Budukh |
| bdl | | | I/L | Austronesian | | Indonesian Bajau |
| bdm | | | I/L | Afro-Asiatic | | Buduma |
| bdn | | | I/L | Afro-Asiatic | | Baldemu |
| bdo | | | I/L | Nilo-Saharan | | Morom |
| bdp | | | I/L | Niger-Congo | | Bende |
| bdq | | | I/L | Austroasiatic | | Bahnar |
| bdr | | | I/L | Austronesian | | West Coast Bajau |
| bds | | | I/L | Afro-Asiatic | | Burunge |
| bdt | | | I/L | Niger-Congo | | Bokoto |
| bdu | | | I/L | Niger-Congo | | Oroko |
| bdv | | | I/L | Indo-European | | Bodo Parja |
| bdw | | | I/L | Trans-New Guinea | | Baham |
| bdx | | | I/L | Austronesian | | Budong-Budong |
| bdy | | | I/L | Pama-Nyungan | | Bandjalang |
| bdz | | | I/L | Indo-European | | Badeshi |
| bea | | | I/L | Na-Dené | Dunne-za | Beaver |
| beb | | | I/L | Niger-Congo | | Bebele |
| bec | | | I/L | Niger-Congo | | Iceve-Maci |
| bed | | | I/L | Austronesian | | Bedoanas |
| bee | | | I/L | Sino-Tibetan | | Byangsi |
| bef | | | I/L | Trans-New Guinea | | Benabena |
| beg | | | I/L | Austronesian | | Belait |
| beh | | | I/L | Niger-Congo | | Biali |
| bei | | | I/L | Austronesian | | Bekati' |
| bej | | bej | I/L | Afro-Asiatic | بداوية | Bedawiyet; Beja |
| bek | | | I/L | Austronesian | | Bebeli |
| bel | be | bel | I/L | Indo-European | беларуская | Belarusian |
| bem | | bem | I/L | Niger-Congo | ichibemba | Bemba (Zambia) |
| ben | bn | ben | I/L | Indo-European | বাংলা | Bengali |
| beo | | | I/L | Trans-New Guinea | | Beami |
| bep | | | I/L | Austronesian | | Besoa |
| beq | | | I/L | Niger-Congo | | Beembe |
| bes | | | I/L | Niger-Congo | | Besme |
| bet | | | I/L | Niger-Congo | | Guiberoua Béte |
| beu | | | I/L | Timor-Alor-Pantar | | Blagar |
| bev | | | I/L | Niger-Congo | | Daloa Bété |
| bew | | | I/L | Malay-based Creole | Bahasa Betawi | Betawi |
| bex | | | I/L | Nilo-Saharan | | Jur Modo |
| bey | | | I/L | Torricelli | | Beli (Papua New Guinea) |
| bez | | | I/L | Niger-Congo | | Bena (Tanzania) |
| bfa | | | I/L | Nilo-Saharan | | Bari |
| bfb | | | I/L | Indo-European | | Pauri Bareli |
| bfc | | | I/L | Sino-Tibetan | Baip‧ngvp‧zix | Northern Bai; Panyi Bai |
| bfd | | | I/L | Niger-Congo | | Bafut |
| bfe | | | I/L | Foja Range | | Betaf; Tena |
| bff | | | I/L | Niger-Congo | | Bofi |
| bfg | | | I/L | Austronesian | | Busang Kayan |
| bfh | | | I/L | Yam | | Blafe |
| bfi | | | I/L | BANZSL | | British Sign Language |
| bfj | | | I/L | Niger-Congo | | Bafanji |
| bfk | | | I/L | village sign language | | Ban Khor Sign Language |
| bfl | | | I/L | Niger-Congo | | Banda-Ndélé |
| bfm | | | I/L | Niger-Congo | | Mmen |
| bfn | | | I/L | Trans-New Guinea | | Bunak |
| bfo | | | I/L | Niger-Congo | | Malba Birifor |
| bfp | | | I/L | Niger-Congo | | Beba |
| bfq | | | I/L | Dravidian | ಬಡಗ | Badaga |
| bfr | | | I/L | Indo-European | | Bazigar |
| bfs | | | I/L | Sino-Tibetan | Baip‧ngvp‧zix | Southern Bai |
| bft | | | I/L | Sino-Tibetan | بلتی | Balti |
| bfu | | | I/L | Sino-Tibetan | | Gahri |
| bfw | | | I/L | Austroasiatic | | Bondo |
| bfx | | | I/L | Austronesian | | Bantayanon |
| bfy | | | I/L | Indo-European | | Bagheli |
| bfz | | | I/L | Indo-European | | Mahasu Pahari |
| bga | | | I/L | Niger-Congo | | Gwamhi-Wuri |
| bgb | | | I/L | Austronesian | | Bobongko |
| bgc | | | I/L | Indo-European | | Haryanvi |
| bgd | | | I/L | Indo-European | | Rathwi Bareli |
| bge | | | I/L | Indo-European | | Bauria |
| bgf | | | I/L | Niger-Congo | | Bangandu |
| bgg | | | I/L | Sino-Tibetan | Khowa | Bugun |
| (bgh) | | | I/L | | | Bogan |
| bgi | | | I/L | Austronesian | | Giangan |
| bgj | | | I/L | Niger-Congo | | Bangolan |
| bgk | | | I/L | Austroasiatic | | Bit; Buxinhua |
| bgl | | | I/L | Austroasiatic | | Bo (Laos) |
| (bgm) | | | I/L | Niger-Congo | | Baga Mboteni |
| bgn | | | I/L | Indo-European | | Western Balochi |
| bgo | | | I/L | Niger–Congo? | | Baga Koga |
| bgp | | | I/L | Indo-European | | Eastern Balochi |
| bgq | | | I/L | Indo-European | | Bagri |
| bgr | | | I/L | Sino-Tibetan | | Bawm Chin |
| bgs | | | I/L | Austronesian | | Tagabawa |
| bgt | | | I/L | Austronesian | | Bughotu |
| bgu | | | I/L | Niger-Congo | | Mbongno |
| bgv | | | I/L | Trans-New Guinea | | Warkay-Bipim |
| bgw | | | I/L | Indo-European | | Bhatri |
| bgx | | | I/L | Turkic | | Balkan Gagauz Turkish |
| bgy | | | I/L | Austronesian | | Benggoi |
| bgz | | | I/L | Austronesian | | Banggai |
| bha | | | I/L | Indo-European | | Bharia |
| bhb | | | I/L | Indo-European | भीली | Bhili |
| bhc | | | I/L | Austronesian | | Biga |
| bhd | | | I/L | Indo-European | | Bhadrawahi |
| bhe | | | I/L | Indo-European | | Bhaya |
| bhf | | | I/L | Senu River | | Odiai |
| bhg | | | I/L | Trans-New Guinea | | Binandere |
| bhh | | | I/L | Indo-European | | Bukharic |
| bhi | | | I/L | Indo-European | | Bhilali |
| bhj | | | I/L | Sino-Tibetan | | Bahing |
| (bhk) | | | I/L | Austronesian | | Albay Bicolano |
| bhl | | | I/L | Trans-New Guinea | | Bimin |
| bhm | | | I/L | Afro-Asiatic | | Bathari |
| bhn | | | I/L | Afro-Asiatic | | Bohtan Neo-Aramaic |
| bho | | bho | I/L | Indo-European | भोजपुरी | Bhojpuri |
| bhp | | | I/L | Austronesian | | Bima |
| bhq | | | I/L | Austronesian | | Tukang Besi South |
| bhr | | | I/L | Austronesian | | Bara Malagasy |
| bhs | | | I/L | Afro-Asiatic | | Buwal |
| bht | | | I/L | Indo-European | | Bhattiyali |
| bhu | | | I/L | Indo-European | | Bhunjia |
| bhv | | | I/L | Austronesian | | Bahau |
| bhw | | | I/L | Austronesian | | Biak |
| bhx | | | I/L | spurious | | Bhalay |
| bhy | | | I/L | Niger-Congo | | Bhele |
| bhz | | | I/L | Austronesian | | Bada (Indonesia) |
| bia | | | I/L | Pama-Nyungan | | Badimaya |
| bib | | | I/L | Niger-Congo | | Bisa; Bissa |
| (bic) | | | I/L | spurious language | | Bikaru |
| bid | | | I/L | Afro-Asiatic | | Bidiyo |
| bie | | | I/L | Madang | | Bepour |
| bif | | | I/L | Niger-Congo | | Biafada |
| big | | | I/L | Trans-New Guinea | | Biangai |
| (bii) | | | I/L | Sino-Tibetan | | Bisu |
| (bij) | | | I/L | Niger-Congo | | Vaghat-Ya-Bijim-Legeri |
| bik | | bik | M/L | Austronesian | Bicol | Bikol |
| bil | | | I/L | Niger-Congo | | Bile |
| bim | | | I/L | Niger-Congo | | Bimoba |
| bin | | bin | I/L | Niger-Congo | Èdó | Bini; Edo |
| bio | | | I/L | Senu River | | Nai |
| bip | | | I/L | Niger-Congo | | Bila |
| biq | | | I/L | Austronesian | | Bipi |
| bir | | | I/L | Engan | | Bisorio |
| bis | bi | bis | I/L | English Creole | Bislama | Bislama |
| bit | | | I/L | Sepik | | Berinomo |
| biu | | | I/L | Sino-Tibetan | | Biete |
| biv | | | I/L | Niger-Congo | | Southern Birifor |
| biw | | | I/L | Niger-Congo | | Kol (Cameroon) |
| bix | | | I/L | Austroasiatic | | Bijori |
| biy | | | I/L | Austroasiatic | | Birhor |
| biz | | | I/L | Niger-Congo | | Baloi |
| bja | | | I/L | Niger-Congo | | Budza |
| bjb | | | I/E | Pama-Nyungan | | Banggarla |
| bjc | | | I/L | Trans-New Guinea | | Bariji |
| (bjd) | | | I/L | Pama-Nyungan | | Bandjigali |
| bje | | | I/L | Hmong-Mien | | Biao-Jiao Mien |
| bjf | | | I/L | Afro-Asiatic | | Barzani Jewish Neo-Aramaic |
| bjg | | | I/L | Niger-Congo | | Bidyogo |
| bjh | | | I/L | Sepik | | Bahinemo |
| bji | | | I/L | Afro-Asiatic | | Burji |
| bjj | | | I/L | Indo-European | | Kanauji |
| bjk | | | I/L | Austronesian | | Barok |
| bjl | | | I/L | Austronesian | | Bulu (Papua New Guinea) |
| bjm | | | I/L | Indo-European | | Bajelani |
| bjn | | | I/L | Austronesian | | Banjar |
| bjo | | | I/L | Niger-Congo | | Mid-Southern Banda |
| bjp | | | I/L | Austronesian | | Fanamaket |
| (bjq) | | | I/L | Austronesian | | Southern Betsimisaraka Malagasy |
| bjr | | | I/L | Trans-New Guinea | | Binumarien |
| bjs | | | I/L | English Creole | | Bajan |
| bjt | | | I/L | Niger-Congo | | Balanta-Ganja |
| bju | | | I/L | Niger-Congo | | Busuu |
| bjv | | | I/L | Nilo-Saharan | | Bedjond |
| bjw | | | I/L | Niger-Congo | | Bakwé |
| bjx | | | I/L | Austronesian | | Banao Itneg |
| bjy | | | I/E | Pama-Nyungan | | Bayali |
| bjz | | | I/L | Trans-New Guinea | | Baruga |
| bka | | | I/L | Niger-Congo | | Kyak |
| (bkb) | | | I/L | Austronesian | | Finallig |
| bkc | | | I/L | Niger-Congo | | Baka (Cameroon) |
| bkd | | | I/L | Austronesian | | Binukid; Talaandig |
| (bke) | | | I/L | Austronesian | | Bengkulu |
| bkf | | | I/L | Niger-Congo | | Beeke |
| bkg | | | I/L | Niger-Congo | | Buraka |
| bkh | | | I/L | Niger-Congo | | Bakoko |
| bki | | | I/L | Austronesian | | Baki |
| bkj | | | I/L | Niger-Congo | | Pande |
| bkk | | | I/L | Indo-European | | Brokskat |
| bkl | | | I/L | Foja Range | | Berik |
| bkm | | | I/L | Niger-Congo | | Kom (Cameroon) |
| bkn | | | I/L | Austronesian | | Bukitan |
| bko | | | I/L | Niger-Congo | | Kwa' |
| bkp | | | I/L | Niger-Congo | | Boko (Democratic Republic of Congo) |
| bkq | | | I/L | Cariban | | Bakairí |
| bkr | | | I/L | Austronesian | | Bakumpai |
| bks | | | I/L | Austronesian | | Northern Sorsoganon |
| bkt | | | I/L | Niger-Congo | | Boloki |
| bku | | | I/L | Austronesian | | Buhid |
| bkv | | | I/L | Niger-Congo | | Bekwarra |
| bkw | | | I/L | Niger-Congo | | Bekwel |
| bkx | | | I/L | Austronesian | | Baikeno |
| bky | | | I/L | Niger-Congo | | Bokyi |
| bkz | | | I/L | Austronesian | | Bungku |
| bla | | bla | I/L | Algic | | Siksika |
| blb | | | I/L | Central Solomon | | Bilua |
| blc | | | I/L | Salishan | | Bella Coola |
| bld | | | I/L | Austronesian | | Bolango |
| ble | | | I/L | Niger-Congo | | Balanta-Kentohe |
| blf | | | I/L | Austronesian | | Buol |
| (blg) | | | I/L | Austronesian | | Balau |
| blh | | | I/L | Niger-Congo | | Kuwaa |
| bli | | | I/L | Niger-Congo | | Bolia |
| blj | | | I/L | Austronesian | | Bolongan |
| blk | | | I/L | Sino-Tibetan | | Pa'O; Pa'o Karen |
| bll | | | I/E | Siouan-Catawban | | Biloxi |
| blm | | | I/L | Nilo-Saharan | | Beli (South Sudan) |
| bln | | | I/L | Austronesian | | Southern Catanduanes Bikol |
| blo | | | I/L | Niger-Congo | | Anii |
| blp | | | I/L | Austronesian | | Blablanga |
| blq | | | I/L | Austronesian | | Baluan-Pam |
| blr | | | I/L | Austroasiatic | | Blang |
| bls | | | I/L | Austronesian | | Balaesang |
| blt | | | I/L | Kra-Dai | | Tai Dam |
| (blu) | | | I/L | Hmong-Mien | | Hmong Njua |
| blv | | | I/L | Niger-Congo | | Bolo; Kibala |
| blw | | | I/L | Austronesian | | Balangao |
| blx | | | I/L | Austronesian | | Mag-Indi Ayta |
| bly | | | I/L | Niger-Congo | | Notre |
| blz | | | I/L | Austronesian | | Balantak |
| bma | | | I/L | Niger-Congo | | Lame |
| bmb | | | I/L | Niger-Congo | | Bembe |
| bmc | | | I/L | Austronesian | | Biem |
| bmd | | | I/L | Niger–Congo? | | Baga Manduri |
| bme | | | I/L | Niger-Congo | | Limassa |
| bmf | | | I/L | Niger-Congo | | Bom-Kim |
| bmg | | | I/L | Niger-Congo | | Bamwe |
| bmh | | | I/L | Trans-New Guinea | | Kein |
| bmi | | | I/L | Nilo-Saharan | | Bagirmi |
| bmj | | | I/L | Indo-European | | Bote-Majhi |
| bmk | | | I/L | Austronesian | | Ghayavi |
| bml | | | I/L | Niger-Congo | | Bomboli |
| bmm | | | I/L | Austronesian | | Northern Betsimisaraka Malagasy |
| bmn | | | I/E | Austronesian | | Bina (Papua New Guinea) |
| bmo | | | I/L | Niger-Congo | | Bambalang |
| bmp | | | I/L | Trans-New Guinea | | Bulgebi |
| bmq | | | I/L | Niger-Congo | | Bomu |
| bmr | | | I/L | Boran | | Muinane |
| bms | | | I/L | Nilo-Saharan | | Bilma Kanuri |
| bmt | | | I/L | Hmong-Mien | | Biao Mon |
| bmu | | | I/L | Trans-New Guinea | | Somba-Siawari |
| bmv | | | I/L | Niger-Congo | | Bum |
| bmw | | | I/L | Niger-Congo | | Bomwali |
| bmx | | | I/L | Trans-New Guinea | | Baimak |
| (bmy) | | | I/L | spurious language | | Bemba (Democratic Republic of Congo) |
| bmz | | | I/L | Trans-New Guinea | | Baramu |
| bna | | | I/L | Austronesian | | Bonerate |
| bnb | | | I/L | Austronesian | | Bookan |
| bnc | | | M/L | Austronesian | | Bontok |
| bnd | | | I/L | Austronesian | | Banda (Indonesia) |
| bne | | | I/L | Austronesian | | Bintauna |
| bnf | | | I/L | Austronesian | | Masiwang |
| bng | | | I/L | Niger-Congo | | Benga |
| (bnh) | | | I/L | | | Banawá |
| bni | | | I/L | Niger-Congo | | Bangi |
| bnj | | | I/L | Austronesian | | Eastern Tawbuid |
| bnk | | | I/L | Austronesian | | Bierebo |
| bnl | | | I/L | Afro-Asiatic | | Boon |
| bnm | | | I/L | Niger-Congo | | Batanga |
| bnn | | | I/L | Austronesian | | Bunun |
| bno | | | I/L | Austronesian | | Bantoanon |
| bnp | | | I/L | Austronesian | | Bola |
| bnq | | | I/L | Austronesian | | Bantik |
| bnr | | | I/L | Austronesian | | Butmas-Tur |
| bns | | | I/L | Indo-European | | Bundeli |
| bnu | | | I/L | Austronesian | | Bentong |
| bnv | | | I/L | Foja Range | | Beneraf, Bonerif, Edwas |
| bnw | | | I/L | Sepik | | Bisis |
| bnx | | | I/L | Niger-Congo | | Bangubangu |
| bny | | | I/L | Austronesian | | Bintulu |
| bnz | | | I/L | Niger-Congo | | Beezen |
| boa | | | I/L | Boran | | Bora |
| bob | | | I/L | Afro-Asiatic | Boni | Aweer |
| (boc) | | | I/L | Austronesian | | Bakung Kenyah |
| bod | bo | tib | I/L | Sino-Tibetan | བོད་སྐད་ | Tibetan |
| boe | | | I/L | Niger-Congo? | Ji | Mundabli-Mufu |
| bof | | | I/L | Niger-Congo | | Bolon |
| bog | | | I/L | Deaf-community sign language | | Bamako Sign Language |
| boh | | | I/L | Niger–Congo? | Kiboma | Boma |
| boi | | | I/E | Chumashan | | Barbareño |
| boj | | | I/L | Trans-New Guinea | | Anjam |
| bok | | | I/L | Niger-Congo | | Bonjo |
| bol | | | I/L | Afro-Asiatic | | Bole |
| bom | | | I/L | Niger-Congo | | Berom |
| bon | | | I/L | Trans-Fly | | Bine |
| boo | | | I/L | Mande | | Tiemacèwè Bozo |
| bop | | | I/L | Trans-New Guinea | | Bonkiman |
| boq | | | I/L | Trans-New Guinea | | Bogaya |
| bor | | | I/L | Macro-Jê | | Borôro |
| bos | bs | bos | I/L | Indo-European | bosanski | Bosnian |
| bot | | | I/L | Nilo-Saharan | | Bongo |
| bou | | | I/L | Niger-Congo | | Bondei |
| bov | | | I/L | Niger-Congo | | Tuwuli |
| bow | | | I/E | Trans-Fly | | Rema |
| box | | | I/L | Niger-Congo | | Buamu |
| boy | | | I/L | Niger-Congo | | Bodo (Central African Republic) |
| boz | | | I/L | Mande | | Tiéyaxo Bozo |
| bpa | | | I/L | Austronesian | | Daakaka |
| (bpb) | | | I/E | spurious language | | Barbacoas |
| bpc | | | I/L | Niger–Congo? | Mboko | Mbuk |
| bpd | | | I/L | Atlantic–Congo | | Banda-Banda |
| bpe | | | I/L | Skou | | Bauni |
| bpg | | | I/L | Austronesian | | Bonggo |
| bph | | | I/L | Northeast Caucasian | | Botlikh |
| bpi | | | I/L | Trans-New Guinea | | Bagupi |
| bpj | | | I/L | Atlantic–Congo | | Binji |
| bpk | | | I/L | Austronesian | | 'Ôrôê; Orowe |
| bpl | | | I/L | Malay-based Creole | | Broome Pearling Lugger Pidgin |
| bpm | | | I/L | Trans-New Guinea | | Biyom |
| bpn | | | I/L | Hmong–Mien | Ba Pai | Dzao Min |
| bpo | | | I/L | East Geelvink Bay? | | Anasi |
| bpp | | | I/L | Kaure-Kosare | | Kaure |
| bpq | | | I/L | Malay-based Creole | | Banda Malay |
| bpr | | | I/L | Austronesian | | Koronadal Blaan |
| bps | | | I/L | Austronesian | | Sarangani Blaan |
| bpt | | | I/E | Pama-Nyungan | | Barrow Point |
| bpu | | | I/L | Madang | | Bongu |
| bpv | | | I/L | Anim | | Bian Marind |
| bpw | | | I/L | Left May? | | Bo (Papua New Guinea) |
| bpx | | | I/L | Indo-European | | Palya Bareli |
| bpy | | | I/L | Indo-European | বিষ্ণুপ্রিয়া মণিপুরী | Bishnupriya |
| bpz | | | I/L | Austronesian | | Bilba |
| bqa | | | I/L | Atlantic–Congo | | Tchumbuli |
| bqb | | | I/L | Foja Range | | Bagusa |
| bqc | | | I/L | Niger-Congo | | Boko (Benin); Boo |
| bqd | | | I/L | Niger–Congo? | | Bung |
| (bqe) | | | I/L | Basque (isolate) | | Navarro-Labourdin Basque |
| bqf | | | I/E | Niger–Congo? | | Baga Kaloum |
| bqg | | | I/L | Atlantic–Congo | | Bago-Kusuntu |
| bqh | | | I/L | Sino-Tibetan | | Baima |
| bqi | | | I/L | Indo-European | | Bakhtiari |
| bqj | | | I/L | Atlantic–Congo | | Bandial |
| bqk | | | I/L | Atlantic–Congo | | Banda-Mbrès |
| bql | | | I/L | Trans–New Guinea? | Bilakura | Karian; Bilakura |
| bqm | | | I/L | Atlantic–Congo | | Wumboko |
| bqn | | | I/L | Sign language (Francosign) | | Bulgarian Sign Language |
| bqo | | | I/L | Atlantic–Congo | | Balo |
| bqp | | | I/L | Mande | | Busa |
| bqq | | | I/L | Lakes Plain | | Biritai |
| bqr | | | I/L | Austronesian | | Burusu |
| bqs | | | I/L | Ramu | | Bosngun |
| bqt | | | I/L | Atlantic–Congo | | Bamukumbit |
| bqu | | | I/L | Atlantic–Congo | | Boguru |
| bqv | | | I/L | Atlantic–Congo | | Begbere-Ejar; Koro Wachi |
| bqw | | | I/L | Atlantic–Congo | | Buru (Nigeria) |
| bqx | | | I/L | Benue-Congo | | Baangi |
| bqy | | | I/L | village sign language | | Bengkala Sign Language |
| bqz | | | I/L | Atlantic–Congo | | Bakaka |
| bra | | bra | I/L | Indo-European | | Braj |
| brb | | | I/L | Austroasiatic | | Brao; Lave |
| brc | | | I/E | Dutch Creole | | Berbice Creole Dutch |
| brd | | | I/L | Sino-Tibetan | Baraamu | Baraamu |
| bre | br | bre | I/L | Indo-European | brezhoneg | Breton |
| brf | | | I/L | Atlantic–Congo | | Bira |
| brg | | | I/L | Arawakan | | Baure |
| brh | | | I/L | Dravidian | | Brahui |
| bri | | | I/L | Atlantic–Congo | | Mokpwe |
| brj | | | I/L | Austronesian | | Bieria |
| brk | | | I/E | Eastern Sudanic | | Birked |
| brl | | | I/L | Atlantic–Congo | | Birwa |
| brm | | | I/L | Zande | | Barambu |
| brn | | | I/L | Chibchan | | Boruca |
| bro | | | I/L | Sino-Tibetan | | Brokkat |
| brp | | | I/L | East Geelvink Bay | | Barapasi |
| brq | | | I/L | Ramu | | Breri |
| brr | | | I/L | Austronesian | | Birao |
| brs | | | I/L | Austronesian | | Baras |
| brt | | | I/L | Atlantic–Congo | | Bitare |
| bru | | | I/L | Austroasiatic | | Eastern Bru |
| brv | | | I/L | Austroasiatic | | Western Bru |
| brw | | | I/L | Dravidian | | Bellari |
| brx | | | I/L | Sino-Tibetan | | Bodo (India) |
| bry | | | I/L | Sepik | | Burui |
| brz | | | I/L | Austronesian | | Bilbil |
| bsa | | | I/L | Language isolate | | Abinomn |
| bsb | | | I/L | Austronesian | | Brunei Bisaya |
| bsc | | | I/L | Atlantic–Congo | | Bassari; Oniyan |
| (bsd) | | | I/L | Austronesian | | Sarawak Bisaya |
| bse | | | I/L | Atlantic–Congo | | Wushi |
| bsf | | | I/L | Atlantic–Congo | | Bauchi |
| bsg | | | I/L | Indo-European | | Bashkardi |
| bsh | | | I/L | Indo-European | | Kati |
| bsi | | | I/L | Atlantic–Congo | | Bassossi |
| bsj | | | I/L | Atlantic–Congo | | Bangwinji |
| bsk | | | I/L | Language isolate | | Burushaski |
| bsl | | | I/E | Atlantic–Congo | | Basa-Gumna |
| bsm | | | I/L | Austronesian | | Busami |
| bsn | | | I/L | Tucanoan | Jãnerã - Eduria Oca | Barasana-Eduria |
| bso | | | I/L | Afro-Asiatic | | Buso |
| bsp | | | I/L | Niger–Congo? | | Baga Sitemu |
| bsq | | | I/L | Atlantic–Congo | | Bassa |
| bsr | | | I/L | Atlantic–Congo | | Bassa-Kontagora |
| bss | | | I/L | Atlantic–Congo | | Akoose |
| bst | | | I/L | Afro-Asiatic | | Basketo |
| bsu | | | I/L | Austronesian | | Bahonsuai |
| bsv | | | I/E | Niger–Congo? | | Baga Sobané |
| bsw | | | I/L | Afro-Asiatic | | Baiso |
| bsx | | | I/L | Atlantic–Congo | | Yangkam |
| bsy | | | I/L | Austronesian | | Sabah Bisaya |
| (bsz) | | | I/L | Basque (isolate) | | Souletin Basque |
| bta | | | I/L | Afro-Asiatic | | Bata |
| (btb) | | | I/L | spurious language | | Beti (Cameroon) |
| btc | | | I/L | Atlantic–Congo | | Bati (Cameroon) |
| btd | | | I/L | Austronesian | | Batak Dairi |
| bte | | | I/E | Atlantic–Congo | | Gamo-Ningi |
| btf | | | I/L | Afro-Asiatic | | Birgit |
| btg | | | I/L | Atlantic–Congo | | Gagnoa Bété |
| bth | | | I/L | Austronesian | | Biatah Bidayuh |
| bti | | | I/L | East Geelvink Bay | | Burate |
| btj | | | I/L | Austronesian | | Bacanese Malay |
| (btl) | | | I/L | spurious language | | Bhatola |
| btm | | | I/L | Austronesian | | Batak Mandailing |
| btn | | | I/L | Austronesian | | Ratagnon |
| bto | | | I/L | Austronesian | | Rinconada Bikol |
| btp | | | I/L | Austronesian | | Budibud |
| btq | | | I/L | Austroasiatic | | Batek |
| btr | | | I/L | Austronesian | | Baetora |
| bts | | | I/L | Austronesian | | Batak Simalungun |
| btt | | | I/L | Atlantic–Congo | | Bete-Bendi |
| btu | | | I/L | Atlantic–Congo | | Batu |
| btv | | | I/L | Indo-European | | Bateri |
| btw | | | I/L | Austronesian | | Butuanon |
| btx | | | I/L | Austronesian | | Batak Karo |
| bty | | | I/L | Austronesian | | Bobot |
| btz | | | I/L | Austronesian | | Batak Alas-Kluet |
| bua | | bua | M/L | Mongolic | буряад | Buriat |
| bub | | | I/L | Atlantic–Congo | | Bua |
| buc | | | I/L | Austronesian | | Bushi |
| bud | | | I/L | Atlantic–Congo | | Ntcham |
| bue | | | I/E | unclassified / Algonquian? | | Beothuk |
| buf | | | I/L | Atlantic–Congo | | Bushoong |
| bug | | bug | I/L | Austronesian | ᨅᨔ ᨕᨘᨁᨗ | Buginese |
| buh | | | I/L | Hmong–Mien | | Younuo Bunu |
| bui | | | I/L | Atlantic–Congo | | Bongili |
| buj | | | I/L | Atlantic–Congo | | Basa-Gurmana |
| buk | | | I/L | Austronesian | | Bugawac |
| bul | bg | bul | I/L | Indo-European | български | Bulgarian |
| bum | | | I/L | Atlantic–Congo | | Bulu (Cameroon) |
| bun | | | I/L | Atlantic–Congo | | Sherbro |
| buo | | | I/L | South Bougainville | | Terei |
| bup | | | I/L | Austronesian | | Busoa |
| buq | | | I/L | Madang | | Brem |
| bus | | | I/L | Mande | | Bokobaru |
| but | | | I/L | Torricelli | | Bungain |
| buu | | | I/L | Atlantic–Congo | | Budu |
| buv | | | I/L | Yuat | | Bun |
| buw | | | I/L | Atlantic–Congo | | Bubi |
| bux | | | I/L | Afro-Asiatic | | Boghom |
| buy | | | I/L | Atlantic–Congo | | Bullom So |
| buz | | | I/L | Atlantic–Congo | | Bukwen |
| bva | | | I/L | Afro-Asiatic | | Barein |
| bvb | | | I/L | Atlantic–Congo | | Bube |
| bvc | | | I/L | Austronesian | | Baelelea |
| bvd | | | I/L | Austronesian | | Baeggu |
| bve | | | I/L | Austronesian | | Berau Malay |
| bvf | | | I/L | Afro-Asiatic | | Boor |
| bvg | | | I/L | Atlantic–Congo | | Bonkeng |
| bvh | | | I/L | Afro-Asiatic | | Bure |
| bvi | | | I/L | Atlantic–Congo | | Belanda Viri |
| bvj | | | I/L | Atlantic–Congo | | Baan |
| bvk | | | I/L | Austronesian | | Bukat |
| bvl | | | I/L | Sign language (French Sign) | | Bolivian Sign Language |
| bvm | | | I/L | Atlantic–Congo | | Bamunka |
| bvn | | | I/L | Torricelli | | Buna |
| bvo | | | I/L | Atlantic–Congo | | Bolgo |
| bvp | | | I/L | Austroasiatic | | Bumang |
| bvq | | | I/L | Central Sudanic | | Birri |
| bvr | | | I/L | Maningrida | | Burarra |
| (bvs) | | | I/L | | | Belgian Sign Language |
| bvt | | | I/L | Austronesian | | Bati (Indonesia) |
| bvu | | | I/L | Austronesian | | Bukit Malay |
| bvv | | | I/E | Arawakan | | Baniva |
| bvw | | | I/L | Afro-Asiatic | | Boga |
| bvx | | | I/L | Atlantic–Congo | | Dibole |
| bvy | | | I/L | Austronesian | | Baybayanon |
| bvz | | | I/L | East Geelvink Bay | | Bauzi |
| bwa | | | I/L | Austronesian | | Bwatoo |
| bwb | | | I/L | Austronesian | | Namosi-Naitasiri-Serua |
| bwc | | | I/L | Atlantic–Congo | | Bwile |
| bwd | | | I/L | Austronesian | | Bwaidoka |
| bwe | | | I/L | Sino-Tibetan | | Bwe Karen |
| bwf | | | I/L | Austronesian | | Boselewa |
| bwg | | | I/L | Atlantic–Congo | | Barwe |
| bwh | | | I/L | Atlantic–Congo | | Bishuo |
| bwi | | | I/L | Arawakan | | Baniwa |
| bwj | | | I/L | Atlantic–Congo | | Láá Láá Bwamu |
| bwk | | | I/L | Trans–New Guinea | | Bauwaki |
| bwl | | | I/L | Atlantic–Congo | | Bwela |
| bwm | | | I/L | Yuat | | Biwat |
| bwn | | | I/L | Hmong–Mien | | Wunai Bunu |
| bwo | | | I/L | Afro-Asiatic | | Borna (Ethiopia); Boro (Ethiopia) |
| bwp | | | I/L | Trans–New Guinea | | Mandobo Bawah |
| bwq | | | I/L | Mande | | Southern Bobo Madaré |
| bwr | | | I/L | Afro-Asiatic | | Bura-Pabir |
| bws | | | I/L | Atlantic–Congo | | Bomboma |
| bwt | | | I/L | Atlantic–Congo | | Bafaw-Balong |
| bwu | | | I/L | Atlantic–Congo | | Buli (Ghana) |
| (bwv) | | | I/L | spurious language | | Bahau River Kenyah |
| bww | | | I/L | Atlantic–Congo | | Bwa |
| bwx | | | I/L | Hmong–Mien | | Bu-Nao Bunu |
| bwy | | | I/L | Atlantic–Congo | | Cwi Bwamu |
| bwz | | | I/L | Atlantic–Congo | | Bwisi |
| bxa | | | I/L | Austronesian | | Tairaha |
| bxb | | | I/L | Nilotic | | Belanda Bor |
| bxc | | | I/L | Atlantic–Congo | | Molengue |
| bxd | | | I/L | Sino-Tibetan | | Pela |
| bxe | | | I/L | unclassified, probably isolate | Birale | Birale |
| bxf | | | I/L | Austronesian | | Bilur; Minigir |
| bxg | | | I/L | Atlantic–Congo | | Bangala |
| bxh | | | I/L | Austronesian | | Buhutu |
| bxi | | | I/E | Pama–Nyungan | | Pirlatapa |
| bxj | | | I/L | Pama–Nyungan | | Bayungu |
| bxk | | | I/L | Atlantic–Congo | | Bukusu; Lubukusu |
| bxl | | | I/L | Mande | | Jalkunan |
| bxm | | | I/L | Mongolic | | Mongolia Buriat |
| bxn | | | I/L | Pama–Nyungan | | Burduna |
| bxo | | | I/L | Hausa-based pidgin | | Barikanchi |
| bxp | | | I/L | Atlantic–Congo | | Bebil |
| bxq | | | I/L | Afro-Asiatic | | Beele |
| bxr | | | I/L | Mongolic | | Russia Buriat |
| bxs | | | I/L | Atlantic–Congo | | Busam |
| (bxt) | | | I/L | Austroasiatic | | Buxinhua |
| bxu | | | I/L | Mongolic | | China Buriat |
| bxv | | | I/L | Central Sudanic | | Berakou |
| bxw | | | I/L | Mande | | Bankagooma |
| (bxx) | | | I/L | spurious language | | Borna (Democratic Republic of Congo) |
| bxz | | | I/L | Trans–New Guinea | | Binahari |
| bya | | | I/L | Austronesian | | Batak |
| byb | | | I/L | Atlantic–Congo | | Bikya |
| byc | | | I/L | Atlantic–Congo | | Ubaghara |
| byd | | | I/L | Austronesian | | Benyadu' |
| bye | | | I/L | Sepik | | Pouye |
| byf | | | I/L | Atlantic–Congo | | Bete |
| byg | | | I/E | Daju | | Baygo |
| byh | | | I/L | Sino-Tibetan | | Bhujel |
| byi | | | I/L | Niger–Congo? | | Buyu |
| byj | | | I/L | Atlantic–Congo | | Bina (Nigeria) |
| byk | | | I/L | Tai–Kadai | | Biao |
| byl | | | I/L | Bayono–Awbono | | Bayono |
| bym | | | I/L | Pama–Nyungan | | Bidjara |
| byn | | byn | I/L | Afro-Asiatic | | Bilin; Blin |
| byo | | | I/L | Sino-Tibetan | | Biyo |
| byp | | | I/L | Atlantic–Congo | | Bumaji |
| byq | | | I/E | Austronesian | | Basay |
| byr | | | I/L | Trans–New Guinea | | Baruya; Yipma |
| bys | | | I/L | Atlantic–Congo | | Burak |
| byt | | | I/E | Saharan | | Berti |
| (byu) | | | I/L | Tai–Kadai | | Buyang |
| byv | | | I/L | Atlantic–Congo | | Medumba |
| byw | | | I/L | Sino-Tibetan | | Belhariya |
| byx | | | I/L | Baining | | Qaqet |
| (byy) | | | I/L | spurious language | | Buya |
| byz | | | I/L | Ramu | | Banaro |
| bza | | | I/L | Mande | | Bandi |
| bzb | | | I/L | Austronesian | | Andio |
| bzc | | | I/L | Austronesian | | Southern Betsimisaraka Malagasy |
| bzd | | | I/L | Chibchan | | Bribri |
| bze | | | I/L | Mande | | Jenaama Bozo |
| bzf | | | I/L | Sepik | | Boikin |
| bzg | | | I/L | Austronesian | | Babuza |
| bzh | | | I/L | Austronesian | | Mapos Buang |
| bzi | | | I/L | Sino-Tibetan | | Bisu |
| bzj | | | I/L | English-based creole | | Belize Kriol English |
| bzk | | | I/L | English-based creole | | Nicaragua Creole English |
| bzl | | | I/L | Austronesian | | Boano (Sulawesi) |
| bzm | | | I/L | Atlantic–Congo | | Bolondo |
| bzn | | | I/L | Austronesian | | Boano (Maluku) |
| bzo | | | I/L | Atlantic–Congo | | Bozaba |
| bzp | | | I/L | Berau Gulf | | Kemberano |
| bzq | | | I/L | Austronesian | | Buli (Indonesia) |
| bzr | | | I/E | Pama–Nyungan | | Biri |
| bzs | | | I/L | isolate | | Brazilian Sign Language |
| bzt | | | I/C | constructed | | Brithenig |
| bzu | | | I/L | isolate? | | Burmeso |
| bzv | | | I/L | Atlantic–Congo | | Naami |
| bzw | | | I/L | Atlantic–Congo | | Basa (Nigeria) |
| bzx | | | I/L | Mande | | Kɛlɛngaxo Bozo |
| bzy | | | I/L | Atlantic–Congo | | Obanliku |
| bzz | | | I/L | Atlantic–Congo | | Evant |

== Sources ==
- "ISO 639-2 Registration Authority". Library of Congress.
- "ISO 639-3 Registration Authority". SIL International.
- Lewis, M. Paul; Simons, Gary F.; Fennig, Charles D., eds. (2016). "Ethnologue: Languages of the World" (19th ed.). Dallas, Texas: SIL International.
