= BXO (disambiguation) =

BXO may refer to:

- Balanitis xerotica obliterans, a chronic, inflammatory skin disease of unknown cause which can affect the penis
- bxo, the ISO 639-3 code for Barikanchi Pidgin, a pidgin of the Hausa language
- Bronx Opera or BxO, an opera company in the Bronx, New York
- Buochs Airport, the IATA code BXO
