= Bomitaba language =

Bantu language spoken in central Africa

Bomitaba
- Native to: Republic of Congo, Central African Republic
- Native speakers: (9,800 cited 2000)
- Language family: Niger–Congo?: Atlantic–Congo; Benue–Congo; Bantoid; Bantu (Zone C.10); Ngondi–Ngiri; Bomitaba
- Dialects: Northern (Matoki); Central (Epena)

Language codes
- ISO 639-3: zmx
- Glottolog: bomi1238
- Guthrie code: C14

Bomitaba (Mbomitaba) is a Bantu language of the Republic of Congo, with a couple hundred speakers in the Central African Republic.

Maho (2009) lists the C141 Enyele (Inyele), C142 Bondongo languages, which do not have ISO codes, as being closest to Bomitaba, as well as C143 Mbonzo (also known as Bonjo or Impfondo), which does have an ISO code.

Bomitaba is spoken in the northern part of the Congo, particularly on the banks of the Likouala-aux-Herbes river north of Epena. South of Epena the people identify as ethnically Bomitaba but speak the Dibole language, as the term 'Bomitaba' likely arose only during the colonial period.
