= Ngundi language =

Ngundi language might be:

- Gundi language (Ubangian)
- Ingundi language (Bantu)
