= Likouala-aux-Herbes =

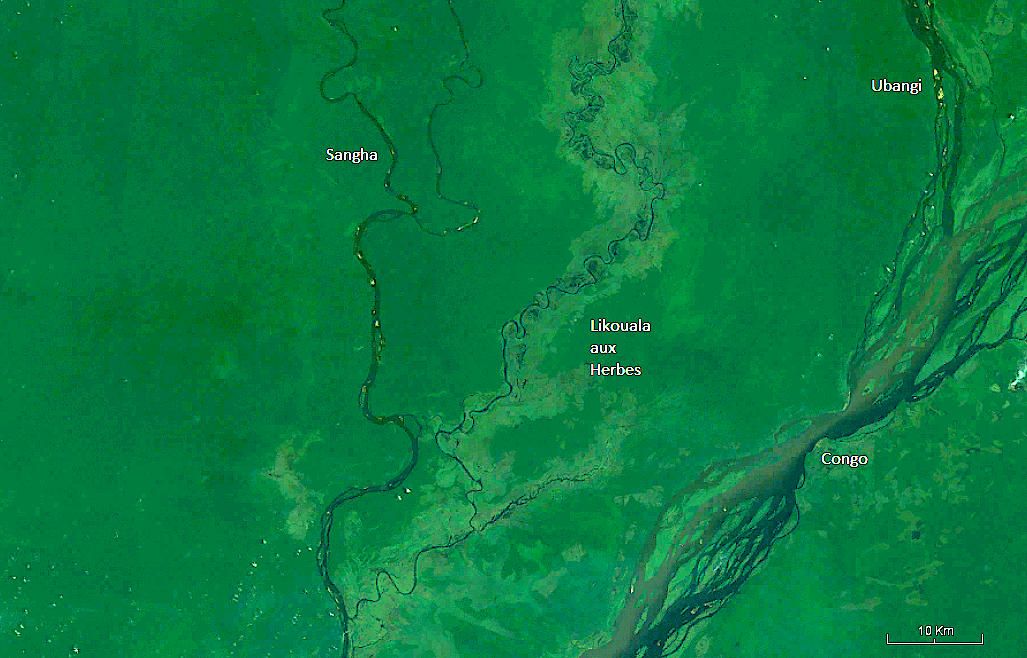
- Mouth of the Likouala-aux-Herbes. Sangha River to the west and Congo River to the east.

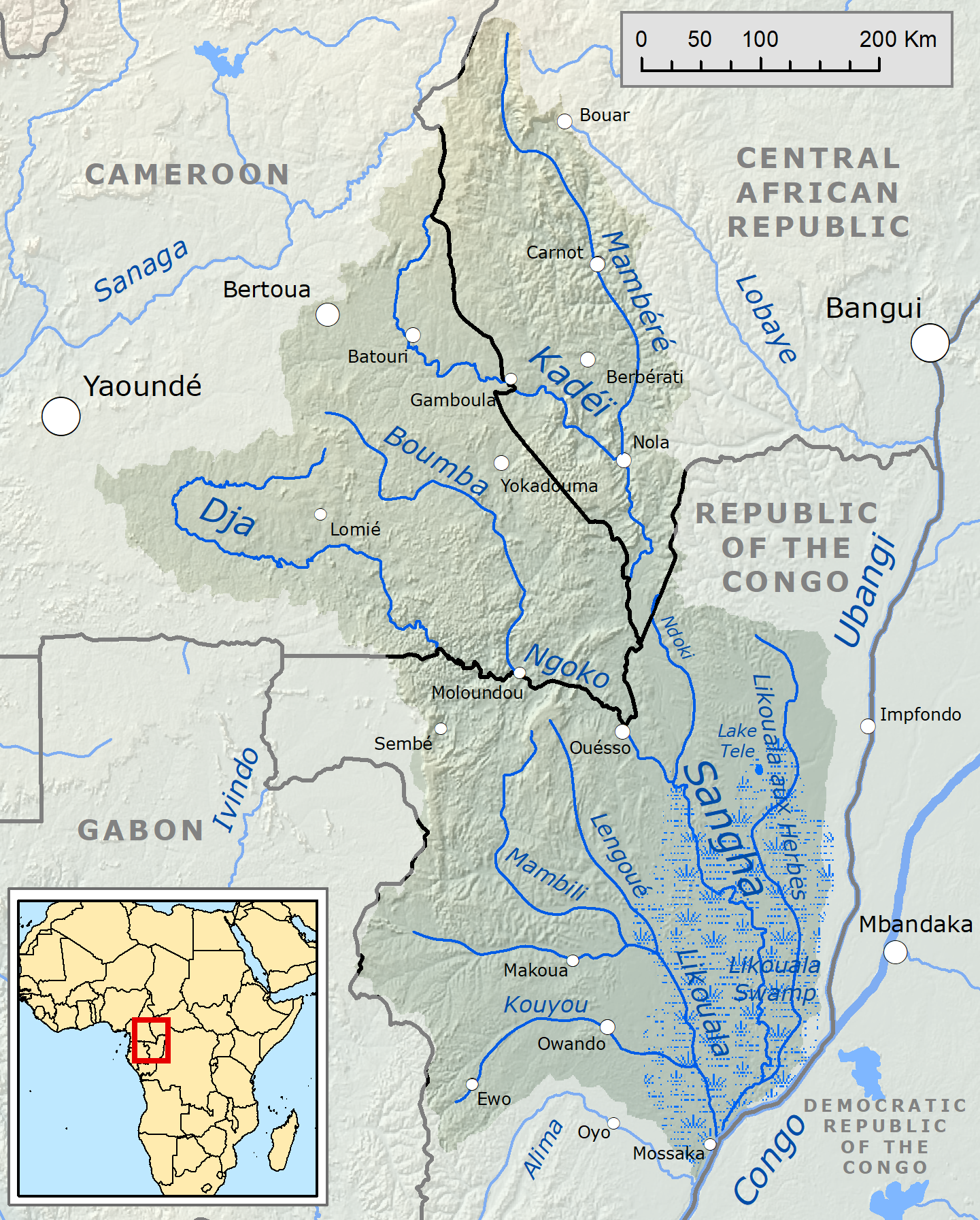
- Sangha River basin, showing the Likouala-aux-Herbes to the east

- Location within Republic of the Congo

Location
- Country: Republic of the Congo
- Department: Likouala

Physical characteristics
- Mouth: Sangha River
  - coordinates: 0.8717°S 17.135°E
- Length: about 700 kilometres (430 mi)
- Basin size: 24,800 square kilometres (9,600 sq mi)
- Discharge
  - location: Botouali
  - average: 281 cubic metres per second (9,900 cu ft/s)

The Likouala-aux-Herbes is a river in the Republic of the Congo. It is a tributary of the Sangha River, which in turn is a tributary of the Congo River. It gives its name to the Likouala Department.

== Location ==
The Likouala-aux-Herbes is almost 700 kilometres (430 mi) long (Note: 700 kilometres (430 mi) long: another source estimates the length at about 750 kilometres (470 mi), including meanders.) and is the main tributary of the Sangha River. The lower Sangha, the Likouala-aux-Herbes and Likouala-Mossaka rivers flow through the Congolese Cuvette, a huge depression. The soil of this region is sand or clay Quaternary fluvial alluvia. The Likouala aux Herbes basin is located on the predominantly sandy Quaternary formations of the Congolese basin.

The course of the Likouala meanders and shifts over time. The coefficient of sinuosity is more than 1.5 in the upper section, around 2.0 in the middle section and in the lower section as high as 2.8. The lower sections of the Sangha and Likouala-aux-Herbes flow through flat land with little difference in elevation between the two rivers. Part of the lower section of the Sangha River divides into two meandering channels, which then recombine. Further down, a "canal" connects the Sangha and Likouala-aux-Herbes some distance above the main confluence of the two rivers. Not long ago the Likouala-aux-Herbes joined the Sangha 130 kilometres (81 mi) upstream from the present confluence.

== Hydrology ==
Between 1951 and 1993 annual rainfall in the Likouala-aux-Herbes basin was 1,714 millimetres (67.5 in) and average discharge at the Botouali gauging station was 281 cubic metres per second (9,900 cu ft/s). The basin above this point covered 24,800 square kilometres (9,600 sq mi).

== Ecology ==
The Congolese Cuvette has an equatorial climate. The waters of the Likouala-aux-Herbes are reddish brown and contain high quantities of humic and fulvic acids. Vegetation in the river basin is dense, humid, shady forest that partly floods during the high water season. The forest around the upper portion opens into a broad grassy plain near Epena, which increases in width further downstream, although in some parts the forest closes in on the river. In the rainy season the river flows over its banks, and it is often practical for a canoe to take a shortcut between two meanders. The river's name, which means "grassy river", derives from the fact that most of its alluvial plain is flooded grassland, dominated by Phacelurus gabonensis on the flooded banks, and Hyparrhenia diplandra on the drier banks.

== People ==
Epena, on the river bank just east of the Lake Télé Community Reserve, is the headquarters of Epena District. Epena is about 100 kilometres (62 mi) downstream from the river's source. It was extremely isolated until 1989, when a paved road from the regional capital Impfondo was opened. Below Epena the villages along the river include Itanga, Dzeke, Edzama, Bouanela and Ebambe, almost 350 kilometres (220 mi) downstream. From Ebambe down to the Sangha the river meanders for about 300 kilometres (190 mi). In and above Itanga the people speak dialects of the Bomitaba language. Below Epena the Babole people speak dialects of the Dibole language. The local people engage in fishing and in subsistence agriculture on areas of drier ground.

== Lake Télé Community Reserve ==
The Lake Télé Community Reserve covers a large area adjoining the right (west) bank of the upper Likouala-aux-Herbes to the east of Epena. It is a wetland ecosystem, part of the Complexe Transfrontalier Lac Télé - Grands Affluents - Lac Tumba, a transboundary Ramsar site established in June 2017. It includes swamp forest, flooded and wooded savanna and floating prairie. Lac Télé has turbid water with much organic matter, but the rivers are rich in fish. Resident birds include African darters (Anhinga rufa). Mammals include western lowland gorillas, chimpanzees, elephants, buffaloes, duikers and hippopotamuses. In 2008 researchers from the Wildlife Conservation Society counted gorilla nests and estimated about 125,000 gorillas were living there, far more than the worldwide total thought to be alive at that time.

== Sources ==
- Laraque, Alain; Mahé, Gil; Orange, Didier; Marieu, Bertrand (2001), "Spatiotemporal variations in hydrological regimes within Central Africa during the XXth century" (PDF), Journal of Hydrology (245): 104–117
- Censier, Claude; Pouyaud, Bernard; Laraque, Alain; Maziezoula, Bienvenue (1995), "Dynamique actuelle des sables de la Likouala aux herbes : implications sur la paléohydrographie du bassin inférieur de la Sangha (République du Congo)" (PDF), in Boulègue J.; Olivry Jean-Claude (eds.), Grands bassins fluviaux périatlantiques : Congo, Niger, Amazone, Colloques et Séminaires (in French), Paris: Éditions de l'ORSTOM, pp. 239–248, ISBN 2-7099-1245-7, ISSN 0767-2896
- "Lac Télé/Likouala-aux-herbes", Ramsar Sites Information Service, Secretariat of the Ramsar Convention
- Leich, Myles (2009), "Language and dialect in Epena District South", Annales Aequatoria, 30, Honoré Vinck: 787–838, JSTOR 25836953
- "More than 100,000 rare gorillas found in Congo", Cable News Network, 5 August 2008, archived from the original on 2012-01-20
- "Relation: Likouala-aus-Herbes (1188608)", OpenStreetMap
