= DZN =

DZN or dzn may refer to:

- DZN, the IATA code for Zhezkazgan Airport, Kazakhstan
- DZN, the station code for Dozan railway station, Balochistan, Pakistan
- dzn, the ISO 639-3 code for Dzando language, Democratic Republic of the Congo
