= BZO =

BZO may refer to:

- Bolzano Airport, with IATA code BZO
- Alliance for the Future of Austria, abbreviated BZÖ
- Bozaba language, a Bantu language of the Democratic Republic of the Congo
