= Epena =

- Location in the Republic of the Congo
- Coordinates: 1°21′19″N 17°27′7″E
- Country: Republic of the Congo
- Department: Likouala
- District: Epena

Population (2023 census)
  - Total: 5,190
  - Ethnicities: Bomitaba

Epena is a village of 5,190 people, the administrative seat of Epena District in the Likouala Department of northeastern Republic of the Congo.

It is on the Likouala-aux-Herbes river, just east of the Lake Télé Community Reserve. A paved road, opened in 1989, links Epena to the departmental capital Impfondo.

The population of Epena is primarily Bomitaba and speaks the Bomitaba language. The village marks a rough divide between the Bomitaba linguistic area and that of the Dibole language to the south.

== Notable residents ==
- Aminata Aboubakar Yacoub - Congolese Olympic swimmer
