= Luimbi language =

Bantu language of Angola

Luimbi
- Native to: Angola
- Native speakers: (44,000 cited 2000)
- Language family: Niger–Congo?: Atlantic–Congo; Benue–Congo; Bantoid; Bantu (Zone K); Chokwe–Luchazi (K.10); Luimbi

Language codes
- ISO 639-3: lum
- Glottolog: luim1238
- Guthrie code: K.12a

Luimbi (also known as Lwimbi, Luimbe, Lwimbe or Chiluimbi) is a minor Bantu language spoken in central Angola. It is related to Nkangala and Mbwela.
