= Budza =

Budza may refer to:

- Budza language
- Serhiy Budza
- Budza, Montenegro, a village near Podgorica
