= Bonjo language =

Atlantic–Congo language spoken in Congo

Bonjo
- Native to: Republic of Congo
- Native speakers: (undated figure of 3,000)
- Language family: Niger–Congo?: Atlantic–Congo; Benue–Congo; Bantoid; Bantu (Zone C.10); Ngondi–Ngiri; Bonjo

Language codes
- ISO 639-3: bok
- Glottolog: bonj1234
- Guthrie code: C143
- ELP: Bonjo

Bonjo, also known as Mbonzo or Impfondo, is a Bantu language spoken by around 3,000 people in northern Republic of Congo, particularly the Likouala Department near the town of Impfondo. Speakers are gradually shifting to Lingala.

The classification of Bonjo has shifted over time. Ethnologue formerly classified it as a southern Gbaya language, but as of the twenty-sixth edition has reclassified it as a Bantoid and member of the Ngondi–Ngiri family. Some sources continue to list it as a southern Gbaya language.

Bonjo is closely related to the Bomitaba language, spoken in the same region.
