= LGZ =

LGZ or lgz may refer to:

- Shannan Lhünzê Airport, Tibet, China (IATA:LGZ)
- Gendza language, spoken in DR Congo (ISO 639-3:lgz)
