= Mbati language =

Bantu language of Central African Republic

Mbati
- Native to: Central African Republic
- Native speakers: 60,000 (2010 census)
- Language family: Niger–Congo?: Atlantic–Congo; Benue–Congo; Bantoid; Bantu (Zone C.10); Ngondi–Ngiri; Mbati

Language codes
- ISO 639-3: mdn
- Glottolog: mbat1248
- Guthrie code: C13

Mbati, also known as Songo, is the principal Bantu language spoken in the Central African Republic, along the Ubangi River in the extreme south of the country.
