= Aka language =

Bantu language of Central Africa

Aka
- Yaka
- Native to: Central African Republic, Republic of Congo
- Ethnicity: Aka people
- Native speakers: (30,000 cited 1986–1996)
- Language family: Niger–Congo?: Atlantic–Congo; Benue–Congo; Bantoid; Bantu (Zone C.10); Ngondi–Ngiri; Aka

Language codes
- ISO 639-3: axk
- Glottolog: yaka1272
- Guthrie code: C.104
- ELP: Yaka

Aka, also known as Yaka or Beka, is a Bantu language spoken in the Central African Republic and Republic of Congo, along the Ubangi River dividing the two countries.

Aka is spoken by the Aka people, pygmies closely related to the Ubangian-speaking Baka of Cameroon, Congo and Gabon. Together, these peoples are known as the Mbenga (Bambenga) or Binga (Babinga), the latter derogatory.

Famously, Aka shares vocabulary with the Baka languages, mostly concerning a specialised forest economy, such as words for edible plants, medicinal plants and honey collecting. This is among the 30% of Aka which is not Bantu and the 30% of Baka which is not Ubangian and has been posited as the remnant of an ancestral Western Pygmy (Mbenga or "Baaka") language which has otherwise vanished. However, it is entirely possible that the Aka shifted to Bantu from a Ubangian language related to Baka, in which case the situation reduces to a single ethnic group adapted to the forest with correspondingly specialised vocabulary. There is no evidence for a wider linguistic affiliation with any of the other Pygmy peoples.

The Aka people call themselves Mraka in the singular and Beka in the plural. The people and their language go by various alternate spellings: Mò-Áka, Moyaka, Bayaka, Yaga, Bayaga, Gbayaka, Biaka, Beká, Yakwa, Yakpa, Yakpwa, Nyoyaka. The western Aka are known as the Benzele (Mbenzélé, Babenzélé, Bambenzele, Ba-Benjelle), and the eastern Aka as the Sese (Basese). These might be distinct dialects; Nzari might be another.

Mikaya-Luma
- Native to: Gabon
- Ethnicity: Mikaya, Baluma
- Language family: Niger–Congo?: ...; Ngondi–Ngiri; Mikaya-Luma

Language codes
- ISO 639-3: None (mis)
- Glottolog: mika1256
- Guthrie code: none

Pygmies of northern Gabon called the Mikaya and Luma are evidently either Aka or speak a language closely related to Aka.

== Phonology ==
=== Consonants ===
Aka has 26 consonants.

		Bilabial	Alveolar	Palatal	Velar	Labio- velar	Glottal
Nasal		m	n				
Plosive/ Affricate	plain	p	t		k	k͡p	
Plosive/ Affricate	voiced	b	d	d͡ʒ	ɡ	ɡ͡b	
Plosive/ Affricate	prenasalized	ᵐb	ⁿd	ⁿd͡ʒ	ᵑɡ	ᵑᵐɡ͡b	
Plosive/ Affricate	implosive	ɓ	ɗ				
Fricative	plain	ɸ	s				h
Fricative	voiced	β					
Lateral			l				
Semivowel				j		w	

=== Vowels ===
Aka has seven vowels.

	Front	Central	Back
Close	i		u
Close-mid	e		o
Open-mid	ɛ		ɔ
Open		a	

== Specialized forest vocabulary ==
Some vocabulary with nearby Baka:

Meaning	Baka	Aka
Dioscorea semperflorens	ʔèsùmà	èsùmà
Fruits of Dioscorea	bèlèbo	èlèbó
Yam borer stick	bòndùngà	ndòngà
Male or old elephant	kàmbà	kàmbà
Elephant tracks	ʔèpùndà	èpùndà
Notched flute (for hunting ritual)	mòbìɔ	mòbìɔ́
Trigona beccari (a stingless bee)	pɛ̀ndɛ̀	vɛ̀ndɛ̀
Queen bee	ɲábɔ̀mɛ̀	èbɔ̀mɛ̀
Pollen	kinda	kíndá
Honeyguide	kpangaadàndù	kpángbá
Dialium pachyphyllum	mbaso	mbàsɔ̀

== Literature ==
- Serge Bahuchet (2012): "Changing Language, Remaining Pygmy." Human Biology: Vol. 84: Iss. 1, Article 9.
