= Mbokomu (deity) =

Ancestor goddess of the Ngombe

- Goddess of Ancestry
- Region: Congo
- Ethnic group: Ngombe people
- Parents: Akongo

Mbokomu was the first woman of Earth according to the traditional belief of the Ngombe people of today's Democratic Republic of the Congo. She was also the first gardener. She is the ancestor of all people.

== Legend ==
Mbokomu is the ancestor goddess of the Ngombe. These are a Bantu people who mostly live along the Congo River in the northwest of the Democratic Republic of the Congo.

Mbokomu was the daughter of the creator god Akongo. Akongo is the supreme being, above all spirits and above all people, but with characteristics like those of a human. He has a special relationship with ancestors, powerful spirits who continue to be concerned with their descendants on earth. He had become upset with the inhabitants of earth and had retired to heaven, hoping for a quiet life. At that time people lived only in heaven with Akongo, where they were happy, but Mbokomu began to cause problems with everyone. Akongo lowered Mbokomu and her son and daughter to earth in a basket with provisions of cassava, maize and sugarcane.

Mbokomu and her children were the first human inhabitants of Earth. She and her children planted a garden. Mbokomu was the first gardener. She wanted to have someone to care for the garden after she and her family died, and told her son to make love to his sister. He objected but his mother insisted. The daughter soon became pregnant. One day the daughter was in the forest where she found a hairy but friendly being. After she had shaved his body he seemed human, but in fact he was a sorcerer. The hairy creature was named Ebenga, which means "the beginner". Ebenga cast a spell on the woman, so her first child brought witchcraft into the world when it was born. Ebenga's witchcraft brought evil to the world, and evil and witchcraft have never left. Other children were born, and in this way the world was populated.

The story of Mbokomu is common to several African tribes. Some say she disliked green things, and is a cause of all droughts. Some say she could slow down time so that seconds became days and days became years. Mbokomu Mons, a mountain on Venus at lat -15.1, lon 215.2, with a diameter of 460 kilometres (290 mi), is named after Mbokomu.

== Sources ==
- Appenzeller, Immo (2012-12-06), Transactions of the International Astronomical Union: Proceedings of the Twenty-Second General Assembly, The Hague 1994, Springer Science & Business Media, ISBN 978-94-009-0163-6
- Allen, Peter J; Saunders, Chas (eds.), "Mbokomu", Godchecker
- Johnson, Allen W.; Price-Williams, Douglass Richard (1996), Oedipus Ubiquitous: The Family Complex in World Folk Literature, Stanford University Press, ISBN 978-0-8047-2577-4
- Leeming, David Adams (2010), Creation Myths of the World: An Encyclopedia, ABC-CLIO, ISBN 978-1-59884-174-9
- "Lindens Name New Sim after African Goddess of Lag", Alphaville Herald, 5 April 2007
- "Mbokomu, a Nuisance, Is Lowered to the Earth", Oxford Reference, Oxford University Press
- Monaghan, Patricia (2014-04-01), Encyclopedia of Goddesses and Heroines, New World Library, ISBN 978-1-60868-218-8
- "Ngombe", Oxford Index, Oxford University Press
