= Chokwe–Luchazi languages =

Clade of Bantu languages

Chokwe–Luchazi
- Linguistic classification: Niger–Congo?: Atlantic–Congo; Benue–Congo; Southern Bantoid; Bantu (Zone K.10); Chokwe–Luchazi

Language codes
- ISO 639-3: –
- Glottolog: chok1244

The Chokwe–Luchazi languages are a clade of Bantu languages coded Zone K.10 in Guthrie's classification. According to Nurse & Philippson (2003), they form a valid node. They include:

- Chokwe
- Luvale
- Luchazi
- Mbunda
- Nyengo
- Luimbi
