= Nkongho language =

Bantu language of Cameroon

Nkongho
- Native to: Cameroon
- Native speakers: (2,200 cited 2000)
- Language family: Niger–Congo?: Atlantic–Congo; Benue–Congo; Bantoid; Bantu (Zone A.10); perhaps Sawabantu?; Nkongho

Language codes
- ISO 639-3: nkc
- Glottolog: nkon1247
- Guthrie code: A.151

Nkongho, or Upper Mbo, is a poorly known Bantu language of Cameroon. Apart from being Bantu, it is not demonstrably related to the Mbo language.
