= Kula language (Bantu) =

Bantu language of DR Congo

Kula
- Likula
- Native to: DR Congo
- Language family: Niger–Congo?: Atlantic–Congo; Benue–Congo; Bantoid; Bantu (Zone C.40); Buja–Ngombe; Kula

Language codes
- ISO 639-3: None (mis)
- Glottolog: None
- Guthrie code: C.415

Kula (Likula) is a Bantu language of the Democratic Republic of Congo.
