= Kusu language =

Bantu language spoken in the DR Congo

Kusu
- Native to: Democratic Republic of the Congo
- Region: Maniema Province
- Native speakers: (26,000 cited 1971)
- Language family: Niger–Congo?: Atlantic–Congo; Benue–Congo; Bantoid; Bantu (Zone C); Tetela (C.70); Kusu

Language codes
- ISO 639-3: ksv
- Glottolog: kusu1252
- Guthrie code: C.72

Kusu (Kutsu) is a Bantu language of Maniema Province, Democratic Republic of the Congo.

Gengele creole is reported to be partly based on Kusu.
