= Ngombe language =

Language spoken in DR Congo

Ngombe
- Lingombe
- Native to: DR Congo
- Native speakers: (150,000 cited 1971)
- Language family: Niger–Congo?: Atlantic–Congo; Volta-Congo; Benue–Congo; Bantoid; Southern Bantoid; Bantu (Zone C.40); Buja–Ngombe; Ngombe

Language codes
- ISO 639-3: ngc
- Glottolog: ngom1268
- Guthrie code: C.41

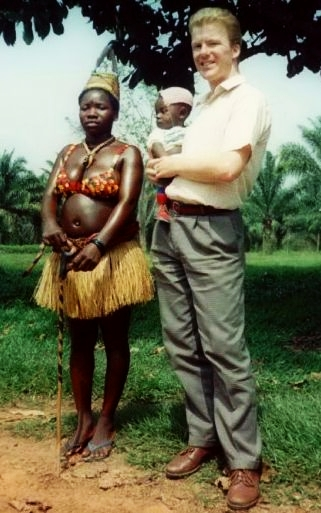
The tradition for a woman's first birth supports the child's survival. The husband is sent home for up to a year - younger sisters carry the baby and a stool for the mother. The mother visits family members and eats a lot.

Ngombe, or Lingombe, is a Bantu language spoken by about 150,000 people in the Democratic Republic of the Congo. In general, native speakers live on either side of the Congo River, and its many tributaries; more specifically, Équateur Province, Mongala District and in areas neighboring it (Sud Ubangi and Équateur districts). Ngombe is written in Latin script.

The deities of the Ngombe include the supreme creator Akongo and the ancestor goddess Mbokomu.

Ngombe includes several dialects in addition to Ngombe proper (Ŋgɔmbɛ). These are Wiindza-Baali, Doko (Dɔkɔ), and Binja (also rendered Binza, Libindja, or Libinja). The latter is not the same as the Binja/Binza language. Binja dialect is primarily spoken in Orientale Province and Aketi Territory, and shares about three-quarters of its linguistic characteristics with standard Ngombe. Maho (2009) lists Doko as a distinct language in a separate group.
