= Buja–Ngombe languages =

Group of Bantu languages

Buja–Ngombe
- Linguistic classification: Niger–Congo?: Atlantic–Congo; Benue–Congo; Southern Bantoid; Bantu (Zone C); Mboshi–Buja?; Buja–Ngombe

Language codes
- ISO 639-3: –
- Glottolog: None ngir1250 (Ngiri Terrien) budj1234 (Bujaic) temb1272 (Motembo-Kunda)

The Buja–Ngombe languages are a group of Bantu languages reported to be a valid clade by Nurse & Philippson (2003). They are Buja (C.37), the Ngombe languages (C.41), and Tembo (C.46):

Budza–Tembo–Kunda–Gbuta–Babale, Ngombe (Doko), Bomboma, Bamwe, Dzando, Gendza, Kula

Guthrie also lists two unclassified C.30 varieties, Doko and Londo (Bolondo). Ethnologue lists the first as a dialect of Ngombe, and says that the latter is most similar to Tembo, so both may belong here. Glottolog lists Bwela as closest to Tembo as well.
