= Bwela language =

Bantu language of DR Congo

Bwela
- Native to: Democratic Republic of Congo
- Native speakers: 8,400 (2002)
- Language family: Niger–Congo?: Atlantic–Congo; Benue–Congo; Bantoid; Bantu; Buja–Ngombe?; Bwela

Language codes
- ISO 639-3: bwl
- Glottolog: bwel1238
- Guthrie code: C.42

Bwela, or Lingi, is a poorly known Congolese Bantu language of uncertain affiliation (though listed as Zone C.40 by Guthrie). It may be close to Tembo.
