= Londo language =

Bantu language spoken in DR Congo

Londo
- Balondo
- Native to: DR Congo
- Native speakers: (3,000 cited 1983 census)
- Language family: Niger–Congo?: Atlantic–Congo; Benue–Congo; Bantoid; Bantu (Zone C.40); Buja–Ngombe; Tembo?; Londo

Language codes
- ISO 639-3: bzm
- Glottolog: bolo1263
- Guthrie code: C302
- ELP: Bolondo

Londo (Balondo) is a Bantu language of the Democratic Republic of Congo. It is closely related to Tembo.
