= Nyanga-li language =

Bantu language of DR Congo

Nyanga-li
- Native to: Democratic Republic of the Congo
- Region: Orientale Province
- Native speakers: 69,000 (2002)
- Language family: Niger–Congo?: Atlantic–Congo; Benue–Congo; Bantoid; Bantu; Boan; Bomokandian; Ngbele–Ngenda; Nyanga-li

Language codes
- ISO 639-3: nyc
- Glottolog: nyan1303
- Guthrie code: D.305,306

Nyanga-li (Linyanga-le) is a Bantu language in Orientale Province, Democratic Republic of the Congo. Gbati-ri (Gbote) is a dialect. Maho (2009) lists them separately as unclassified Zone D.30 languages, but Ethnologue states that they are "members of the same dialect subgroup", and Glottolog places them nearest the Ngendan languages.
