= Tongwe–Bende language =

Bantu languages of Tanzania

Tongwe–Bende
- Native to: Tanzania
- Native speakers: (40,000 cited 1999–2001)
- Language family: Niger–Congo?: Atlantic–Congo; Benue–Congo; Southern Bantoid; Bantu (Zone F.10); Tongwe–Bende
- Dialects: Tongwe; Bende

Language codes
- ISO 639-3: Either: tny – Tongwe bdp – Bende
- Glottolog: tong1320 Tongwe bend1258 Bende
- Guthrie code: F.10 (F.11–12)
- ELP: Bende

Tongwe (Sitongwe) and Bende (Sibende) constitute a clade of Bantu languages coded Zone F.10 in Guthrie's classification. According to Nurse & Philippson (2003), they form a valid node. Indeed, at 90% lexical similarity they may be dialects of a single language.

== Phonology ==
Consonants
| | Labial | Alveolar | Palatal | Velar | Glottal |
|---|---|---|---|---|---|
| Plosive | p b | t d | c ɟ | k g | |
| Fricative | f | s z | | | h |
| Nasal | m | n | ɲ | ŋ | |
| Approximant | w | | j | | |

Vowels
| | Front | Central | Back |
|---|---|---|---|
| High | i iː | | u uː |
| Mid | e eː | | o oː |
| Low | | a ã aː | |

Additionally, Bende has four tones; high, low, rising, and falling.
