= Mbali language =

Bantu language

Mbali
- Native to: Angola
- Language family: Niger–Congo?: Atlantic–Congo; Benue–Congo; Bantoid; Bantu; Southwest Bantu?; (?); Mbali

Language codes
- ISO 639-3: (covered by Umbundu umb)
- Glottolog: None
- Guthrie code: R.103

Mbali (Olumbali, Kimbari) is a minor Bantu language of Angola, spoken on the coast on the southern edge of the large Umbundu-speaking area and the northern end of the uninhabited Namib desert. Its classification is unclear. Arends et al. suggest it might turn out to be a Kimbundu–Umbundu mixed language, though it is nowhere near Kimbundu territory.
