= Mboshi–Buja languages =

Proposed intermediate clade of Bantu languages

Mboshi–Buja
- Linguistic classification: Niger–Congo?: Atlantic–Congo; Benue–Congo; Southern Bantoid; Bantu (Zone C); Mboshi–Buja
- Subdivisions: Ngondi–Ngiri; Mboshi; Buja–Ngombe languages

Language codes
- Glottolog: None

The Mboshi–Buja languages are a proposed intermediate clade of Bantu languages that comprise a large part of Guthrie's Zone C:

- Ngondi–Ngiri (C10, some C30)
- Mboshi (C20)
- Buja–Ngombe languages (C37, C41)
