= Aminata Aboubakar Yacoub =

Republic of the Congo swimmer (born 1989)

Personal information
- Born: June 22, 1989 (age 37) Epena, Republic of the Congo

Sport
- Sport: Swimming

Aminata Aboubakar Yacoub (born 22 June 1989) is a Republic of the Congo swimmer. She competed at the 2012 Summer Olympics in the Women's 50m freestyle event. Yacoub ranked at 69 and would not advance to the semifinals.
