= Doko language (Bantu) =

Bantu language of DR Congo

Doko
- Native to: DR Congo
- Language family: Niger–Congo?: Atlantic–Congo; Benue–Congo; Bantoid; Bantu (Zone C.40); Buja–Ngombe; ?; Doko

Language codes
- ISO 639-3: (included in Ngombe)
- Glottolog: doko1244
- Guthrie code: C.301

Doko is a Bantu language of the Democratic Republic of the Congo. Ethnologue 16 classifies it as a dialect of Ngombe language, while Maho (2009) lists it as a separate, though perhaps unclassified, language.
