= Gengele Creole =

Shabunda- and Kusu-based creole of DR Congo

Gengele
- Kegengele
- Native to: DR Congo
- Region: Kindu
- Language family: Shabunda- and Kusu-based creole

Language codes
- ISO 639-3: –
- Glottolog: geng1244
- Guthrie code: D.20A

Gengele or Kegengele is a creole based on Lega-Shabunda, Kusu and other languages. It is spoken in Kindu, DR Congo. Ethnologue lists it as a dialect of the Songoora language.
