= Ngando language (Central African Republic) =

Bantu language of the Central African Republic

Ngando
- Native to: Central African Republic
- Native speakers: (5,000 cited 1996)
- Language family: Niger–Congo?: Atlantic–Congo; Benue–Congo; Bantoid; Bantu (Zone C.10); Ngondi–Ngiri; Ngando
- Dialects: Kota (Dikota); Ngando

Language codes
- ISO 639-3: ngd
- Glottolog: ngan1304
- Guthrie code: C.102,103

Ngando is a Bantu language spoken by about 5,000 people in the Central African Republic.

Maho (2009) lists Ngando proper and the Kota (Dikota) dialect as separate languages. Kota is not to be confused with the Kota language of Gabon (iKota) or the Kota language of Tamil Nadu, India (Kō mānt).
