= Akongo =

God in African Mythology

Akongo is a Creator God in African mythology. He is worshipped by the Ngombe people of the Congo.

The Christian faith and non-Christian religions explains that Akongo "is not impersonal, like Mana: indeed the people make a clear distinction between the latter and Akongo himself...on the other hand, he is not universally benevolent".

According to legend, Akongo originally lived with people, but left because they were constantly fighting.

His daughter, Mbokomu, caused trouble in heaven so he lowered her down to earth in a basket with her two children. She was the ancestor of all people.
