= Ngondi–Ngiri languages =

Clade of Bantu languages

Ngondi–Ngiri
- Linguistic classification: Niger–Congo?: Atlantic–Congo; Benue–Congo; Southern Bantoid; Bantu (Zone C.10); Mboshi–Buja?; Ngondi–Ngiri

Language codes
- ISO 639-3: –
- Glottolog: None liko1251 (Likouala–Sangha) lito1235 (Litoka)

The Ngondi–Ngiri languages are a clade of Bantu languages. The Ngondi languages are coded Zone C.10 (Ngondi) in Guthrie's classification. According to Nurse & Philippson (2003), they form a valid node with the Ngiri language(s) of C.30:

Ngondi (C.10): Aka (Yaka, Benzele) – Ngando (incl. Kota), Bole (Dibole), Ngondi, Pande (incl. Gongo), Mbati, Bomitaba–Enyele–Bondongo–Mbonzo, Bongili, Bala (Lobala), Bomboli–Bozaba; (C.30) Ngiri (Loi, Likila)–Mabale–Ndobo–Litoka–Balobo–Enga
