= Nkoya language =

Bantu language of Zambia

Nkoya
- Shinkoya
- Native to: Zambia
- Native speakers: 36,000 (2010 census)
- Language family: Niger–Congo?: Atlantic–Congo; Benue–Congo; Bantoid; Bantu; Luban; Luba ?; Nkoya
- Dialects: Nkoya proper; Mbwera (Mbowela); Kolwe (Lukolwe); Shangi (Lushangi); Shasha (Mashasha)

Language codes
- ISO 639-3: nka
- Glottolog: nkoy1244
- Guthrie code: L.60 (L.601–603,61–62)

Nkoya is a Bantu language of Zambia. It may be one of the Luba languages, and is at least Luban.

Maho (2009) considers the various varieties—Mbwera, Kolwe, Shangi, Shasha, and Nkoya proper—to be distinct languages in an Nkoya language cluster.
