= Dzando language =

Bantu language of the Democratic Republic of the Congo

Dzando
- Native to: DR Congo
- Native speakers: (6,000 cited 1983 census)
- Language family: Niger–Congo?: Atlantic–Congo; Benue–Congo; Bantoid; Bantu (Zone C.40); Buja–Ngombe; Dzando

Language codes
- ISO 639-3: dzn
- Glottolog: dzan1238
- Guthrie code: C413
- ELP: Dzando

Dzando is a Bantu language of the Democratic Republic of the Congo.
