= Pande language =

Bantu language of the Central African Republic

Pande
- Pande-Gongo
- Native to: Central African Republic
- Native speakers: 8,870 (2010 census)
- Language family: Niger–Congo?: Atlantic–Congo; Benue–Congo; Bantoid; Bantu (Zone C.10); Ngondi–Ngiri; Pande
- Dialects: Gongo

Language codes
- ISO 639-3: bkj
- Glottolog: pand1264
- Guthrie code: C.12
- ELP: Pande

Pande, also known as Pande-Gongo after its two dialects, is a Bantu language of the Central African Republic.
