= Bolo language =

Bantu language of Angola

Bolo
- Ngoya
- Kibala
- Native to: Angola
- Native speakers: (2,600 cited 2000)
- Language family: Niger–Congo?: Atlantic–Congo; Benue–Congo; Bantoid; Bantu (Zone H); Kimbundu (H.20); Bolo
- Dialects: Ipala (Kibala); Hebó; Ucela; Mbwĩ; Bolo; Sende

Language codes
- ISO 639-3: blv
- Glottolog: bolo1261
- Guthrie code: H.23
- ELP: Bolo

Bolo, also known as Ngoya and Kibala, is a Bantu language of Angola that is closely related to Kimbundu.

== Name ==
The only name for the language as a whole, 'Ngoya', was originally pejorative, though it has become more accepted. 'Kibala' is the Umbundu name for the central dialect, Ipala. 'Bolo' is a peripheral dialect.

== Varieties ==
The dialects of this language are Ipala, Hebó, Ucela, Mbwĩ, Bolo and Sende.
