= Guru language =

Bantu language of South Sudan

Guru
- Boguru
- Native to: South Sudan
- Ethnicity: 500
- Extinct: 2011 in South Sudan. Nearly extinct in DR Congo.
- Language family: Niger–Congo?: Atlantic–Congo; Volta-Congo; Benue–Congo; Bantoid; Southern Bantoid; Bantu; Boan; Bomokandian; Ngendan?; Guru

Language codes
- ISO 639-3: bqu
- Glottolog: bogu1241
- Guthrie code: D.302
- ELP: Boguru

The Guru language, or Boguru, is a poorly documented South Sudanese Bantu language of uncertain affiliation (though listed as unclassified Zone D.30 by Guthrie). For a while, a number of speakers were refugees in DR Congo, but the language is nearly extinct there as well.
