= Epena District =

Coordinates: 1°19′N 17°08′E

Epéna
- District
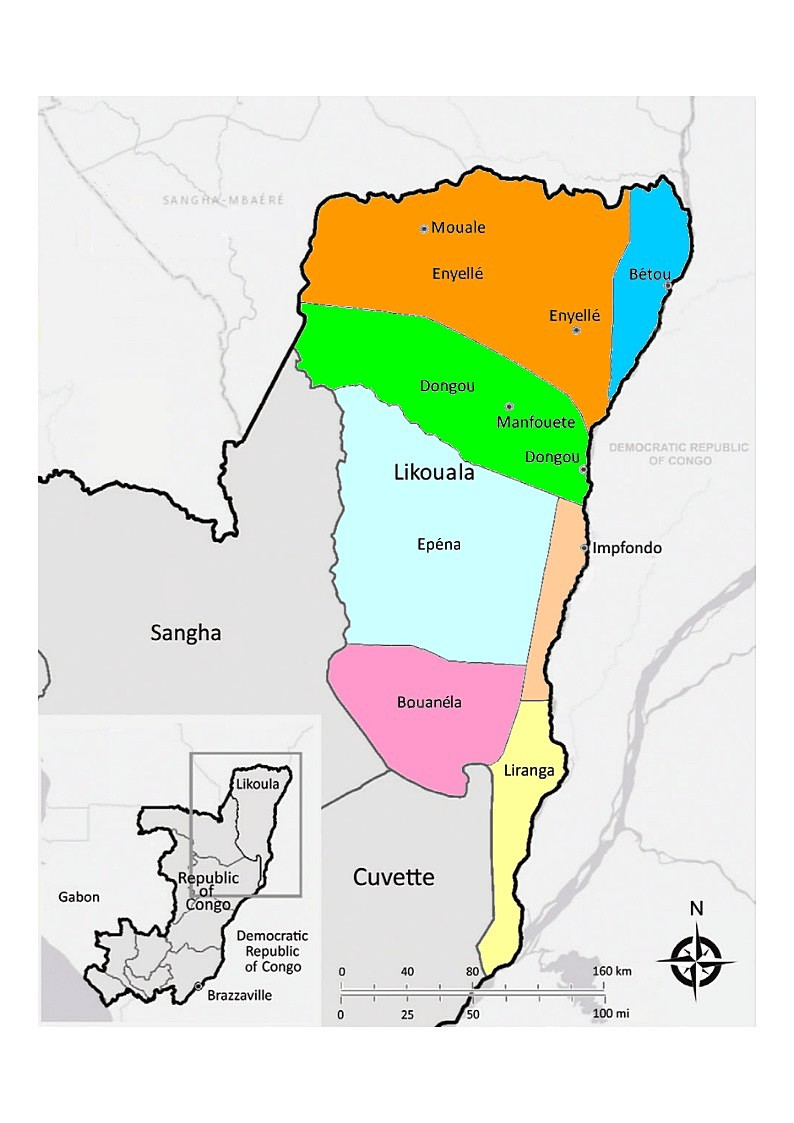
- Epéna District in the Likouala Department
- Country: Republic of the Congo
- Department: Likouala Department
- Seat: Epéna

Area
  - Total: 6,297 sq mi (16,308 km^{2})

Population (2023 census)
  - Total: 32,110
  - Density: 5.100/sq mi (1.969/km^{2})
- Time zone: UTC+1 (GMT +1)

Epena is a district in the Likouala Department of north-eastern Republic of the Congo. The capital lies at Epéna.

== Towns and villages ==
- Epéna

== See also ==
- Lake Tele
- Lake Mboukou
