= Manenguba languages =

Bantu language spoken in Cameroon

Manenguba
- Mbo, Ngoe
- Native to: Cameroon
- Ethnicity: Bakossi, Mbo, Bakaka, Bassossi
- Native speakers: (180,000 cited 1995–2004)
- Language family: Niger–Congo?: Atlantic–Congo; Volta–Congo; Benue–Congo; Bantoid; Southern Bantoid; Bantu (Zone A.15); Manenguba

Language codes
- ISO 639-3: Variously: mbo – Mbo bss – Akoose bqz – Kaka (Central Mbo) bsi – Sosi
- Glottolog: mane1268
- Guthrie code: A.15

The Manenguba languages, also known as the Mbo cluster, are a group of closely related Bantu languages spoken on and around the Manenguba mountain range in south-western Cameroon.

The people speaking the various Manenguba languages belong to the following tribes or nations: Mienge, Mbo, Basossi, Bakossi, Elung, Nninong, Mousmenam, Manengouba, Bareko, Manehas, Bakaka, Balondo, Babong and Bafun. The population speaking the Manenguba languages was estimated in 1984 to be about 230,000 people.

According to Hedinger (1984a), there are at least 23 different Manenguba languages and dialects. The best known of these, and the first to have a grammar written for it, is Akoose, spoken in a wide area to the west of the mountain.

== Name of the languages ==
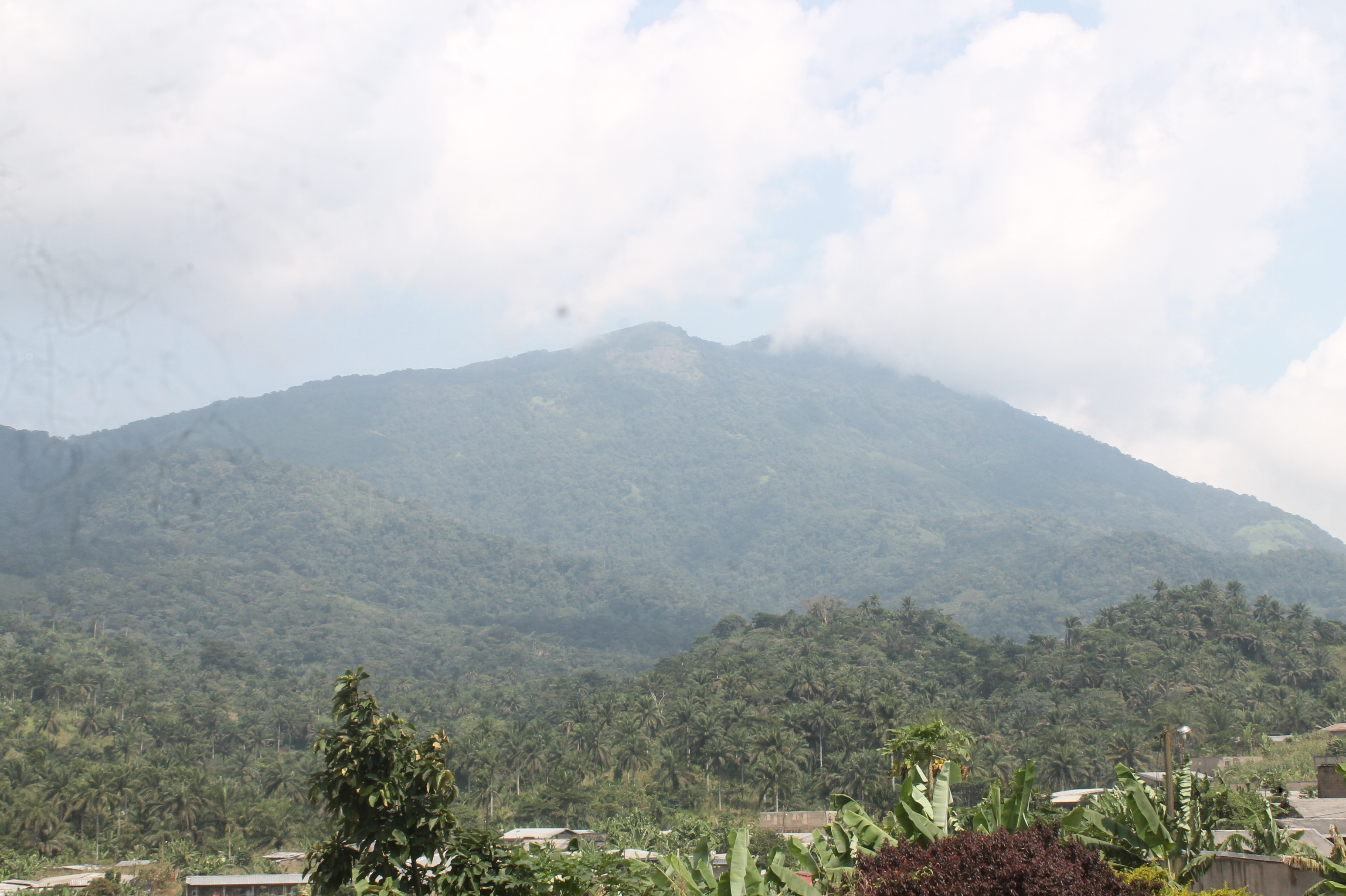
Manenguba Mountain (a former volcano) seen from Nkongsamba on the Eastern side

The name "Manenguba languages" was first used by Harry Johnston in his work A Comparative Study of the Bantu and Semi-Bantu Languages (1919). Johnston divided the languages into three groups: (a) Balung-Bafo (including Melong); (b) Bakosi (including Nkosi and Nhaalemooe); and (c) Bangtangte (including Ngoten). However, Balung-Bafo is no longer considered part of the Manenguba group.

The term "Mbo Cluster" was used by Malcolm Guthrie in 1953, following the generalised use of the term by G. Tessmann in 1932. However, the name Mbo properly applies only to dialects in the north and north-east area of the region and is found objectionable by Manenguba speakers from other areas. It therefore seems unsatisfactory as a designation for the languages as a whole.

Another name, "Ngoe", was proposed by Erhardt Voeltz c.1975, after the name of the legendary ancestor of some of the tribes. However, this name also has not gained acceptance, since not all the Manenguba tribes consider him to be their ancestor; in particular, the Mbo consider that they are descended from Mbo.

== Languages ==
A lexico-statistical study by the Swiss linguist Robert Hedinger (1984a) showed that the various languages can be classified as follows:

- North-Eastern Group

Mbo of Mboébo
Mbo of Ngwatta

- North-Western Group

Myəngə (Mienge, Mbo of Nguti)
Nswasə (Basossi)

- Central Group: Eastern Cluster

Mkaaeʔ (Bakaka)
Belon (Balondo)
Babong
Mwaneka (Baneka)
Manenguba
Mwahɛd (Manehas)
Bafun
Mbaʔ (Bareko)

- Central Group: Western Cluster

Akɔɔse (Kose, Akosi, Bakossi, Bekoose, Koose, Nkoosi, Nkosi)
Nnɛnong (Nninong, Ninong)
Mwamenam (Mouamenam)
Eluŋ
Ngemengə (Ngemengoe)
Mbo of Ekanang (Mbouroukou)

The languages of the Eastern Cluster are closely related and can be considered as dialects of the same language, although they have no common name. In the Western Cluster, most of the languages are also closely related, although Mbo of Ekanang, situated on the north-east side of the mountain, stands slightly apart from the others.

According to Hedinger (1987), the Bafaw-Balong language included in Guthrie zone A.15 for cultural reasons needs to be excluded from Manenguba on linguistic grounds; Maho (2009) separates it as A.141. Hedinger also excludes Lekongo (Nkongho), spoken in a region between the North-West Group and the North-East Group, on the grounds that its vocabulary has few words in common with the other languages. Using a modified version of the 100-word and 200-word Swadesh lists, Hedinger found that Lekongo has around 50% of core vocabulary shared with the Manenguba languages, whereas amongst the Manenguba languages themselves as defined above around 67%–95% of core vocabulary is shared between one language and another.

There are many loan words from English, French and Douala. When speaking of technical subjects, speakers will often revert to Pidgin English or English.

== Early descriptions ==
The first European record of a Manenguba language was made by Hannah Kilham, a teacher from Yorkshire who taught in Sierra Leone, in 1828. She collected vocabularies of up to 79 words in 30 different African languages, one of which, called Moko, with 67 words, has been identified as a Manenguba dialect of the Eastern cluster, perhaps Mwahed, Mkaa', Belon, or Babong.

Another collection of vocabularies (but each containing only a very few words) was made by a missionary John Clarke (Baptist missionary), working in the nearby island of Fernando Pó, published in 1848. It contains words in ten dialects which appear to be Manenguba or closely related to it.

A more extensive record of 280 Manenguba words and phrases, in three different dialects, was made by the German missionary Sigismund Koelle working in Sierra Leone, and published as part of his work Polyglotta Africana in 1854. He called the language itself Mokō, like Hannah Kilham, and the three dialects Ngoteng, Melong, and Nhālemōe. The first two of these dialects appear to be from the Eastern cluster, perhaps Mwahed, Mkaa' or Belon, while the third is from the Western cluster, and is close to Akoose, Ninong, or Mwamenam.

The first descriptive grammar of a Manenguba language was made by the German missionary Heinrich Dorsch, who published a Grammatik der Nkosi-Sprache in 1910/11, as well as German-Nkosi and Nkosi-German vocabularies.

== Phonology ==
=== Consonants ===
The various Manenguba dialects differ slightly in their phonology. For example, in several, the original sound /f/ has become /h/, while in others it remains /f/. The Akoose and Mbo dialects may be taken as representative of the languages as a whole. They both have the following consonants:

		Bilabial	Coronal	Palatal	Velar	Glottal
Nasal		m	n	ɲ	ŋ	
Plosive/ Affricate	voiceless	p	t	tʃ	k	ʔ
Plosive/ Affricate	voiced	b	d		g	
Plosive/ Affricate	prenasal	ᵐb	ⁿd	(ᶮdʒ)	ᵑɡ	
Fricative	voiceless		s			h
Fricative	voiced		z			
Fricative	prenasal		ⁿz			
Approximant		w	l	j		
Vibrant			r			

- /tʃ/ is written as ⟨j⟩ in Hedinger et al. (1981), but as ⟨ch⟩ in Hedinger (ed) (2016).
- /ʔ/ is written as ⟨'⟩. It is found only at the end of words.
- /b/ is usually the implosive [ɓ] except before /i u w/. ⟨mb⟩ is generally pronounced [ᵐɓ]. However, in class 9 nouns it is [ᵐb].
- /ⁿd, ᵑg, ⁿz/ also occur in class 9/10 words. /ⁿz/ was originally a postalveolar affricate [ᶮdʒ]. This pronunciation is still preserved in Mbo, Mkaa' and Belon, but has become [ⁿz] in Akoose and most of the other Manenguba languages.
- /j/ is written as ⟨y⟩ and /ɲ/ is written as ⟨ny⟩. In some of the Manenguba dialects, /ɲ/ has become /j/; for example, Akoose nyoŋ = Mwaneka yuŋ 'hair'.
- Word-initially, certain consonants can be labialized or palatalized:
  - /mʷ nʷ pʷ kʷ bʷ sʷ hʷ/
  - /mʲ nʲ pʲ tʲ tʃʲ dʲ sʲ hʲ lʲ/
- It is also common for consonants to be preceded by a syllabic nasal word-initially:
  - /m̩b m̩m n̩n n̩h ŋ̍k n̩l n̩s n̩t/
  - /m̩bʷ m̩mʷ m̩pʷ ŋ̍kʷ ŋ̍gʷ n̩sʷ/
  - /ɲ̩tʃʲ n̩dʲ n̩lʲ n̩sʲ n̩tʲ n̩zʲ/
- /g, ŋ/ cannot usually begin a word, except in /ᵑɡ/ (written ⟨ng⟩).
- Word internally combinations such as /gt lk ln ŋn ŋs/ are found.
- Words can end in a vowel or in /m n ŋ ʔ b d g w l j/.

=== Vowels ===
In Akoose there are eight vowels (though these are believed to derive from seven vowels in the proto-language):

	Front	Central	Back
Close	i		u
Close-mid	e	ə	o
Open-mid	ɛ	ə	ɔ
Open		a	

All the vowels can be both long or short, although some dialects lack a distinction between some of the long vowels.

In Hedinger (2016), the long vowels are written double: "ii ee ɛɛ aa əə ɔɔ oo uu".

=== Tones ===
The Manenguba languages are tonal. All the languages have a very similar tonal system. There are high tones (H), low tones (L), and contour tones (rising and falling). These are written á, a, ă, and â respectively, or in long vowels áá, aa, aá, and áa. Syllabic m and n can sometimes carry a tone, for example Akoose ḿmem "my" (classes 3, 4, 6), ńhal "speckled mouse-bird".

The tones display downdrift; that is, in a sequence H L H, the second H is slightly lower than the first. In some words there is also downstep in which in a sequence H H, the second H is slightly lower than the first, probably because historically an intervening L syllable was absorbed or dropped. A downstepped H is written ā in Hedinger (2016). In a long vowel, H and downstepped H can make a contour tone, for example Akɔ́ɔ̄sē "Akoose language".

Tones distinguish one word from another; for example, in Akoose, -láán "three" has a high tone, -niin "four" has a low tone, and -táan "five" has a falling tone. Tones also have a grammatical function in verbs; for example, in Akoose, the word for "he has thrown" is apimé in a main clause, but ápímé, with a high tone, in some kinds of dependent clause.

== Grammar ==
=== Noun classes ===
As in other Bantu languages, nouns in the Manenguba languages are divided into different classes. Typically nouns belong to classes 1 to 10, but there are also some nouns in classes 13, 14, and 19. Singular and plural classes are paired together to make "genders". Classes 2, 4, 6, 8, 10, and 13 are generally plurals of 1, 3, 5, 7, 9, and 19 respectively, but other pairings are found. Some nouns have no singular-plural distinction and occur in only one class.

The class of a noun can often be judged from its prefix. The prefix may differ depending on whether the root starts with a consonant or a vowel; for example, in Akoose, class 5 starts with a- for a consonant stem, but d(y)- for a vowel stem. Nouns with the suffix -ɛ in Akoose belong to classes 1/2, whatever the prefix.

The following examples of nouns come from Akoose:

Gender 1/2

- nchîb, bechîb = thief, thieves
- mod, bad = person, people

Gender 3/4

- nchém, nchém = bat(s)
- ntyə́g, ntyə́g = box(es)

Gender 5/6

- abad, mebad = cloth(s)
- dúu, múu = nose(s)

Gender 7/8

- echem, e’chem = tongue(s)
- chyaá, byaá = leaf, leaves

Gender 7/6

- ekuu, mekuu = leg(s)
- ehɔ́b, mehɔ́b = voice(es)

Gender 9/10

- káb, káb = antelope(s)
- nyǎd, nyǎd = forest buffalo(s)

Gender 14/6

- eʼmii, memii = finger(s)
- bwɛl, mɛl = tree(s)

Gender 19/13

- hyǒn, lǒn = firewood
- hyɛn, lɛn = mushroom(s)

=== Concords ===
As with other Bantu languages, adjectives, pronouns, numerals 1 to 5, demonstratives, verbs, and the associative marker (in Akoose a/á/é) "of" must all agree with the class of the noun they refer to, by the use of the appropriate prefixes. For example, the Akoose word băn "children" is in class 2, which uses the concord be or bé, making a sentence such as:

- á-bé băn bé-bɛ bé-dyâg "those (á-bé) two (bé-bɛ) children (băn) are eating (bé-dyâg)"

=== Associative marker ===
The associative marker is a particle (in Akoose a/á/é) which joins together two nouns to make a noun phrase or compound noun. This particle agrees in class with the first of the two nouns. The following examples are from Akoose:

- aláá á mbɔ́té "clothes iron" (class 5)
- meláá mé mbɔ́té "clothes irons" (class 6)
- ntyə́g ḿ mbɔ́té "clothes box" (class 3)

In Mwaneka, on the other hand, the particle is omitted, but, except following a noun of class 1 or class 9, generally leaves a trace in the form of a high tone. This high tone sometimes affects the first of the two nouns, and sometimes the second:

- ekwɛ́m múl "bottle of oil" (cf. mǔl "oil")
- băl ojíw "thieves" (cf. bal "people")

=== Locative nouns ===
A locative marker which resembles a class 5 prefix but with a high tone can be prefixed to nouns of any class. In this case concordial markers change to take the concords of class 5. An example from Akoose is:

- ndáb e-bóó "the house is good" (class 9)
- á-ndáb á-bóó "in the house it is good" (class 5)

=== Verbs ===
Verbal roots are divided into two classes, bearing high and low tone respectively, e.g. Akoose bom "meet" (low tone), wɔ́g "wash" (high tone). The root can be extended by one of a number of verbal extensions. For example, from the root bom "meet" can be derived bomɛn "meet with", bomed "arrange", bomtɛn "join together" and so on.

Except in the Imperative mood, the verb always has a prefix. In Akoose, the infinitive has the prefix a- or â-: âbom "to meet", âwɔ́g (or awɔ́g) "to wash"; this takes concords of class 5 nouns. Finite forms of the verb have a prefix indicating the person "I, you (sg), he/she, we, you (pl), they" or agreeing with the noun-class of the subject. In addition, Akoose has a prefix de- meaning "we two (i.e. you and I)".

Akoose also has a logophoric verbal prefix mə́- "he/she/you" used in indirect speech in sentences such as the following:

- adogté mə́ áte aá mə́ə̄bɛ́ mbɔ́té "he lied that he would give him a robe"

The use of mə́- rather than a- makes it clear that the second "he" refers to the speaker, not another person.

In the present indicative mood, the prefixes for "I, you (sg), he/she", "we two", and the class 1 and class 9 prefixes, all have a low tone, but all the others have a high tone.

Every finite verb has two forms, one used in main clauses and the other in certain types of dependent clause. The dependent form is used in temporal clauses ("at that time when he did the work..."), relative clauses ("the work which the man did"), clefts ("it was yesterday he did the work"), and certain types of question ("who is it that you saw?"), which are expressed as a type of relative clause. However, when the head noun is the subject of the relative clause (e.g. "the man who did the work"), the independent form of the verb is used. The dependent form of the verb differs from the independent form in that it always has a high tone on the prefix, and it also usually has a high-toned suffix -ɛ́ or -nɛ́ as well, depending on the tense.

Negative verbs are expressed by adding a high-toned suffix, usually -á (Mwaneka) or -ɛ́ (Akoose). Before the verb stem there is usually an infix as well, which varies according to the tense. In the subjunctive and imperative, the negative suffix is -ká (Mwaneka).

Auxiliary verbs are very common in Manenguba languages; Akoose has about 70 such verbs. These express meanings such as "he is in the process of (doing)", "he was the first (to do)", "he has finished (doing)", "he was quick (to do)", "he is accustomed (to do)" and so on, which in other languages might be expressed by adverbs such as "at present", "first", "already", "quickly", or "always". Auxiliary verbs are followed by the infinitive. The following example is from Akoose:

- asébpé apɛ hɛ́n "he was first to arrive here" / "he got here first"

== Bibliography ==
- Ewane Etame, Jean (ed.) (2018). Mkaaʼ – French lexicon and French - Mkaaʼ index. Second edition, updated and edited by Robert Hedinger.
- Hedinger, Robert, Joseph Ekandjoum, and Sylvia Hedinger (1981). Petite grammaire de la langue mboó. Association des étudiants mboó de l’Université de Yaoundé. (Describes the Baneka/Mwaneka dialect of the Eastern cluster.)
- Hedinger, Robert (1984a). A Comparative-Historical Study of the Manenguba languages (Bantu A.15, Mbo Cluster) of Cameroon (PhD thesis). University of London. doi:10.25501/SOAS.00028528.
- Hedinger, Robert (1984b). "Reported Speech in Akɔɔse". Studies in African Linguistics, 12 (3). pp. 81–102.
- Hedinger, Robert (1987), The Manenguba Languages (Bantu A. 15, Mbo Cluster) of Cameroon. Routledge.
- Hedinger, Robert (2008). A Grammar of Akoose: A northwest Bantu Language. Dallas: SIL International.
- Hedinger, Robert (ed.). (2016). Akoose–English Dictionary. SIL International.
