= Gendza language =

Language

Gendza
- Ligendza
- Native to: DR Congo
- Native speakers: (43,000 cited 1986)
- Language family: Niger–Congo?: Atlantic–Congo; Benue–Congo; Bantoid; Bantu (Zone C.40); Buja–Ngombe; Gendza

Language codes
- ISO 639-3: lgz
- Glottolog: lige1238
- Guthrie code: C414

Gendza (Ligendza, Digenja) is a Bantu language of the Democratic Republic of Congo.
