= Ngiri language =

Bantu language spoken in DR Congo

Ngiri
- Native to: Democratic Republic of the Congo
- Region: Ngiri River, Équateur Province
- Native speakers: (80,000 cited 2000–2002)
- Language family: Niger–Congo?: Atlantic–Congo; Benue–Congo; Bantoid; Bantu (Zone C.10–30); Ngondi–Ngiri; Ngiri
- Dialects: Loi/Likila; Nunu (Kenunu, C.31c); Mabaale; Ndoobo; Litoka; Balobo; Enga

Language codes
- ISO 639-3: Variously: biz – Loi (Baloi) lie – Likila (Balobo) ndw – Ndobo mmz – Mabaale
- Glottolog: libi1251 Libinzic balo1261 Loi-Likila
- Guthrie code: C.31

Ngiri is a Bantu language closely related to Lingala.

Maho (2009) lists C311 Mabaale (Mabale), C312 Ndoobo (Ndobo), C313 Litoka, C314 Balobo, and C315 Enga (Baenga-Bolombo) as distinct languages.
