= Guthrie classification of Bantu languages =

Linguistic classification

The 250 or so "Narrow Bantu languages" are conventionally divided up into geographic zones first proposed by Malcolm Guthrie (1967–1971). These were assigned letters A–S and divided into decades (groups A10, A20, etc.); individual languages were assigned unit numbers (A11, A12, etc.), and dialects further subdivided (A11a, A11b, etc.). This coding system has become the standard for identifying Bantu languages; it was a practical way to distinguish many ambiguously named languages before the introduction of ISO 639-3 coding, and it continues to be widely used. Only Guthrie's Zone S is (sometimes) considered to be a genealogical group. Since Guthrie's time a Zone J (made of languages formerly classified in groups D and E) has been set up as another possible genealogical group bordering the Great Lakes.

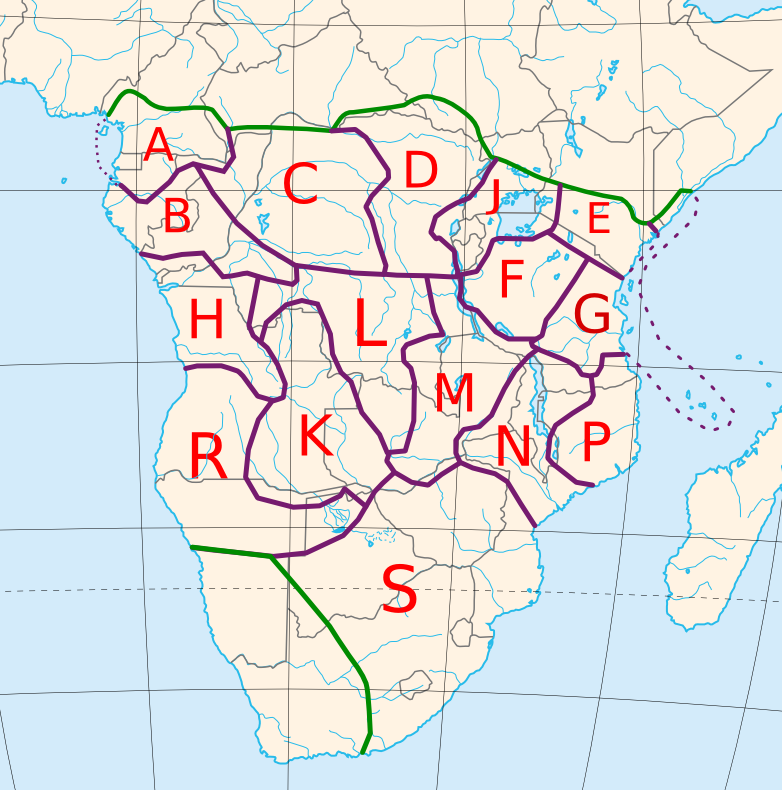
The approximate locations of the sixteen Guthrie Bantu zones, including the addition of a zone J around the Great Lakes. The Jarawan languages are spoken in Nigeria.

The list is first summarized, with links to articles on accepted groups of Bantu languages (bold decade headings). Following that is the complete 1948 list, as updated by Guthrie in 1971 and by J. F. Maho in 2009.

== Summary ==
The list below reflects Guthrie as updated by Maho (2009). Not included in detail are the Northeast Bantu languages characterized by Dahl's Law, which is thought to be a genealogical group, cuts across the Guthrie system, and is covered at Northeast Bantu. Other groups with dedicated articles, such as Southern Bantu (Zone S) are also only summarized here, so that the initial listing is only a summary and an index for other articles.

Maho (2009) added languages to the Guthrie classification which Guthrie overlooked and shifted many of the languages of zones D and E to the new zone J proposed by Tervuren scholars; his amended version of the Guthrie linguistic has since replaced the original Guthrie list in use among Bantu scholars

Bantu has long been divided into Northwest Bantu (Forest Bantu) and Central Bantu (Savanna Bantu) branches based upon tone patterns, but there is little agreement as to which Guthrie zones (or which parts of zones) should be in either, the dichotomy is dubious, and they have not been followed here.

Accepted genealogical groups within the Guthrie zones are boldfaced.

=== Zone A ===
S Cameroon, Equatorial Guinea, N Gabon

- **A10** Lundu–Balong : Oroko, Bonkeng, Nkongho, Bafaw-Balong, Manenguba (Ngoe) languages
- **A20–30** Sawabantu languages; Bube (in Mbam?)
- **A40a** (reduced) Basaa languages
- **A50** Bafia languages
- **A60+40b** Mbam languages
- **A70** Beti language
- **A80–90** Makaa–Njem languages

Zone A is sometimes considered Forest Bantu.

Part of Guthrie's A40 and A60 groups are regarded as Mbam languages. Sawabantu may include some of the A10 languages apart from Manenguba, whereas Bube may belong in Mbam.

A number of scholars have proposed linking Southern Bantoid Jarawan with the Mbam sub-group (Gerhardt 1982; Blench ms 2006, 2011); this proposal remains controversial and is opposed by Green and Grollemund (2026).

According to several scholars, including Blench, there can be no coherent concept of Bantu as long as many of the Zone A and perhaps Zone B languages are included.

=== Zone B ===
S Gabon, W Congo, W DR-Congo

- **B20** Kele languages (?Seki)
- **B10–30** Tsogo languages (?Myene)
- **B40** (with some H10) Sira languages
- **B50** Nzebi languages
- **B60** Mbete languages
- **B70** (with some B80) Teke languages
- **B80** (reduced) Boma–Dzing languages (Tsong/Songo?)

Zone B is sometimes considered Forest Bantu.

B10–30 may belong together as Kele–Tsogo, B40 with Kongo–Yaka (H), and B50–70 with H24 Songo as Teke–Mbede.

=== Zone C ===
NW DR-Congo, N Congo

- **C10** (with some C30) Ngondi–Ngiri languages
- **C20** Mboshi languages
- **C30** (with Mongo, etc) Bangi–Ntomba languages (Lingala et al.)
- **C37+41** Buja–Ngombe languages
- C42 Bwela
- **C40a** Bati–Angba languages (Bwa)
- **C50–60** Soko languages
- **C70** Tetela languages
- **C80** Bushoong languages

Zone C is sometimes considered Forest Bantu, sometimes Savanna Bantu.

There are proposals for three larger clades, Mboshi–Buja covering C10–20 and C37+41, and Bangi–Tetela covering C30 with C50–80 (Motingea 1996), and C40a together with D20–30 in Boan.

=== Zone D ===
NE DR-Congo

- **D10** Mbole–Enya languages (?Lengola)
- **D20a** Lega–Binja languages
- **D20–30** Komo–Bira languages, (with C40a) Boan
- D28 Holoholo (perhaps in NE Bantu)
- D30 (unclassified): Guru (Boguru), Ngbinda, Kare (Kari), Nyanga-li (Gbati-ri)
- **D33** Nyali languages (Beeke? Ngbee?, +Bodo?)
- **D43–55** Nyanga–Buyi languages
- D54 Bembe (with Lega?)

D10, D30, and some of D20 and D40 are sometimes considered Forest Bantu, the others Savanna Bantu.

Most of D40–60 has been moved to Great Lakes Bantu languages. Lengola, Bodo, and Nyali may belong together as Lebonya, and Beeke in Boan.

=== Zone E ===
Kenya, apart from Swahili

The languages of Zone E have been reassigned: E10–E40 to Great Lakes Bantu languages; E50 Kikuyu–Kamba (Central Kenya Bantu) and E60 Chaga–Taita to Northeast Bantu; E70 Nyika to Northeast Bantu, mostly in Sabaki.

=== Zone F ===
W & C Tanzania.

- **F10** Tongwe-Bende
- **F30** (reduced) Mbugwe–Rangi languages
- ?Isanzu

Much of F20 and F30, including the major language Sukuma, have been reclassified as Northeast Bantu, with Bungu to Rukwa and Sumbwa as Great Lakes. Mbugwe–Rangi, however, form a valid node by themselves.

Isanzu is sometimes classified as F30, as a variety of Nilamba, and sometimes thought to be a remnant of the Bantu languages spoken in the area before F-zone languages arrived.

=== Zone G ===
E Tanzania, Comoros

- **G50** (with Mbunga) Kilombero

The languages of Zone G have been reclassified, G60 Bene–Kinga to Northeast Bantu, and the other branches more specifically to Northeast Coast Bantu languages.

=== Zone H ===
NW Angola, W Congo

- **H10** (reduced) Kongo languages
- **H20** Kimbundu languages (?Songo)
- **H30–40** (with Yanzi) Yaka languages

H10 and H40 are sometimes considered Forest Bantu, the others Savanna Bantu.

H10 Kunyi, Suundi, and Vili have been split between B40 and L10. H40 is split between H30 and L10.

Kongo–Yaka may form a family, perhaps with B40 Sira.

=== Zone J ===
Uganda, Rwanda–Burundi, near lakes Kivu & Victoria

- **J** Great Lakes (part of Northeast Bantu)

=== Zone K ===
E Angola, W Zambia

- **K10** Chokwe–Luchazi languages
- **K31** Luyana
- **K30** Kavango languages?
- **K43** Mbukushu

K20 Lozi is now classified as Southern Bantu, specifically Sotho-Tswana. Some K30 languages have been reclassified as Kavango, but Luyana is an independent lineage. K40 Subiya–Totela has been reclassified as Botatwe, apart from Mbukushu, which appears to be an independent lineage.

=== Zone L ===
S DR-Congo, C Zambia

- **L10** (with some H) Pende languages
- **L20–40** +L60 Luba languages (Luluwa)
- **L50** Lunda languages

L20 Songe (apart perhaps from Lwalu), L30 Luba, L40 Kaonde, and L60 Nkoya have been grouped as Luban.

=== Zone M ===
E Zambia, SE DR-Congo

- **M10–30** (with Bungu) Rukwa languages
- **M40–50** (with Senga) Sabi languages
- **M60** (with K40 Subia) Botatwe languages

Sabi–Bobatwe may be related.

=== Zone N ===
Malawi and surrounding areas, C Mozambique, N. Zimbabwe, W. Zambia

- **N20–40** Nyasa languages

N10 Manda has been classified as Rufiji–Ruvuma, and the N20 Tumbuka 'dialect' Senga as Sabi.

=== Zone P ===
NE Mozambique, SE Tanzania

P10 Matuumbi and P20 Yao have been classified as Rufiji–Ruvuma, P15 Mbunga as Kilombero, and P30 Makhuwa.

=== Zone R ===
SW Angola, N Namibia, N Botswana

- R11 Umbundu (South Mbundu)
- **R10–30** Southwest Bantu languages
- **R40** Yeyi

R20 Ovambo, R30 Herero, and R10 apart from Umbundu have been grouped together as Southwest Bantu. Yeyi forms its own lineage.

=== Zone S ===
South Africa, Botswana, Zimbabwe, S. Mozambique.

- **S10** Shona languages
- **S20–60** Southern Bantu languages

== Full list (1948/2009) ==
Following is the original list from Guthrie (1948), with all numerical assignments, as updated by Guthrie himself (1971) and J.F. Maho (2009). The groups are geographic, and do not necessarily imply a relationship between the languages within them. Words in parentheses are added for disambiguation. Numbers in brackets are changes made in Maho (2009); languages in brackets were added by Maho (2009). Languages of the proposed Zone J are included among zones D and E.

=== Zone A ===
A10: A11[101] Londo, A12[101] Barue, A13 Balong, A14 Bonkeng, A15 Mbo, [A141 Bafo, A151 Nkongho, multiple additions to A101 Oroko]
A20: A21 Bomboko, A22 Baakpe, A23 Su, A24 Duala, A25 Oli, A26 Pongo, A27 Mulimba, [A221 Bubia, A231 Kole, additions to A24–26 Duala]
A30: A31a North Bobe, A31b Southwest Bobe, A31c Southeast Bobe, A32a Banoo, A32b Bapoko, A33a Yasa, A33b Kombe, A34 Benga
A40: A41 Lombi, A42 Bankon, A43a Mbene, A43b North Kogo, A43c South Kogo, A44 Banen, A45 Nyokon, A46 Mandi, [A441 Aling'a, A461 Bonek, A462 Yambeta]
A50: A51 Fa’, A52 Kaalong, A53 Kpa, A54 Ngayaba, [A501 Hijuk]
A60: A61[601] Ngoro, A62 Yambasa, A63 Mangisa, A64[601] Bacenga, A65 Bati, [A621 Baca, A622 Gunu, A623 Mbule]
A70: A71 Eton, A72a Ewondo, A72b Mvele, A72c Bakja, A72d Yangafek, A73a Bëbëlë, A73b Gbïgbïl, A74 Bulu, A75 Fang, [A751 South-West Fang]
A80: A81 Mvumbo, A82 So, A83 Makaa, A84 Njem, A85a Konabem, A85b Bekwil, A86a Medjime, A86b Mpompo, A86c Mpiemo, A87 Bomwali, [A801 Gyele, A802 Ukwedjo, A803 Shiwe, A831 Byep, A832 Bekol, A841 Bajue, A842 Koonzime]
A90: A91 Kwakum, A92a Pol, A92b Pomo, A93 Kako

=== Zone B ===
B10: B11a Mpongwe, B11b Rongo, B11c Galwa, B11d Dyumba, B11e Nkomi
B20: B21 Sekiyani, B22a West Kele, B22b Ngom, B22c Bubi, B23 Mbangwe, B24 Wumbvu, B25 Kota, [B201 Ndasa, B202 Sighu, B203 Sama, B204 Ndambomo, B205 Metombola, B221 Molengue, B251 Shake, B252 Mahongwe]
B30: B31 Tsogo, B32 Kande, [B301 Viya, B302 Himbaka, B303 Bongwe, B304 Pinzi, B305 Vove]
B40: B41 Sira, B42 Sangu, B43 Punu, B44 Lumbu, [B401 Bwisi, B402 Varama, B403 Vungu, B404 Ngubi, B411 Bwali]
B50: B51 Duma, B52 Nzebi, B53 Tsaangi, [B501 Wanzi, B502 Mwele, B503 Vili]
B60: B61 Mbete, B62 Mbaama, B63 Nduumo, [B602 Kaning'i, B603 Yangho]
B70: B71a Tege-Kali, B71b Njiningi, B72a Ngungwele, B72b Mpumpu, B73a Tsaayi, B73b Laali, B73c Yaa, B73d Kwe, B74a Ndzindziu, B74b Boma, B75 Bali (Teke), B76a Musieno, B76b Ngee, B77a Kukwa, B77b Fumu, B78 Wuumu, [B701 Tsitsege]
B80: B81 Tiene, B82 Boma, B83 Mfinu, B84a[84] Mpuon, B84b[84] Mpuun, B85a Mbiem, B85b East Yans, B85c Yeei, B85d Ntsuo, B85e Mpur, B86 Di, B87[84] Mbuun, [B821 Mpe, B822 Nunu, B861 Ngul (Ngwi), B862 Lwel, B863 Mpiin, B864 West Ngongo, B865 Nzadi]

=== Zone C ===
C10: C11 Ngondi, C12a Pande, C12b Bogongo, C13 Mbati, C14 Mbomotaba, C15 Bongili, C16 Lobala, [C101 Dibole, C102 Ngando, C103 Kota, C104 Yaka (Aka), C105 Mbenga (?=Aka), C141 Enyele, C142 Bondongo, C143 Mbonzo, C161 Bomboli, C162 Bozaba]
C20: C21 Mboko, C22 Akwa, C23[21] Ngare, C24 Koyo, C25 Mbosi, C26 Kwala, C27 Kuba, [C201 Bwenyi]
C30: C31a Loi, C31b Ngiri, C31c Nunu, C32 Bobangi, C33 Sengele, C34 Sakata, C35a Ntomba, C35b Bolia, C36a Poto, C36b Mpesa, C36c Mbudza, C36d Mangala, C36e Boloki, C36f Kangana, C36g Ndolo, C37 Buja, [C301 Doko, C302 Bolondo, C311 Mabaale, C312 Ndoobo, C313 Litoka, C314 Balobo, C315 Enga, C321 Binza, C322 Dzamba, C323 Mpama, C371 Tembo, C372 Kunda, C373 Gbuta, C374 Babale]
C40: C41 Ngombe, C42 Bwela, C43 Bati, C44 Boa, C45 Angba, [C401 Pagibete, C403 Kango, C411 Bomboma, C412 Bamwe, C413 Dzando, C414 Ligendza, C415 Likula, C441 Bango]
C50: C51 Mbesa, C52 So, C53 Poke, C54 Lombo, C55 Kele, C56 Foma, [C501 Likile, C502 Linga]
C60: C61a Northeast Mongo, C61b Northwest Mongo, C62 Lalia, [C63 Ngando, C611 Bafoto]
C70: C71 Tetela, C72 Kusu, C73 Nkutu, C74 Yela, C75 Kela, C76 Ombo, [C701 Langa]
C80: C81 Dengese, C82 Songomeno, C83 Busoong, C84 Lele, C85 Wongo

=== Zone D ===
D10: D11 Mbole, D12 Lengola, D13 Metoko, D14 Enya, [D141 Zura]
D20: D21 Bali, D22 Amba, D23 Komo, D24 Songola, D25 Lega, D26 Zimba, D27 Bangubangu, D28a West Holoholo, D28b East Holoholo, [D201 Liko, D211 Kango, D251 Lega-Malinga, D281 Tumbwe, D282 Lumbwe]
D30: D31 Peri, D32 Bira, D33 Nyali, [D301 Kari, D302 Guru, D303 Ngbinda, D304 †Homa, D305 Nyanga-li, D306 Gbati-ri, D307 Mayeka, D308 Bodo (CAR), D311 Bila, D312 Kaiku, D313 Ibutu, D331 Bvanuma, D332 Budu, D333 Ndaaka, D334 Mbo, D335 Beeke, D336 Ngbee]
D40: [J]D41 Konzo, [J]D42 Ndandi, D43 Nyanga
D50: [J]D51 Hunde, [J]D52 Haavu, [J]D53 Nyabungu, D54 Bembe, D55 Buyi, [J]D56 Kabwari, [JD501 Nyindu, JD502 Yaka, JD531 Tembo]
[J]D60: D61 Ruanda, D62 Rundi, D63 Fuliiro, D64 Subi, D65 Hangaza, D66 Ha, D67 Vinza, [JD631 Vira]

=== Zone E ===
[J]E10: E11 Nyoro, E12 Tooro, E13 Nyankore, E14 Ciga, E15 Ganda, E16 Soga, E17 Gwere, E18 Nyala, [JE101 Gungu, JE102 Talinga-Bwisi, JE103 Ruli, JE121 Hema]
[J]E20: E21 Nyambo, E22 Ziba, E23 Dzindza, E24 Kerebe, E25 Jita, [JE221 Rashi, JE251 Kwaya, JE252 Kara, JE253 Ruri]
[J]E30: E31a Gisu, E31b Kisu, E31c Bukusu, E32a Hanga, E32b Tsotso, E33 Nyore, E34 Saamia, E35 Nyuli, [JE341 Xaayo, JE342 Marachi, JE343 Songa]
E40: [J]E41 Logooli, [J]E42 Gusii, [J]E43 Koria, [J]E44 Zanaki, [J]E45 Nata, E46 Sonjo, [JE401 Nguruimi, JE402 Ikizu, JE403 Suba/Suba-Simbiti, JE404 Shashi, JE405 Kabwa, JE406 †Singa, JE407 †Ware, JE411 Idaxo, JE412 Isuxa, JE413 Tiriki, JE431 Simbiti, JE432 Hacha, JE433 Surwa, JE434 Sweta]
E50: E51 Gikuyu, E52 Embu, E53 Meru, E54 Saraka, E55 Kamba, E56 Daiso, [E531 Mwimbi-Muthambi, E541 Cuka]
E60: E61[621a] Rwo, E62a[621b,622a] Hai, E62b[622c] Wunjo, E62c[623] Rombo, E63 Rusa, E64 Kahe, E65 Gweno
E70: E71 Pokomo, E72a Gyriama, E72b Kauma, E72c Conyi, E72d Duruma, E72e Rabai, E73 Digo, E74a Dabida, E74b[741] Sagala, [E701 Elwana, E731 Segeju, E732 Degere, E74 Taita]

=== Zone F ===
F10: F11 Tongwe, F12 Bende
F20: F21 Sukuma, F22 Nyamwezi, F23 Sumbwa, F24 Kimbu, F25 Bungu
F30: F31 Nilamba, F32 Remi, F33 Langi, F34 Mbugwe

=== Zone G ===
G10: G11 Gogo, G12 Kaguru
G20: G21 [E74a] Tubeta, G22 Asu, G23 Shambala, G24 Bondei, [G221 Mbugu (Bantu register)]
G30: G31 Zigula, G32 Ngwele, G33 Zaramo, G34 Ngulu, G35 Ruguru, G36 Kami, G37 Kutu, G38 Vidunda, G39 Sagala, [G301 Doe, G311 Mushungulu (incl. Shanbara)]
G40: G41 Tikuu, G42a Amu, G42b Mvita, G42c Mrima, G42d Unguja, G43a Phemba, G43b Tumbatu, G43c Hadimu, G44a Ngazija, G44b Njuani, [G402 Makwe, G403 Mwani, G404 Sidi (India), G411 Socotra Swahili, G412 Mwiini]
G50: G51 Pogolo, G52 Ndamba
G60: G61 Sango, G62 Hehe, G63 Bena, G64 Pangwa, G65 Kinga, G66 Wanji, G67 Kisi, [G651 Magoma]

=== Zone H ===
H10: H11 Beembe, H12 Vili, H13 Kunyi, H14 Ndingi, H15 Mboka, H16a South Kongo, H16b Central Kongo, H16c Yombe, H16d Fiote, H16e Bwende, H16f Laadi, H16g East Kongo, H16h Southeast Kongo, [H111 Hangala, H112 Kamba-Doondo, H131 Suundi]
H20: H21a Kimbundu, H21b Mbamba, H22 Sama, H23 Bolo, H24 Songo
H30: H31 Yaka, H32 Suku, H33 [L12b] Hungu, H34 Mbangala, H35 Sinji, [H321 Soonde]
H40: H41 Mbala, H42 Hunganna

=== Zone K ===
K10: K11 Ciokwe, K12a Luimbi, K12b Ngangela, K13 Lucazi, K14 Lwena, K15 Mbunda, K16 Nyengo, K17 Mbwela, K18 Nkangala
K20: K21 Lozi
K30: K31 Luyana, K32 Mbowe, K33 Kwangali, K34 Mashi, K35 Simaa, K36 Sanjo, K37 Kwangwa, [K321 Mbume, K322 Liyuwa, K332 Manyo, K333 Mbukushu, K334 †Mbogedu, K351 Mulonga, K352 Mwenyi, K353 Koma, K354 Imilangu, K371 Kwandi]
K40: K41 Totela, K42 Subiya, [K402 Fwe, K411 Totela of Namibia]

=== Zone L ===
L10: L11 Pende, L12 Samba & Holu, L13 Kwese, [L101 Sonde§]
L20: L21 Kete, L22 Binji [Mbagani, L23 Songe, L24 Luna, [L201 Budya, L202 Yazi, L221 Lwalwa, L231 Binji]
L30: L31a Luba-Kasai, L31b Lulua, L32 Kanyoka, L33 Luba-Katanga, L34 Hemba, L35 Sanga, [L301 Kebwe, L331 Zeela]
L40: L41 Kaonde
L50: L51 Salampasu, L52 Lunda, L53 Ruund, [L511 Luntu]
L60: L61 Mbwera, L62 Nkoya, [L601 Kolwe, L602 Lushangi, L603 Shasha]

=== Zone M ===
M10: M11 Pimbwe, M12 Rungwa, M13 Fipa, M14 Rungu, M15 Mambwe, [M131 Kuulwe]
M20: M21 Wanda, M22 Mwanga, M23 Nyiha, M24 Malila, M25 Safwa, M26 Iwa, M27 Tambo, [M201 Lambya, M202 Sukwa]
M30: M31 Nyakyusa, [M301 Ndali, M302 Penja]
M40: M41 Taabwa, M42 Bemba, [M401 Bwile, M402 Aushi]
M50: M51 Biisa, M52 Lala, M53 Swaka, M54 Lamba, M55 Seba, [M521 Ambo, M522 Luano, M541 Lima, M542 Temba]
M60: M61 Lenje, M62 Soli, M63 Ila, M64 Tonga, [M611 Lukanga Twa, M631 Sala, M632 Lundwe, M633 Kafue Twa]

=== Zone N ===
N10: N11 Manda, N12 Ngoni, N13 Matengo, N14 Mpoto, N15 Tonga, [N101 Ndendeule, N102 Nindi, N121 Ngoni of Malawi§]
N20: N21 Tumbuka, [N201 Mwera of Mbamba Bay]
N30: N31a Nyanja, N31b Cewa, N31c Manganja
N40: N41 Nsenga, N42 Kunda, N43 Nyungwe, N44 Sena, N45[44] Rue, N46[44] Podzo, [N441 Sena-Malawi]

=== Zone P ===
P10: P11 Ndengereko, P12 Ruihi, P13 Matumbi, P14 Ngindo, P15 Mbunga
P20: P21 Yao, P22 Mwera, P23 Makonde, P24 Ndonde, P25 Mabiha
P30: P31 Makua, P32 Lomwe, P33 Ngulu, P34 Cuabo, [P311 Koti, P312 Sakati, P331 Lomwe of Malawi, P341 Moniga]

=== Zone R ===
R10: R11 Umbundu, R12 Ndombe, R13 Nyaneka, R14 Khumbi, [R101 Kuvale, R102 †Kwisi, R103 Mbali]
R20: R21 Kwanyama, R22 Ndonga, R23 Kwambi, R24 Ngandyera, [R211 Kafima, R212 Evale, R213 Mbandja, R214 Mbalanhu, R215 Ndongwena, R216 Kwankwa, R217 Dombondola, R218 Esinga, R241 Kwaluudhi, R242 Kolonkadhi-Eunda]
R30: R31 Herero, [R311 North-West Herero, R312 Botswana Herero]
R40: R41 Yei

=== Zone S ===
S10: S11 Korekore, S12 Zezuru, S13a Manyika, S13b Tebe, S14 Karanga, S15 Ndau, S16 Kalanga
S20: S21 Venda
S30: S31a Tswana, S31b Kgatla, S31c Ngwatu, S31d[311] Khalaxadi, S32a Pedi, S32b Lobedu, S33 Sotho, [S301 Phalaborwa, S302 Kutswe, S303 Pai, S304 Pulana]
S40: S41 Xhosa, S42 Zulu, S43 Swati, S44 (Northern) Ndebele, [S401 †Old Mfengu, S402 Bhaca, S403 Hlubi, S404 Phuthi, S405 Nhlangwini, S406 †Lala, S407 South Ndebele, S408 Sumayela Ndebele]
S50: S51 Tswa, S52[53] Gwamba, S53 Tsonga, S54 Ronga, [S511 Hlengwe]
S60: S61 Copi, S62 Tonga, [S611 Lenge]

§: These languages do not have separate articles, though they might warrant them.

=== 2009 appendix ===
Besides the languages added within the existing framework above, Maho appends several creoles, pidgins, and mixed languages:

- Duala-based: A20A Jo
- Beti-based: A70A Ewondo Populaire
- Bangi-based: C30A Bangala, C30B Lingala
- Shabunda-based: D20A Gengele
- Amba-based: D20B †Vamba
- Pare-based: G20A Ma’a (mixed register)
- Swahili-based: G40A Asian Swahili, G40B Cutchi-Swahili, G40C Kisetla, G40D Engsh, G40E Sheng, G40F Shaba Swahili, G40G Ngwana (Congo Swahili), G40H KiKAR
- Kongo-based: H10A Kituba, H10B Munukutuba, H10C Habla Congo (in Cuba)
- Nkore-Kiga-based: JE10A Runyakitara (artificial)
- Luba-based: L30A Pidgin Chiluba
- Bemba-based: M40A Town Bemba
- Kunda-based: N40A †Pidgin Chikunda
- Sotho-based: S30A Pretoria Sotho
- Zulu-based: S40A Fanagalo, S40B Iscamtho§, S40C †Shalambombo§
- Tsonga-based: S50A Pretoria-Tsonga§

§: These languages did not have separate articles at the last review by a Wikipedia editor.

== See also ==
- List of Bantu languages
