= Lia-Ntomba language =

Bantu language spoken in DR Congo

Ntomba
- Bolia, Lia
- Native to: Democratic Republic of the Congo
- Region: Lake Tumba, Lake Mai-Ndombe
- Native speakers: (100,000 Ntomba cited 1980); 100,000 Lia (2000)
- Language family: Niger–Congo?: Atlantic–Congo; Benue–Congo; Bantoid; Bantu (Zone C); Bangi–Ntomba (C.30); Mongo; Ntomba

Language codes
- ISO 639-3: Either: nto – Ntomba bli – Bolia
- Glottolog: boli1263
- Guthrie code: C.35

Ntomba and Lia (Bolia) are closely related Bantu languages of the Democratic Republic of the Congo, close enough to be considered dialects of a single Lia-Ntomba language.

The related Mongo language also has varieties called Ntomba or Ntumba.
