= Kwaʼ language =

Bamileke language of Cameroon

Kwaʼ
- Region: Cameroon
- Ethnicity: Bamileke
- Native speakers: (1,000 cited 2000)
- Language family: Niger–Congo?: Atlantic–Congo; Volta-Congo; Benue–Congo; Bantoid; Southern Bantoid; Grassfields; Eastern Grassfields; Mbam-Nkam; Bamileke; Kwaʼ

Language codes
- ISO 639-3: bko
- Glottolog: kwaa1265

Kwaʼ (Bakwa) is a minor Bamileke language of Cameroon.

== Phonology ==
=== Consonants ===
Consonants
		Bilabial	Labio-dental	Alveolar	Post-alveolar	Palatal	Velar	Glottal	Labial-velar
Plosive	voiceless			t			k	ʔ	
Plosive	voiced	b		d			g		
Plosive	prenasalized	ᵐb		ⁿd	ᶮdʒ		ᵑg		
Nasal		m		n		ɲ	ŋ		
Affricate	voiceless		pf		tʃ		kx		
Affricate	voiced		bv		dʒ				
Fricative	voiceless		f	s				h	
Fricative	voiced		v				ɣ		
Lateral				l					
Approximant						j			w

This analysis differs from that of Tientcheu Tchameni (2008), who did not find /ʔ/, /pf/, /bv/, or /ɣ/. In contrast, Tientcheu Tchameni (2008) found /p/, /gɣ/, /ɰ/, /kf/, and /x/, which Talla Sandeu did not.

=== Vowels ===
Vowels
	Front				Central		Back	
	[-round]		[+round]		Central		Back	
	short	long	short	long	short	long	short	long
Close	i				ʉ	ʉː	u	uː
Close-mid	e	eː	ø	øː	ə	əː		
Open-mid	ɛ				ə	əː	ɔ	ɔː
Open					a	aː		

Tientcheu Tchameni (2008) did not include /ə/ or /əː/ but did include /ɨ/, /o/, and /ɛː/.

=== Tones ===
Talla Sandeu (2020) and Tientcheu Tchameni (2008) agree on the number and characteristics of the tones. There are three simple tones (high, mid, and low) and two complex tones (rising and falling). Syllabic nasals can only carry simple tones, e.g., [m̀fū] 'leaf'.
