= Bala language =

Bantu language spoken in DR Congo

Bala
- Lobala
- Native to: Democratic Republic of the Congo
- Native speakers: (60,000 Lobala cited 2000); 21,000 Boko (no date)
- Language family: Niger–Congo?: Atlantic–Congo; Benue–Congo; Bantoid; Bantu (Zone C.10); Ngondi–Ngiri; Bala

Language codes
- ISO 639-3: Either: loq – Lobala bkp – Iboko
- Glottolog: loba1239 Lobala boko1263 Boko
- Guthrie code: C16

Bala (Lobala) is a Bantu language of the Democratic Republic of the Congo. According to Maho (2009), it includes Boko (Iboko).

== Distribution and status ==
Bala is spoken in the northwest corner of the Democratic Republic of the Congo west of the Congo River by about 60,000 people. Most of these are not monolingual, but the language is being passed on to the next generation, especially in more remote areas. Ethnologue classifies the language as "vigorous", meaning that it is sustainable.

There are four dialects of Bala: Likoka, Poko (Iboko), South Lobala, and Tanda.

== Negation ==
Like many languages in the Benue-Congo group, Bala forms negatives by adding an affix to the verbal phrase. However, Bala is unusual in that it adds two affixes to form negatives. These are added as a prefix and a suffix to the subject affix. For example,

ba-tub-aka

They sang

te-ba-ik-aka tuba

They did not sing

Here the te and the ik elements are the double affixes indicating negation, attached to the ba affix indicating third party plural. The tub element is the verb "to sing" and the aka affix indicates the past tense.

moto me t-a-iká mo-phé ná baphalnágà ná ntóma

The man didn't give him money or food

In a similar way the t and iká negation elements are affixed to the verbal affix element a (indicating third person singular).
