= Bongili language =

Bantu language of the Republic of Congo

Bongili
- Native to: Republic of Congo
- Native speakers: 12,000 (2018)
- Language family: Niger–Congo?: Atlantic–Congo; Benue–Congo; Bantoid; Bantu (Zone C.10); Ngondi–Ngiri; Bongili

Language codes
- ISO 639-3: bui
- Glottolog: bong1284
- Guthrie code: C15

Bongili is a Bantu language of the Republic of Congo.
