= Bafaw-Balong language =

Bantu language spoken in Cameroon

Bafaw
- Balong
- Native to: Cameroon
- Ethnicity: Bafaw, Balong
- Native speakers: (8,400 cited 1982)
- Language family: Niger–Congo?: Atlantic–Congo; Benue–Congo; Bantoid; Bantu (Zone A.10); perhaps Sawabantu?; Bafo–Bonkeng; Bafaw
- Dialects: Fo’ (Bafaw); Long (Balong)

Language codes
- ISO 639-3: bwt
- Glottolog: bafa1247
- Guthrie code: A.13,141

Bafaw-Balong is a Bantu language of Cameroon. There are two divergent varieties, Fo’ (Bafaw, Bafo, Bafowu, Afo, Nho, Lefo’) and Long (Balong, Balon, Balung, Nlong, Valongi, Bayi, Bai), which are sometimes considered distinct languages.

The Bafaw and Balong people are two of several who call themselves Ngoe as they share a legendary origin with speakers of the Ngoe languages, but their language is not part of that group.
