= Ngondi language =

Bantu language of the Republic of Congo

Ngondi
- Ingundi
- Native to: Republic of Congo
- Native speakers: 3,000 (2004)
- Language family: Niger–Congo?: Atlantic–Congo; Benue–Congo; Bantoid; Bantu (Zone C.10); Ngondi–Ngiri; Ngondi

Language codes
- ISO 639-3: ndn
- Glottolog: ngun1270
- Guthrie code: C.11

Ngondi (Ingundi) is a Bantu language of the Republic of Congo.
