= Bonkeng language =

Bantu language of Cameroon

Bonkeng
- Native to: Cameroon
- Native speakers: (3,000 cited 2000)
- Language family: Niger–Congo?: Atlantic–Congo; Benue–Congo; Bantoid; Bantu (Zone A.10); perhaps Sawabantu?; Bafo–Bonkeng; Bonkeng

Language codes
- ISO 639-3: bvg
- Glottolog: bonk1243
- Guthrie code: A.14

Bonkeng is a poorly known Bantu language of Cameroon.
