= Lake Télé Community Reserve =

Protected area in the Republic of the Congo

Lac Télé Community Reserve
- Location within Republic of the Congo
- Nearest city: Mbandaka
- Coordinates: 1°20′51″N 17°09′15″E
- Area: 4,389 square kilometres (1,695 sq mi)
- Established: 10 May 2001

Ramsar Wetland
- Official name: Lac Télé / Likouala-aux-herbes
- Designated: 18 June 1998
- Reference no.: 950

The Lake Télé Community Reserve is a protected area in the Republic of the Congo.

== History ==
The reserve was established on the 10 May 2001. In August 2010, the Cooperation Agreement between the governments of the Republic of the Congo and the Democratic Republic of the Congo (DRC) on the Lake Tele - Lake Tumba landscape provided for creation of a trans-national protected area including the Lake Télé Community Reserve and the Ngiri-Tumba-Maindombe area in the DRC.

== Geography and environment ==
The reserve is a huge area of inaccessible swamp forest, with no roads. Ite covers 4,389 square kilometres (1,695 sq mi) around Lake Télé. The soil under the reserve contains major stores of peat which is rich in carbon. This discovery makes conservation of the area even more crucial, as if disturbed the carbon could escape into the atmosphere exacerbating global warming. In light of this discovery, the Wildlife Conservation Society advocated expansion of the reserve.

=== Wildlife ===
In 2006 and 2007 researchers from the US-based Wildlife Conservation Society investigated the region, finding evidence of an estimated population of 125,000 Western lowland gorillas. This was more than the current estimated total population of the species. The park has been designated an Important Bird Area (IBA) by BirdLife International because it supports significant populations of many bird species.
