= Bhele language =

Bantu language in the Congo

Bhele
- Piri
- Native to: DR Congo
- Native speakers: (15,000 cited 1989)
- Language family: Niger–Congo?: Atlantic–Congo; Benue–Congo; Bantoid; Bantu (Zone D.20–30); Boan; Bomokandian; Biran; Bhele

Language codes
- ISO 639-3: bhy
- Glottolog: bhel1238
- Guthrie code: D.31

Bhele (Ebhele), or Piri (Kipiri), is a Bantu language of the Democratic Republic of the Congo.
