= Bamwe language =

Bantu language of the Democratic Republic of the Congo

Bamwe
- Native to: DR Congo
- Native speakers: (20,000 cited 1983 census)
- Language family: Niger–Congo?: Atlantic–Congo; Benue–Congo; Bantoid; Bantu (Zone C.40); Buja–Ngombe; Bamwe

Language codes
- ISO 639-3: bmg
- Glottolog: bamw1238
- Guthrie code: C412

Bamwe is a Bantu language of the Democratic Republic of the Congo.
