= Bomboma language =

Language

Bomboma
- Native to: DR Congo
- Native speakers: (23,000 cited 1983 census)
- Language family: Niger–Congo?: Atlantic–Congo; Benue–Congo; Bantoid; Bantu (Zone C.40); Buja–Ngombe; Bomboma

Language codes
- ISO 639-3: bws
- Glottolog: bomb1262
- Guthrie code: C411

Bomboma (Mboma) is a Bantu language of the Democratic Republic of Congo.
