= Bole language (Bantu) =

Bantu language spoken in Congo Republic

Bole
- Dibole
- Native to: Republic of Congo
- Ethnicity: Babole
- Native speakers: 4,000, incl. 800 monolinguals (2004)
- Language family: Niger–Congo?: Atlantic–Congo; Benue–Congo; Bantoid; Bantu (Zone C.10); Ngondi–Ngiri; Bole
- Dialects: Dzeke; Kinami; Bouanila
- Writing system: Latin

Language codes
- ISO 639-3: bvx
- Glottolog: dibo1245
- Guthrie code: C101
- ELP: Dibole

Bole, also known as Dibole or Babole, is a Bantu language spoken in the Likouala Department in the Republic of Congo. Speakers are clustered in villages on the Likouala-aux-Herbes river, south of Epena.
