= Bomboli–Bozaba language =

Bantu language of DR Congo

Bomboli–Bozaba
- Native to: Democratic Republic of the Congo
- Native speakers: (8,000 cited 1983–1986)
- Language family: Niger–Congo?: Atlantic–Congo; Benue–Congo; Bantoid; Bantu (Zone C.10); Ngondi–Ngiri; Bomboli–Bozaba

Language codes
- ISO 639-3: Either: bml – Bomboli bzo – Bozaba
- Glottolog: bomb1261
- Guthrie code: C161, C162
- ELP: Bomboli; Bomboli

Bomboli (also Bombongo) and Bozaba constitute a Bantu language of the Democratic Republic of the Congo. Bomboli is spoken in the towns of Kungu and Dongo in the Sud-Ubangi province, specifically on a canal flowing into Ngiri river, north of Bomongo. Bozaba is spoken northwest of the confluence of the Ngiri and Mwanda rivers, in Kungu territory, Mwanda collectivité.
