= Barikanchi pidgin =

Hausa-based pidgin of Nigeria

Barikanci
- Native to: Nigeria
- Native speakers: None
- Language family: Hausa-based pidgin

Language codes
- ISO 639-3: bxo
- Glottolog: bari1241
- ELP: Barikanchi

Barikanchi pidgin, Barikanci, or Bastard Hausa is a pidgin of the Hausa language spoken in Nigeria. Barikanci is used by the Nigerian Armed Forces to ensure clear communication between the linguistically diverse members of the military.

In the Nigerian military, the majority of members are from the northern part of the country. This led to the Hausa language being the lingua franca, paving the way for pidgin Hausa, also known as hausan bariki. The language developed in the British Army barracks of northern Nigeria in the first part of the 20th century, and was used as a lingua franca among Nigerians of diverse linguistic backgrounds.

Being a military language, Barikanci is principally spoken in military barracks—"Barikanci" is derived from the word bariki, which means barracks.

== See also ==
- Gibanawa, another Hausa-based pidgin.
