= Budza language =

Bantu language spoken in DR Congo

Budza
- Buja
- Native to: DR Congo
- Native speakers: (230,000 cited 1985 census)
- Language family: Niger–Congo?: Atlantic–Congo; Benue–Congo; Bantoid; Bantu (Zone C.40); Buja–Ngombe; Budza
- Dialects: Budza; Tembo; Kunda; Gbuta; Babale

Language codes
- ISO 639-3: Either: bja – Budza tmv – Tembo
- Glottolog: budj1234 Bujaic temb1272 Motembo-Kunda
- Guthrie code: C.37

Budza or Buja (Embudja, Limbudza) is a Bantu language of the Democratic Republic of the Congo.

There are several neighbouring minor languages which Maho (2009) lists as closely related: C371 Tembo (Litembo or Motembo – distinguish Chitembo/Kitembo), C372 Kunda (Likunda – distinguish Chikunda), C373 Gbuta (Egbuta) and C374 Babale. Only Tembo, with 5,000 speakers, has been assigned a separate ISO code; Glottolog concludes that it and Kunda are a single language, distinct from Budza, Gbuta and Bango.

== Phonology ==
Consonants
	Labial	Alveolar	Palatal	Velar	Labiovelar	Glottal
Plosive	p b	t d	tʃ dʒ	k g	kp gb	
Prenasalized	ᵐb	ⁿd	ⁿdʒ	ᵑg	ᵑgb	
Fricative		s				h
Nasal	m	n				
Approximant	w	l	j			

Vowels
	Front	Central	Back
High	i		u
Mid-high	e		o
Mid-low	ɛ		ɔ
Low		a	

Budza distinguishes between high tone and low tone.
