= Pende people =

Ethnic group in the DR Congo

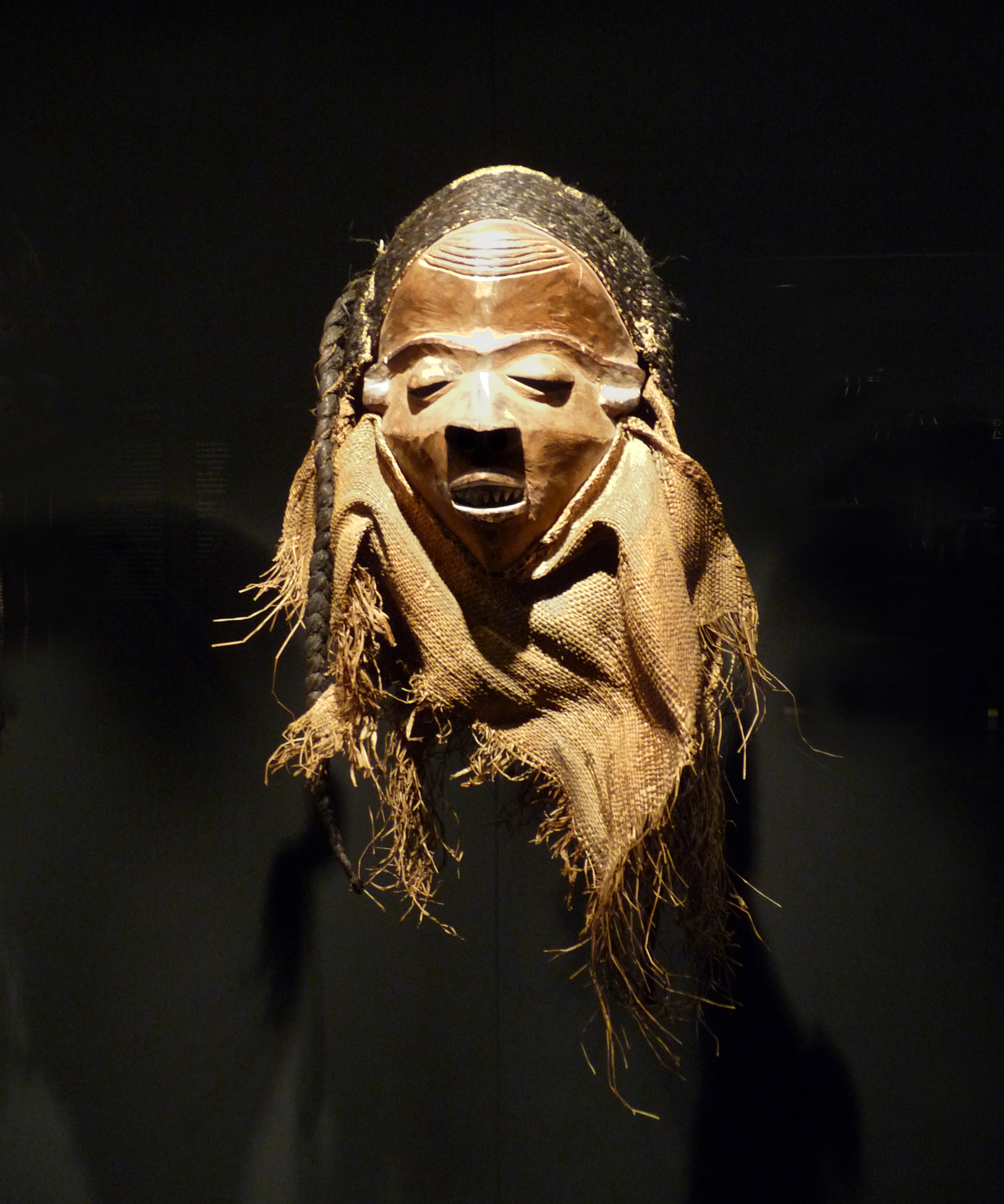
- Pende mask in the Ethnological Museum of Berlin

Total population
- c. 250,000

Languages
- Giphende, French, Tshiluba

Religion
- Christianity • Bantu religion

- Person: Mupende
- People: Bapende, Bapindi
- Language: Kipende, Kipindi

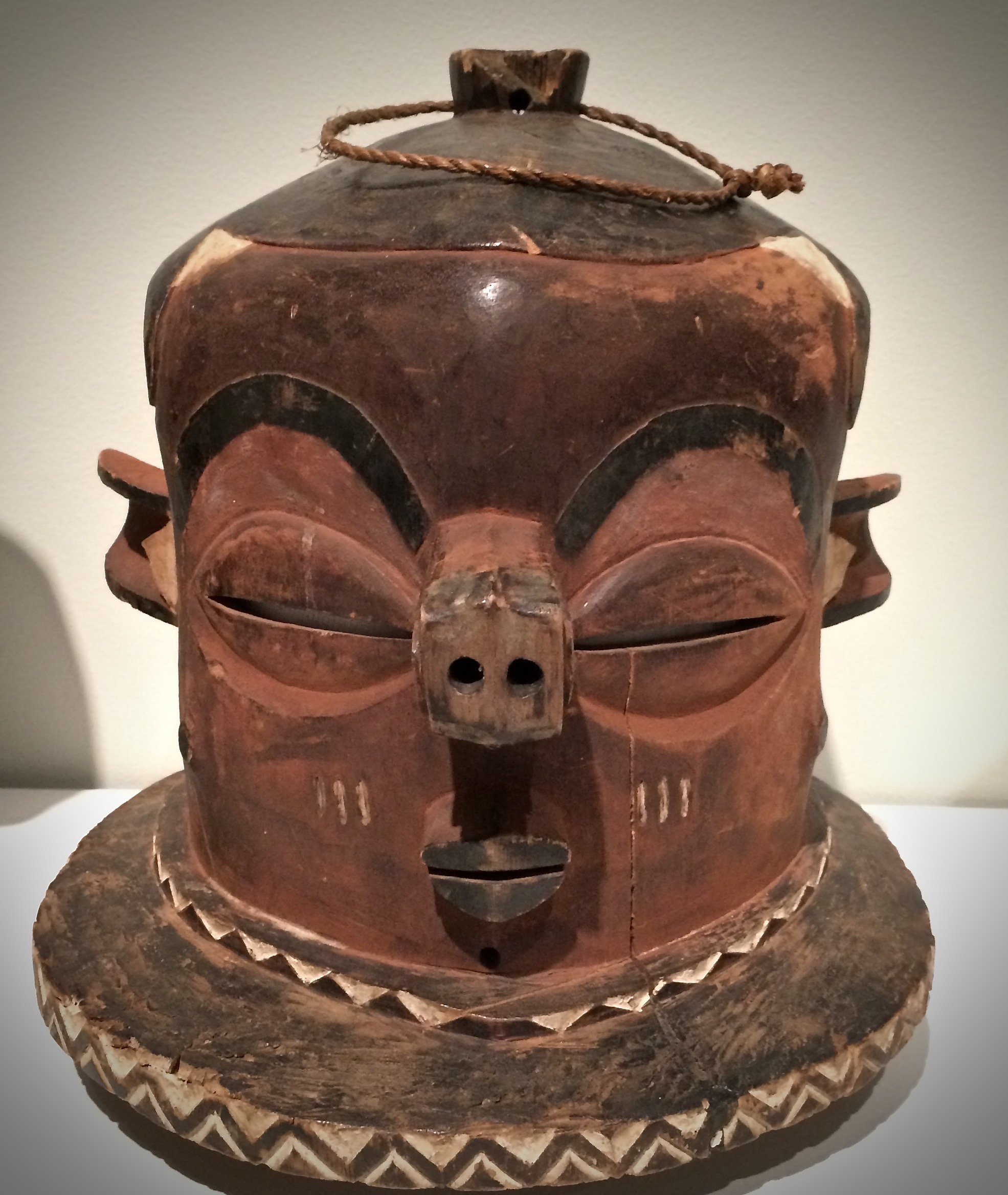
Kipoko mask, Eastern Pende, West Kasai, Congo. On display at Cantor Art Center, Stanford.

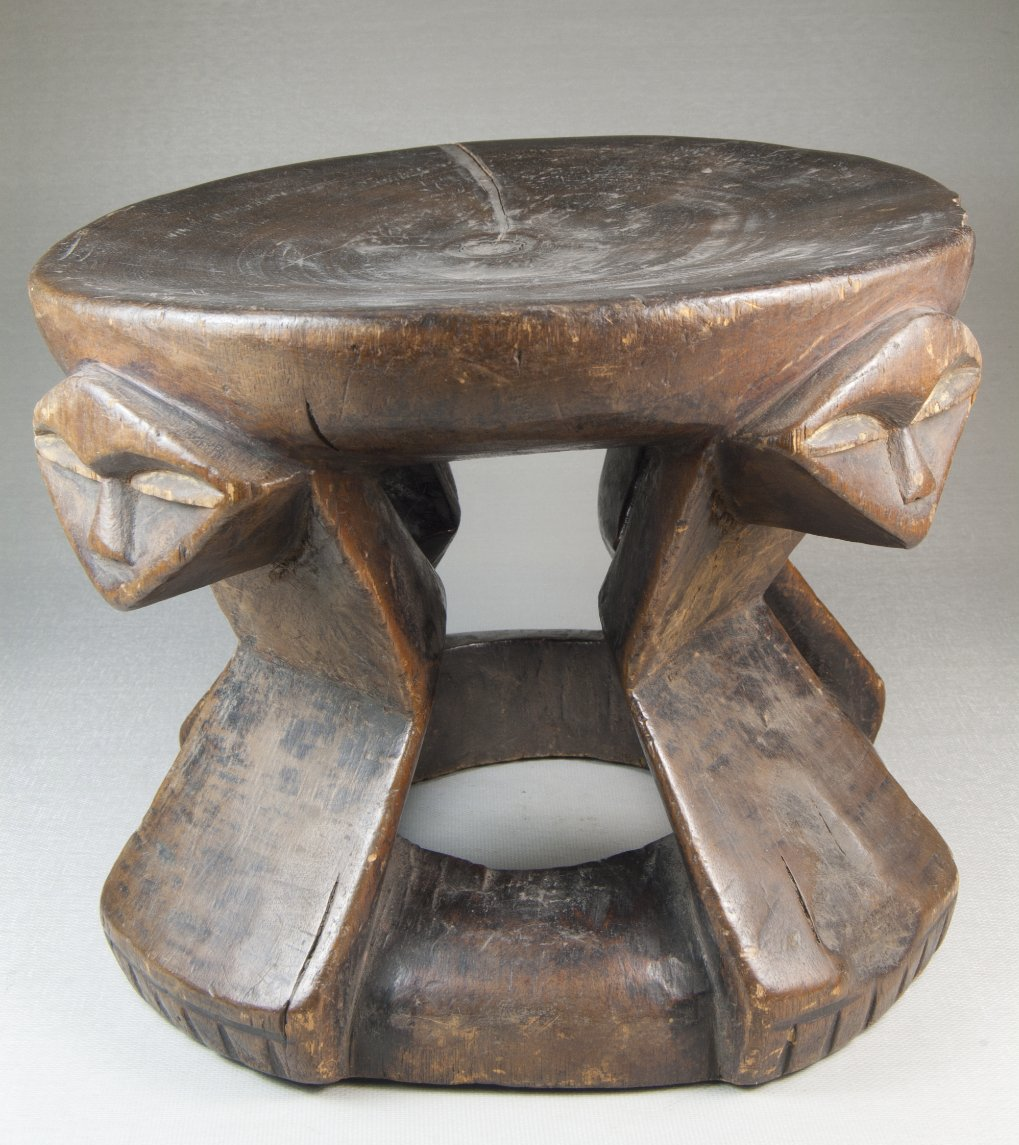
Stool with "Caryatid" Figures. Brooklyn Museum 22.1389

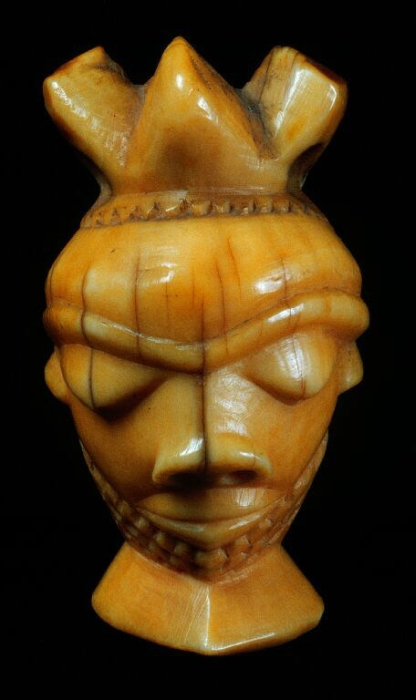
Ivory miniature carved in the form of a mask. Tropenmuseum.

The Pende people (singular: Mupende; plural: Bapende, Bapindi) also known as the Phende people, are an ethnic group in the Democratic Republic of the Congo. The Pende are divided into two cultural groups: the Eastern Pende and the Western Pende who are distinct but consider themselves part of the same ethnic group. The number of people who consider themselves to be ethnically Pende is estimated at over 250,000.

The Pende speak their own language (Giphende) and are particularly known for their artistic works. They are considered to be culturally similar to the Yaka and Suku peoples who live in neighboring areas.

== History ==
The Pende are divided into two distinct cultural groups: the Western Pende and the Eastern Pende. However, both groups see themselves as part of the same ethnic group. There is no centralised political authority and Pende society is organised around extended family groups rather than through a King or chiefly authority.

Much like the Yaka and Suku peoples, the Pende originally lived in the strip between the Atlantic Ocean and the Cuanza River, in modern-day Angola. Pende consider themselves to be the founder of Angola. Pende, wherever they live, have songs portraying the reasons of their departure from Angola to the DRCongo. Most importantly, after the death of their strong Queen NZINGA (Queen Nzinga of Ndongo and Matamba). Pende and Ambundu in Angola are same tribe; the group that migrated to Congo, DRC was named 'tupenzu-tupenzu,' that is where the name Phende. They migrated to their current region of the modern-day Democratic Republic of the Congo in around 1620 as a consequence of the expansion of the Kingdom of Lunda. In around 1885, the powerful Chokwe ethnic group began expanding and gained control over the Eastern Pende but this period was brought to an end by the arrival of European colonists and the creation of the Congo Free State.

Between May and September 1931, the Pende revolted against Belgian colonial rule in Kwilu. The revolt was quickly suppressed by the colonial authorities but was one of the largest revolts in the Congo during the Interwar period.

== Culture ==
The Pende have a matrilineal culture and family kinship plays an important role in structuring social relations. They traditionally practice a form of ancestor worship in which the ancestors (Mvumbi) are believed to affect prospects of success and failure in everyday life.

The Pende traditionally speak their own language, known as Kipende, which is part of the Central Bantu group. The Pende are particularly known for their art, which is complex and includes traditional masks, associated with initiation rituals. Artists play an important role in society, they are looked at as just as important as nobles and receive a gift of having the first portion of food from the harvest. This privilege is usually only reserved for clan chiefs.
