= Sonde language =

Bantu languages spoken in DRC

Sonde
- Kisoonde
- Native to: Democratic Republic of the Congo
- Native speakers: 96,000 (2002) (including Sonde L.101 below)
- Language family: Niger–Congo?: Atlantic–Congo; Benue–Congo; Bantoid; Bantu (Zone H); Yaka languages (H.30); Suku–Sonde; Sonde

Language codes
- ISO 639-3: shc (includes Sonde L.101 below)
- Glottolog: sond1250
- Guthrie code: H.321

Sonde
- (no distinct name known)
- Native to: Democratic Republic of Congo
- Language family: Niger–Congo?: Atlantic–Congo; Benue–Congo; Bantoid; Bantu (Zone L); Holu–Pende (L.10); Sonde

Language codes
- ISO 639-3: shc (included in Sonde H.321 above)
- Glottolog: sond1250
- Guthrie code: L.101

Sonde is either of two Bantu languages of the Democratic Republic of the Congo. Maho (2009) classifies Sonde–Kisoonde as closest to Suku, but lists an adjacent language also called Sonde as closer to Pende. These are not distinguished in Ethnologue or by ISO code.
