= Kwese =

Kwese may be,

- Kwese language
- Kwesé Sports
