= H35 =

H35 may refer to:

== Vehicles ==
- Hanriot H.35, a French training aircraft
- HMS Hunter (H35), a Royal Navy H-class destroyer
- Hotchkiss H35, a French tank
- McDonnell H-35, an American experimental gyrodyne

== Other uses ==
- Clarksville Municipal Airport, in Johnson County, Arkansas, United States
- Shinji language, a Bantu language of the Democratic Republic of the Congo
- H35, a hydrogen station fueling standard
- Tiger Lake-H35, an Intel Tiger Lake mobile processor
