= Holu language =

Bantu language spoken in Angola and DRC

Holu
- Kiholo
- Native to: Angola, Democratic Republic of Congo
- Native speakers: (32,000 cited ca. 2000) (including Hungu?)
- Language family: Niger–Congo?: Atlantic–Congo; Benue–Congo; Bantoid; Bantu (Zone L); Holu–Pende (L.10); Holu
- Dialects: Holu; Yeci; Samba; Hungu

Language codes
- ISO 639-3: Variously: hol – Holu, Yeci smx – Samba hng – Hungu
- Glottolog: holu1245 Holu samb1309 Samba hung1280 Hungu-Pombo
- Guthrie code: L.12 (H.33)

Holo is a Bantu language of Angola and the Democratic Republic of Congo. Yeci, Samba or Hungu may be separate languages.
