= Hungana language =

Language

Hungana
- Native to: Democratic Republic of the Congo
- Region: Bandundu province
- Native speakers: (undated figure of 400)
- Language family: Niger–Congo?: Atlantic–Congo; Benue–Congo; Bantoid; Bantu (Zone H); Yaka languages; Hungana

Language codes
- ISO 639-3: hum
- Glottolog: hung1278
- Guthrie code: H.42

Hungana is an endangered Bantu language of the Democratic Republic of the Congo.
