= Yaka languages =

Group of Bantu languages

Yaka
- Linguistic classification: Niger–Congo?: Atlantic–Congo; Volta-Congo; Benue–Congo; Bantoid; Southern Bantoid; Bantu (Zone H.30); Kongo-Yaka; Yaka

Language codes
- Glottolog: yaka1278 partial match

The Yaka languages are a clade of Bantu languages coded Zone H.30 in Guthrie's classification. According to Nurse & Philippson (2003), with a couple additions the languages form a valid node. They are:

Yaka, Suku–Sonde, Mbangala, Shinji (Yungo), (H40) Hungana, (B80) Yansi (a variety or varieties)

The Yaka languages appear to be closest to Kongo.
