= Pende languages =

Pende
- Holu
- Linguistic classification: Niger–Congo?: Atlantic–Congo; Benue–Congo; Southern Bantoid; Bantu (Zone L.10); Pende

Language codes
- ISO 639-3: –
- Glottolog: mbal1259

The Pende or Holu languages are a clade of Bantu languages coded Zone L.10 in Guthrie's classification. According to Nurse & Philippson (2003), they form a valid node together with a couple languages from Zone H:

(L10) Pende, Samba–Holu, Kwese, (H10) Suundi, (H40) Mbala

Maho (2009) adds Sonde to L10.
