= Mbala language =

Bantu language of the Congo

Mbala
- Native to: Democratic Republic of Congo
- Region: Bandundu Province
- Native speakers: (200,000 cited 1972)
- Language family: Niger–Congo?: Atlantic–Congo; Benue–Congo; Bantoid; Bantu (Zone L); Holu–Pende (L.10) (formerly H.40); Mbala

Language codes
- ISO 639-3: mdp
- Glottolog: mbal1257
- Guthrie code: H.41

Mbala (Gimbala, Rumbala) is a Bantu language of the Congo. It is widely spoken in the area around the town of Kikwit.
