= Yansi language =

Bantu language spoken in Congo

Yansi
- Eyansi
- Native to: DR Congo
- Native speakers: (100,000 cited 1997)
- Language family: Niger–Congo?: Atlantic–Congo; Benue–Congo; Bantoid; Bantu (Zone B); some Yaka (H.30) some Boma–Dzing (B.80); Yansi
- Dialects: Yans proper; Mbiem; Yeei; Mpur

Language codes
- ISO 639-3: yns
- Glottolog: yans1239 Yansi
- Guthrie code: B.85

Yans (Yanzi) is a Bantu language spoken in the Democratic Republic of the Congo by the Bayanzi.

There are six language varieties Guthrie classified as Bantu B.85 (Yans):

- B.85A Mbiem, West Yansi
- B.85B East Yans
- B.85C Yeei
- B.85D Tsong (Itsong, Nsong, Ntsuo, "Songo")
- B.85E Mpur (Mput)
- B.85F Tsambaan

According to Nurse (2003), most belong to the Yaka languages, but one or two are among the Boma–Dzing languages. Maho (2009) notes that the Tsong variety is the then-unclassified "Songo" language (ISO [soo]) of Ethnologue and is the one that does not belong with the rest. Glottolog likewise classifies "Nsong-Mpiin" [soo] apart from Yansi.

== Phonology ==
Most of dialects have these sounds:

=== Consonants ===
		Labial	Alveolar	Palatal	Velar	Labio- velar
Nasal		m	n	(ɲ)	ŋ	
Plosive	voiceless	p ᵐp	t ⁿt	(c) (ᶮc)	k ᵑk	
Plosive	voiced	b ᵐp	d ⁿt	(ɟ) (ᶮɟ)	ɡ ᵑɡ	
Fricative	voiceless	f ᵐf v	s ⁿs t͡s ⁿt͡s			
Fricative	voiced		z ⁿz			
Rhotic			ɾ			
Lateral			l			
Approximant				j		w

=== Vowels ===
	Front	Central	Back
Close	i iː	ɨ ɨː	u uː
Close-mid	e eː	ə əː	o oː
Open-mid	ɛ ɛː	ɜ ɜː	ɔ ɔː
Open	a	ɐ ɐː	ɑ ɑː
