= Tsong language =

Bantu language of the western DR Congo

Tsong
- Nsong, Ntsuo
- Itsong
- Native to: Democratic Republic of the Congo
- Native speakers: 7,100 (2008)
- Language family: Niger–Congo?: Atlantic–Congo; Benue–Congo; Bantoid; Bantu (Zone B); Boma–Dzing (B.80); Tsong
- Dialects: Mpiin

Language codes
- ISO 639-3: soo
- Glottolog: song1299
- Guthrie code: B.85D
- ELP: Nsong

Tsong or Nsong (ISO "Songo") is a Bantu language of the Democratic Republic of the Congo. It was once misclassified as a dialect of Yansi.

== See also ==
- Yansi language
