= Pende revolt =

1931 anti-colonial uprising in the Belgian Congo

Date	May – September 1931
Location	Present-day Kwilu Province, Democratic Republic of the Congo
Result	Revolt suppressed

Belligerents
Belgian Congo	Pende people

Units involved
75 men	200 men

Between May and September 1931, the Pende people revolted against Belgian colonial rule in Kwilu. The revolt was quickly suppressed by the colonial authorities but was one of the largest revolts in the Congo during the Interwar period.

== Causes ==
A report by Omer Dewilliamort discusses a number of causes of the revolt. The head tax and the supplementary tax, which were used as legal justification for forced labour in the Congo, had been significantly increased. One of the ways the Congolese were forced to earn money to pay the head tax with was by picking palm fruit, and the price for 30 kilos of fruit had been lowered from 2.5 francs to only one franc. To pay the new supplementary tax, a man with two wives had to cut 2.5 tonnes of fruit. Additionally, the Pende people often faced difficulties in getting paid at all when they delivered fruit. Industrialists' representatives had been committing various thefts and abuses. Perks customarily paid to chiefs had been suppressed. In the Yongo chefferie, where people were required by the State to grow food crops, the HCB failed to buy up the bulk of these food crops.

== Revolt ==
The origins of the revolt began with recruitment efforts on behalf of the Huileries du Congo Belge (HCB), a subsidiary of Lever Brothers, ancestor of the actual Unilever. A territorial agent named Edouard Burnotte was working with a company recruiter, Alphonse Vanhombeek, as well as some messengers. They began their efforts on 14 May. Burnotte and Vanhombeek had little success at first, because the men hid in the bush. In response, Burnotte ordered messengers accompanying him to arrest the women and shut them up in a barn. Also on 14 May, 47 men were lashed in Kilamba for having failed to deliver their palm fruit quota to a Compagnie du Kasi (CK) oil mill in Bangi. Bangi was in Kwkwit territoire, 20 minutes away from Kilamba. On the evening of 14 May, Vanhombeek and Burnotte became drunk, and had some of the women shut in the barn brought to them. They then had a long orgy, presumably without the consent of the women. Collignon, one of the men also present at the orgy, later went to Kilamba. There he was jostled by Africans who were upset that he had not provided compensation to a woman named Kafushi, whom he had dallied with and presumably raped, and also according to some, because he had taken chickens without paying for them. Matemo attempted to claim the payment owed to his wife, Kafushi, in accordance to African custom. Collignon slapped Matemo and had him beaten by servants and workers at the oil mill. Colignon lodged a complaint against Matemo, and the territorial administrator, Leonard Vaninthout, sent territorial agent Maximilien Balot to investigate. Balot, accompanied by a soldier and four messengers, encountered a hostile crowd led by Matemo on 8 June. Balot attempted to disperse the crowd by firing a number of shots in the air. When this failed, Balot shot someone in the arm with a hunting rifle. After this Matemo charged at Balot, struck him in the head with a knife, chased him into a bush, and finished him off.

A letter written by administrator Gustave Weekx on 30 May from Pukusu states: "The openly anti-European movement is characterised by a total cessation of economic activity. For several days now, not a single crate of fruit has been delivered to the [Portuguese] firm of Madail de Banza." Weekx also tells about an armed conflict he was part of the day before in Kisenzele. Weekx was accompanied by four soldiers and a driver. He noticed a large group of around 200 men, who were intoning battle cries. When he came within 75 metres, Weekx and his escorts were attacked with arrows. Weekx ordered his troops to open fire, and after some of the Pende had been wounded, they fled. Weekx recommended the whole of the southern region of the Lutshima to be placed under military occupation.

On 3 June District Commissioner Vanderhallen dispatched two platoons (75 men) to carry out the requested occupation. On 6 June Commissioner General Constant Wauters telegraphed Vanderhallen, asking him to turn the military occupation into a police operation. Wauters also asked the district commissioner in Kasai to prevent the rebels from traveling to his district.

A letter written on 9 June by Vaninthout, administrator of Kandale, states: "From Kobo onwards all the blacks take flight when I approach; they are armed with bows and shoot arrows at any messengers sent to summon them," and requests military occupation of the Kandale chefferies.

On 14 July 1931 a daily newspaper, the Le Soir, published information about Belgian troops opening fire with machine guns on the rebels. The newspaper estimated that the rebels suffered around 100 deaths. The Belgian troops had only two wounded according to the newspaper. In 1932, in a declaration to the Chamber, the Colonial Minister acknowledged that machine guns had been used, and that the use of the machine guns had produced numerous victims.

Vanderhallen, acting on orders from Wauters, initially refused to accept attempts to surrender, on the grounds that Balot's remains, and in particular his skull, had not been recovered. For example, the chiefs of Yongo and Bangi attempted to surrender on 2 and 4 September, but were told that their surrenders would only be accepted if Balot's head, as well as other parts of his body, were returned. On 6 September, about four hundred villagers in Kilamba were arrested. On 9 September, Balot's head was recovered from Kilamba, a foot from Kisandale, and a finger from Kasandji. Also on 9 September, fourteen villagers were killed in the Indele region. On 16 September, more parts of Balot's body were recovered.

== Rituals ==
During the revolt, the rebels performed a number of religious rituals. However, according to Deputy Jacquemotte, this does not mean that the revolt broke out for religious reasons. Jacquemotte, like Dewilliamort, considered the reasons to be economic. He pointed out that, the price of palm nuts having fallen, the African people were forced to work for several months to pay their taxes. He declared: "The oppression weighing upon the tribes of the Congo is growing heavier by the day, and the exploitation of the blacks is every day more intense and more inhumane. The revolt is simply the logical and inevitable consequence of this oppression. It is the outcome towards which all those who, preferring anything, even death itself, to continuing their existence under present conditions, now willingly run."

== Bibliography ==
- Marchal, Jules (2008). Lord Leverhulme's Ghosts: Colonial Exploitation in the Congo. Translated by Martin Thom. Introduced by Adam Hochschild. London: Verso. ISBN 978-1-84467-239-4.
- University of Central Arkansas (2016). "Belgian Congo (1908–1960)".
