= Yaka language (Congo–Angola) =

Bantu language spoken in Angola and DRC

Yaka
- Iyaka
- Kiyaka
- Native to: Democratic Republic of the Congo, Angola
- Ethnicity: Yaka
- Native speakers: (900,000 cited 2000)
- Language family: Niger–Congo?: Atlantic–Congo; Volta-Congo; Benue–Congo; Bantoid; Southern Bantoid; Bantu (Zone H); Kongo-Yaka; Yaka languages; Yaka

Language codes
- ISO 639-3: Variously: yaf – Kiyaka noq – Ngoongo ppp – Pelende (duplicate code) lnz – Lonzo (duplicate code)
- Glottolog: yaka1269
- Guthrie code: H.31

Yaka, also spelled Iaca and Iyaka, is a Bantu language spoken in the Democratic Republic of the Congo and Angola. There are two dialects, Yaka proper, which comprises 99% of speakers, and Ngoongo (distinguish West Ngongo language). The alleged varieties Pelende and Lonzo are political rather than ethnolinguistic entities.

== Phonology ==
=== Consonants ===
		Labial	Alveolar	Palatal	Velar	Glottal
Nasal		m	n			
Plosive	voiceless	p	t		k	
Plosive	aspirated	pʰ	tʰ		kʰ	
Plosive	prenasal	ᵐb	ⁿd		ᵑɡ	
Plosive	voiced	b				
Affricate	voiceless	p͡f	t͡s			
Affricate	prenasal	ᶬb͡v	ⁿd͡z			
Fricative	voiceless	f	s			h
Fricative	voiced	v	z			
Approximant		w	l	j		

- The following consonants when preceding /w/ may also be labialized; /tʷ, kʷ, bʷ, ᵐbʷ, ⁿd͡zʷ, ᵑɡʷ, fʷ, sʷ, hʷ, vʷ, mʷ, nʷ, lʷ/.
- The following consonants when preceding /j/ may also be palatalized; /tʲ, kʲ, bʲ, dʲ, t͡sʲ, sʲ, hʲ, zʲ, mʲ, nʲ/.

=== Vowels ===
	Front	Central	Back
Close	i iː		u uː
Mid	e eː		o oː
Open		a aː	
