= Mbangala language =

Bantu language spoken in Angola

Mbangala
- Native to: Angola
- Native speakers: 400,000 (2012)
- Language family: Niger–Congo?: Atlantic–Congo; Benue–Congo; Bantoid; Bantu (Zone H); Yaka languages (H.30); Mbangala

Language codes
- ISO 639-3: mxg
- Glottolog: mban1264
- Guthrie code: H.34

Mbangala (Bangala) is a Bantu language of Angola.
