= Pende language =

Bantu language spoken in the DR Congo

Pende
- Giphende
- Native to: Democratic Republic of the Congo
- Region: Bandundu Province
- Ethnicity: Pende people
- Native speakers: (420,000 cited 1991)
- Language family: Niger–Congo?: Atlantic–Congo; Volta-Congo; Benue–Congo; Bantoid; Southern Bantoid; Bantu (Zone L); Holu–Pende (L.10); Pende

Language codes
- ISO 639-3: pem
- Glottolog: phen1239
- Guthrie code: L.11

- Person: Muphende
- People: Baphende
- Language: Giphende

Pende (Phende) is a Bantu language of the Democratic Republic of the Congo. Giphende is spoken in Kwilu Province, in Gungu and Idiofa districts as well as some areas of Kasaï Province. The Bapende used to call themselves Akwa Nzumba (in Kasai), Akwa Thunda (in Gungu), or Akwa Mbongo (in Idiofa).
