= Suku language =

Bantu language spoken in DR Congo

Suku
- Kisuku
- Native to: Democratic Republic of the Congo
- Ethnicity: Suku people
- Native speakers: (50,000 cited 1980)
- Language family: Niger–Congo?: Atlantic–Congo; Volta-Congo; Benue–Congo; Bantoid; Southern Bantoid; Bantu (Zone H); Yaka languages (H.30); Suku–Sonde; Suku

Language codes
- ISO 639-3: sub
- Glottolog: suku1259
- Guthrie code: H.32

Suku is a Bantu language of the Democratic Republic of the Congo.

There is some debate about its classification. Nurse & Philippson (2003) accept its traditional classification in the Yaka branch of Bantu.
