= Kwese language =

Bantu language of the Democratic Republic of the Congo

Kwese
- Kikwese
- Native to: Democratic Republic of Congo
- Region: Bandundu Province
- Native speakers: (undated figure of 60,000)
- Language family: Niger–Congo?: Atlantic–Congo; Benue–Congo; Bantoid; Bantu (Zone L); Holu–Pende (L.10); Kwese

Language codes
- ISO 639-3: kws
- Glottolog: kwes1244
- Guthrie code: L.13

Kwese is a Bantu language of the Democratic Republic of the Congo.

== See also ==
- Kwese people
