= Shinji language =

Bantu language of DR Congo

Shinji
- Yungo
- Native to: Democratic Republic of the Congo
- Language family: Niger–Congo?: Atlantic–Congo; Benue–Congo; Bantoid; Bantu (Zone H); Yaka languages (H.30); Shinji

Language codes
- ISO 639-3: None (mis)
- Linguist List: 1zi
- Glottolog: None
- Guthrie code: H.35

Shinji (Sinji), or Yungo, is a Bantu language of the Democratic Republic of the Congo, between Mbangala and Yaka.

According to Multitree, the spellings are Şinji (Shinji) and Nuŋgo, rather than Yungo as in Maho (2009), and mentions of the language in the literature are almost entirely in reference to Guthrie.
