= Yaka people =

Ethnic group in the Democratic Republic of the Congo

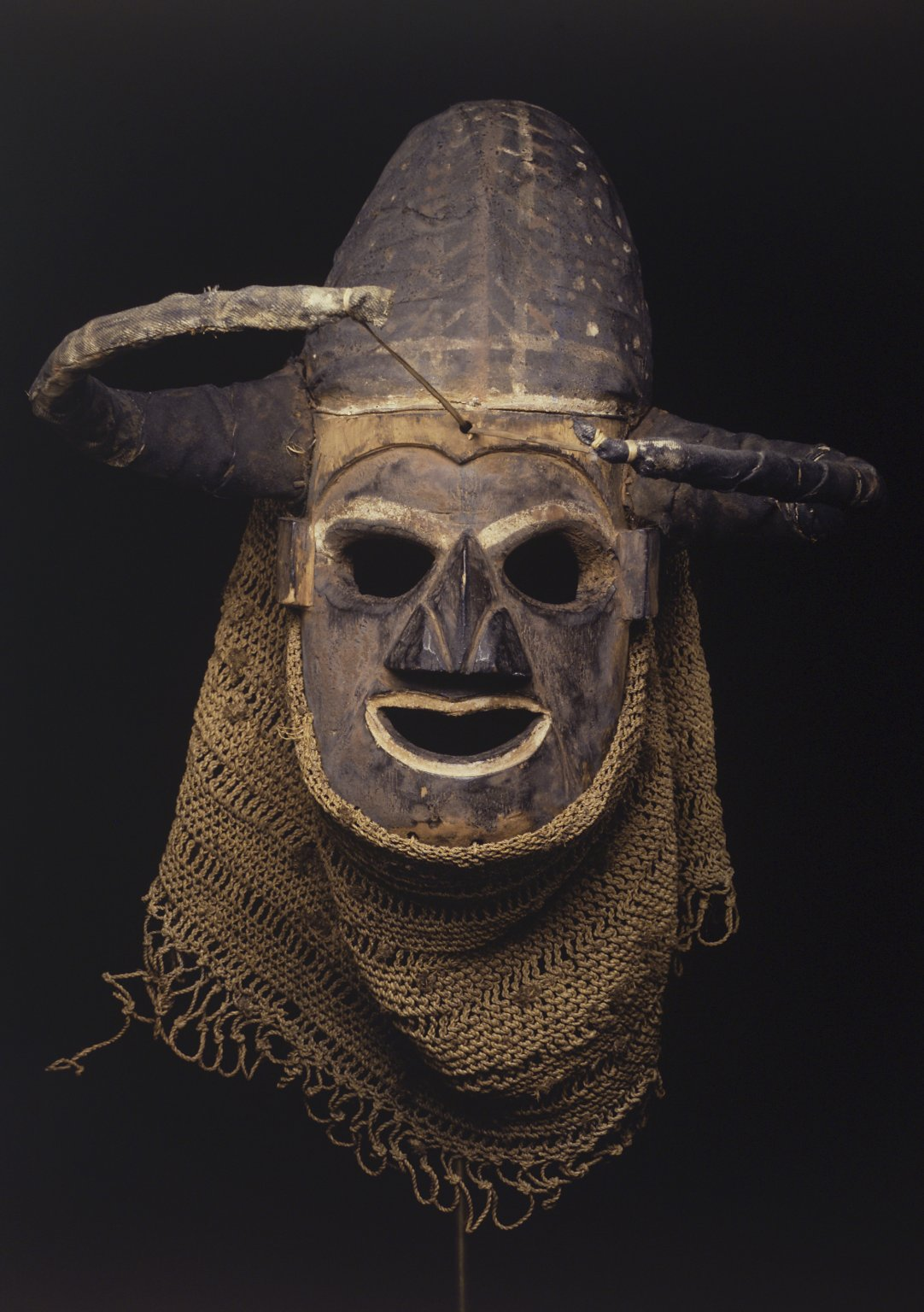
A Yaka people's mask at the Brooklyn Museum.

The Yaka are an African ethnic group found in southwest Democratic Republic of the Congo, with the Angola border to their west. They number about 300,000 and are related to the Suku people. They live in the forest and savanna region between the Kwango River and the Wamba River. They speak the Yaka language.

The Yaka people are a matrilineal society that includes patrilineal lineage as family name. Their villages have chiefs, who are recognized by the Congo government as a political office. The Yaka farm cassava, sweet potatoes, and corn as staple source of food, and supplement this with fish and game meat. They have traditionally hunted with the help of hunting dogs. In contemporary times, they are also migrant workers in urban areas.

The Yaka are notable for their arts and handicrafts. They make statues, portraits, baskets, carved objects, masks, tools for cooking, building, hunting, fishing or entertaining with additions of instruments such as drums. Their masks are bulky, distinctive with upturned noses and eyes shaped in the form of globules. These masks were frequently used in various Traditional Religion ceremonies. Their sculptures called mbwoolo and their carved slit drum called mukoku are regionally famous and used in ritual dances.

== History ==
=== Exodus and establishment of the Yaka kingdom ===
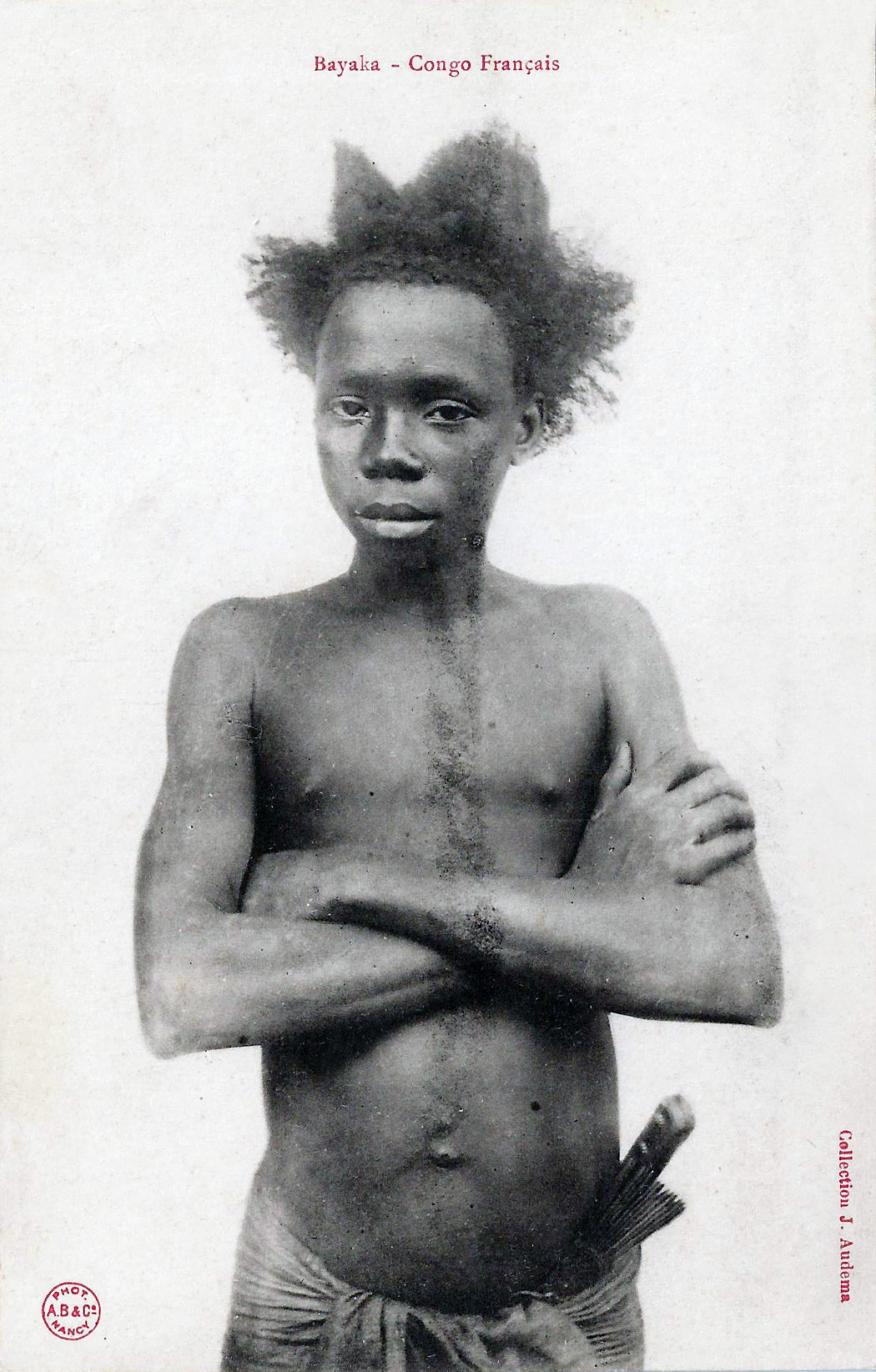
Portrait of a Yaka in the former French Congo, photographed between 1896 and 1910 by French colonial officer and photographer Jean‑François Audema.

King Kabamba led the exodus of the Lunda westward around the 17th century, the most organized expedition towards the conquest of the Kwango region in the kingdom of Kongo. Some Lunda had already preceded this. These Lunda conquerors were endowed with three major qualities: diplomacy, sociability and The organization, which enabled them to found the Yaka kingdom in the seventeenth century, harmoniously integrating the pre-established Kongo nations. The Lunda used this "soft power", more than fighting, to favor the union of the two peoples, Lunda and Kongo, under the kingdom Yaka. Ethnologists and sociologists unanimously agree that, throughout Belgian colonial history, this kingdom was one of the best organized and Especially the most resistant to Western penetration.

Other sources suggest there was an earlier Yaka Kingdom which was defeated and subordinated by expansion of the Lunda Empire in the 1730s.

The name Yaka is a title that the Kongo gave to their warriors. Upon the arrival of Lunda, the kingdom of Kongo was already weakened by Portuguese incursions. Thus, the resistance that the Lunda find in the Kwango region is that of the isolated local tribes Kongo, including the Mbala, Tsamba, Hungana, Pindi, Ngongo, rather than that of a United Kongo kingdom. The Lunda, these "biluwa", or foreigners, which Nothing resisted on their passage, capable of catching bullets and arrows, were also called "Iluwa" (foreigners) or Bayaka (Catchers of the balls and the arrows). Both the Lunda that arrived and the kongo warriors had similar traits, hence the exact titles being given to them.

The Lunda, who had an interest in integrating into their political organization the local tribes who had not fled the invasion or who did not want to fight, had in turn adopted the identity "Yaka" which, in addition to conferring on them a title of nobility of the "invincible", integrated them better In their new country.

They had also gradually adopted the Kongo language (hence the Kiyaka language being spoken amongst them, an offshoot of Kikongo). Much more, Lunda chiefs married Kongo women. The offspring identified themselves as Yaka rather than Lunda. Thus, the Yaka appellation had established itself as a generic identity Of the Lunda and Kongo inhabiting territories area under the authority of the Kabamba-Lunda, namely the territories of Kabamba-Lunda, Kenge and Popokabaka.

The Lunda of Nzofu later came in the territory of Kahemba retain the Lunda identity and language. As for the territory of Feshi, they emigrated there in the middle of the 18th century from the Basuku, a group of Kongo, who disassociated themselves from the power of Kabamba -Lunda and whose leader "Meni Kongo" refused to submit to the authority of the latter. Some other Kongo groups: the Mbala, Tsamba, Hungana, Pindi and Ngongo, etc. Had already emigrated to the Kwilu, leaving behind them, brothers and sisters who, together with the Lunda, composed the Yaka kingdom. The five territories that make up Kwango are therefore a binational space, Kongo and Lunda.

The reconciliation is thus the end of the wars of conquest between Kongo ethnic groups and the Lunda in Kwango was sealed by a ceremony and a particular ceremony in which the chief Meni Kongo representing Of the original Tsamba clans of Feshi and the Lunda chiefs were to share parrot, dog and cat meat raw. At the end of this ceremony, the representatives of two nations buried their war weapons and promised peaceful coexistence forever. The Kongo and the Lunda of Kwango have lived in perfect harmony since the beginning of the 19th century.

=== Contact with European powers ===
When the administration of Leopold II arrived in Kwango after their establishment in Bas-Congo, Kwango Was an organized kingdom; The power of Kabamba -Lunda was legitimized and respected by all the peoples, Kongo and Lunda. It was also well represented on the whole kingdom that stretched from Kabamba-Lunda to Popokabaka through the present territory of Kenge. Peace between the Bayaka (Kongo and Lunda under the power of the Kabamba -Lunda), their brothers, the Basuku of Meni Kongo in the Feshi and the Lunda of Nzofu in Kahemba.

According to Crawford Young, the Lunda empires in Kwango and Katanga had understood that colonial occupation was an aggression to repel and fight. The other groups, apart from a few scattered revolts including that of Bapendé, had behaved as if the exploration and occupation of their spaces by strangers were normal. (C. Young, 1965: 295-6).

=== Kabamba resistance against Europeans ===
By the year 1890, a skilled administrator named Dhanis came to negotiate his acceptance with King "Kabamba" faustin. It was not even with his replacement of the name of Dussart who sought to impose the Leopold administration on Kwango even by force. It was then that in 1892 and 1893 there were two wars ranked between the two armies, that of the Kabamba faustin and that of the Leopoldian administration in which there were considerable losses on both sides. If the principal Belgian agent perished in the first war of 1892, the one which followed in 1893 with a greater reinforcement of soldiers of the public force saw the assassination of the Kabamba faustin. It was also the beginning of the destabilization of the kings, but not that of the kingdom or the resistance. In fact, the kings who were enthroned after this revolting event showed themselves more intransigent with respect to submission to the power of whites. Thus, faced with repression, they had the choice either to go into exile with their brothers, the Lunda of Angola, or to undergo forced relegation to Banningville or elsewhere. Mulombo kings Désiré Nkulu and Chief Munene Nkenzi were deported respectively, while the kabamba Koko Kodia Puanga found refuge in Angola in 1915. After the two bloody wars of 1892 and 1893, when the Kwango was militarily armed, the resistance assumed passive form. This took many forms, ranging from the subtle violence by leopard men "Masiona" to civil disobedience and the refusal to serve any power of oppression, to participate in any enterprise or to obey any colonial injunction. It was this passive resistance that continued throughout the colonial era until independence. When in 1908, Leopold II ceded the Congo to Belgium, the colonial administration, to whom the narrative of the resistance Yaka had already been made, tried to occupy the Kwango by force, but she stumbled upon the civil resistance whose main manifestation was the refusal of cooperation with the colonial agents. Even after the assassination in 1893 of the kabamba Tsiimba Nkumbi, under which open resistance was waged, the Bayaka continued civic resistance. Because of the unfortunate incidents of the conflict, and after 2 years of colonial military siege, the colonial mission in Kwango was abandoned.

That the Kwango hindered the colonial work and wished to overthrows the sovereignty of the Congo, in the hands of the colonial administration, which in turn forced to administration to put the Kwango on hold; Which meant that no development project could be undertaken. This did not prevent the Bayaka associating themselves with nationalists message of Lumumba, due to their strong presence in Kinshasa, only a century later, they heavily precipitate in the movement of independence, especially as the party that brought them together "LUKA "(The Kwangolese Union for Freedom and Independence) which had as its main objective the independence. The Bayaka, by their strong mobilization in Kinshasa, contributed strongly to the events that precipitated the independence of the Congo in 1959 - 1960.

=== Bayaka’s denigration ===
The denigration of the Bayaka was originally the work of the colonial agents. The latter, after having abandoned the Kwango, were to create the division to better establish their authority in neighbouring Bas-Congo and Kwilu. Afterwards, they began spreading propaganda about the Bayaka, claiming them to be "warriors and savages", as they did not accept western civilization. This became the means of dividing and reigning. This is how, from the machinations of colonialists, stereotypes stick to the identity of Yaka, especially in Kinshasa, the capital, where all the tribes of the Congo eventually meet. Nevertheless, as can be seen in the writings of sociologists And Belgian ethnologists, the colonial administration recognized the organization and dynamism of the Bayaka. As all slanderous statements are made away from Kwango, or whispering, the Bayaka have imperturbably pursued their traditional activities in all areas: art, craftsmanship, construction, hunting, fishing and agriculture.

The Bayaka fell victim to their exceptional resistance to colonial oppression and exploitation. Those of the Kwango, have among other things, resisted fiercely efforts of "pacification" of the Force Publique and Leopold II's administration.

== Culture ==
=== Leadership ===
The Yaka people are led by the kiambv (pl biambv), or the paramount chief. Governing a specific cluster of villages underneath the paramount chief are the forty one nobles, called bilio (sing. yilolo). Each of the villages is governed by an earth chief, called a tulamba (pl. kalamba). Periodic tributes of parts of powerful animals such as leopard or elephants are periodically paid to the paramount chief by both the village and regional chiefs as a way to show respect to his authority. Tributes were also paid in ndzimbu shell money which was an early substitute for currency. Paramount chiefs are believed to rule over the underworld as well as the physical realm and are capable of seeing the activities of witches, called baloki. They are known to themselves partake in witchcraft and sorcery, receiving tributes and attaining blood debts by taking part in the witches’ cannibalist feasts and further indulge in it by transforming into a wild animal such as a leopard to keep antisocial actions in check. This use of witchcraft is permitted only if it is done to a limited extent and for the good of the community. Paramount chiefs are also expected to show off his powers of generation through his fertility, cultivating many wives and children, establishing links to other families and resources as well as mediating the life forces from the ancestors. A fertile chief is said to bring strong, authoritative leadership which brings order in the cycle of nature, control, and general prosperity, while sterility is said to be linked to weak leadership which brings disaster, famine and disease.

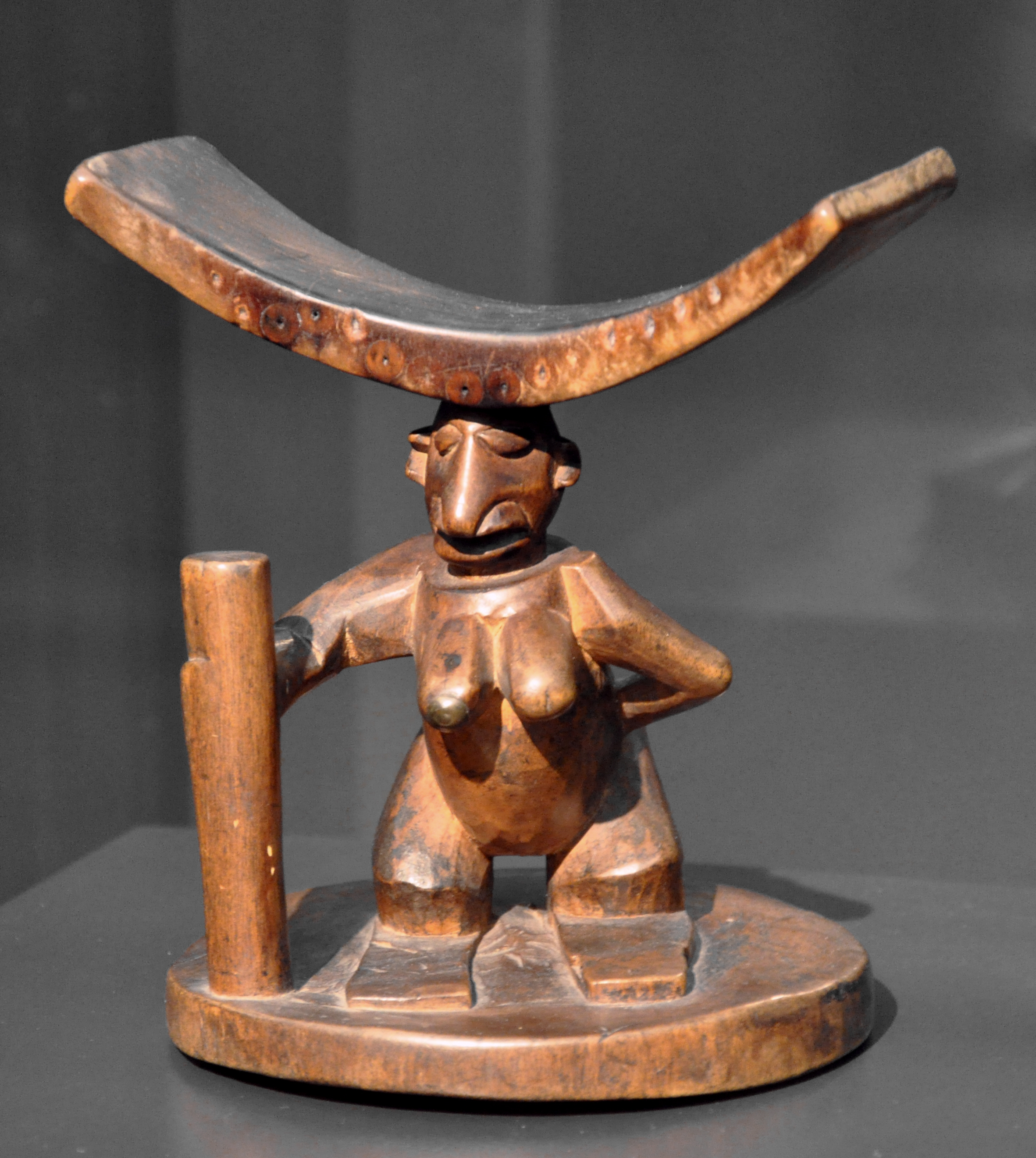
A Yaka headrest

The paramount chief's authority was most signified by coiled rings around his ankle and arm that contain fibers and a sacrificial tendon wrapped in copper called the kazekedi or lukano. Another great signifier of chiefly rulership is the mbeele phoko, a double sided sword that is sheathed in a phallus shaped wood and hide sheath that embodies the founding ancestor and signifies the chief's role in maintaining order and securing food as well as his powers over life and death. It is only unsheathed in the special occasions of execution and warfare. The authority of the nobles was established by tsala, beaded hats form the top of which juts out a cone embellished with a tuft of feathers. Tsala are differentiated by the colors of their feathers. Tsala zi kanaangi, which had white feathers signify a higher rank than tsala zi nduwa, which had red feathers. White feathers could only be worn by lower rank chiefs when their superiors were not present. The earth chiefs wore woven raffia headpieces called bweni as their symbols of authority.

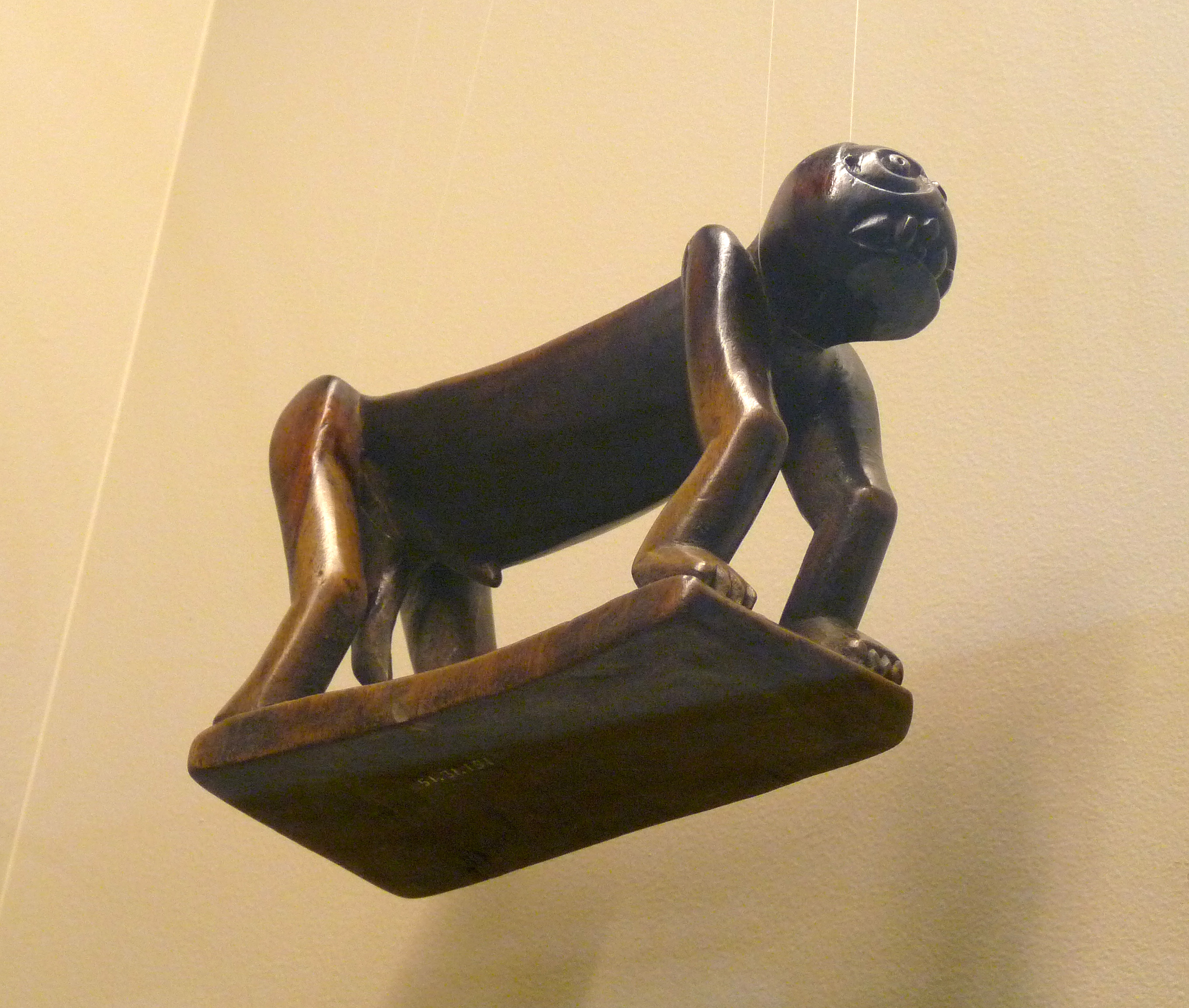
A Yaka headrest

Bewni commonly had between one and three crests running from the front to the back of the head. Bweni must be worn throughout day and night as they were communal charms that protected from wicked influences. These headpieces required the use of a headrest, called musaw or m-baambu, as they were also worn as charms while sleeping. These headrests were used to support the head just below the ear while one lies on their side. The headrests were carved from a single piece of wood and commonly featured imagery of a leopard, antelope, human, or a house with a pitched roof. To prevent from wicked influences many Yaka headrests had charms that were either inserted into a premade cavity or attached to them to protect the owner from wicked influences while they slept.

=== Reverence for elders ===
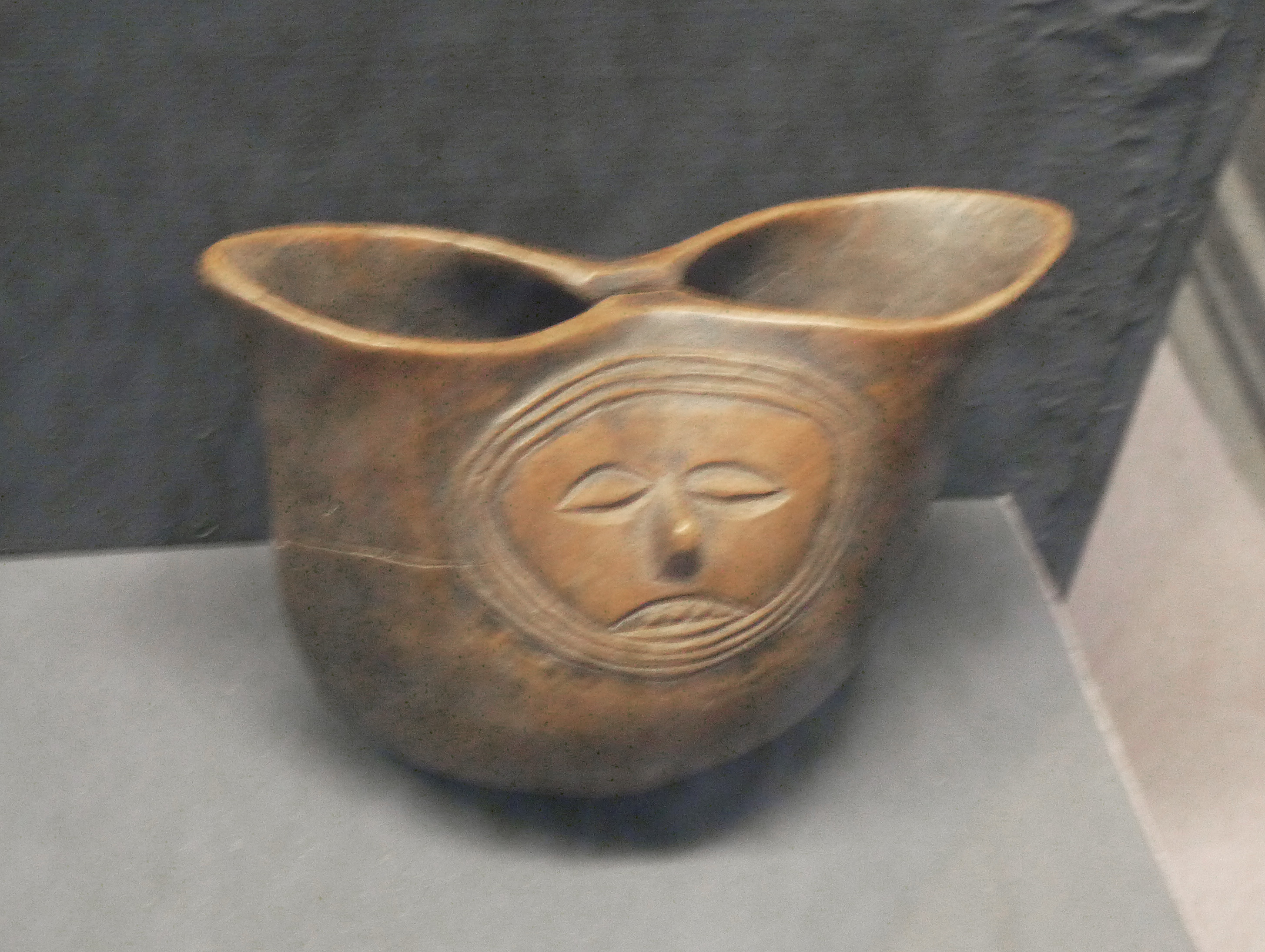
A double mouthed kyopa cup

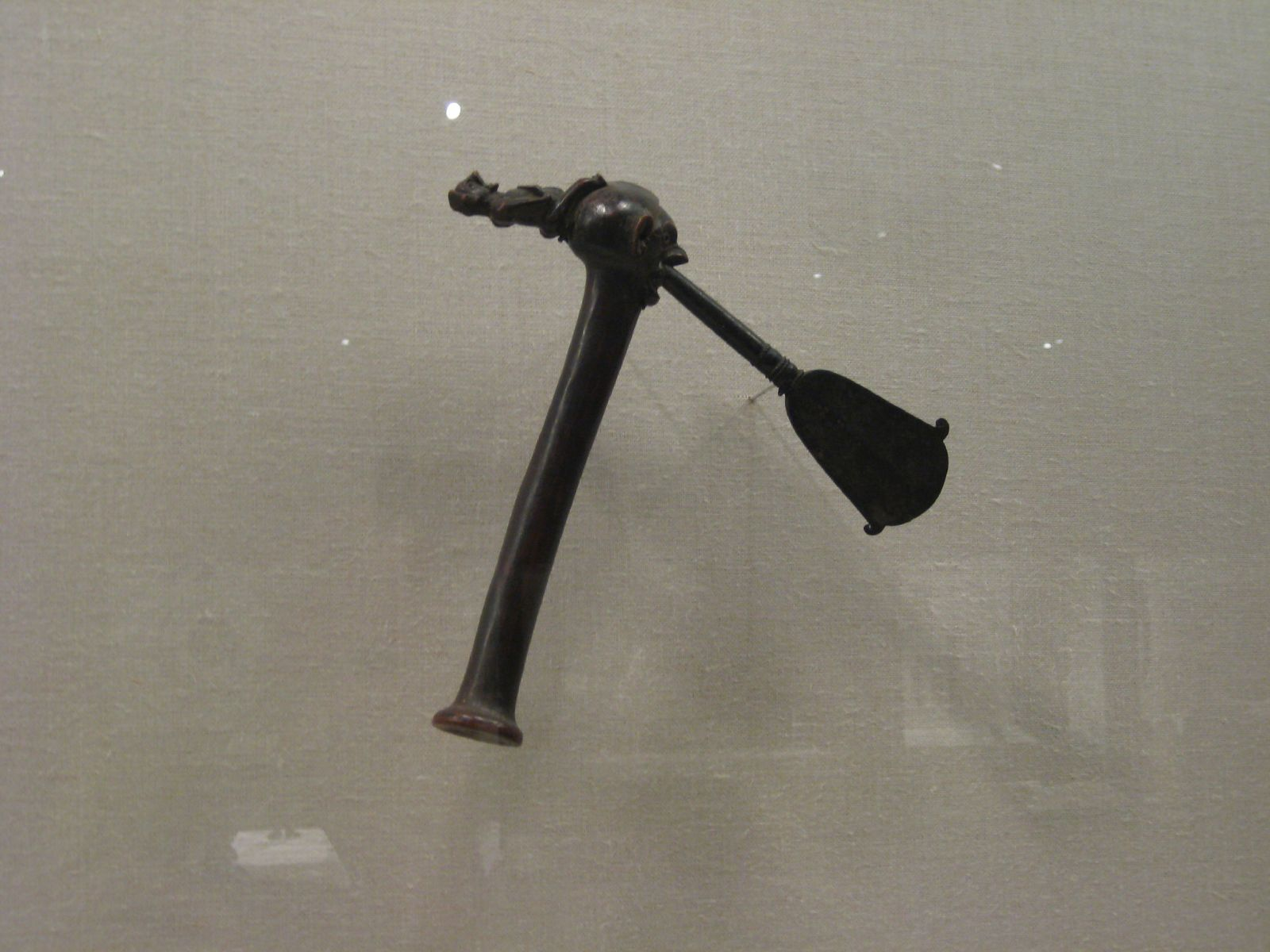
A khaandu hatchet

Lineage elders command respect and authority in both life and death. Just as they strive to please them, they fear their disapproval. As a symbol of their favor, young men often offer gifts to their elders to secure kaolin. Similarly, elders offer gifts of palm wine and dried meat and mushrooms to the deceased ancestors to ask forgiveness for any responsibilities they’ve neglected. Offerings made to honor the ancestors are focused on the grave site. Many graves are constructed in dwellings or placed in enclosures where n-saanda and n-yoombu trees are planted. Requests are not made to specific individuals, but to one or two named ancestor as a bridge between the generations. As a show of authority, matrilineage headmen carry khaandu hatchets on their shoulders when visiting kinsman. The hatchets feature elongated blades protruding from the mouths of heads carved on the handles which signifies the authority in its wielder's words. Matrilineage headmen use wooden double mouthed cups called kyopa for the ceremonial drinking of palm wine. These cups are passed down through generations along with a lecture on how to treat other lineage members. The vessel’s shape is based on the form a squat gourd takes when split top to bottom. A bridge is carved into the middle of the cup to separate the two mouths. The kyopa and the khaandu are both seen as extensions of missuungu, or the sacred container, which is never displayed and signifies the lineage's blood, unity, and structure of authority.

=== Divination ===
The diviner, known as a ngoombu, is a specialist who can be male or whose main purpose is to find meaning in strange phenomena, periods of misfortune, sustained illness, and untimely death.

During a divination session, the diviner sits across from the client and begins to chant influences of curses that may have been afflicted. It is not uncommon for the client’s relatives to be in attendance and to repeat the ends of the chants. Afterward, the client rubs his arms with kaolin and offers the diviner a ndzimbu shell which was wiped it on their brow to be placed with the spread of tools. The diviner then holds a charm packet behind a bowl of water or a hand mirror and begins to reveal the problem along with the locations of certain events, and names of the individuals involved. If the client is satisfied, they then give payment and indulges into more detail before the session is put on hold so the diviner can dream on the matter. The following day the diviner reveals the curse responsible for the client’s affliction.

Divination equipment ranges from assorted packets, small containers, vials, bowls or hand mirrors, carved mbwoolo statuettes, and medicinal herbs and spices wrapped in a bundle of cloth. Diviners often used mukoku slit drums that were topped with carved heads to provide rhythm for chants. The compartments in the drums are often used for mixing and serving medicines. The drum is struck with a baton that is attached to it by a cord. They can also be laid horizontally to be used as stools for the diviner. When not in use they are stood vertically with one end of the baton placed into the slit of the drum. Another important divination tool is a dog or jackal skull with ingredients for charms placed in the eye sockets.

=== Hunting ===
The Yaka is a hunting society so above all else, a male in the Yaka tribe is a hunter. Hunting is more than just a way to provide food, it is a symbol of status and masculinity. Being a good hunter is a show of prosperity and being able to provide for one’s family and further their lineage. Before a group hunt, hunters are made to practice sexual abstinence, staying away from menstruating women, and resolving any outstanding conflicts. Bow and arrows, rifles, and lances are the hunter’s primary weapons, as well as the use of snares and traps. In group hunts hunters will often use long nets and dogs to surround their prey. Duiker, antelope, buffalo, and wild boar are the most commonly pursued animals.

Before a hunt, men are signaled a few days prior by the playing of a whistle or a miniature flute, called a kasengo-sengo. The group agrees on a hunting site then sends gifts of palm wine and kola nuts to the earth chief for approval and as offerings to the ancestors. The hunters then gather together to lay their bows, arrows, guns, or lances down by the n-saanda tree. They then call upon the ancestors and settle any grievances from any past hunts and are given pieces of kaolin to rub on the forearm, bow, or barrel of the gun.

The leader of the hunt carries an elongated whistle around his neck, called a yimbila, in order to call his dong and signal the other hunters. It possesses an extension on its side with a hole that is used to alter its pitch, while the lower end is carved in the shape of a human head to protect from witches bringing bad luck to the hunt. There is a more spherical variety with a similar, but shorter side extension called a ndemba.

In a hunt, the animal goes to whoever's arrow strikes it first. Though the owner of any other arrows that strike it as well as the dog that tracked it down. The land chief and political chief receive the rest of the portions. Animals that are capable of killing humans have their skins, teeth, or tusks given as tribute to the paramount chief. It is also customary to divide portions equally between one’s own dependents and the other lineage headmen, which is seen as a high honor.

=== Nkanda ===
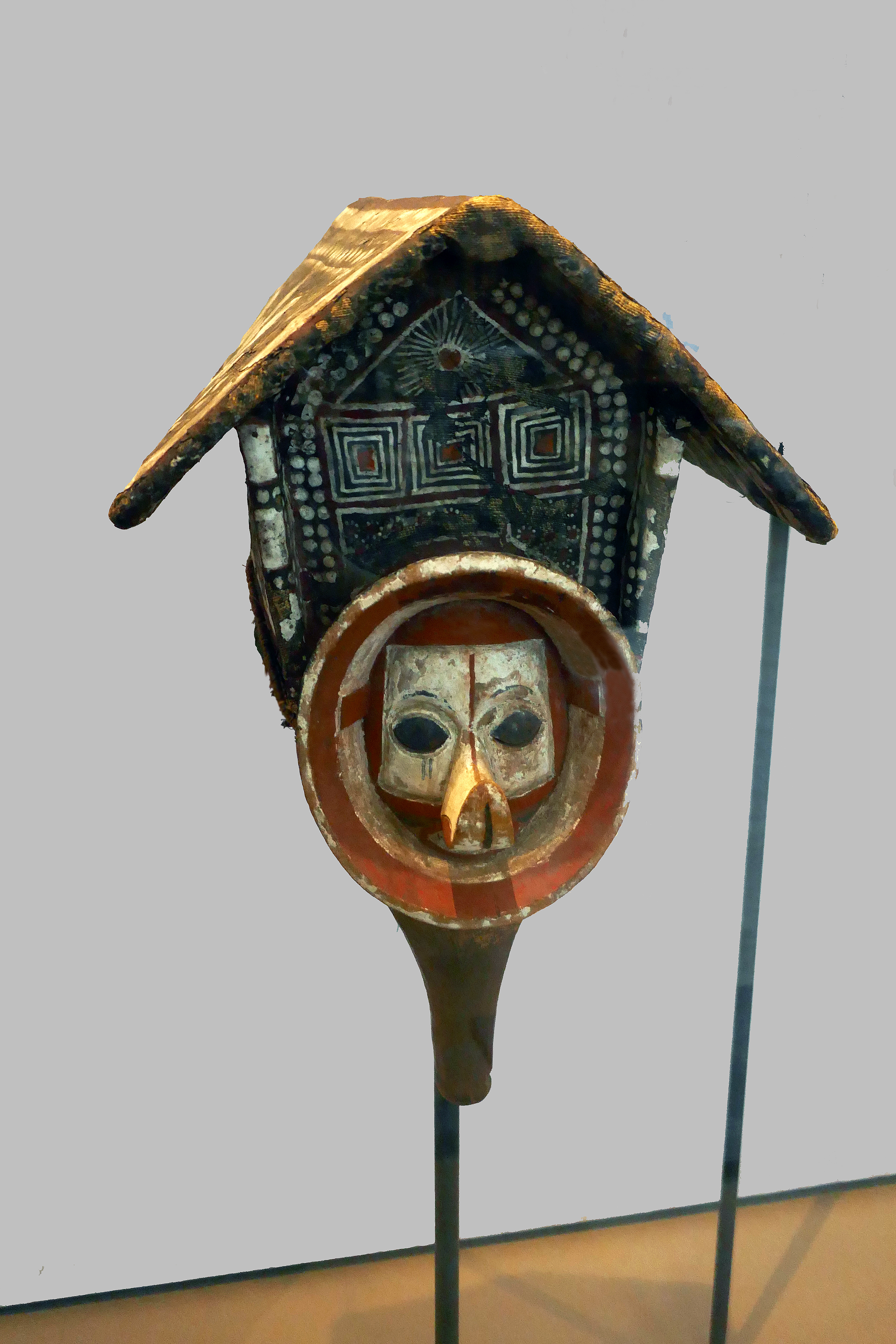
A handheld nkanda mask

An important part of the Yaka culture is the ceremony of nkanda, which is ceremony to present young men after they have undergone circumcision, and have gone through a set of rituals and activities that teaches them to be proper tribal members. Unlike the neighboring cultures who circumcise their children at birth, the Yaka wait to circumcise until they hit puberty. The village elders begin the initiation when they have a good amount of young adolescent boys. After the circumcision, the initiates, now tundansi, leave the village for anywhere from one to three years to advance their skills and be taught how to be proper men in their society, during which they are shut apart from other villagers, and are forbidden from seeing women.

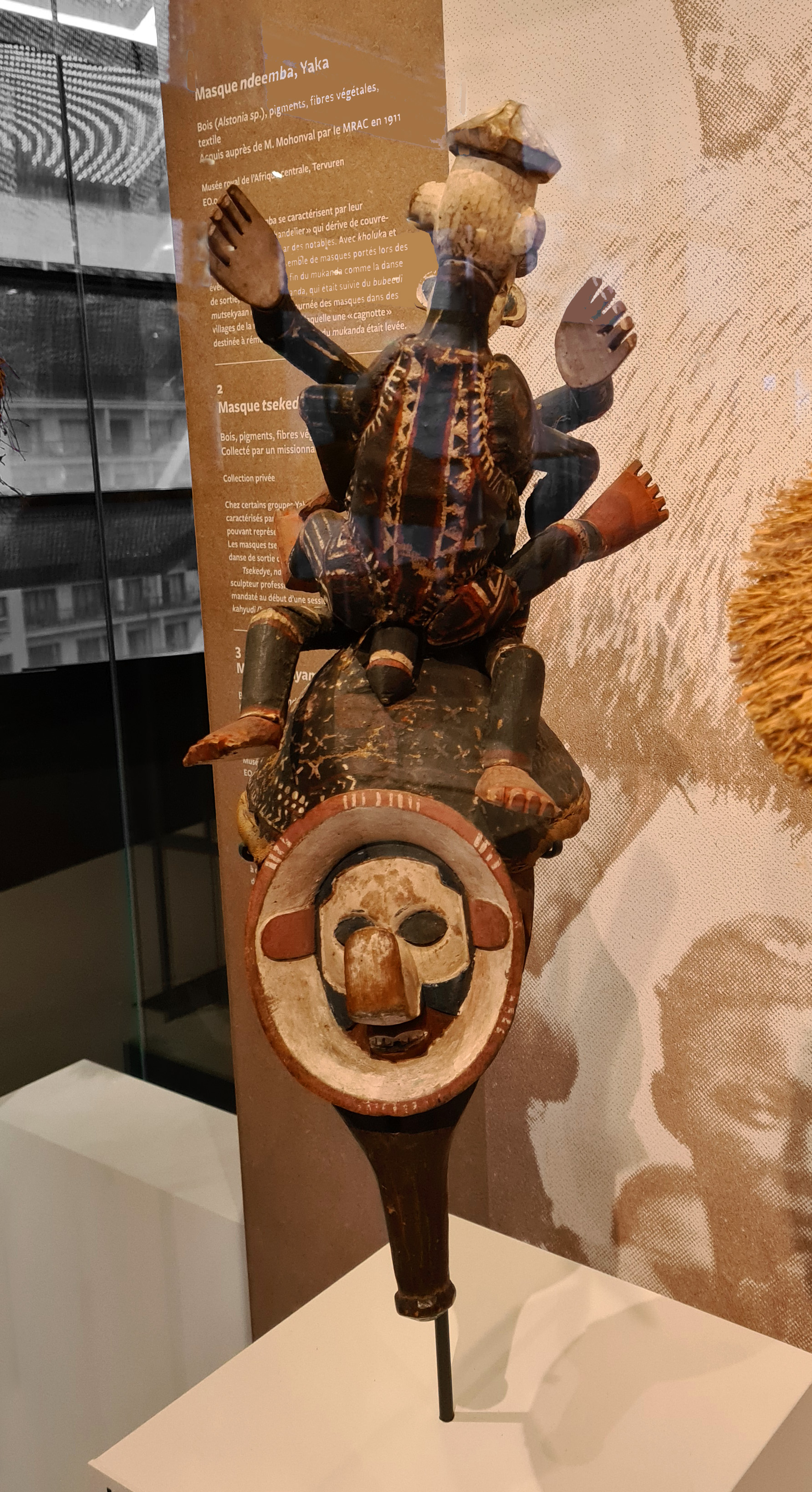
A handheld nkanda mask

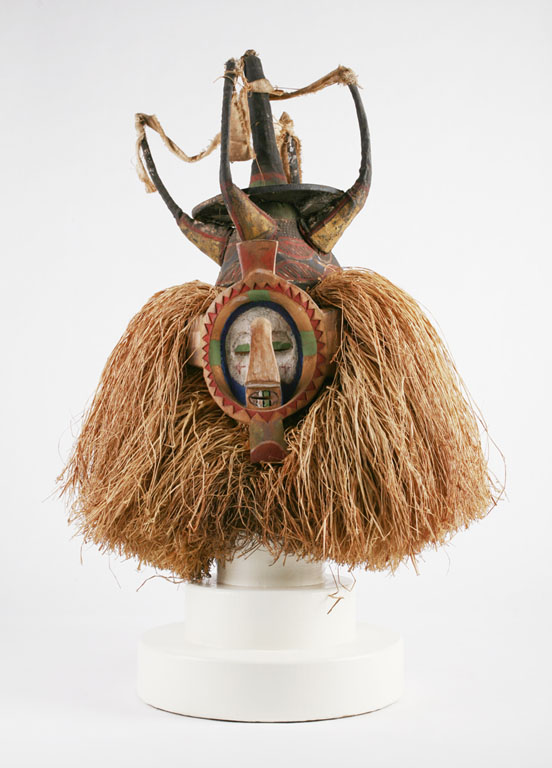
A Nkanda mask (ndemba)

Their isolation only ends once their teachers, or tulombusi, along with the elders, deem them ready and then the ceremony begins. Usually, there are 5 participants, the top ranking tundansi from each group, with two pairs wearing similar masks, mondo and ndemba to the lowest and highest ranking pairs respectively, and the leader wearing a more unique mask called the kapita. These masks are made as less elaborate versions of the mbala. The ceremony's leading mask, the mbala, is worn by the leader of the tulombusi and is meticulously designed by both the sculptor and the wearer to amuse the spectators. The masks are crafted with bulging eyes, a prominent, upturned nose, and an open mouth, often with teeth exposed. The face is framed by a wooden projection that can be as simple as a visor or bonnet shape, or can encircle and the face completely, creating a literal frame. The masks have a variety of head pieces which can include horizontal disks supported by a single conical shape, three crests running down the head from front to back, or horizontal disks supported by a tapering cone with smaller spires jutting from out of the base.

The masks are worn atop the head in a way that the dancers are easily identifiable during the ceremony. During the ceremony the tundansi masks are laid down to be inspected and judged on the colors, creativity, and overall execution to decide which among them are the most talented. The masks worn by are often very creative as they are carved by the tundansi themselves and there are no restrictions placed on their subject matter. The masks can be decorated with animals, human figures, or even machines such as airplanes. Some masks have even been shown to have satirical caricatures of white people or other village members. Due to only being made for single use, the masks are quick to decay as they have little protection against damage from things like termites.

== Art ==
=== Masks ===
In Yaka culture, masks are believed to have spiritual power and are used to communicate with the spirit world. They are often worn by dancers and performers during ceremonies and rituals and are thought to embody the spirits of ancestors and other supernatural beings.

Yaka masks are typically made from wood and are often painted with bright colors or adorned with raffia, shells, and other decorative elements. They are used in a variety of cultural and religious contexts, including initiation ceremonies, funerals, and healing rituals. Yaka masks are carved in distinct styles, which are characterized by elaborate features such as oblong faces, helmet-shaped exteriors in the shape of either human, antelope, or buffalo heads, armature like framework attached to the headpieces, or the lack of carved facial features.

A prominent mask style is the kholuka which is used in male initiation ceremonies and is believed to embody the spirit of a powerful warrior. The mask features a fierce, expressive face that is distinctively masculine. It possesses a prominent forehead crest and may be adorned with assorted decorative elements. The mask’s broad nose, large eyes, and wide, toothy grin, are intended to convey a sense of power and vitality. They also commonly feature a figure or figures attached to the headpiece.

Another prominent style is the kakuungu which has the primary purpose of instilling fear and is considered to be well-made when it can do so at first glance. The mask is long and narrow and it features a high, pointed forehead and a small, closed mouth. The mask's most distinctive features are its deep-set, almond-shaped eyes, as well as its inflated cheeks and pronounced chin. The mask surface may also be adorned with intricate patterns carved into the wood which may have symbolic meanings related to death, the afterlife, and other spiritual concepts.

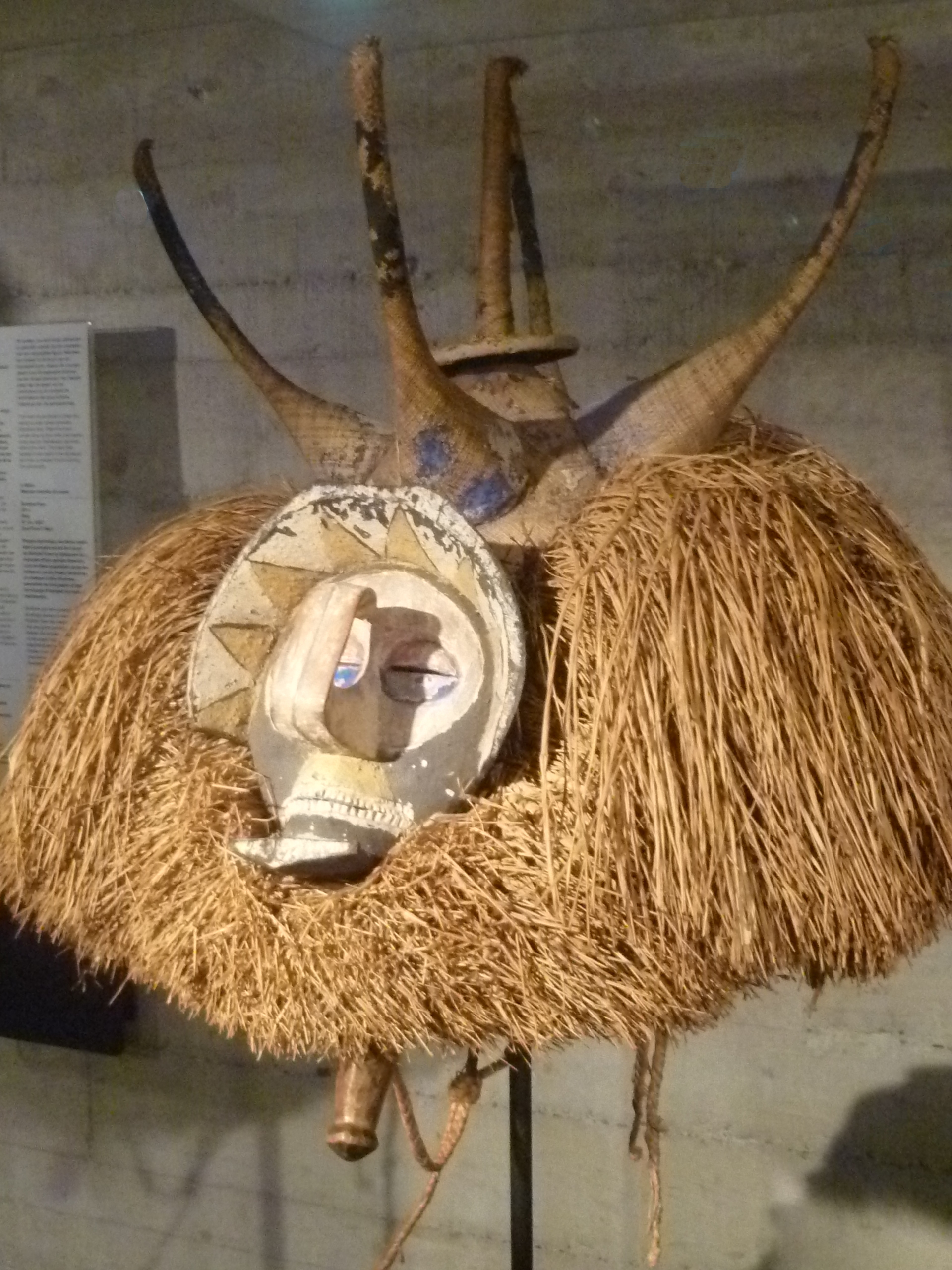
A Yaka nkanda mask

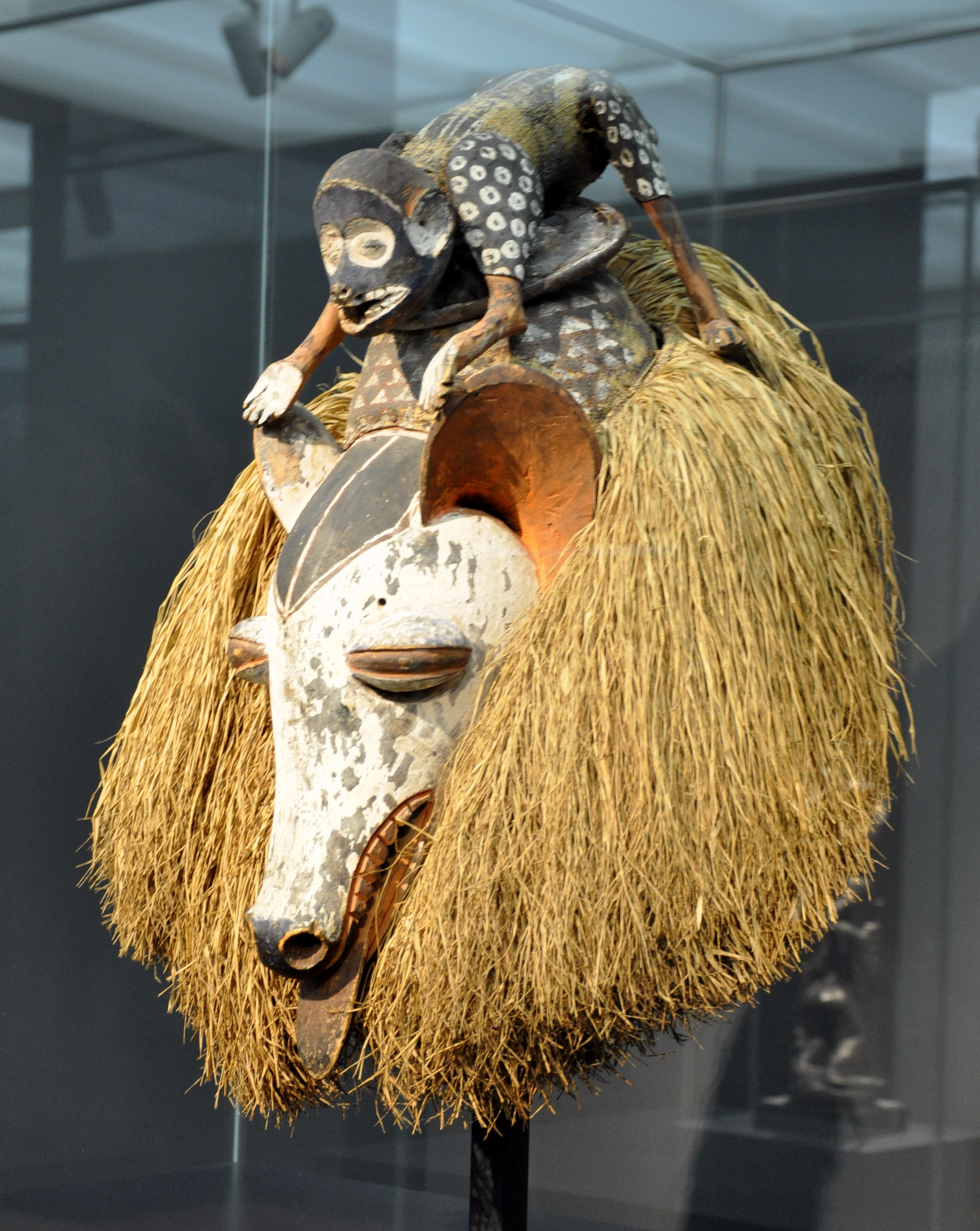
A Yaka mask

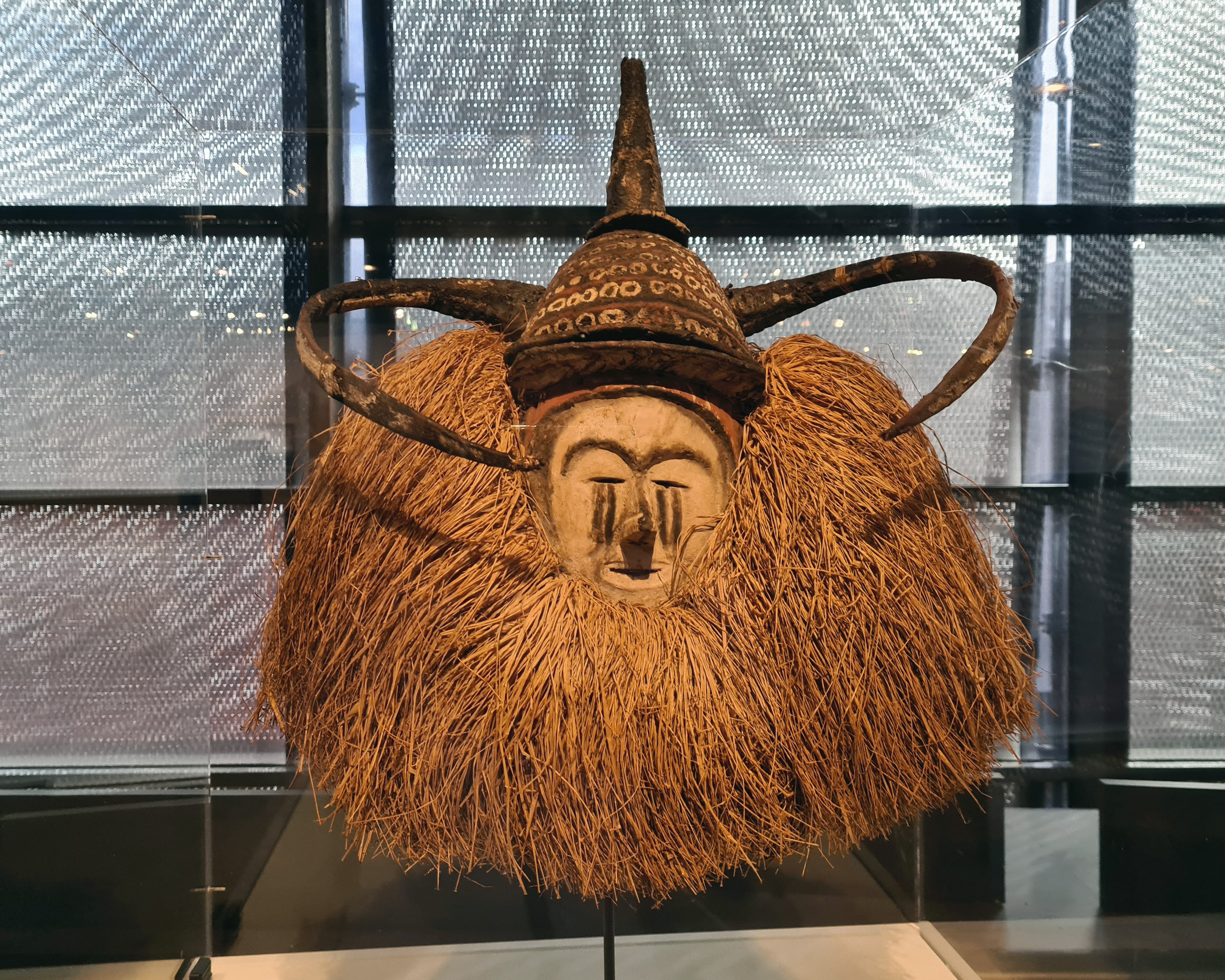
A Yaka kholuka mask

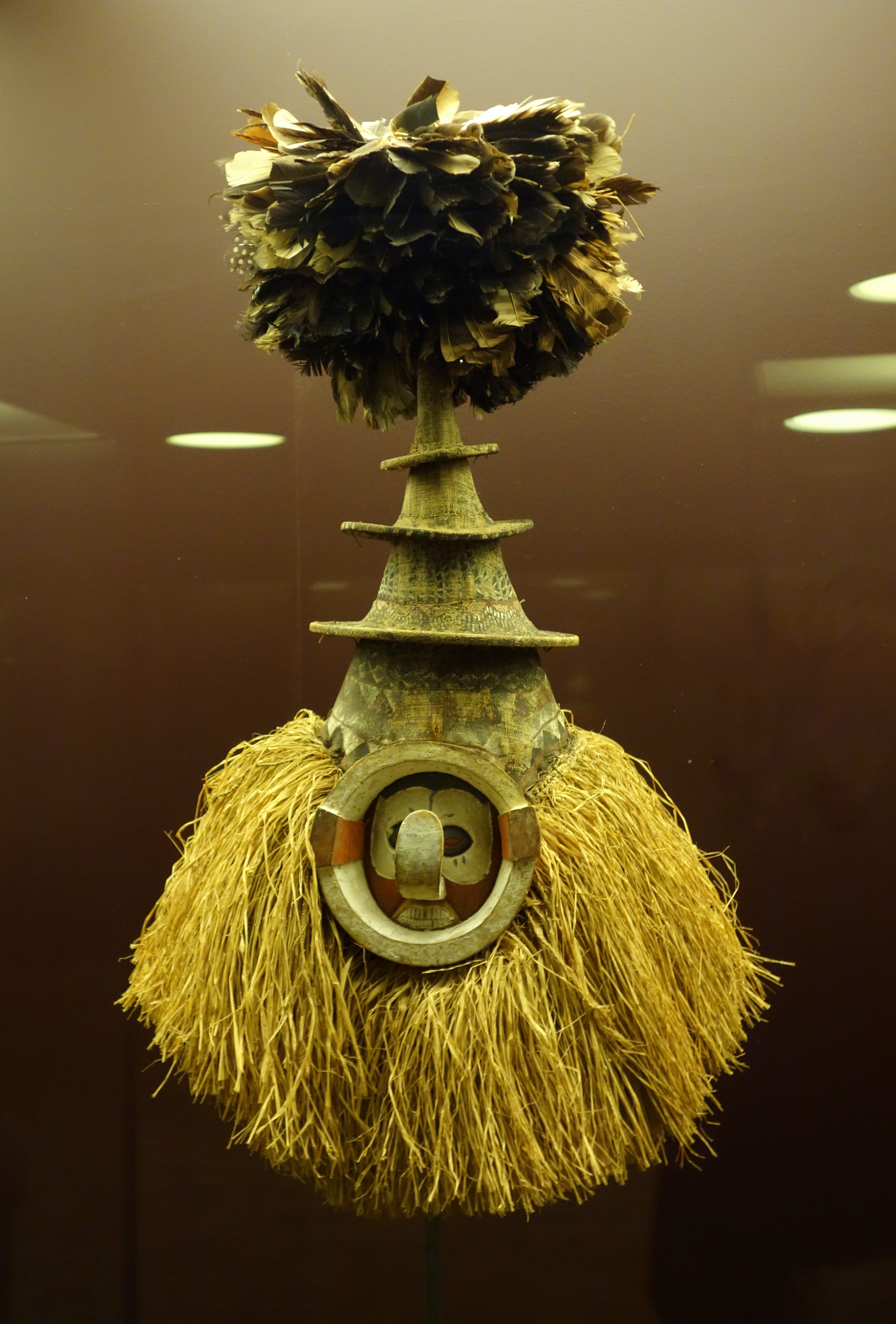
A Yaka nkanda mask (ndemba)

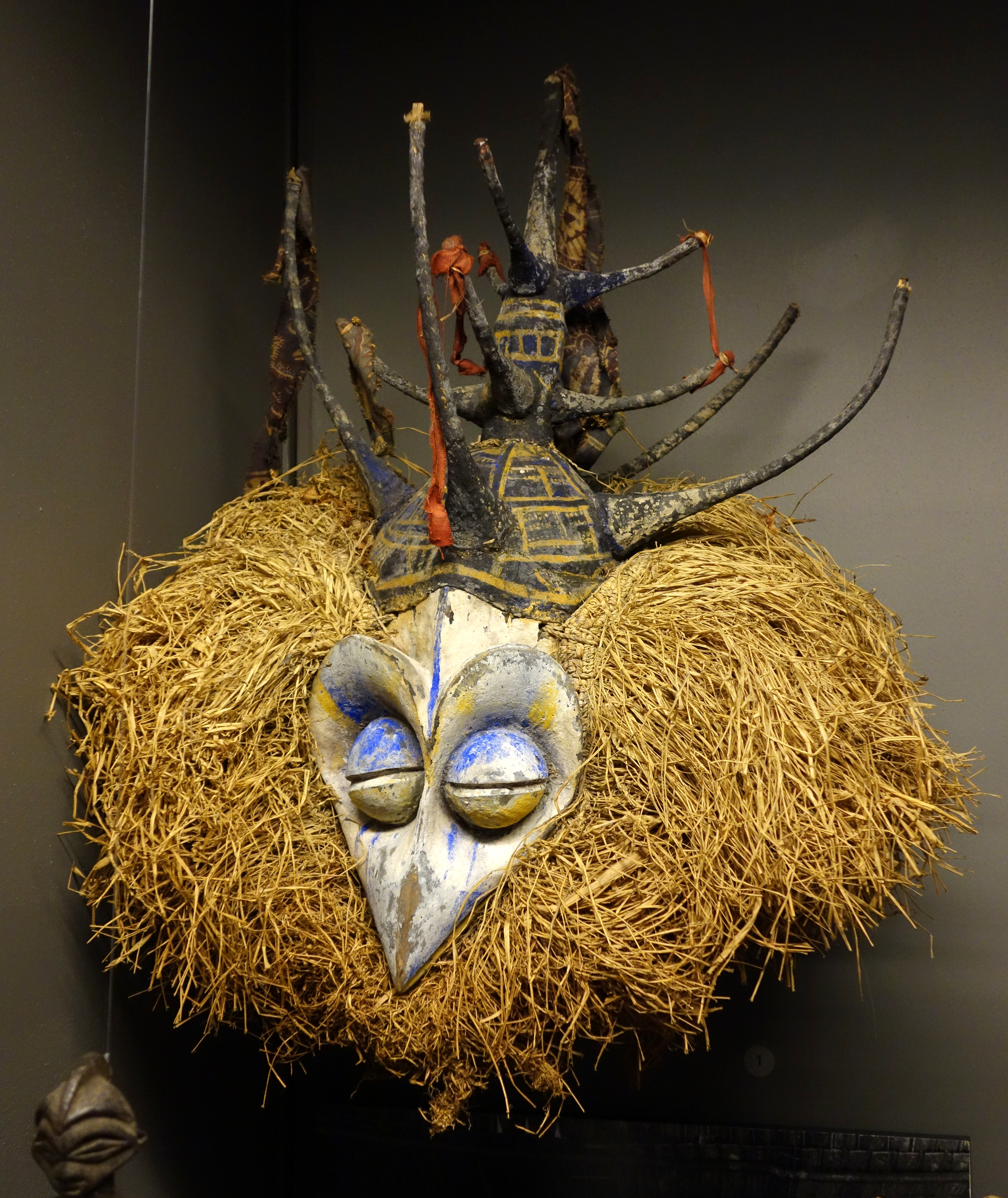
A Yaka mask

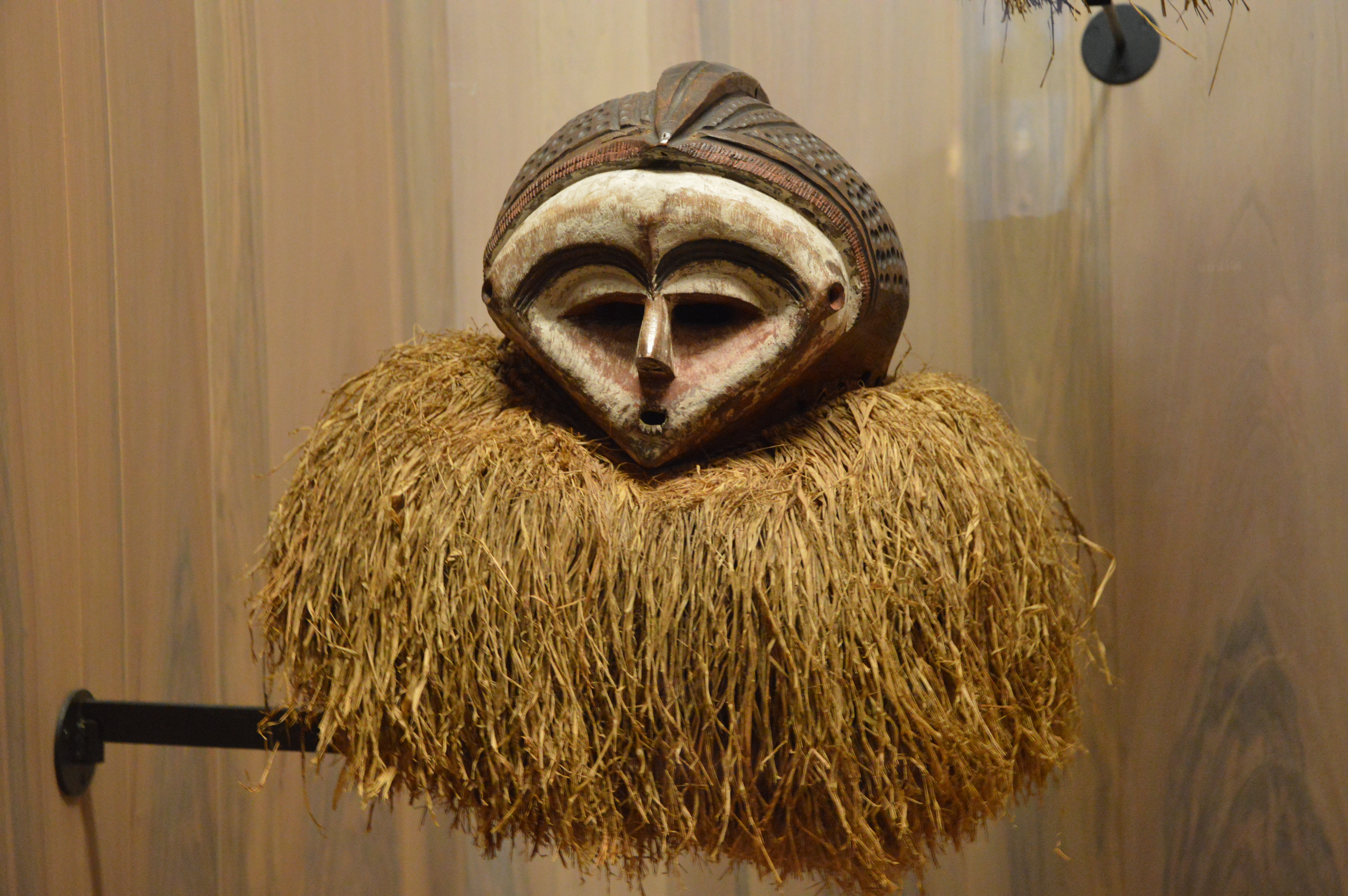
A Yaka mask

=== Statuettes ===
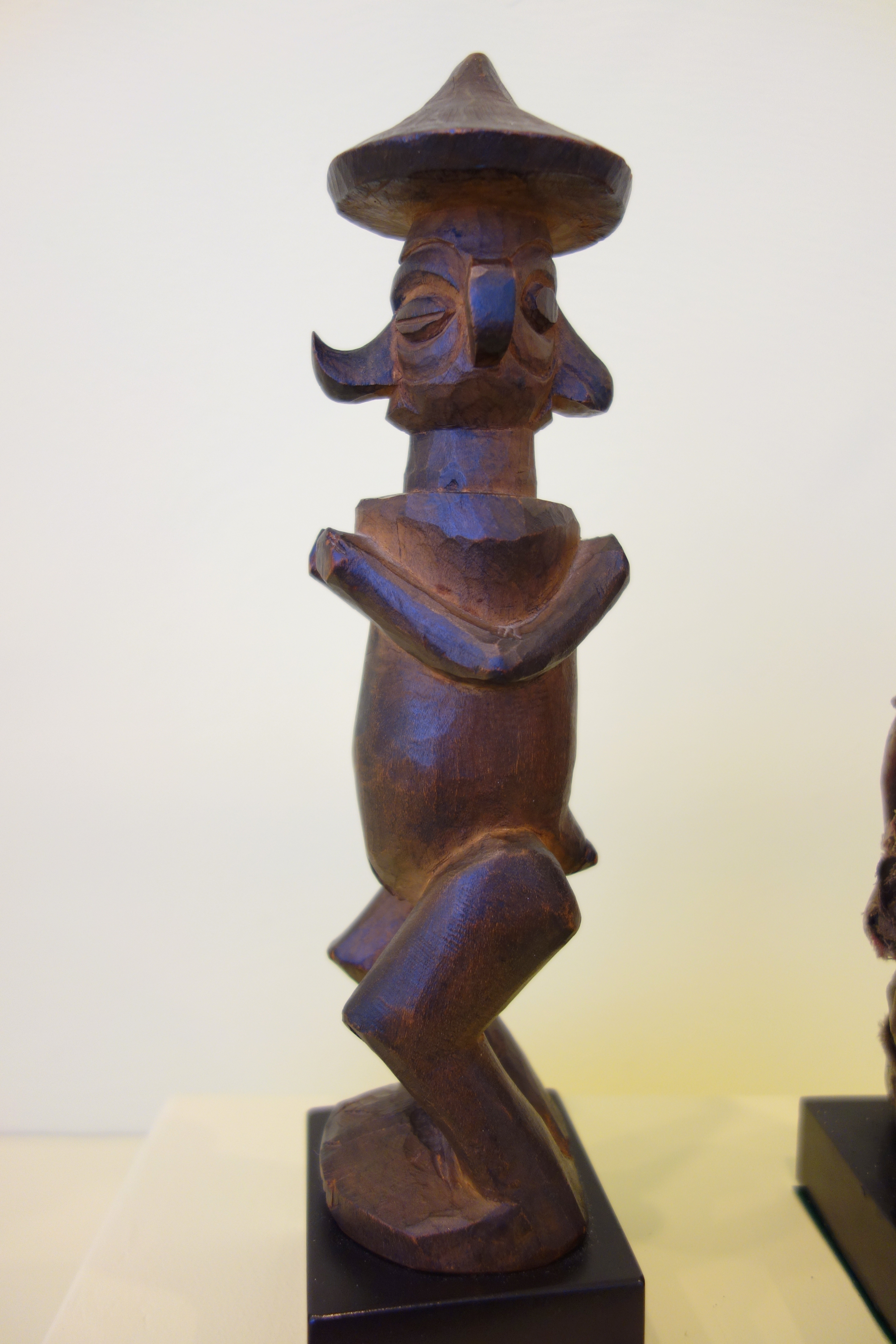
A Yaka mbwoolo statuette

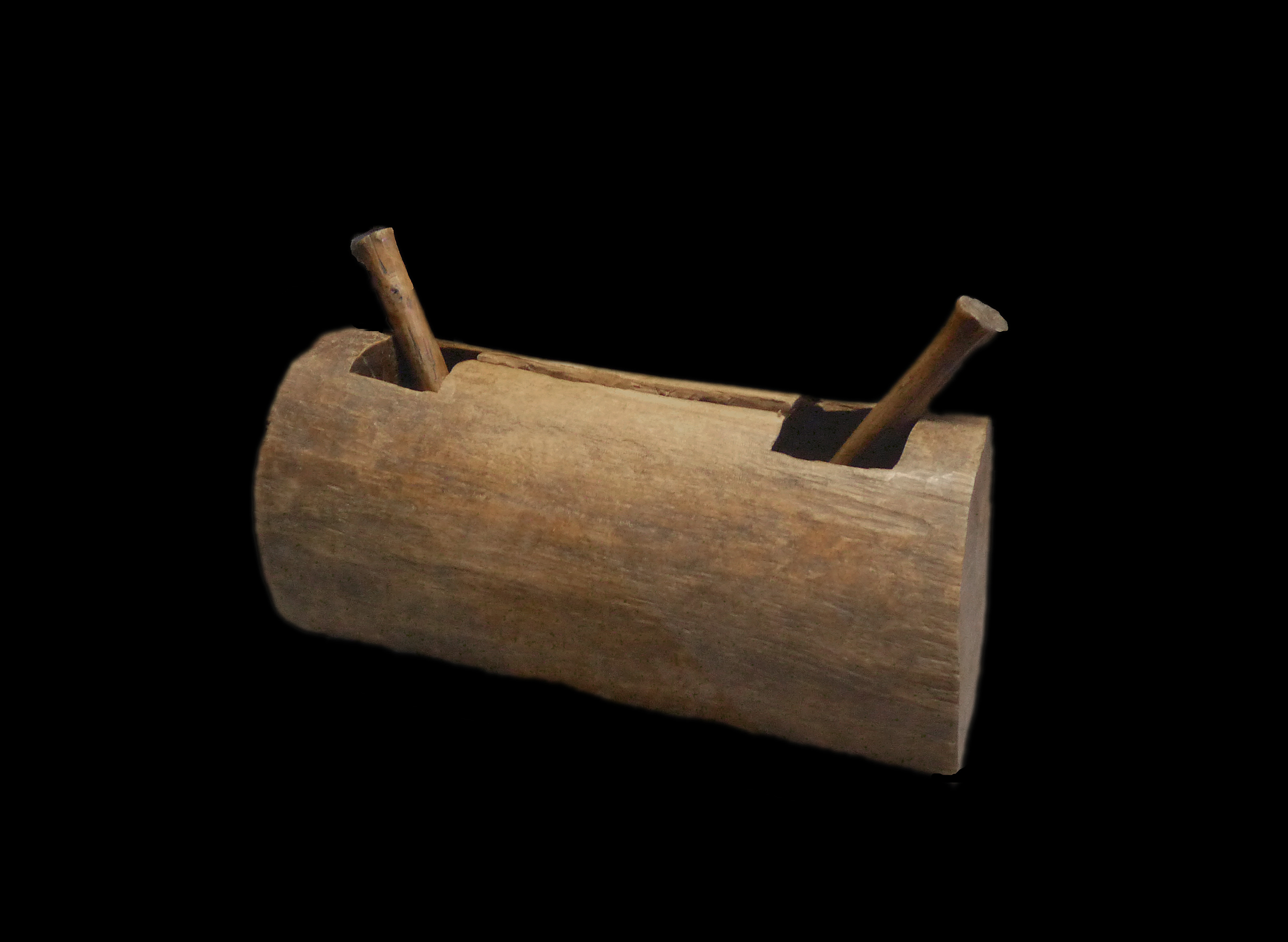
A carved Yaka Tambour (drum).

Yaka mbwoolo statuettes are typically carved from a single piece of wood and feature a highly abstracted human form, with arms and legs that are often thin and elongated, and small heads with simplified facial expressions. It is common for figures to be crafted in pairs and have missing limbs, swollen or spiraling torsos, and having multiple figures atop each other. They can be decorated with metal or glass beads, cowrie shells, and other adornments, which are believed to enhance their spiritual power.

The statuettes have widespread use in Yaka society. The statuettes are used to assist with interpreting dreams and communicating with the ancestors in divination rituals as it is believed the statues have the ability to provide insight into the past, present, and future. The statuettes are also used in healing rituals. They are rubbed with medicinal substances, or less often the substances were placed in the cavities in the figures’ abdomens, and are believed to have the power to cure diseases and ailments. They are also used in protection rituals to ward off evil spirits and to provide spiritual protection to individuals or communities. Without these, the statuettes have no meaning and are just waiting to be prepared with these substances.
