= Suku people =

Ethnic group of Central Africa

The Suku people or Basuku (plural) are an ethnic group of Bantu origin who traditionally inhabit the south-western Democratic Republic of the Congo and north-western Angola. As of 2017, there are believed to be about 200,000 people who identify as Suku, many living in the Congo's Kwango Province.

Suku society is matrilineal, and they speak the Suku language.

== Society and culture ==
The Suku people have many similarities in their culture to the Yaka people. Men and women each have their own tasks and roles. The men hunt either individually or together. Hunting involves high prestige and they hunt with a bow and arrow or an antique rifle. The women are the cultivators. They harvest yams, beans, peas, pineapple, and peanuts. They also collect and forage fruits, berries, and roots.

=== Religion ===
The Suku people do have a creator god, ndzambyaphuungu, who inhabits the sky and travels the breeze. They are the originator of life and death and the explanation to all occurrences and unanswerable questions. However, there is not a cult following nor are there depictions or representation of them.

The Suku and Yaka have a diviner called a ngoombu. They deal with clients that have had a misfortune, strange event, sickness or death. They require nziimbu shell money, coin, or piece of cloth of the victim to reveal where these problems are coming from.

=== Initiation ===
Initiation is the process Suku boys go through to reach manhood. They go to a camp site called mukhanda, or n-khanda among the Yaka. When there are enough boys that are uncircumcised, between the ages 10–15, for the initiation, the elders can then announce the initiation to begin. One month before the boys are sent away, relatives in the area are visited by the young candidates and give dances for traditional gifts. While this is happening, the sponsoring village is setting up the initiation site directed by a charm specialist. It involves special structures, masks, and sculpted posts that are covered in charms and medicines that barricade the initiation site. The formal opening of mukhanda takes place the day before the circumcision, they gather by a tree called mukaamba tree. If a candidate is judged appropriate the charm specialist shoots an arrow into the tree. If the arrow stays, they cut and carry the tree down to take it back to the village in male solidarity. The initiates will sing songs of mourning during this time, recalling the initiates' separation from their family and possible chance of death. The tree is placed in an open area of the village near the initiation camp and later in the day, the kakungu, m-bawa, and hemba masks appear for the festivities.

When the day of circumcising comes, it starts around 5 am with drums and the kakungu and mbawa appear again. The family of the initiates carries out the initiates on their shoulders to the mukkanga camp. The boy entitled kapita starts as the first one to be circumcised. The last boy to be circumcised is called mbaala. After the circumcision, the boys are left naked for a couple of days where they need to sleep close together on mats on the ground. They are forced to insult their sisters and parents as their food is thrown on the ground by the camp leaders. At sunrise and sunset they are forces to stand on one leg with the other foot on their knee with their arms outstretched. There are many food restrictions imposed and they are punished if they complain, break silence, make a mistake, or don't follow orders. The third day they sing as they go to the stream and clean their incisions. They will be presented with strengthening charms the next day. The charm specialist is positioning charms along the path and barricade leading to the mukhanda camp. The charms indicate that they will be no infections or mistreatment and keep away bad intent, and the masks help with that. When the incisions heal, after about three weeks, they can spend another one to three more years at the camp. This is where boys learn useful occupations like clearing fields, weaving mats, or cutting ground vines for rubber. There is a lot of storytelling, sex education, advice, and mannerism that are used in reaction to women. The hemba mask begins to appear near the end of the camp session for the Suku and its dance is taught to the initiates. When coming back from the camps, they seek the elder to get a kaolin which symbols peace and welcome. After this, the hemba masks dances as they burn the camp. After this, there is much dancing and celebration.

== Masks ==
=== Kakungu mask ===
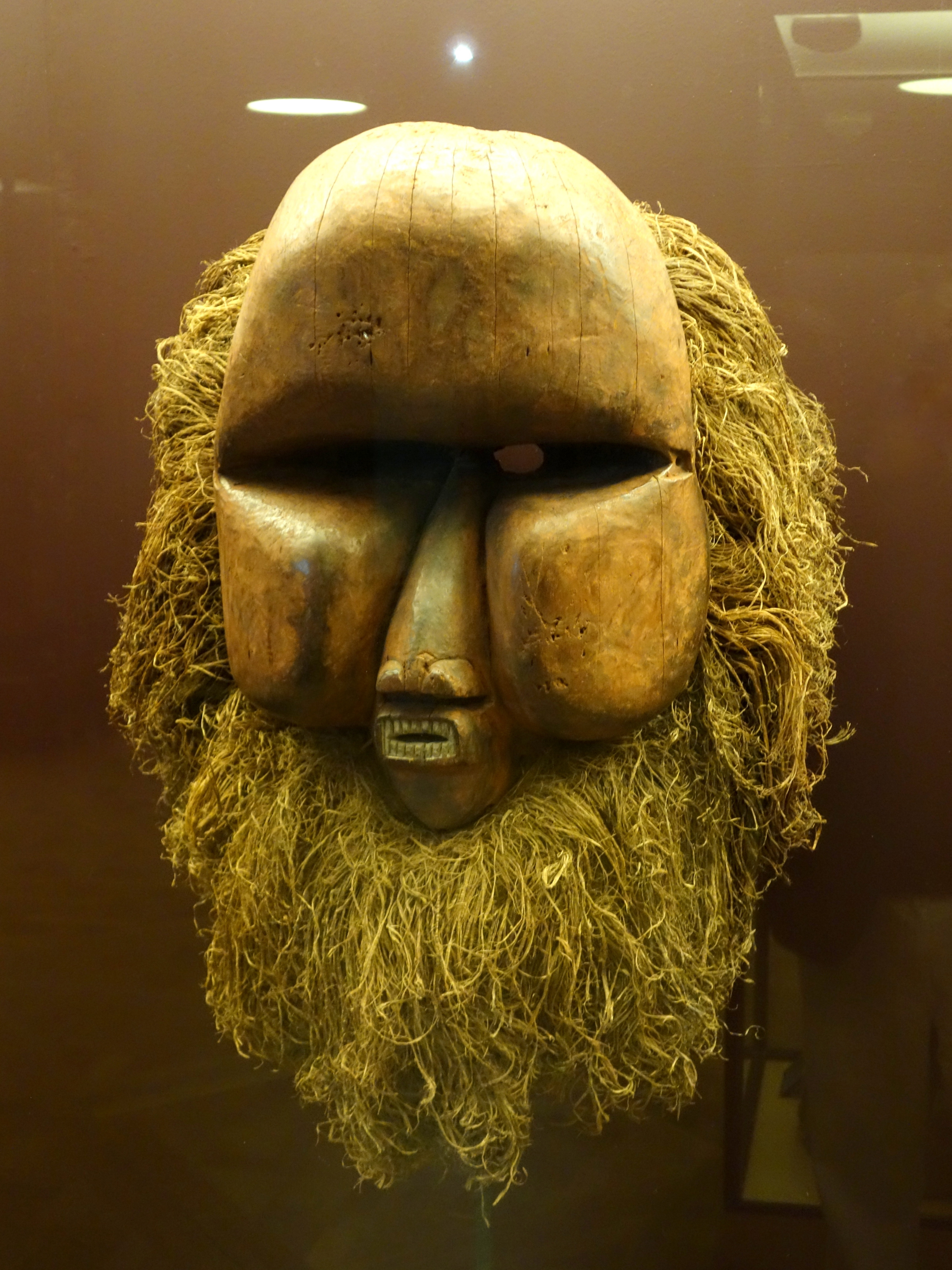
Kakungu mask

The kakungu are large masks around 84 centimeters high. They are characterized by their inflated cheeks, a prominent chin, and massive features. The basic colors used red and white each having their own meanings. The red meaning blood, vengeance, and evil, and white meaning blessings and health. It is made of soft wood called mengela or m'tsenga, and covered with skins of larger animals and full length raffia fringe strips.

The kakungu is considered the oldest and most powerful mask-charm. It is owned and worn by the charm specialist of the initiation camps. It is also used to ward off any person harboring evil intentions away from the camp. They appear during the day of circumcision, day of departure from the camp, and occasionally during a time of crisis, like to cure an initiate of infection or drive away a threatening storm. The kakungu has great jumping abilities that can make them travel fast between villages.

Before 2022, no masks of this type were present in Congo. The Belgian King Philppe handed a Kakungu mask originally in the Royal Museum for Central Africa to the Musée National de Kinshasa when he was visiting the country in June 2022.

=== M-bawa mask ===
The m-bawa mask is constructed from vines bound into a spherical structure then covered with raffia cloth. Its diameter is 100 centimeters around the head. There are two horns attached to the top either made of wood or actual animal horns. On the horns they paint white spots. Its appearance is associated with the mighty buffalo. They're used on the day of circumcision for the initiation, the going-out of the camp, and the breaking of food restriction. It doesn't often come out with the kakungu mask. It is also known for warding off rain, detecting pregnant women, terrorize, and control anti-social behavior, like the kakungu.

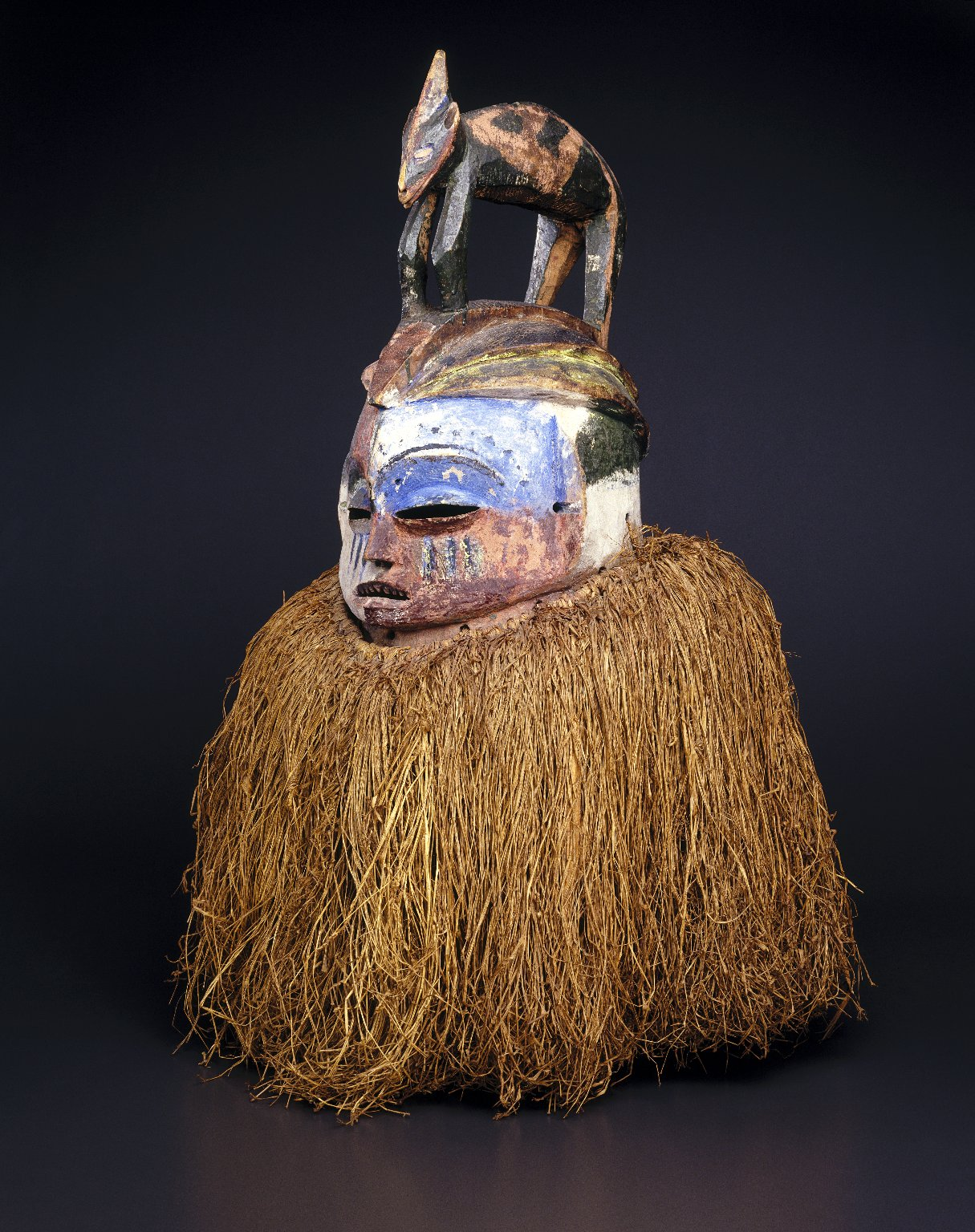
Hemba Mask

=== Hemba mask ===
The hemba mask is exclusive to the Suku people. It is made from a cylindrical piece of wood carved into a helmet shape or bell shape, and is worked into a human face and coiffure and raffia fringe covers around the face. A superstructure is frequently present carved into a single animal and rarely a single human figure on top of the mask. The coiffure has triangular decoration bands on it and is painted black with some areas a dull red. The face is painted white and marked by blue lines that descend from the lowered eyelids, and sometimes define a brow or nose ridge. Ts danced at the initiation camps when charms are introduced and when mukhanda is closing and is worn by the just initiated during the end. The hemba mask also helps women with gynecoid illness and cures those suffering from a hernia. It also helps with bad luck when hunting, while they dance for a blessing from the elder-ancestor. It is said to hold the collective image of all elders.

== Art ==
=== Slit drum (N’koku ngoombu) ===
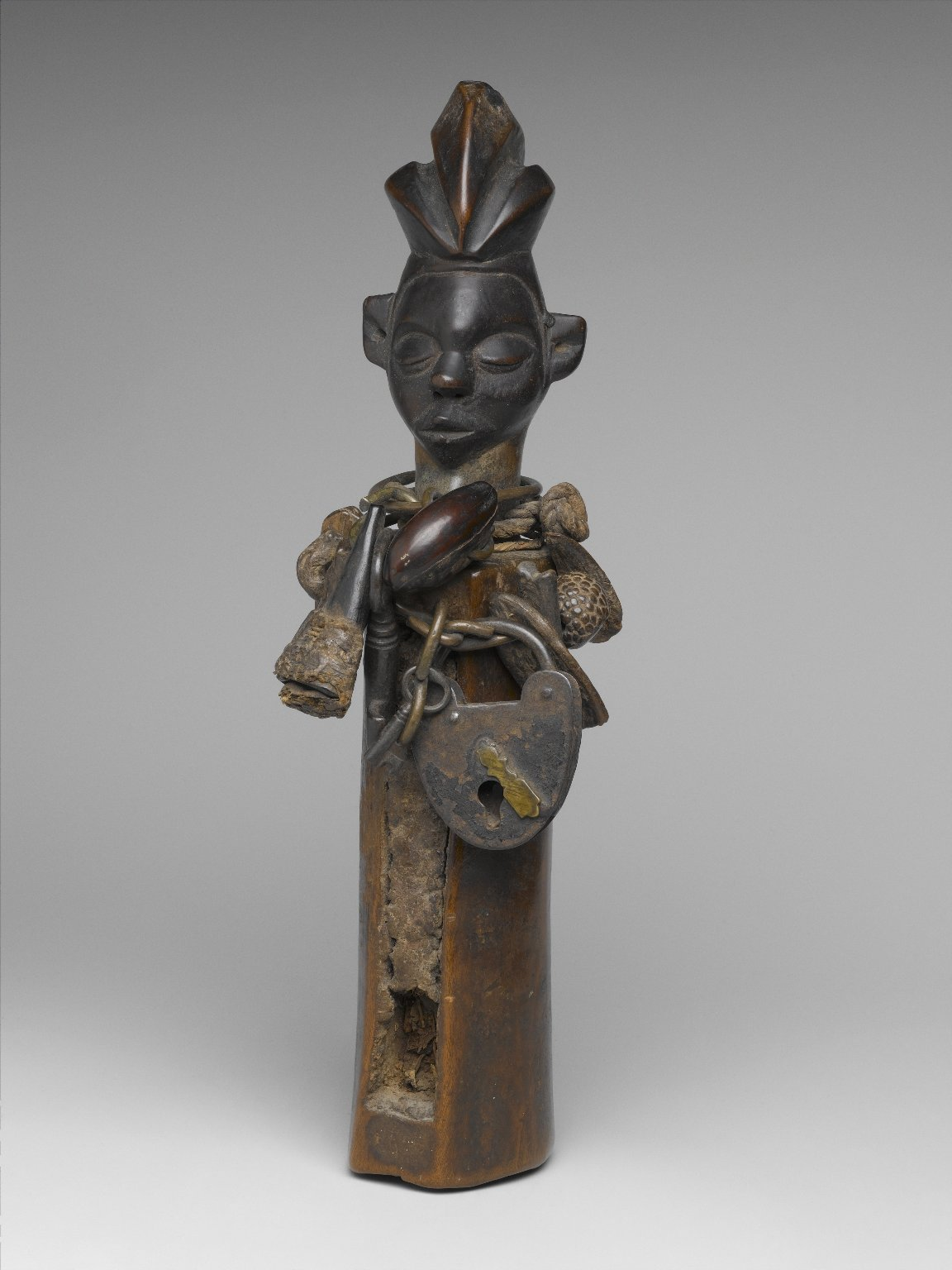
Slitdrum

N’koku ngoombu is a wooden slit-drum that has a carved human head on its handle. It is a distinct symbol for diviners and is sat on by them. The diviners slit drum is also used in preparing medicines.

=== Mbeedya phoko ===
The mbeedya phoko is a sword that shows leadership and a symbol for both paramount and regional chiefs. It is a broad double-bladed sword with a pointed metal hilt and an unusually shaped sheath. It signifies the powers, visible and invisible, of life and death. During ceremonies, it is welded during Lunda war-dance that recalls legendary battles and is finished by pointed toward the land of origin.

=== Statuettes (M-mbwoolu-tsyo) ===
These statuettes can be either a male or female figure in an upright posture. They each have variations in coiffure and headgear and relate to leadership and elders: Difference in the hair parting or how it is shaped, Bweni hats that have a rising crest and protruding knobs or a projecting brim distinctive of land-chiefs, Mpu skull caps of the regional chiefs in Suku. Another form is the kambaandzia miter-like form that looks like a pointed cone. All of these seem to be the symbols of leadership and authority but the headgear refers to older leaders. Stances and gestures can also be interpreted. Hands-to-chin gesture common signifies reflection, sadness, and grief with both the Yaka and Suku people. Both hands together at the upper chin gesture can pertain to a person confessing guilt or swearing secrecy.

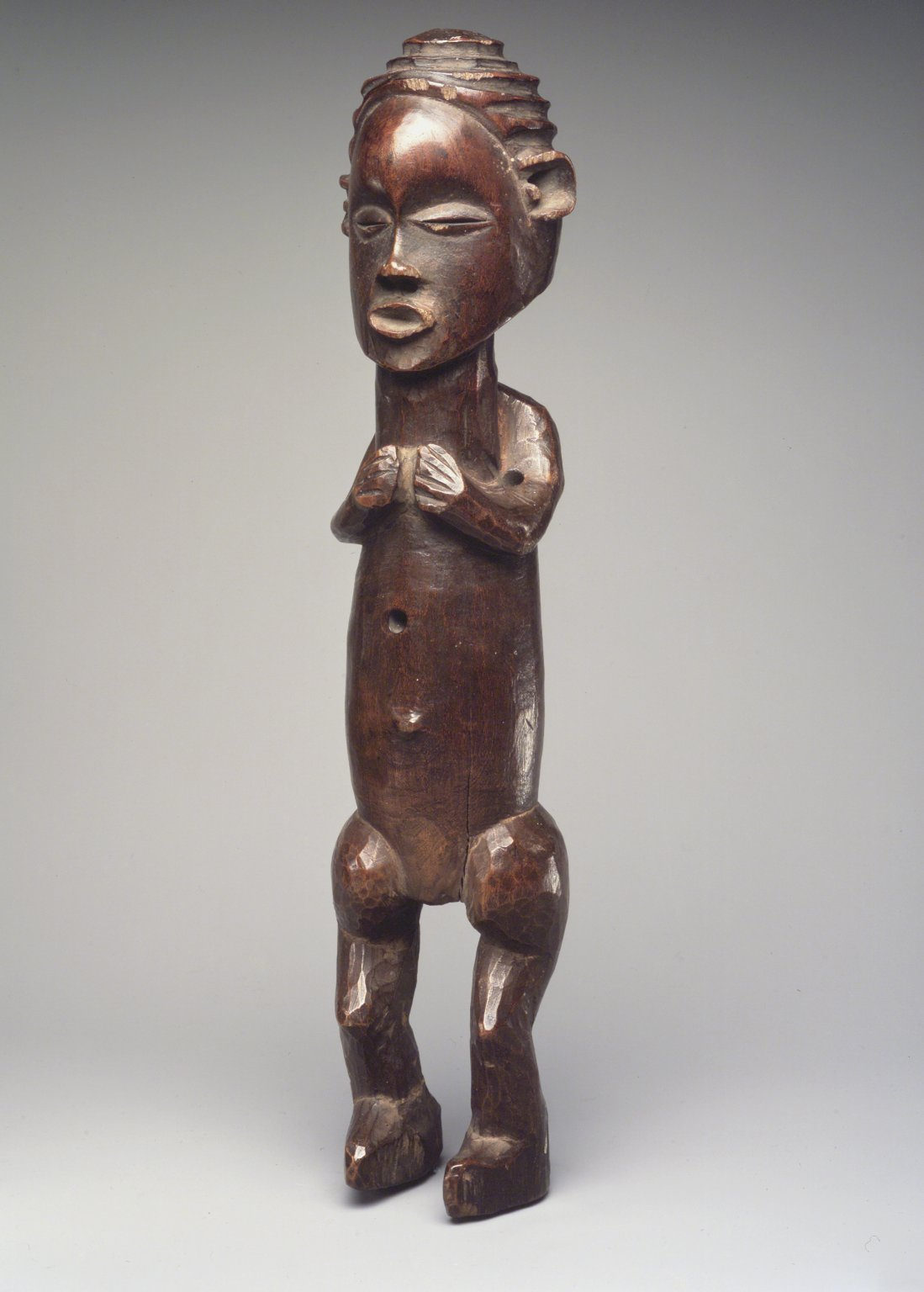
Suku figure, 19th century

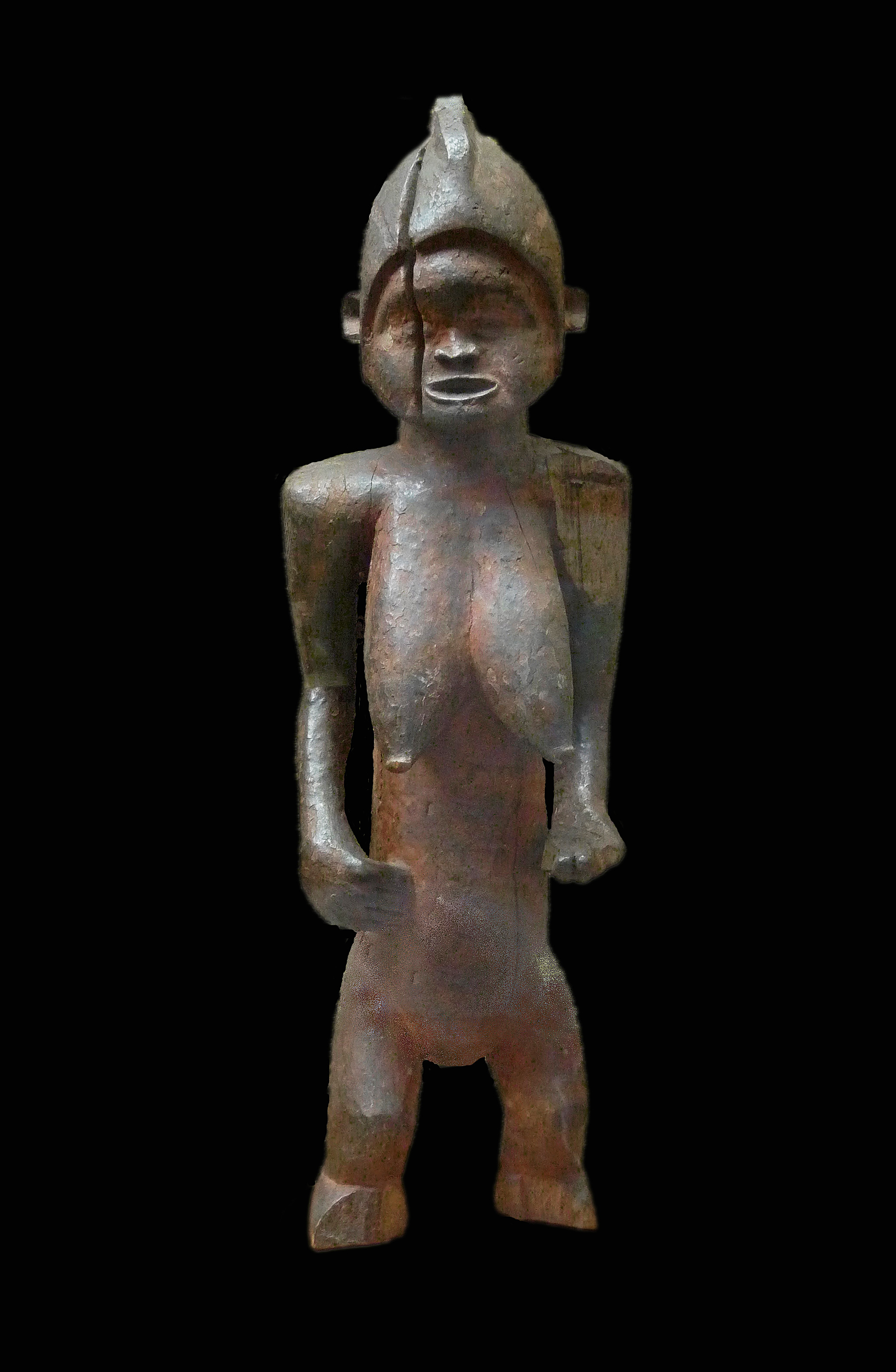
Statuette of a woman
