= Lake Mboukou =

- Lac Mboukou (French)
- Location in the Republic of the Congo
- Location: Republic of the Congo
- Coordinates: 0°57′N 17°22′E
- Basin countries: Republic of the Congo
- Max. length: 1.4 km (0.87 mi)
- Max. width: 0.6 km (0.37 mi)
- Surface elevation: 312 m (1,024 ft)

Lake Mboukou (French: Lac Mboukou) is a freshwater lake in Epena District, Republic of the Congo.

== Description ==
It is a small lake located roughly 50 km to the southeast from Lake Tele at 0°57′5″N 17°22′45″E in the north-eastern area of the Republic of the Congo. Lake Mboukou is almost totally surrounded by forest except in its SW shore where the village of Mboukou is located.

== Local significance ==
The 1996 book Congo Journey, by the British travel writer Redmond O'Hanlon, mentions this lake as a place with strong spirits according to the local people.

== Ecology ==
This lake belongs to the 4,389.6 km^{2} (1,694.8 sq mi) wetland area of the Réserve Communautaire du Lac Télé/Likouala-aux-Herbes. It is a Ramsar site since 18 July 1998.
