= Johannes Vogel (botanist) =

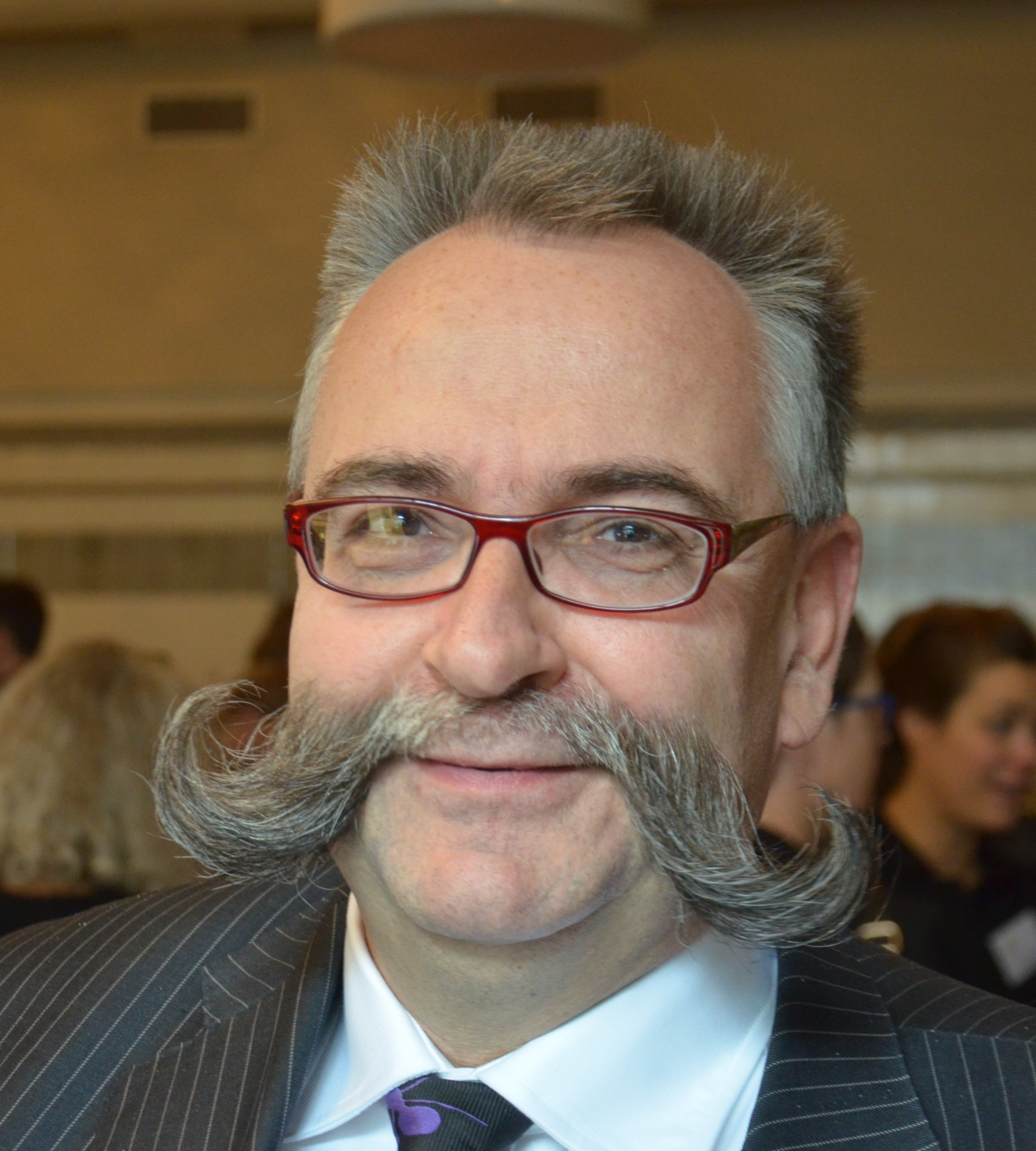
Johannes Vogel

Johannes Christian Vogel FLS FAAAS (born 15 May 1963) is a German botanist, who since 1 February 2012 has been Director General of the Museum für Naturkunde and Professor of Biodiversity and Public Science at Humboldt University, both in Berlin. He previously held the post of Keeper of Botany at the Natural History Museum in the United Kingdom from 2004 to 2012.

== Biography ==
He was educated at Bielefeld University and Peterhouse, Cambridge. From 1982 to 1984 Vogel was a professional soldier in the armed forces of the Federal Republic of Germany.

In 2003 he married Sarah Darwin, a great-great-granddaughter of the naturalist Charles Darwin; they have two sons Leo Erasmus Darwin Vogel (born 2003) and Josiah Algy Darwin Vogel (born 2005). In 2009/10 the family were part of a recreation of Darwin's voyage on the Beagle for the Dutch TV show Beagle: In Darwin's Wake (Dutch: Beagle: In het kielzog van Darwin) on board of the sailing ship Stad Amsterdam.

Vogel is a Fellow of the American Association for the Advancement of Science (AAAS) (2010).
