= Meet the Future, Science & Technology Summit 2010 =

Science and technology convention in The Hague, Netherlands

Coordinates: 52.092360°N 4.283044°E

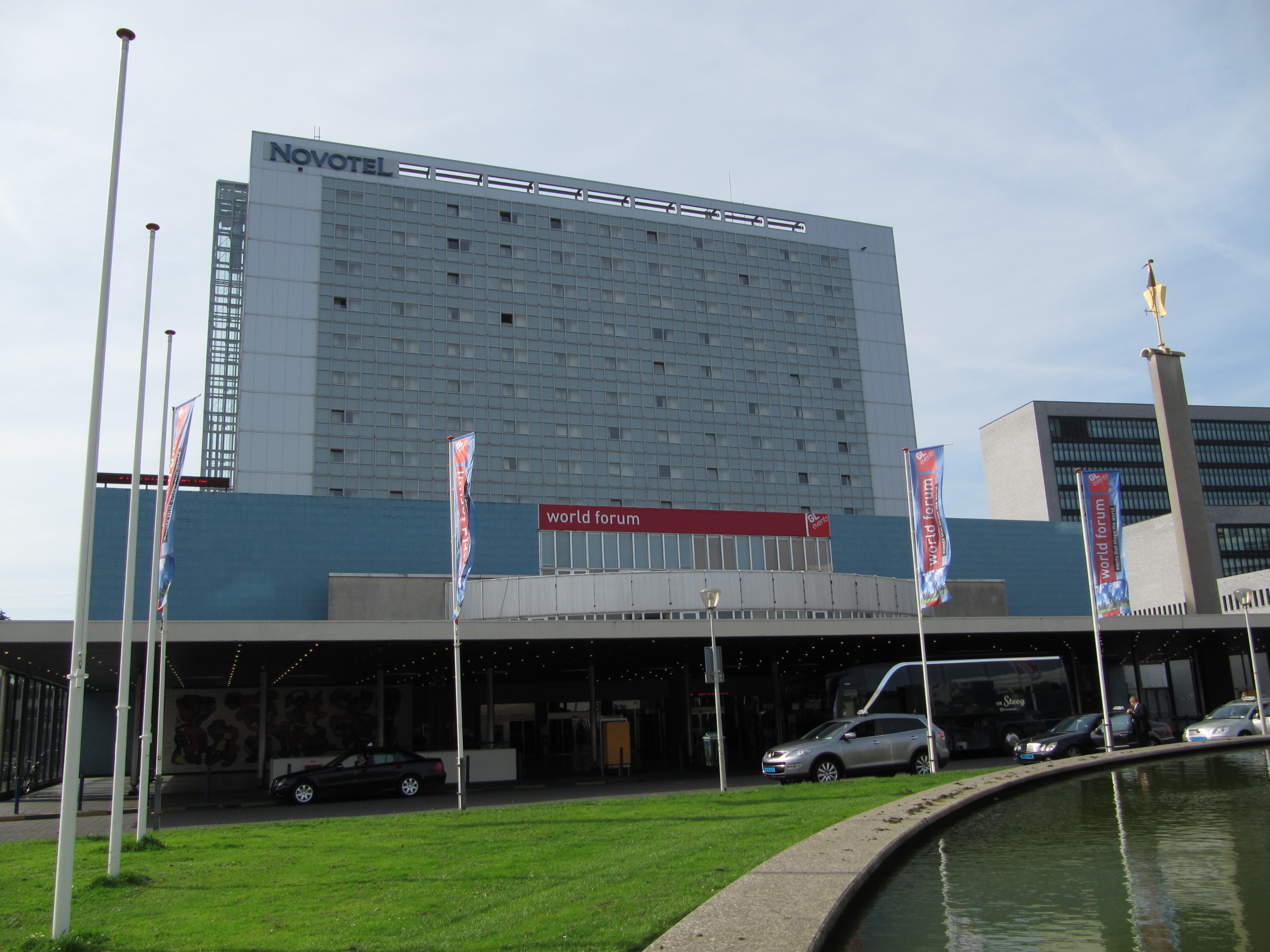
The World Forum Convention Center in The Hague, site of the summit

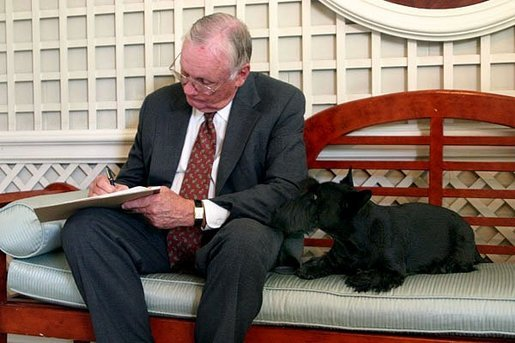
Neil Armstrong

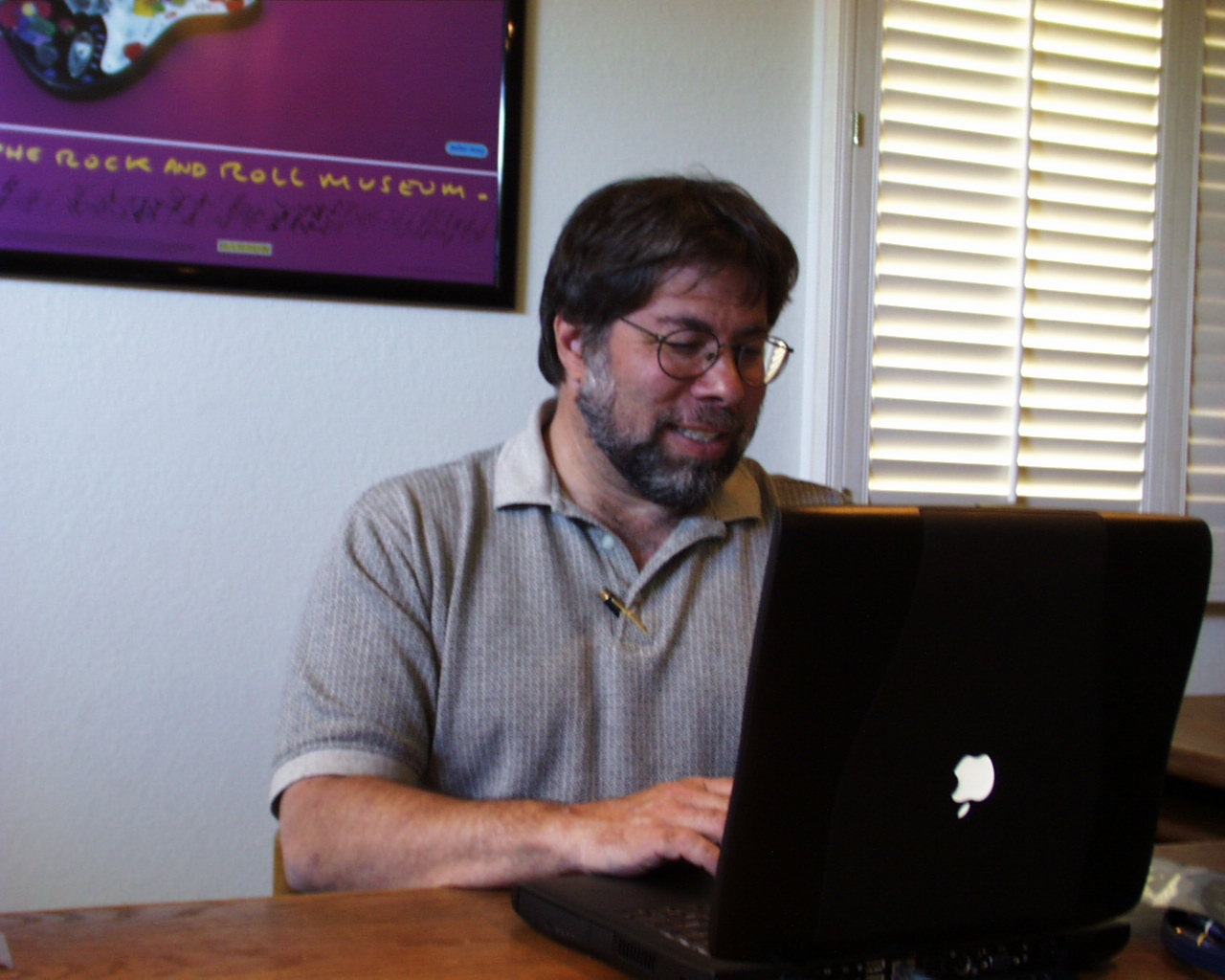
Steve Wozniak

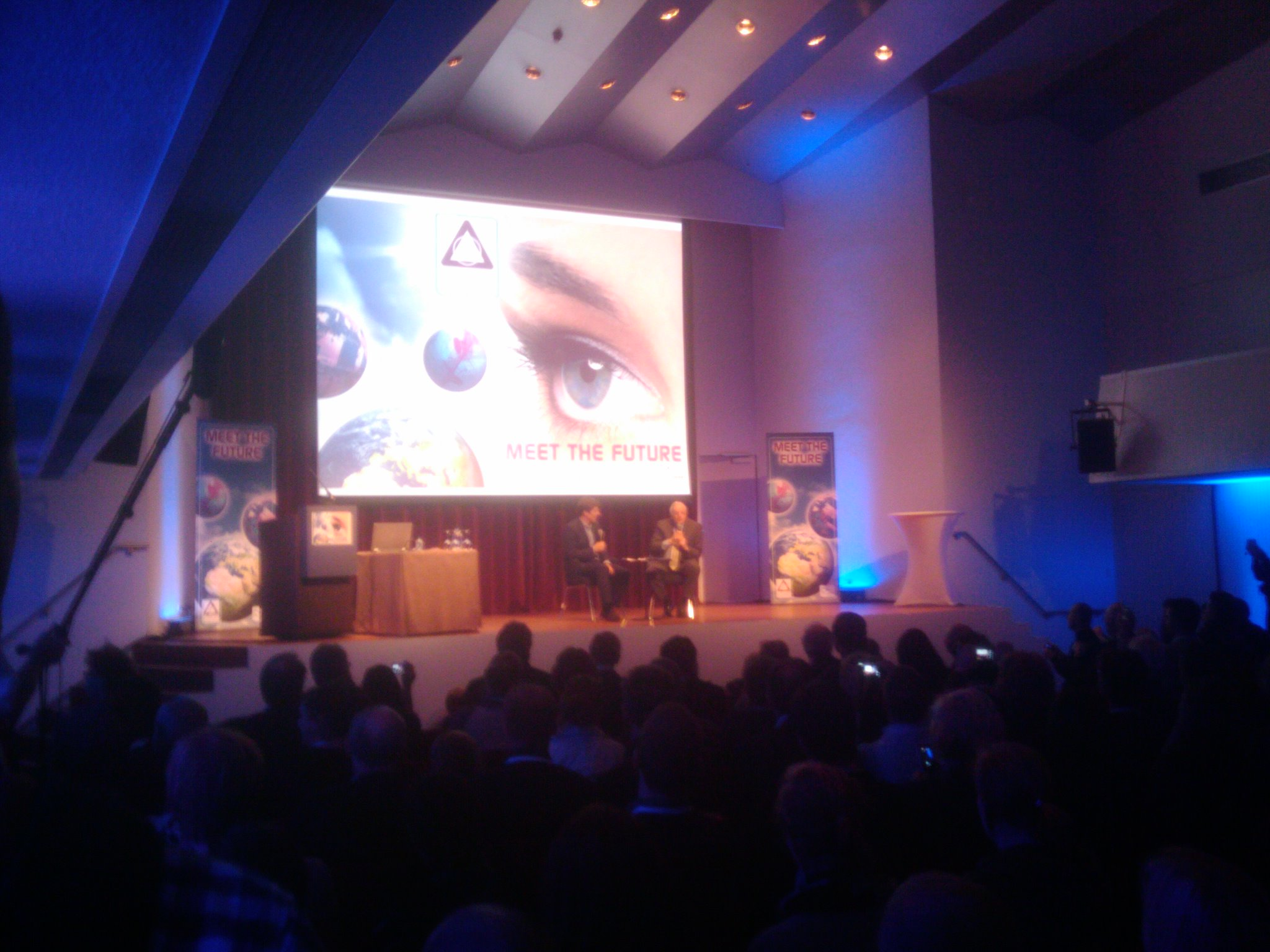
Debate with Neil Armstrong (on the right)

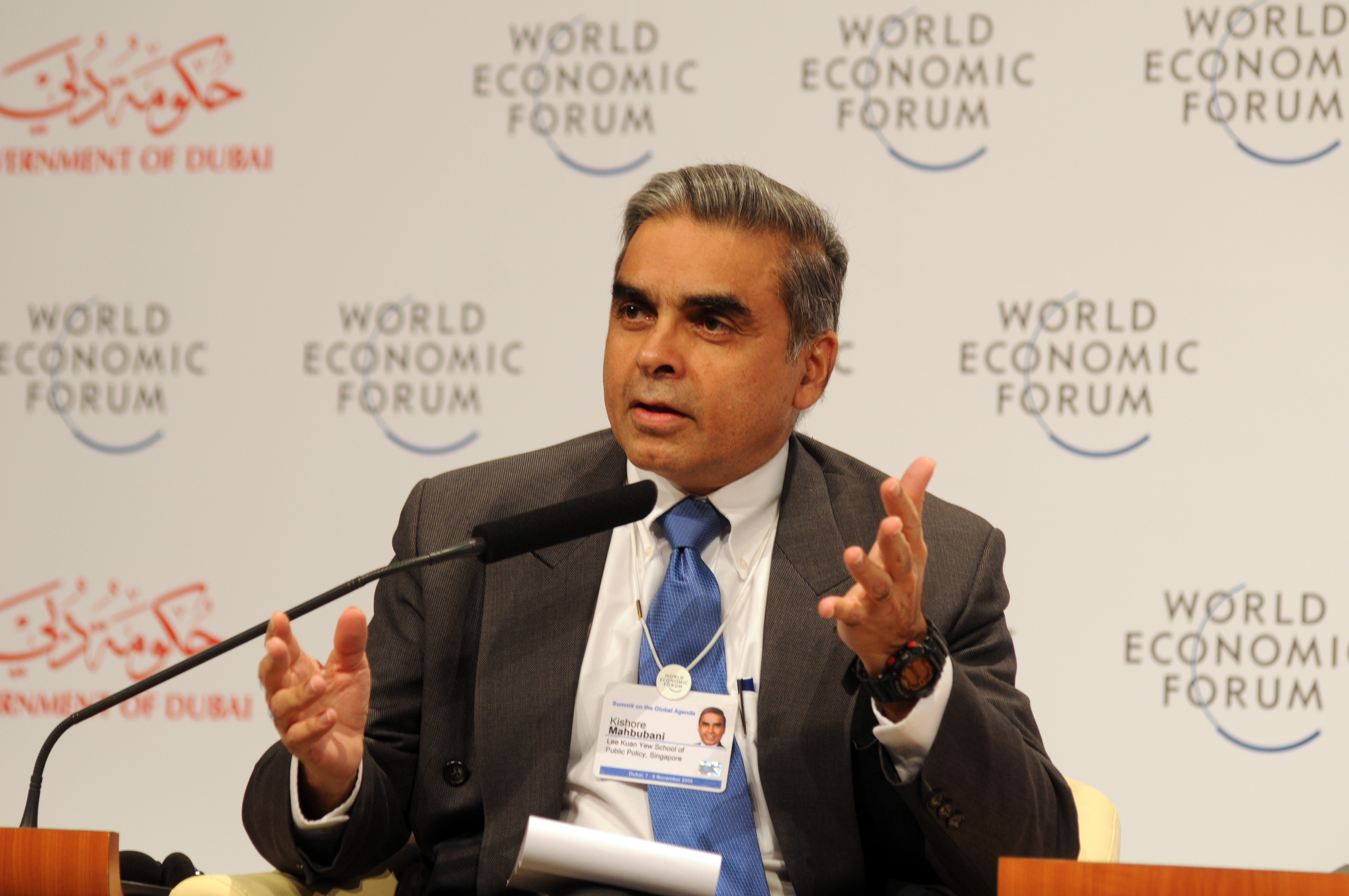
Kishore Mahbubani

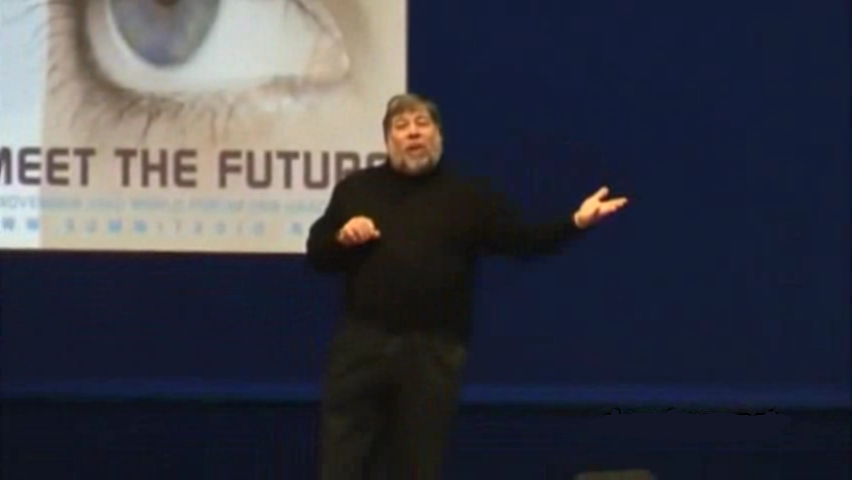
Keynote speech by Steve Wozniak

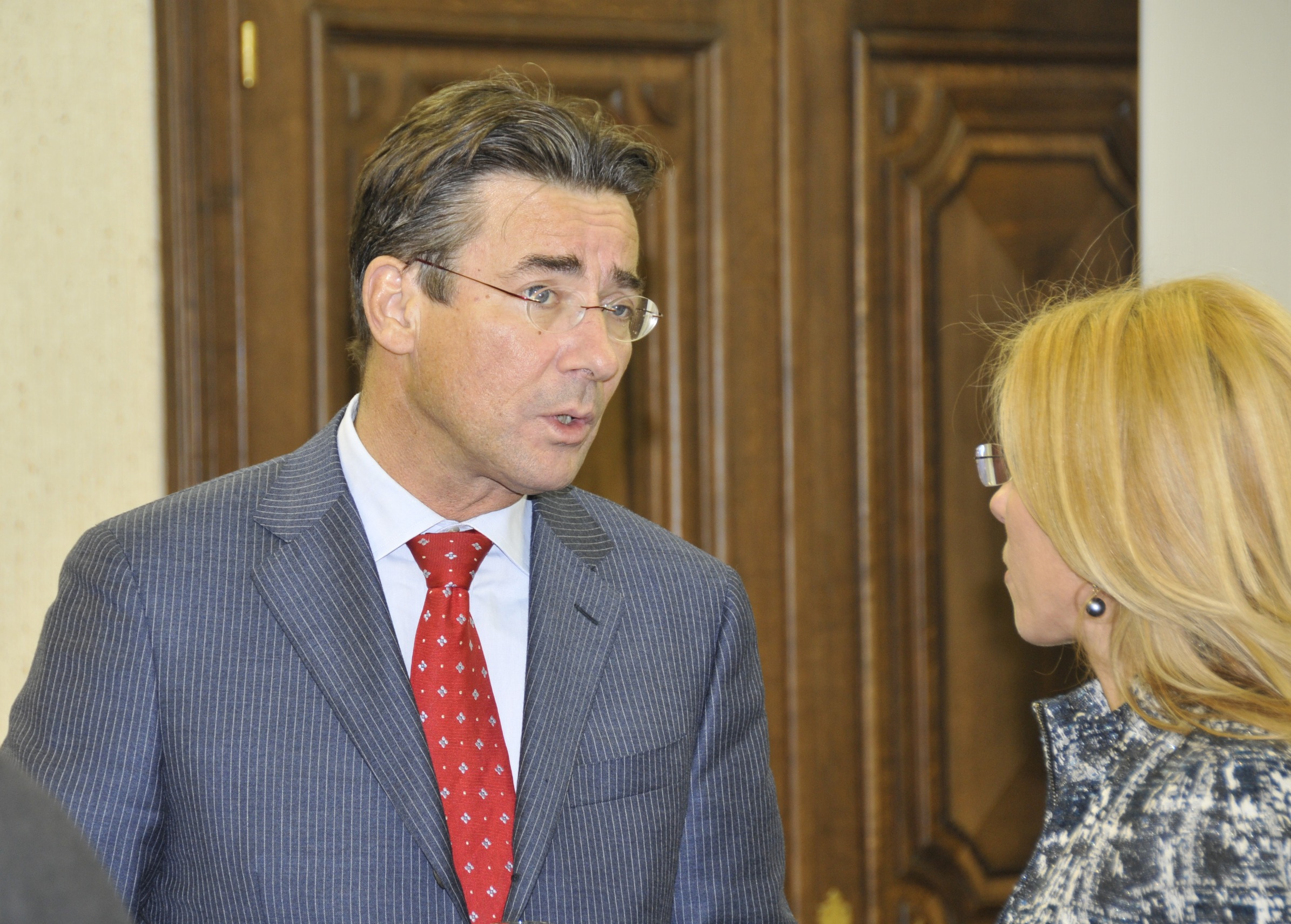
Maxime Verhagen

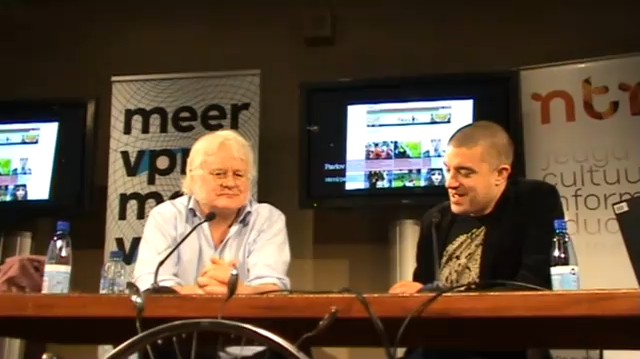
Redmond O'Hanlon (on the left) is interviewed by a Dutch reporter of the VPRO

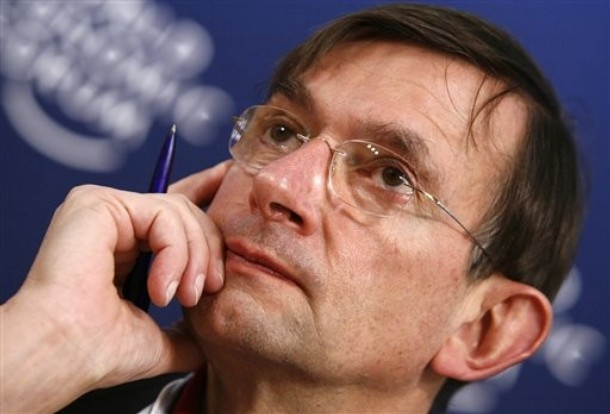
Jeroen van der Veer

Video impression of the summit

Meet the Future, Science & Technology Summit 2010 was a one-day science and technology convention held at the World Forum Convention Center in The Hague, Netherlands on November 18, 2010, organized by Platform Bèta Techniek (PBT), an organization which has been empowered by the Dutch government to increase the number of beta students in the Netherlands.

The summit offered Dutch science and technology related companies and educational institutions an opportunity to showcase their latest products, research and developments.

There was a gathering with selected international guests on the following day (November 19).

== Notable guests ==
There were keynote speeches by several famous and influential persons such as Neil Armstrong (who said in his speech that he would offer his services as commander on a mission to Mars, if he was asked, even though he was 80 years old at the time), Steve Wozniak (who predicted in his speech that Android would be dominant over the iPhone market-wise but the iPhone would retain the quality edge), Spencer Wells (geneticist and anthropologist and professor at Cornell University), Robbert Dijkgraaf (president of the Royal Netherlands Academy of Arts and Sciences) and Kishore Mahbubani (professor at the National University of Singapore).

Other prominent guests were Sarah Darwin (biologist and great-great-granddaughter of Charles Darwin) and author Redmond O'Hanlon, who had both featured in the Dutch VPRO television series Beagle: In Darwin's wake (Beagle: In het kielzog van Darwin), Olympic gold medal swimmer Pieter van den Hoogenband, and also Jeroen van der Veer (chairman of Platform Bèta Techniek and former Shell CEO) and Maxime Verhagen (Dutch Minister of Economic Affairs, Agriculture and Innovation and Deputy Prime Minister), who was presented with the results of the Deltaplan Bèta Techniek, which lists measures to increase the participation of students in technical studies.

== Criticism ==
There was criticism by science journalist Hidde Boersma that the summit painted a too rosy picture of the efforts by the Platform Bèta Techniek to interest young people to take up a technical education.

Although he also noted that many schools used the Summit as a study day for their students and thus the summit could still help to achieve the PBT's goals of increasing the participation in technical studies by inspiring students.
