= Sarah Darwin =

English botanist

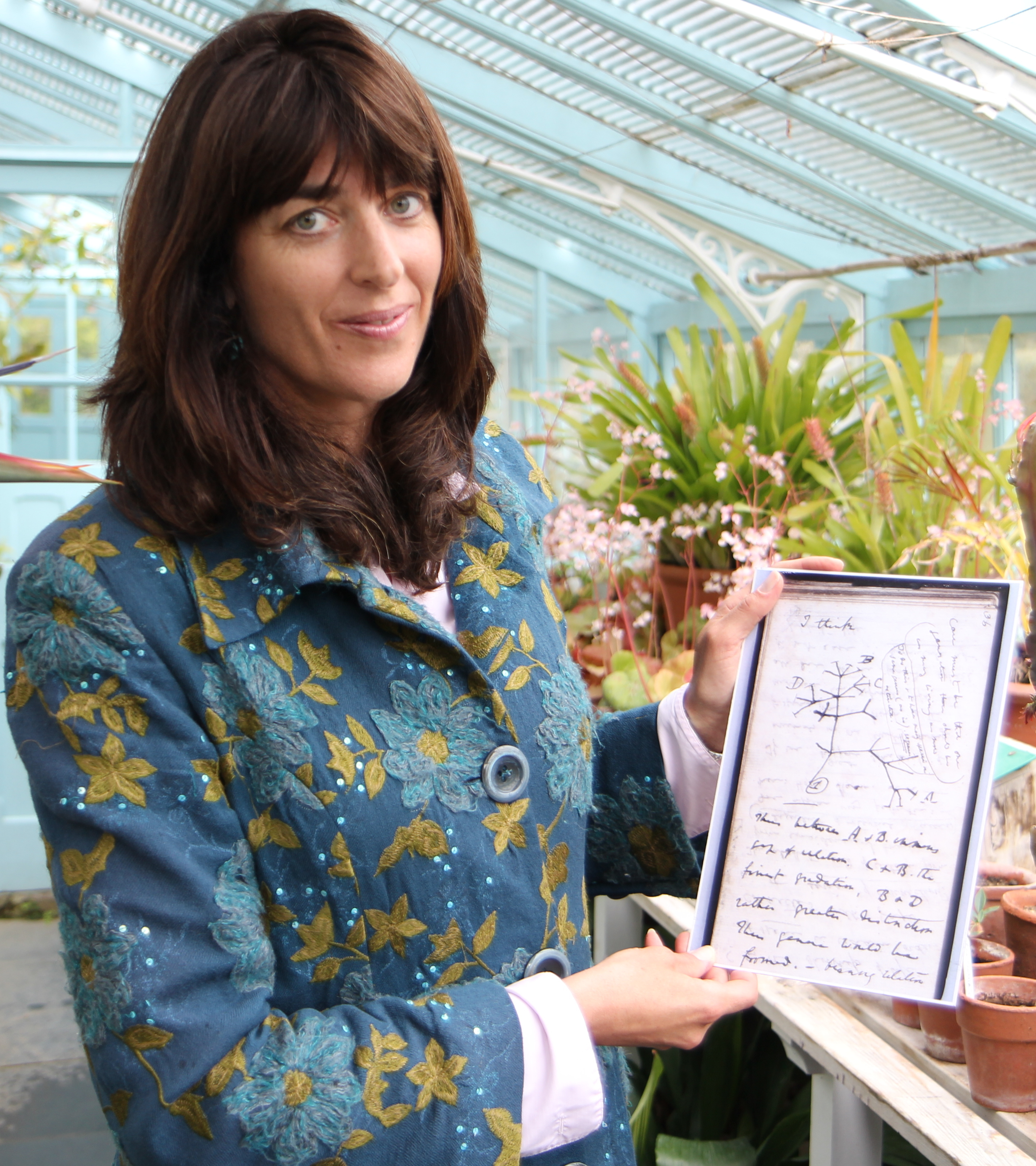
- Sarah Darwin in 2012
- Born: 1 April 1964 (age 61); London, UK
- Spouse: Johannes Vogel
- Children: 2

Sarah Catherine Darwin FLS (born 1 April 1964) is a British botanist.

== Education and career ==
Darwin earned a BSc in Botany from Reading University in 1999 and a PhD from University College London in 2009. Her PhD thesis was entitled The systematics and genetics of tomatoes on the Galápagos Islands. Her supervisors were Sandra Knapp, James Mallet and Ziheng Yang.

Darwin first visited the Galapagos Islands in 1995 with her parents and brother Chris on holiday. She stayed behind to prepare botanical illustrations for a field guide to the Islands. She is an ambassador for the conservation charity Galapagos Conservation Trust. She wrote a foreword for the 2009 book Galapagos: Preserving Darwin's Legacy by Tui de Roy.

In 2009, Darwin was reported in various media outlets as having "won" a "talking to plants competition" against ten others. In the experiment, tomato plants grew the most when subjected to Darwin reading extracts from The Origin of Species.

She appeared in the 2009–10 Dutch VPRO television series Beagle: In Darwin's wake in which she, with her husband and children, along with others such as Redmond O'Hanlon, participated in a recreation of Charles Darwin's voyage on HMS Beagle on board of the sailing ship Stad Amsterdam. She attended the Science & Technology Summit at the World Forum Convention Center in The Hague on 18 November 2010, at which O'Hanlon was also a featured guest.

== Family ==
Darwin is the daughter of George Erasmus Darwin, a metallurgist, and his wife Shuna (née Service). She has two older brothers; Robert George Darwin (born 1959) and the conservationist Chris Darwin (born 1961). She is descended from Charles Darwin via Charles's son George Howard Darwin (1845–1912), an astronomer, his son William Robert Darwin (1894–1970), a stockbroker and brother of the physicist Charles Galton Darwin, and his wife Sarah Monica (née Slingsby) were the parents of George Erasmus Darwin (1927–2017).

She has been married to German botanist Johannes Vogel, former Keeper of Botany at the Natural History Museum and now Director General of the Museum für Naturkunde in Berlin, since 2003, with whom she has two sons, Leo Erasmus Darwin Vogel (born 2003) and Josiah Algy Darwin Vogel (born 2005).

In 2005 the family, along with other descendants of Charles Darwin, including George Erasmus Darwin and Chris Darwin, were involved in counting the flowers at Down House.

== See also ==
- Darwin–Wedgwood family
