= Lake Tele =

Lake in the Republic of the Congo

- Lac Télé (French)
- Location in the Republic of the Congo
- Location: Republic of the Congo
- Coordinates: 1°20′N 17°9′E
- Basin countries: Republic of the Congo
- Max. length: 6.2 km (3.9 mi)
- Max. width: 4.9 km (3.0 mi)
- Average depth: 4 m (13 ft)
- Surface elevation: 319 m (1,047 ft)

Lake Tele (French Lac Télé) is a freshwater lake in Epena District, Republic of the Congo.

== Description ==
Located at 1°20′N 17°9′E in the north-eastern area of the Republic of the Congo, Lake Tele was formed in Pliocene alluvial sediments by an unknown geological process. It is elliptical, almost round, in shape and is surrounded by the Likouala-aux-Herbes swamp forests which are gradually covering it.

There are no significant inlets or outlets in the lake. The water of Lake Tele is turbid, it has high content of organic materials and is acidic (pH < 4). The swamp forests around the lake have not yet been exhaustively explored.

== Legends ==
Lake Tele is the best known home of the Mokèlé-mbèmbé (purportedly a large, unidentified reptilian creature), and is also supposedly the spot where pygmies killed and ate one of the creatures, around 1959.

The 1996 book Congo Journey, by British travel writer Redmond O'Hanlon, describes in some detail his journey through Congo to Lake Tele in search of Mokèlé-mbèmbé, as well as giving a rich description of local fauna, flora and Congolese cultural practices and relations with the indigenous Pygmy peoples.

== Ecology ==
The 4,389.6 km^{2} (1,694.8 sq mi) wetland area of the Réserve Communautaire du Lac Télé/Likouala-aux-Herbes. It is a Ramsar site since 18 July 1998.

Surveys conducted by the Wildlife Conservation Society in 2006 and 2007 found more than 100,000 previously unreported gorillas have been living in the swamp forests of Lake Tele Community Reserve and in neighbouring Marantaceae (dryland) forests in the Republic of the Congo.

== See also ==
- Lake Mboukou

== Bibliography ==
- Alain Laraque, Bernard Pouyaud, Isabelle Chaffaut, Jean-Marie Moutsambote, Bienvenu Maziezoula, Claude Censier, Yves Albouy, Hilaire Elenga, Henri Etchebe, Mireille Delaune, Francis Sondag and Françoise Gasse (1997). "Reconnaissance scientifique du lac Télé (Nord-Congo) —Premiers résultats et interprétations". Comptes Rendus de l'Académie des Sciences, Série IIA. 325 (1): 49–56. Bibcode:1997CRASE.325...49L. doi:10.1016/S1251-8050(97)83272-7.
- Alain Laraque; Bernard Pouyaud; Robert Rocchia; Eric Robin; Isabelle Chaffaut; Jean Marie Moutsambote; Bienvenu Maziezoula; Claude Censier; Yves Albouy; Hilaire Elenga; Henri Etcheber; Mireille Delaune; Francis Sondag; Françoise Gasse (1998). "Origin and function of a closed depression in equatorial humid zones: The Lake Télé in North Congo". Journal of Hydrology. 207 (3–4): 236–253. Bibcode:1998JHyd..207..236L. doi:10.1016/S0022-1694(98)00137-1.
