= Anthony Smith (sculptor) =

British sculptor (born 1984)

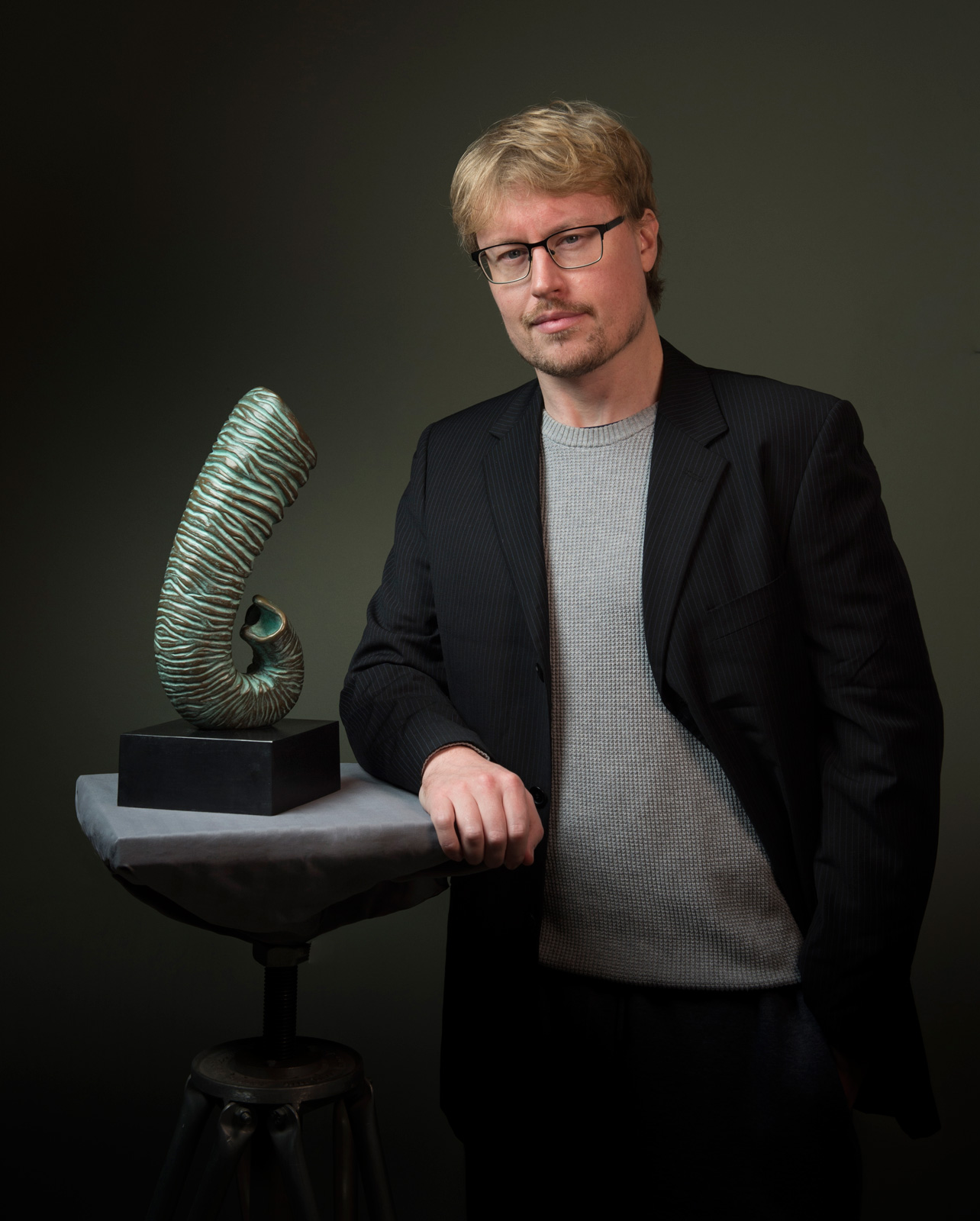
- Sculptor Anthony Smith
- Born: 9 February 1984 (age 42); Glasgow, Scotland
- Education: Christ's College, Cambridge
- Notable work: Alfred Russel Wallace statue, Natural History Museum, London; Young Darwin statue for Christ's College, Cambridge; Guinea £2 Coin for the Royal Mint.
- Website: www.anthonysmithart.co.uk

Anthony Smith FLS (born 9 February 1984) is a British sculptor who works in bronze. He is known for his wildlife sculptures as well as his depictions of well-known figures, including Charles Darwin, Ian Fleming, and Alfred Russel Wallace. He has been awarded major public commissions including the design of a new £2 coin for the Royal Mint, the first new statue for London's Natural History Museum in more than eighty years, and a life-sized statue of Charles Darwin for Christ's College, Cambridge. In addition, he is a wildlife photographer.

== Biography ==
=== Early life and education ===
Smith was born in 1984 in Glasgow, Scotland. He grew up in Qatar and the United Arab Emirates before returning to the UK at the age of eight. He later attended Winchester College, where he discovered his interest in both sculpting and natural history. Whilst still studying at school, aged eighteen, he began sculpting and exhibiting his first bronze sculptures. He went on to study Natural Sciences at Christ's College, Cambridge, graduating in 2005 with a degree in Zoology (MA, hons).

=== Career ===
Upon graduating in 2005, he set up a studio in Cambridge and began sculpting full-time, specialising in wildlife and human figure subjects. His first major commission came in 2007, when he sculpted a portrait bust of Carl Linnaeus for the Linnean Society of London, commemorating the 300th anniversary of Linnaeus's birth. Other commissions soon followed, including a portrait bust of the famous author the James Bond novels, Ian Fleming. His first life-sized statue was commissioned for his old Cambridge College in 2009 to commemorate the bicentenary of its most famous alumnus, Charles Darwin. Smith was inspired to study zoology after first reading On the Origin of Species at the age of sixteen, and he was keen to depict Darwin as a young man, in contrast to the more common depiction of him as an elderly, bearded gentleman, as he was in later life. The life-sized statue was unveiled by Prince Philip, Duke of Edinburgh (then-Chancellor of the University) and was subsequently shortlisted for the Marsh Award for Excellence in Public Sculpture 2009.

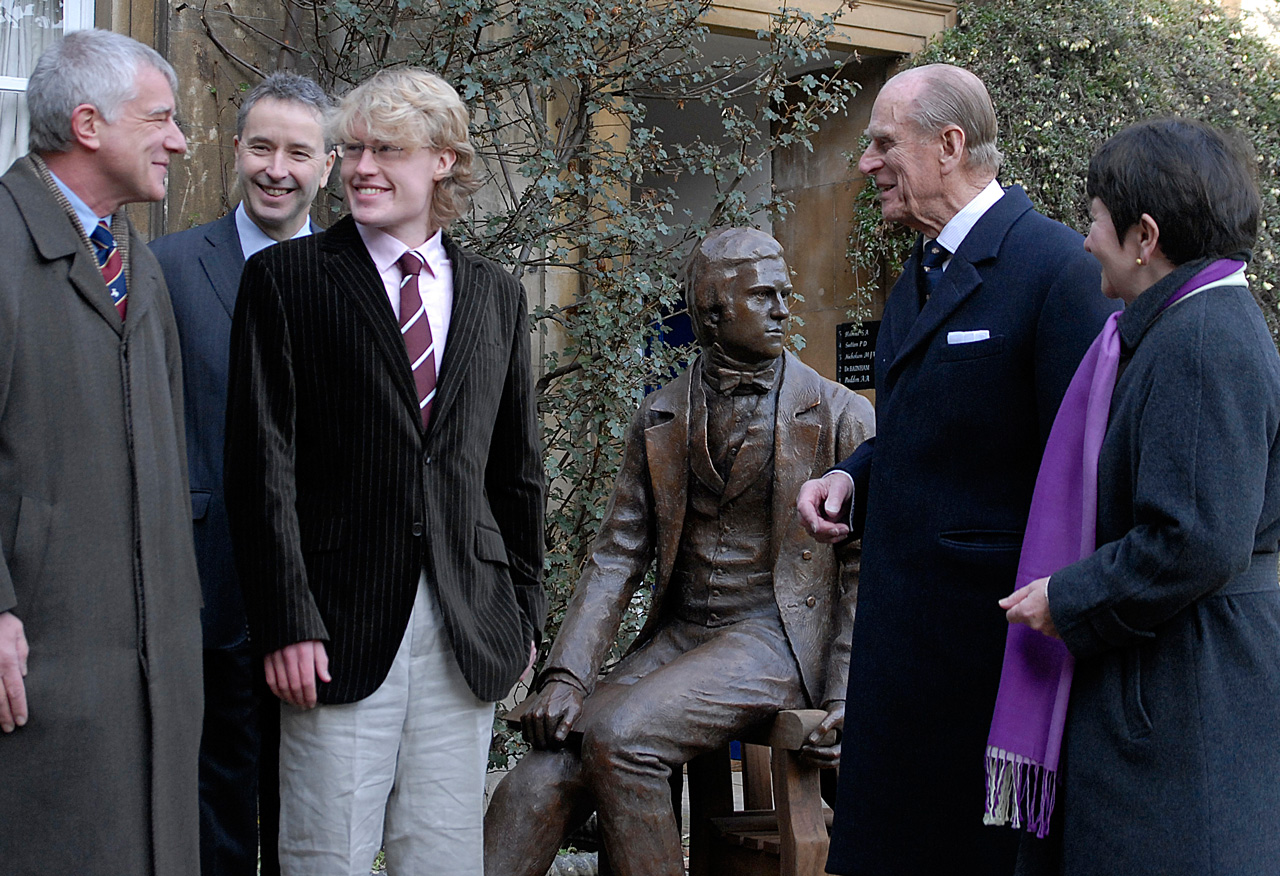
Unveiling of Anthony Smith's Young Darwin statue at Christ's College, Cambridge. Left to right: Alan Smith (benefactor); Frank Kelly, Master; Anthony Smith; Prince Philip, Duke of Edinburgh, Chancellor; Alison Richard, Vice-Chancellor.

Smith's knowledge and interest in the life and works of Charles Darwin then led to him working on the television documentary series Beagle: In Darwin's wake by the Dutch broadcaster VPRO. This involved re-sailing Darwin's famous voyage aboard HMS Beagle, using the Dutch tall ship Stad Amsterdam. The voyage began in August 2009 and lasted eight months, with Smith as one of the show's presenters, discussing Darwin as well as the work of HMS Beagle's artist Conrad Martens.

In 2012 Smith was awarded a Shackleton Scholarship to visit the Falkland Islands as artist in residence, and in 2013 he was invited by the South Georgia Heritage Trust to spend two months on the island of South Georgia as artist in residence. The photos and sketches that he made during this period went on to form the basis for his next series of sculptures.

In 2012 he created the winning design for a new £2 coin for the Royal Mint. The coin was issued to commemorate the 350th anniversary of the first minting of the golden guinea coin. The new coin went into circulation in the United Kingdom in 2013.

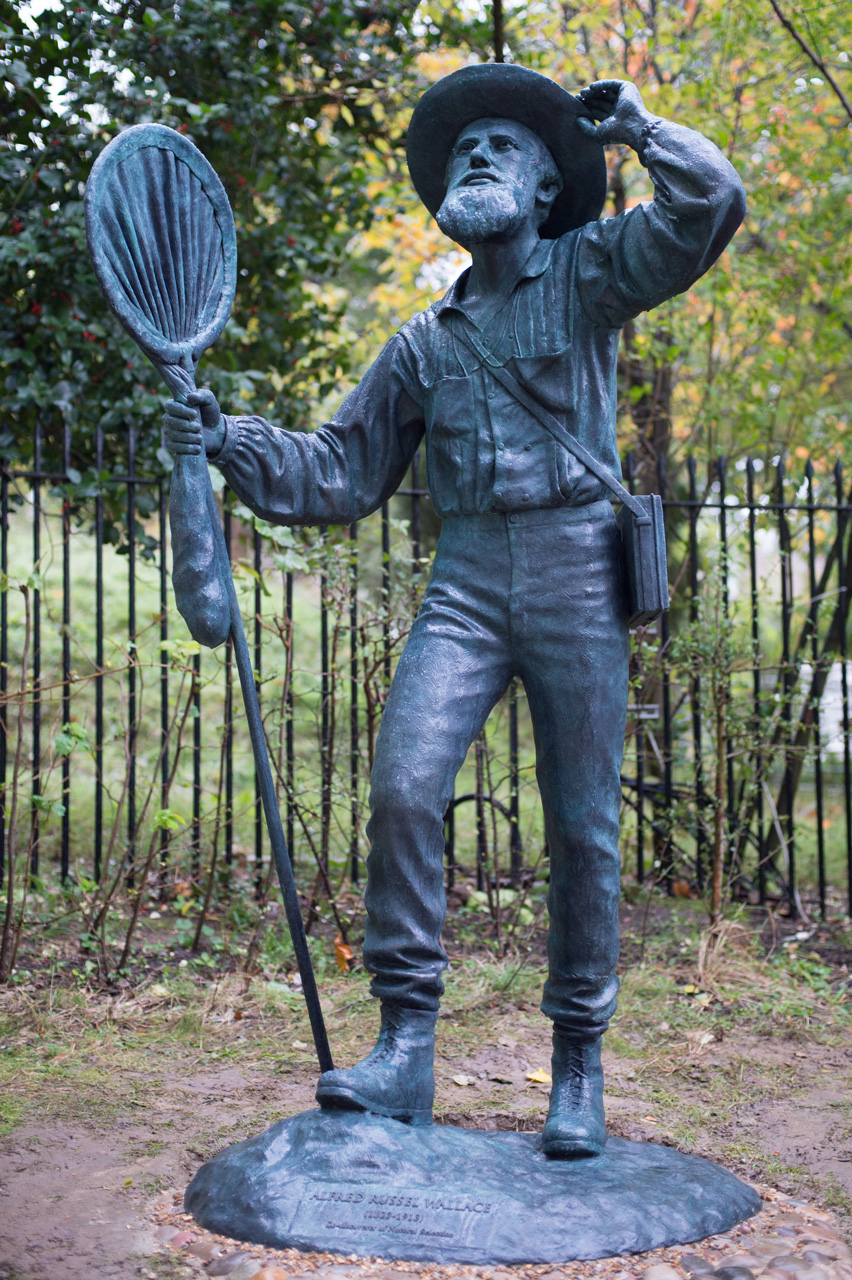
Alfred Russel Wallace statue by Anthony Smith at the Natural History Museum, London

In 2013 he sculpted a seven-foot tall statue of the 19th century naturalist Alfred Russel Wallace for the Natural History Museum, London. This was the first new statue to be commissioned for the museum in more than eighty years. It was unveiled by Sir David Attenborough and subsequently shortlisted for the Marsh Award for Excellence in Public Sculpture 2014.

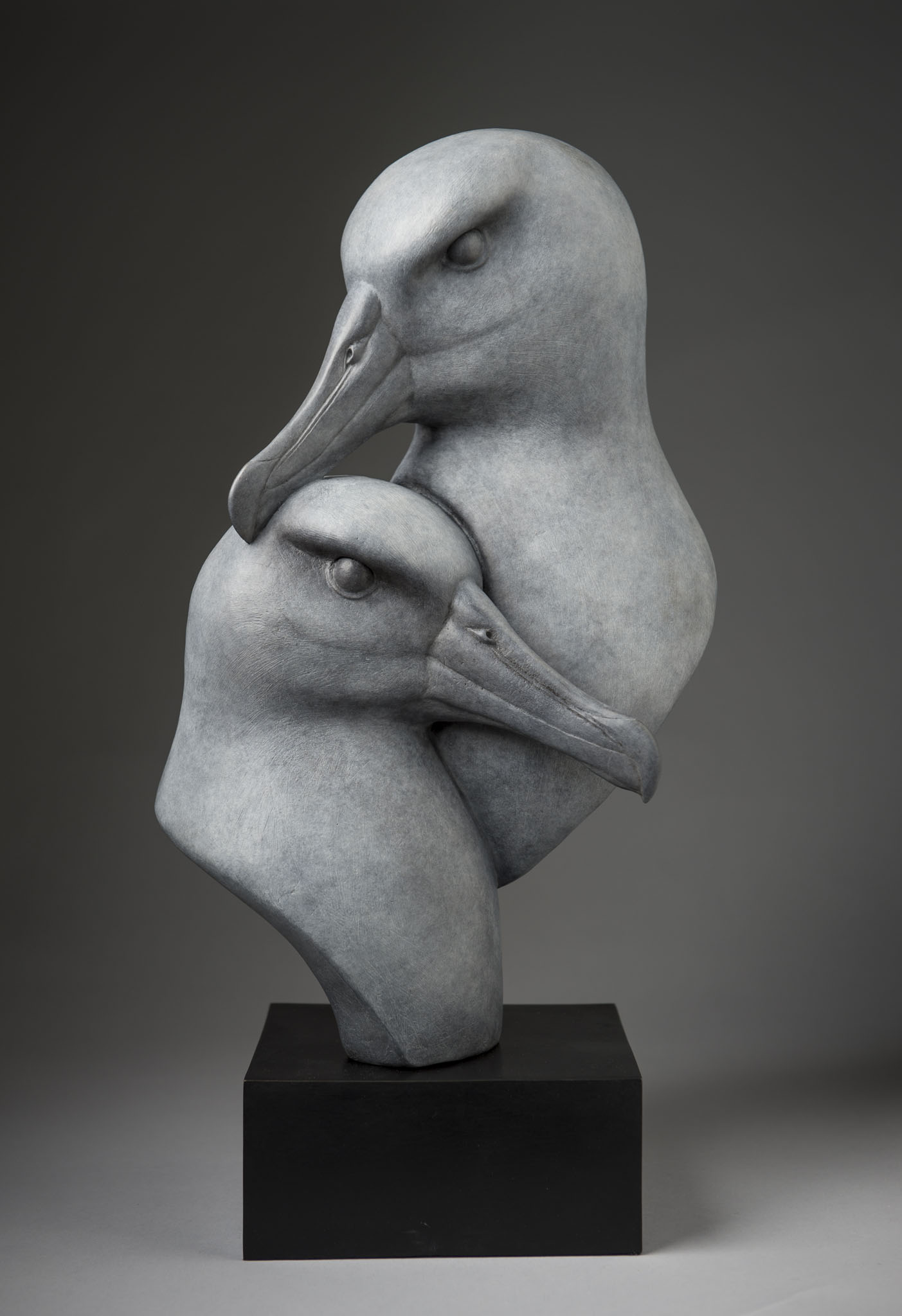
'Albatross Couple' bronze sculpture by Anthony Smith

In addition to his sculpting work, Smith is also a photographer. His first book was published in August 2015, and is a visual account of life aboard the Dutch tall ship Stad Amsterdam.

== Artistic style ==
He states that his skills come from his studies of zoology, as well as the works of other artists such as Rembrandt Bugatti, Auguste Rodin, and François Pompon. He travels widely in order to observe animals in their natural environment, making observations, photographs and sketches which form the basis of his bronze sculptures.

=== Selected commissions ===
- Christ's College, Cambridge
- Yusuf Hamied
- Royal Mint
- The National Botanic Garden of Wales
- Winchester College
- Amsterdam Royal Zoo
- Sedgwick Museum of Earth Sciences, Cambridge
- Natural History Museum, London
