= Congo Journey =

1996 book by Redmond O'Hanlon

- First edition
- Author: Redmond O'Hanlon
- Language: English
- Genre: Autobiographical novel, Travel writing
- Publisher: Hamish Hamilton
- Publication date: 1996 (first edition)
- Publication place: United Kingdom
- Pages: 464 pp (third edition, paperback)
- ISBN: 978-0-14-103727-1

Congo Journey (1996) is an autobiographical novel by British author Redmond O'Hanlon, following his trip across the Congo, taking a friend to Lake Tele in search of Mokèlé-mbèmbé, a legendary Congo dinosaur. The novel was republished in 1997 for United States readers as No Mercy: A Journey to the Heart of the Congo.

== Plot ==
Written in diary form, and set mostly in the People's Republic of the Congo, the book begins as a search for Mokèlé-mbèmbé, a legendary dinosaur of the area. Author Redmond O'Hanlon leads a team during this trek.

In addition, the book also provides an expose of the Bantu and Pygmy peoples, including their lives, spiritual customs and beliefs. The book also discussed problems these people face, such as the Yaws disease.

== Reception ==
Travel writer Michael Shapiro considers the book as one of the "top 30 travel books of all time," and declares the book, chronicling the author's search for the legendary dinosaur, to be in the literary tradition of Joseph Conrad. O’Hanlon's adventure, he says, is by turns dangerous and funny, as he "takes the long way to the lake and nearly gets killed by a village headman", trying to save a baby gorilla, while he "battles his demons and the haunting spirits of Central Africa." According to Shapiro, O’Hanlon emerges from the jungle a changed man. The New York Times called it "half mad and unremittingly brilliant."
