= Redmond O'Hanlon =

English writer and scholar

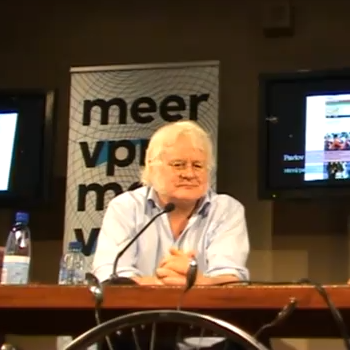
O'Hanlon at the 2010 Science & Technology Summit in The Hague

Redmond O'Hanlon FRGS FRSL (born 5 June 1947) is an English writer and scholar.

== Early life and education ==
O'Hanlon was born in Dorset, England, on June 5, 1947. He was educated at Marlborough College and then Oxford University. After taking his M.Phil. in nineteenth-century English studies in 1971 he was elected senior scholar, and in 1974 Alistair Horne Research Fellow, at St Antony's College, Oxford. He completed his doctoral thesis, Changing scientific concepts of nature in the English novel, 1850–1920, in 1977.

Though very religious when he was young, O'Hanlon became an atheist upon his discovery of the works of Charles Darwin.

== Career ==
From 1970 to 1974, O'Hanlon was a member of the literature panel of the Arts Council of Great Britain.

He was elected a member of the Society for the Bibliography of Natural History in 1982, a Fellow of the Royal Geographical Society in 1984 and a Fellow of the Royal Society of Literature in 1993. For 15 years, he was the natural history editor of The Times Literary Supplement.

O'Hanlon has become known for his journeys into some of the most remote jungles of the world, in Borneo, the Amazon basin and Congo. He has also written a harrowing account of a trip to the North Atlantic on a trawler.

Between September 2009 and May 2010, O'Hanlon was a guest and co-presenter on the programme Beagle: In Darwin's wake for both Canvas in Belgium and VPRO Television in the Netherlands. In the programme, the clipper Stad Amsterdam re-traced the route that Charles Darwin took aboard HMS Beagle (1831–36), a journey that played a seminal role in his thinking on evolution.

O'Hanlon attended the Science & Technology Summit at the World Forum Convention Center in The Hague on 18 November 2010. Fellow Beagle shipmate Sarah Darwin was another featured guest at this convention.

In November 2011, VPRO Television began broadcasting O'Hanlons helden (English: O'Hanlon's heroes). In this eight-part series O'Hanlon introduces the viewer to his heroes of the nineteenth century. The programme was awarded the prestigious Dutch television award, De Zilveren Nipkowschijf (English: The Silver Nipkow disk). This Silver 1st prize is awarded annually by a professional jury to the best quality television programme. A second eight-part series of O'Hanlons helden was broadcast during the winter of 2013–2014.

== Published works ==
- Charles Darwin 1809–1882: A Centennial Commemoration (1982) (contributor)
- Joseph Conrad and Charles Darwin: The Influence of Scientific Thought on Conrad's Fiction (1984)
- Into the Heart of Borneo (1984)
- In Trouble Again: A Journey Between the Orinoco and the Amazon (1988)
- Congo Journey (1996)
  - US edition: No Mercy: A Journey Into the Heart of the Congo (1997)
- Trawler: A Journey Through the North Atlantic (2003)
- [with Rudy Rotthier] God, Darwin en natuur (2009)
  - English translation: The Fetish Room (2011)
