= Beagle: In Darwin's wake =

Dutch-Flemish television series

- Beagle: In het kielzog van Darwin
- Genre: Popular science
- Presented by: Lex Runderkamp
- Starring: Dirk Draulans, Anthony Smith, Sarah Darwin, Redmond O'Hanlon
- Country of origin: Netherlands
- Original languages: Dutch; English
- No. of seasons: 1
- No. of episodes: 35

Original release
- Network: VPRO, Teleac, Canvas
- Release: September 13, 2009 – May 30, 2010

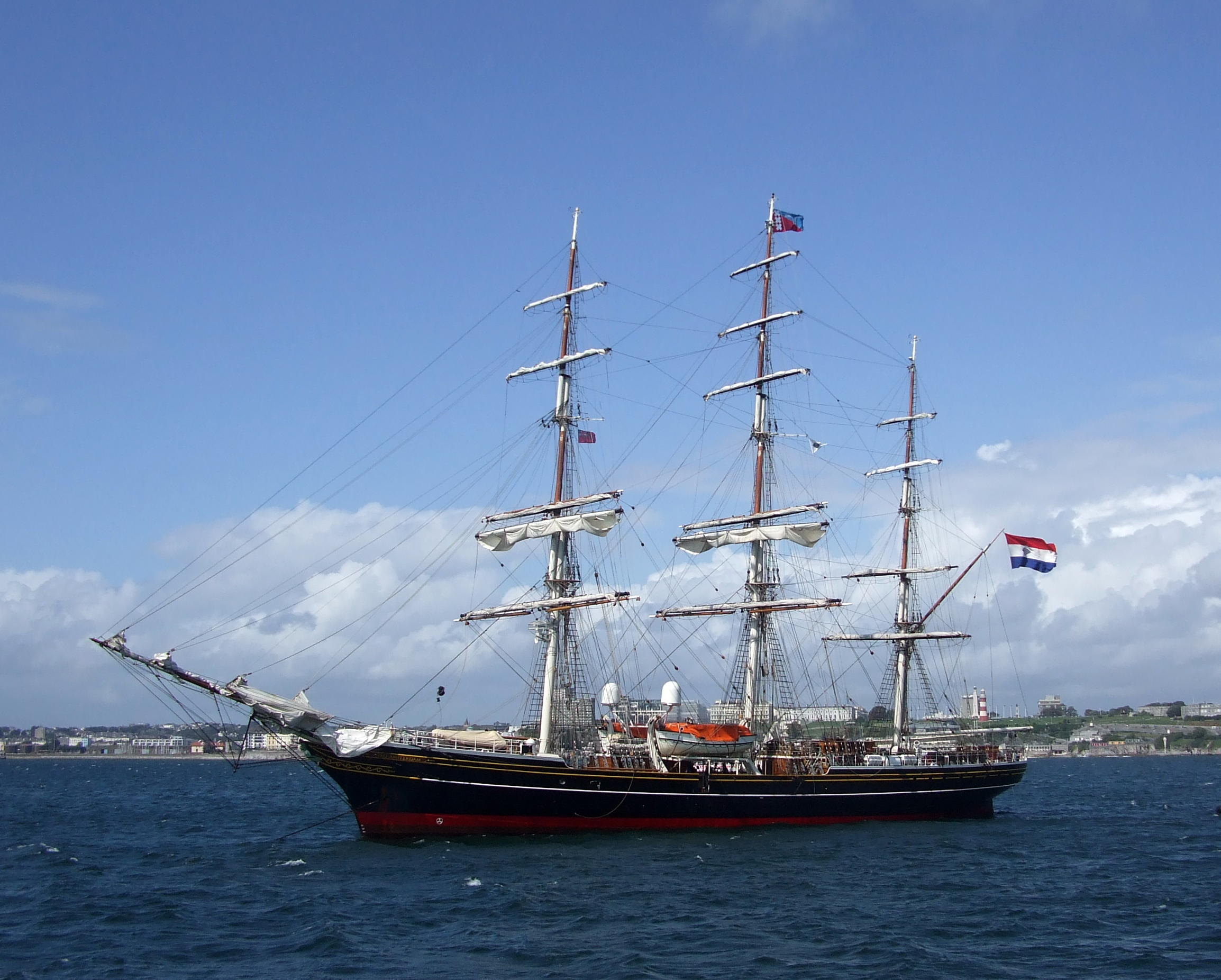
The clipper Stad Amsterdam which re-enacted the voyage of the Beagle

Beagle: In het kielzog van Darwin (English: Beagle: In Darwin's wake) was a Dutch-Flemish television series from 2009 and 2010 initiated by the VPRO in collaboration with Teleac (Dutch educational broadcaster) and Canvas, to commemorate the 150th anniversary of Charles Darwin's ground-breaking book On the Origin of Species. The series is centred on an 8-month voyage around the world on board the clipper Stad Amsterdam, which follows the route of the five-year-long voyage of Charles Darwin on board of the ship HMS Beagle between 1831 and 1836. The Stad Amsterdam departed from the English port of Plymouth on September 1, 2009.

The series consisted of weekly television episodes with a duration of 35 minutes (with the exception of the first and last episodes which had a duration of 70 minutes) and an interactive website which gave more background information about the covered subjects and which allowed viewers to follow the course of the ship 24 hours per day. There was also coverage in the radio programme Noorderlicht.

The recurring shipmates were journalist and presenter Lex Runderkamp, biologists Dirk Draulans and Sarah Darwin (who is the great-great-granddaughter of Charles Darwin), the artist Anthony Smith and the writer Redmond O'Hanlon. Apart from them several other more or less well-known people joined the voyage and some joined for only one or more legs of the voyage, including some other descendants of Charles Darwin.

On November 11, 2009, four people from the series were involved in a car crash in Argentina, in which two people died including British historian and Falklands archivist Jane Cameron.
