= Stad Amsterdam =

Three masted clipper launched in 2000

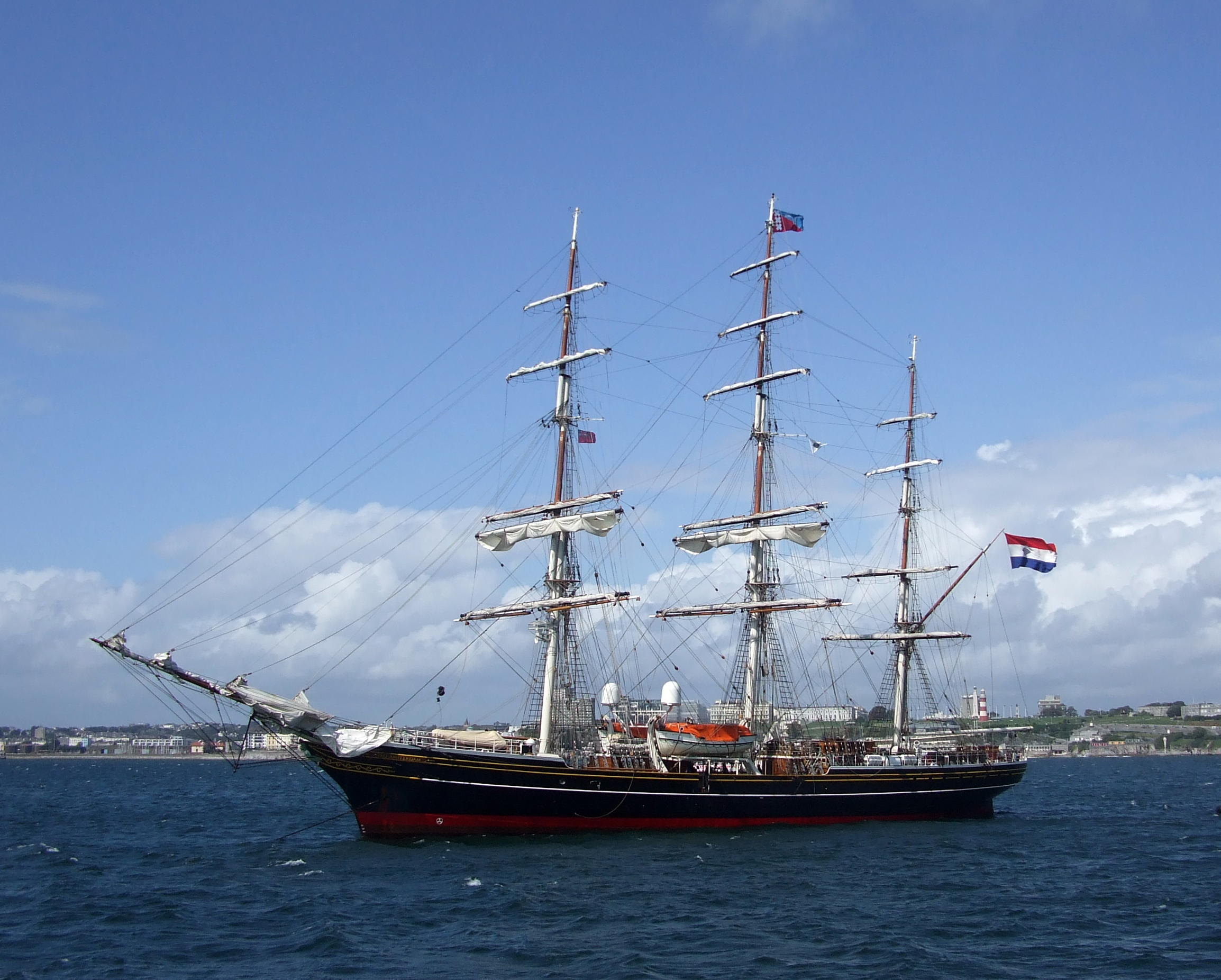
- Stad Amsterdam in 2009

History

Netherlands
- Name: Stad Amsterdam
- Namesake: Amsterdam
- Operator: Randstad NV
- Builder: Damen Shipyard
- Laid down: 1997
- Launched: 2000
- Identification: IMO number: 9185554; MMSI number: 246494000; Callsign: PECA
- Status: Active

General characteristics
- Type: Clipper
- Displacement: 1,038 t (1,022 long tons)
- Length: 76 m (249 ft 4 in)
- Beam: 10 m (32 ft 10 in)
- Draught: 4 m (13 ft 1 in)
- Installed power: Caterpillar 1,014 hp (756 kW) engine
- Sail plan: Full rigged ship
- Speed: 17 knots (31 km/h; 20 mph) max. under sail
- Capacity: 28–115 passengers (long / short sailing trips)
- Crew: 30
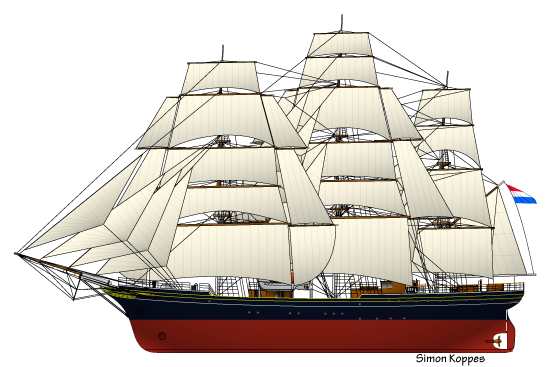
- Line art of Stad Amsterdam

Stad Amsterdam (City of Amsterdam) is a three-masted clipper that was built in Amsterdam, the Netherlands, in 2000 at the Damen Shipyard.

The ship was designed by Gerard Dijkstra who modelled her after the mid-19th century frigate Amsterdam, but she is not a replica. A major difference is that the hull is made of steel. The owners call the ship a "modern extreme clipper in historical perspective", meaning that the construction method is a combination of the best qualities of clippers of the past, outfitted and built with modern techniques but with a classic "look and feel". She is a very fast ship, with 15 knots being a normal speed. She won the 2001 Cutty Sark Tall Ships' Race.

She is rigged with double topsails on the fore and main mast and a single topsail on the mizzen. She has royals on all masts and a skysail on the main mast. The building of the hull in 1997/98 was used as a work experience project for the unemployed (e.g. metalworking and welding). The ship was first presented to the public at the 2000 edition of SAIL Amsterdam. During the 2005, 2010 and 2015 editions of the event she was the flagship.

The Stad Amsterdam is used for training and as a charter-ship for guests. The crew is international and the official language on board is English. Her home port is Amsterdam.

In September 2009 Stad Amsterdam was refitted to accommodate a televised research expedition, tracing the second voyage of HMS Beagle (1831–1836). The ship re-sailed the route of the Beagle in approximately 8 months while collecting information to allow comparison between Charles Darwin's Beagle observations and the current ones. The show was aired by the Dutch public broadcaster VPRO as Beagle: In Darwin's Wake (Beagle: In het kielzog van Darwin).

The Stad Amsterdam celebrated her 15th anniversary at the five-day SAIL Amsterdam 2015 tall ships festival in August 2015. The occasion was commemorated with the publication of a book about the ship, with contributions from Eberhard van der Laan - then the Mayor of Amsterdam - and the co-founder of the ship, Frits Goldschmeding. The book was co-created by former quartermaster Bart Huijs, and the sculptor and photographer, Anthony Smith.

== Specifications ==
- Full-rigged tall ship
- Deck Length: 60.5 m
- Length overall: 76 m
- Beam: 10.5 m
- Air draught (height): 46.3 m
- Draught: 4.8 m
- Sail area: 2200 m^{2} (29 sails)
- Crew: 32
- Water displacement: 1083 m^{3}
- Tonnage: 723 BRT
- Engine: 749 kW (1014 hp)
- Speed under engine: 11 knots
- Speed under sail: 16.5 knots
- Passengers for daytrips: 120 max
- Passengers multi-day trips: 58 max
- Cabins for 2/4 persons: 13
- Cabins for 3/6 persons: 1
- Building cost: approximately €10 million
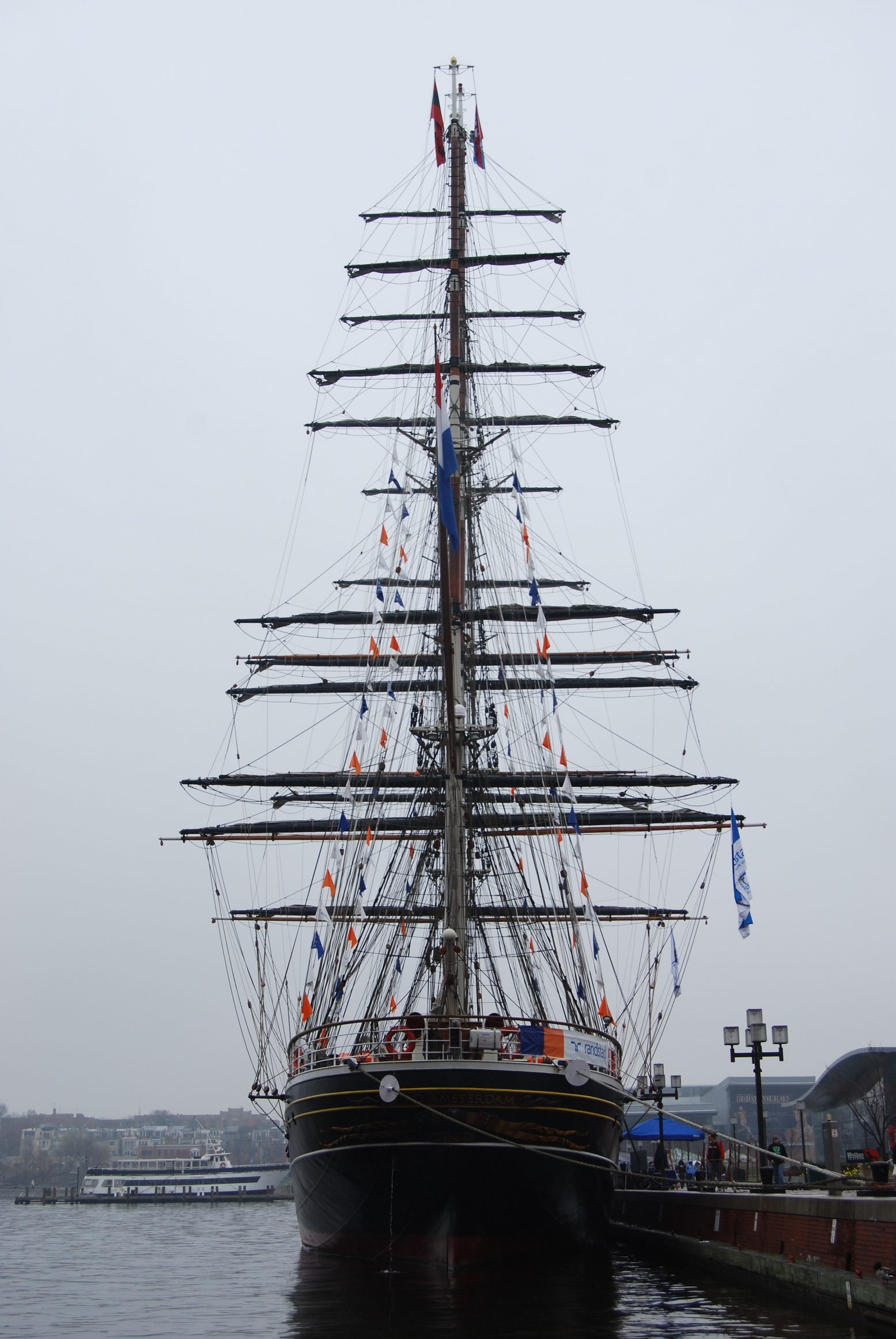
Stad Amsterdam (aft) (Baltimore 2008)

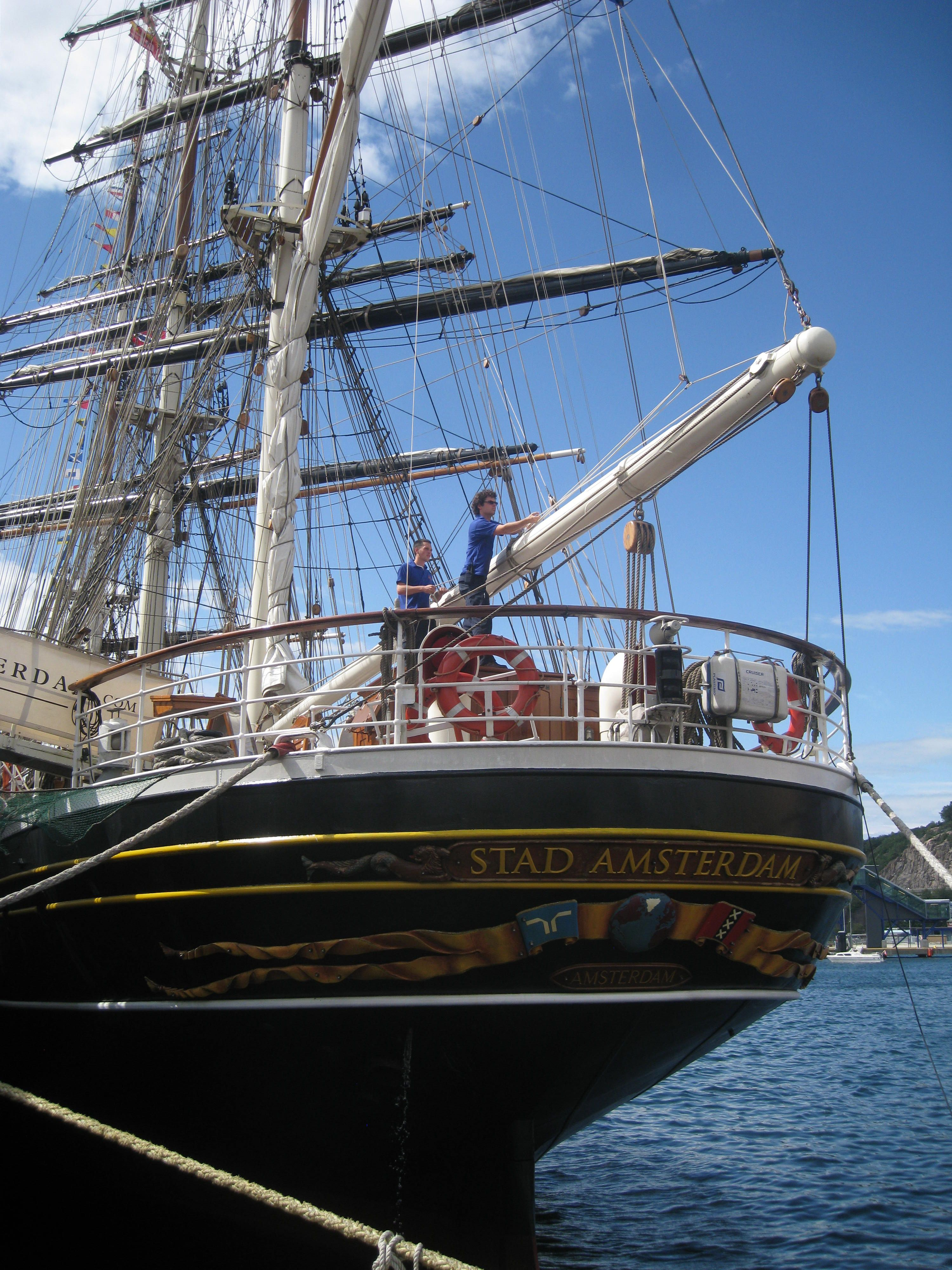
Stad Amsterdam (Kristiansand 2010)

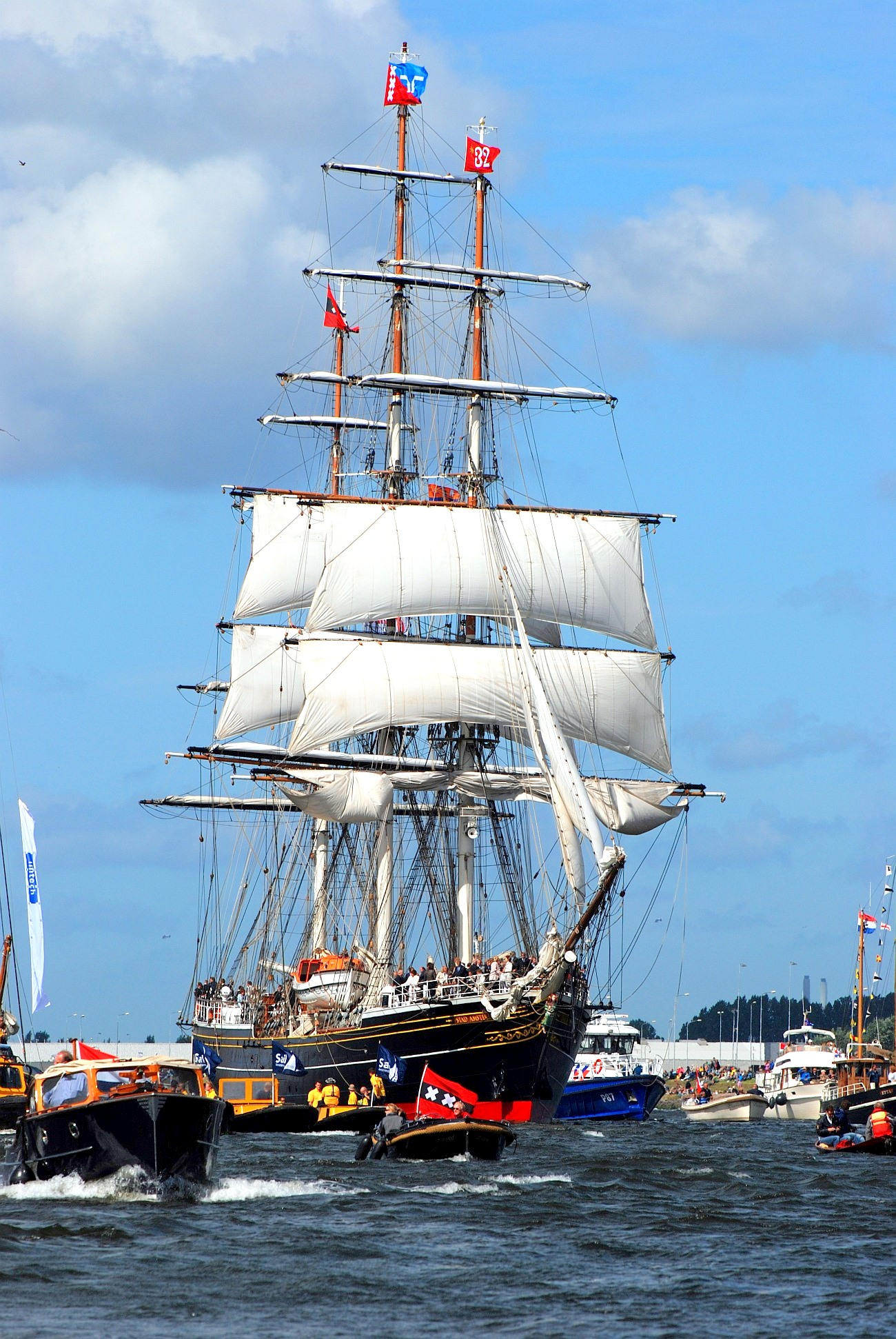
Stad Amsterdam (Amsterdam 2010)

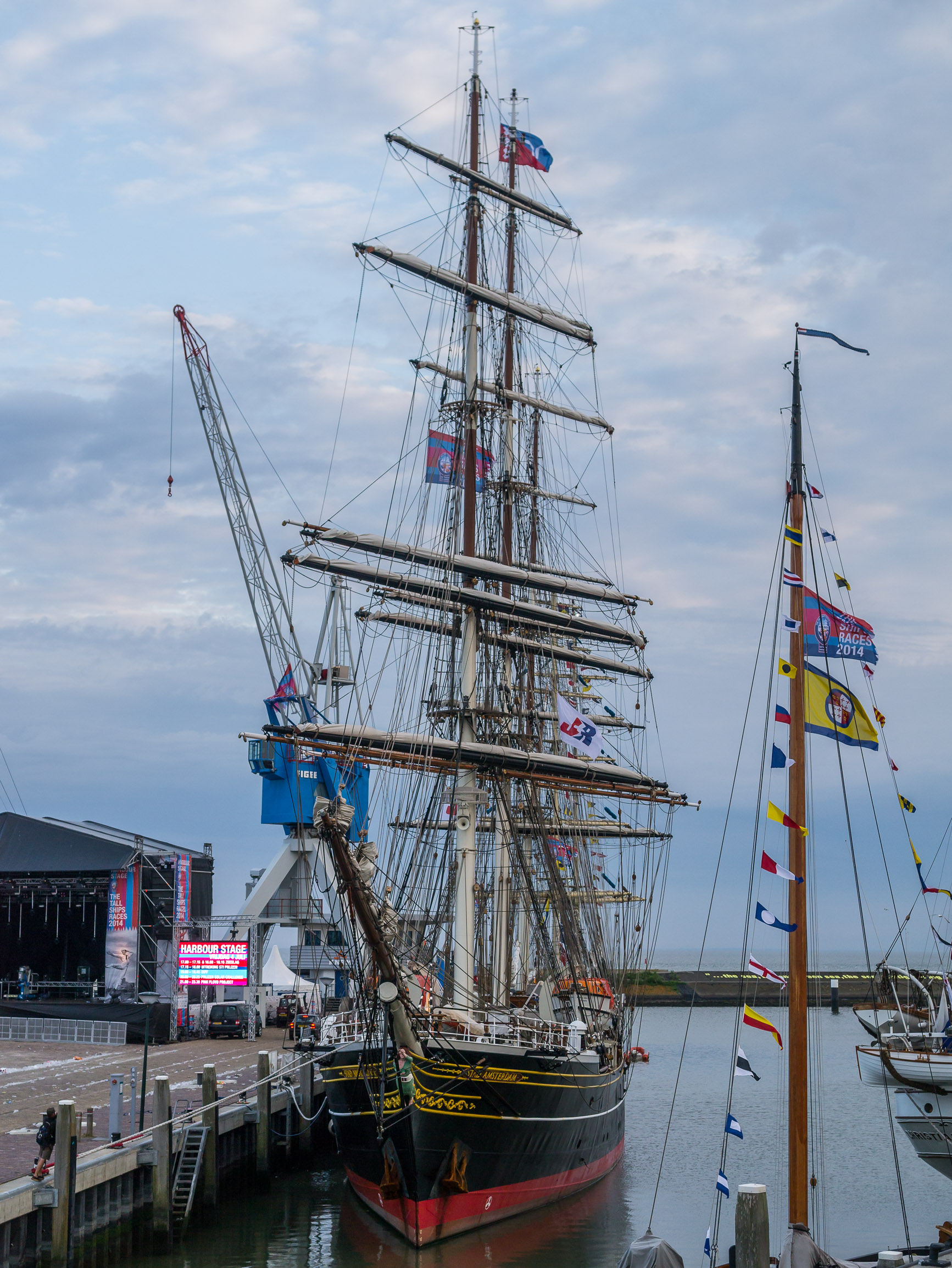
Start tallship races 2014 (Harlingen)

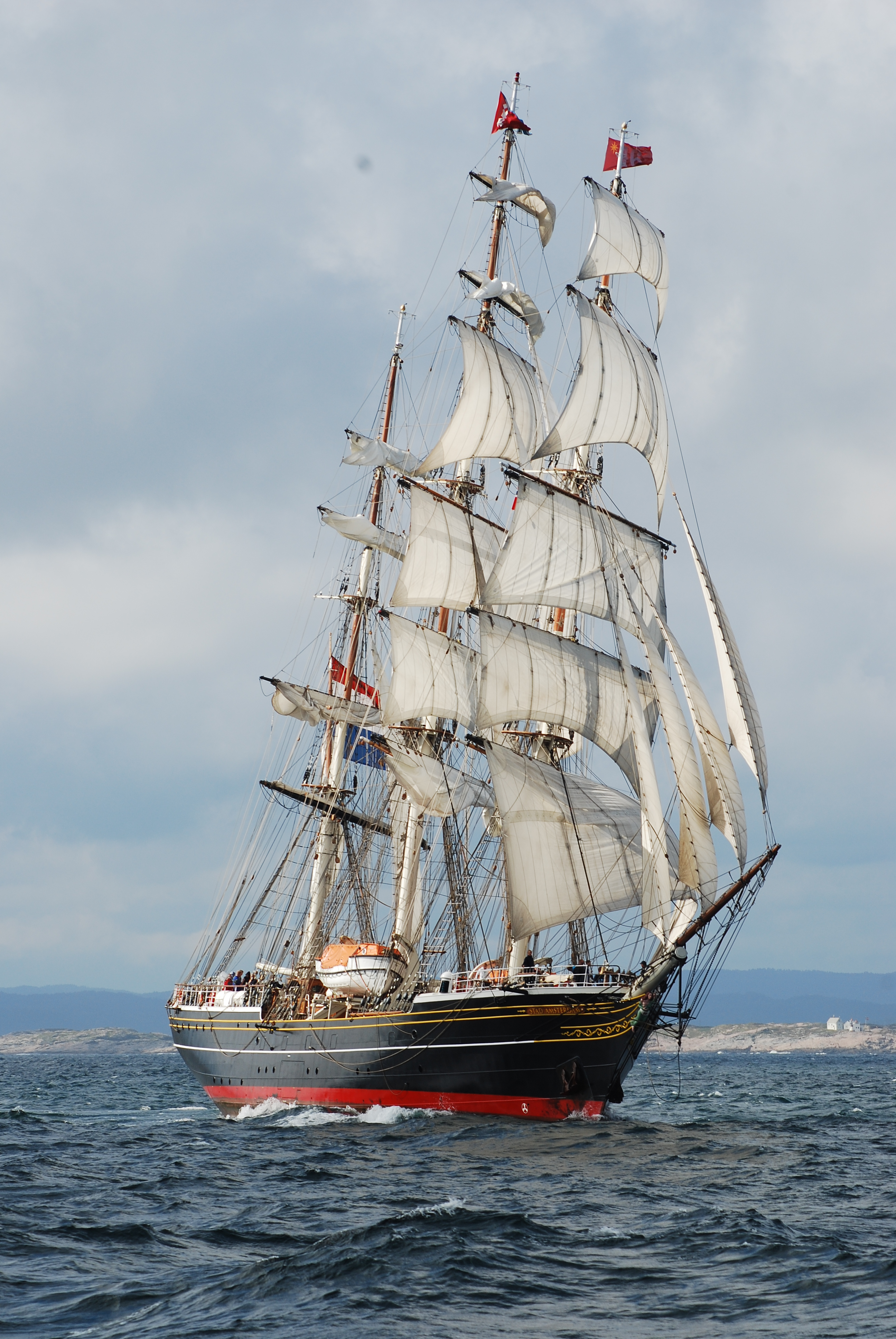

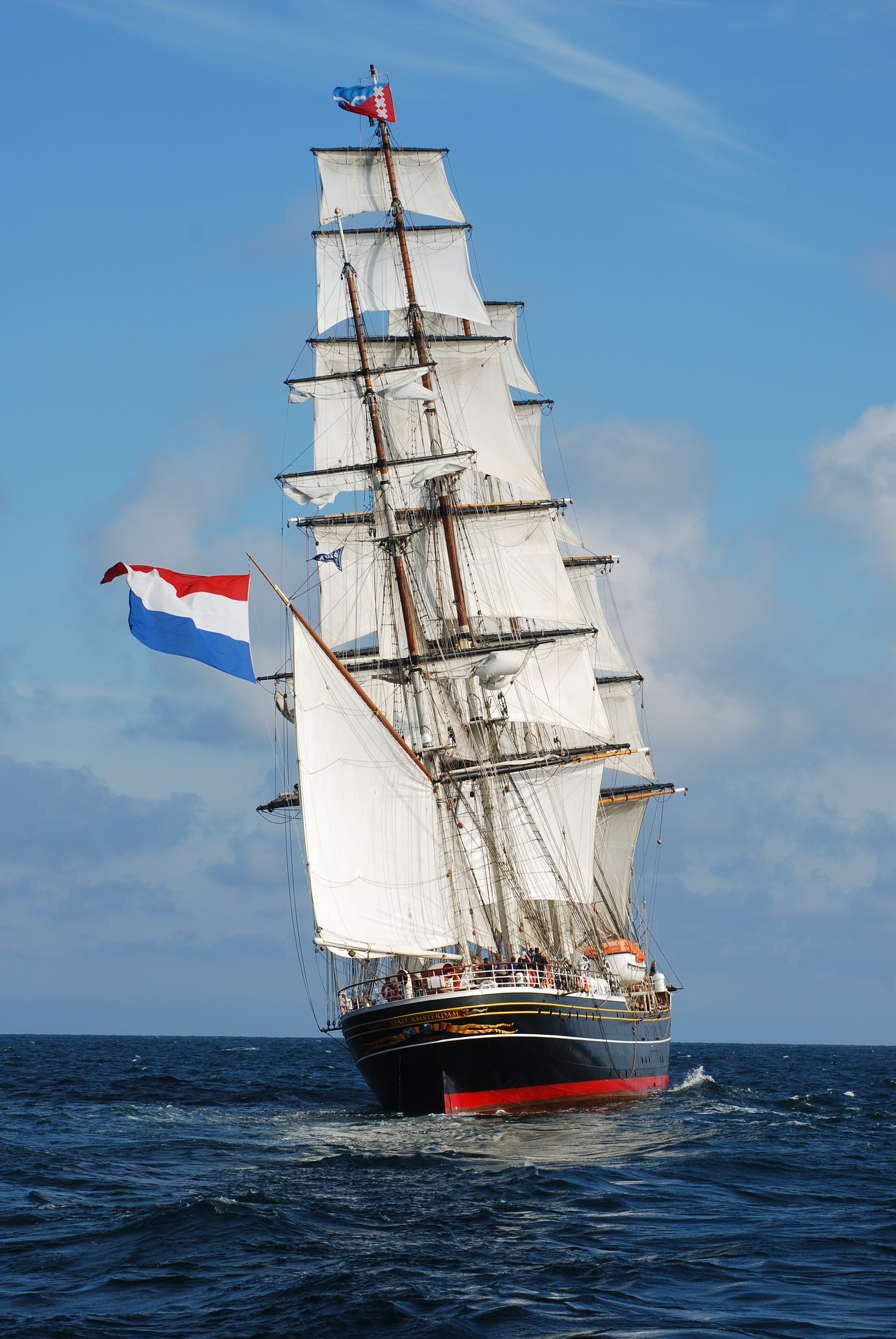

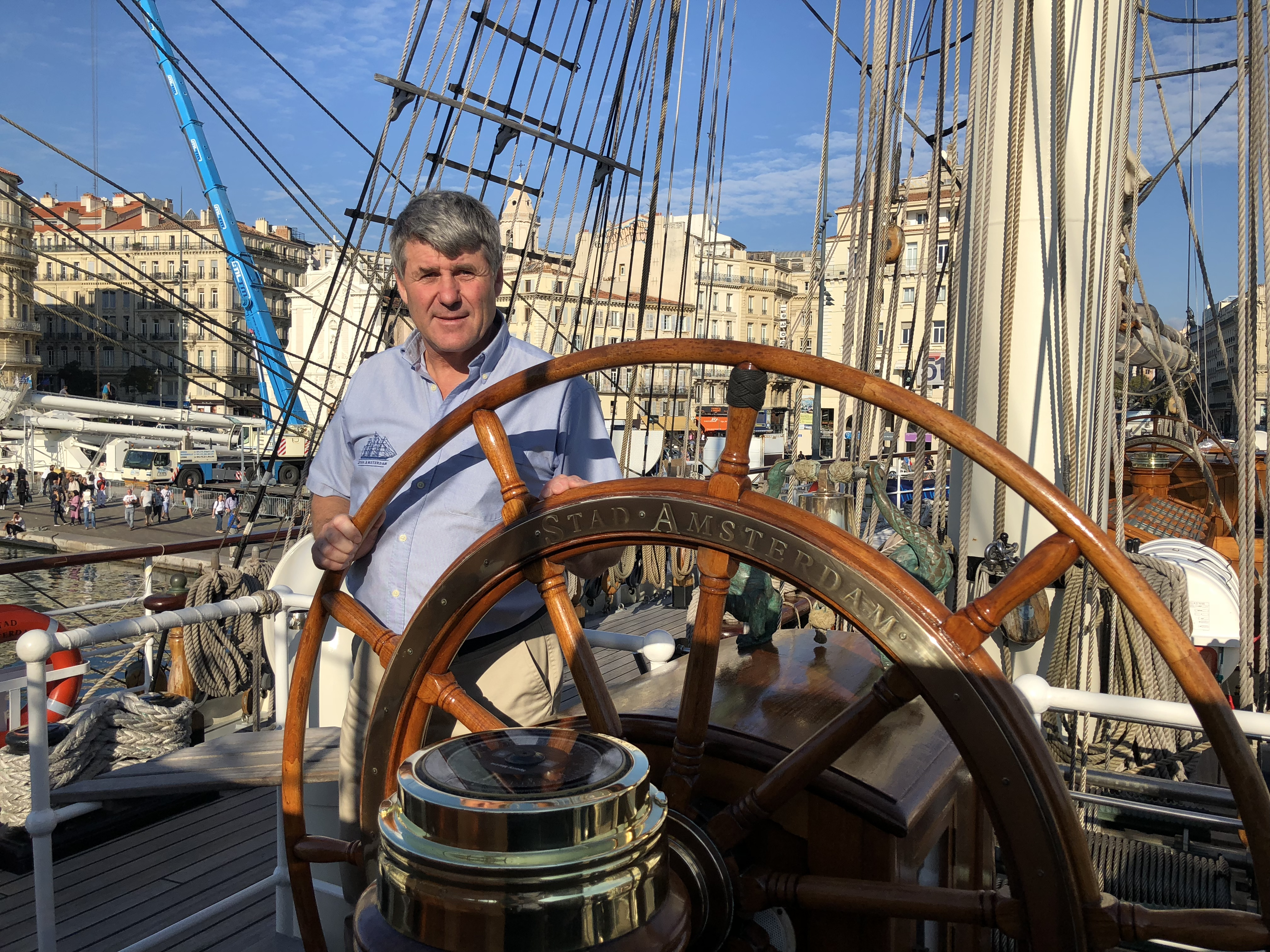
Andi Manser, captain of Stad Amsterdam, Marseille October 2018

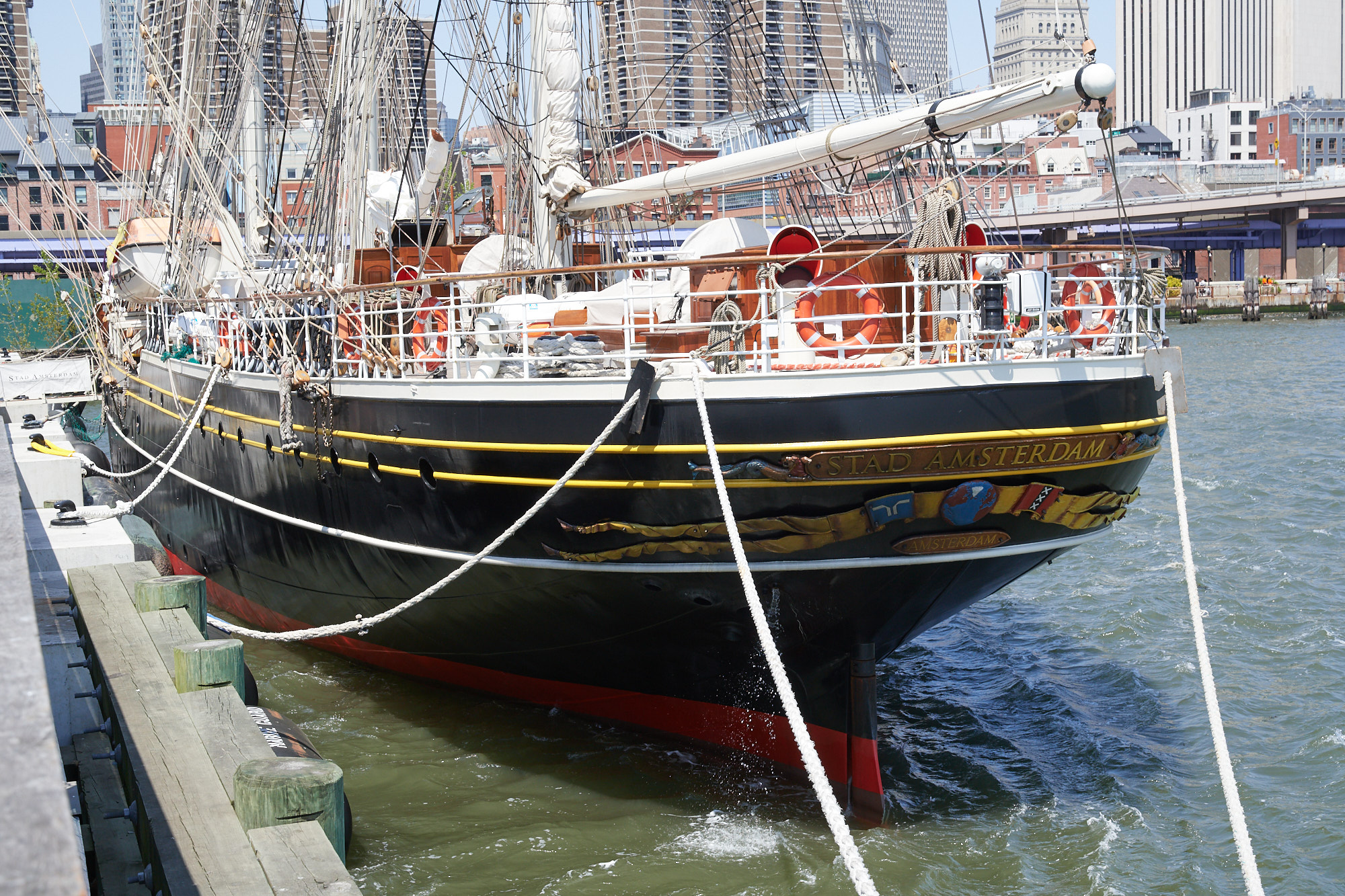
Stad Amsterdam at South Street Seaport, New York City, April 2023

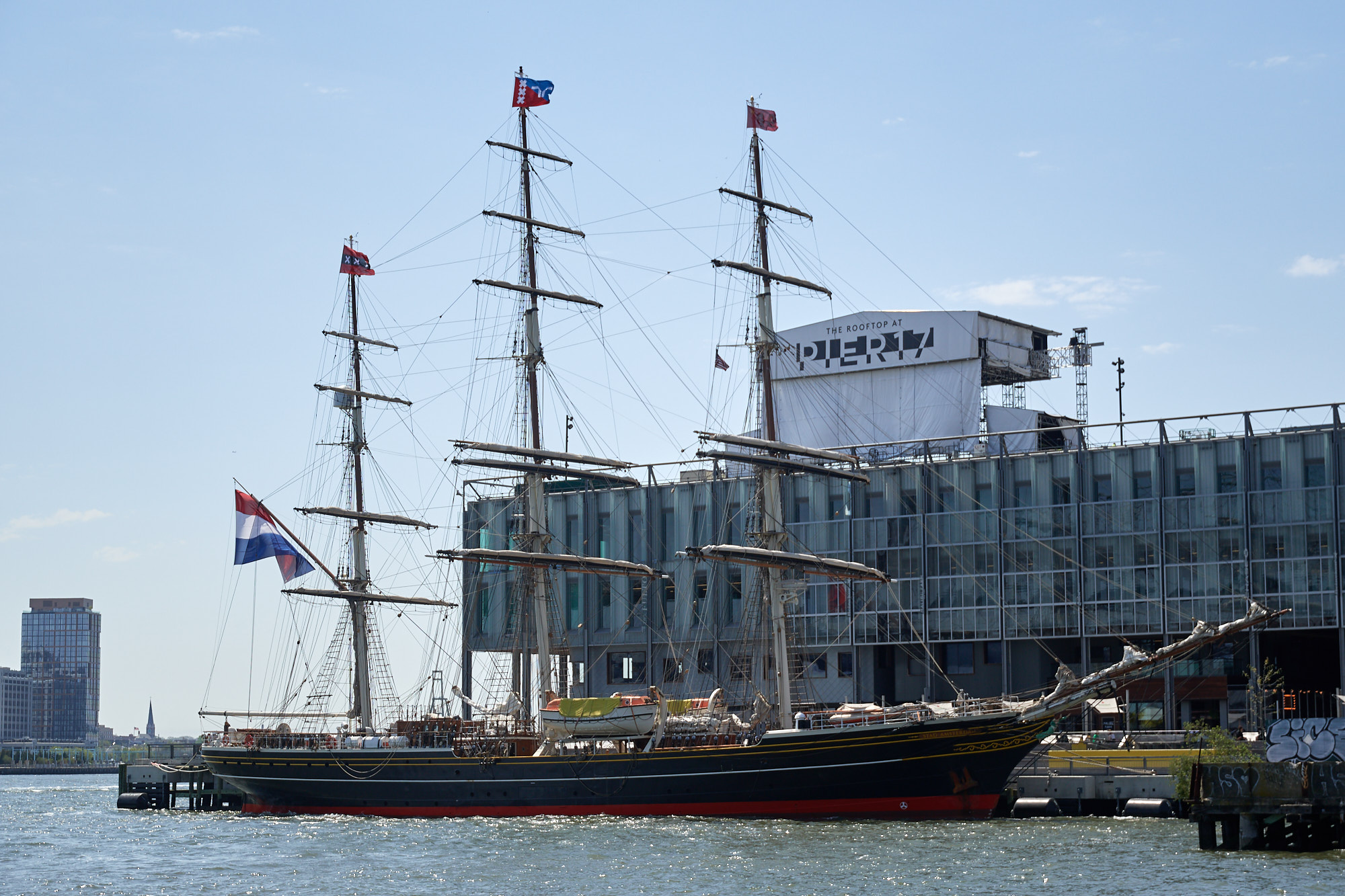
Stad Amsterdam at South Street Seaport, New York City April 2023

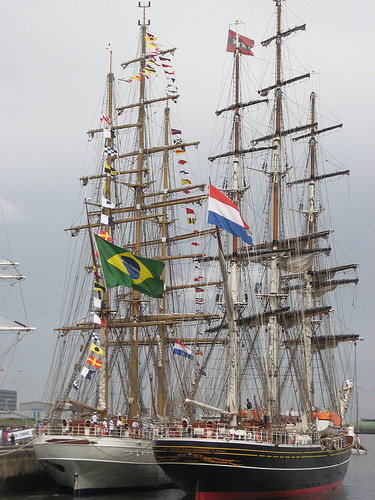
Stad Amsterdam and her sister ship, Cisne Branco

== See also ==
- List of large sailing vessels
- Cisne Branco
