= Laura Dave (journalist) =

Cameroonian journalist

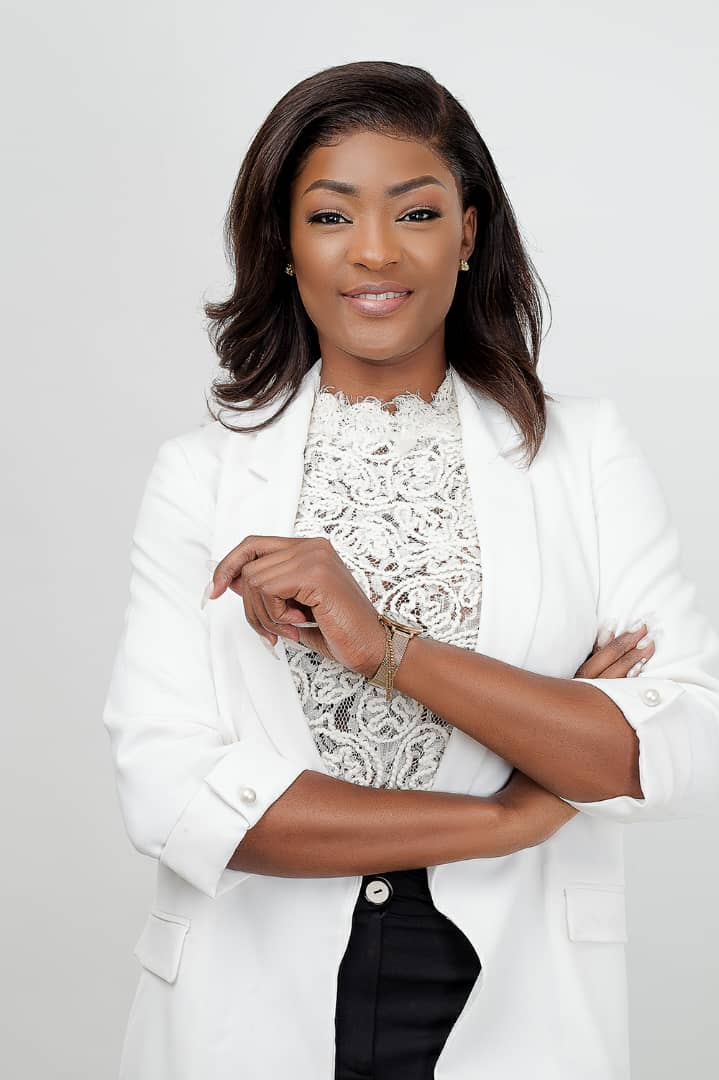
- Laura Dave in 2021
- Born: Biassi Feukeu Davide Laure; 19 May 1985 (age 40); Tonga, West Region, Cameroon
- Occupations: Journalist; television presenter; entrepreneur; producer
- Employer: Laura Dave Media
- Awards: Nominated for Africa Talents Awards

Biassi Feukeu Davide Laure (born 19 May 1985 in Tonga), better known as Laura Dave, is a journalist, presenter, entrepreneur, and producer from Cameroon.

== Early life and education ==
Biassi Feukeu Davide Laure was born on 19 May 1985 in the town of Tonga in the West Region of Cameroon. Her father (d. 2003), originally from the Nde Department in Western Cameroon, worked as a herbalist; her mother, from Yabassi in the Nkam region of the Littoral Region of Cameroon, works as a seamstress. Dave is the first-born and only daughter in a family of three children. She spent most of her childhood in Yaoundé.

Dave began her schooling at L'École maternelle et primaire du Camp Bové, then attended the Collège d'Enseignement Secondaire (CES) in Ngoa Ekélé for primary education, Lycée Général-Leclerc where she obtained her baccalauréat, and the Institut Supérieur de Traduction, d'Interprétation et de communication (ISTIC). In Douala, she obtained her BTS in Business Communication from the Institut Supérieur de Management (ISMA).

== Career ==
Laura Dave began her career in broadcasting by practicing with a microphone at home and in nightclubs at the age of 14, alongside Serge Tamba and Bill Rock, both radio presenters.

At the age of 16, Dave began her professional career at Radio Tiéméni Siantou (RTS).

She then joined Equinoxe TV where she worked as a program presenter for two years before moving on to Radio Nostalgie Cameroon as a radio presenter. She subsequently joined A+ Cameroon, a subsidiary of A+ Group, where she served as Head of Sales and Marketing. After three years at A+ Cameroon, she returned to her passion for radio and joined Radio Balafon as a radio host. In addition to her work at Radio Balafon, Dave also co-founded the production company "LD PROD", where she served as CEO, producing television programs such as "Travelling 3, Season 2" with Laura Dave.

In 2019, she was featured on the list of the top 10 brilliant radio presenters and journalists who have not appeared much on television. Dave is known for her ambition and perseverance in the media industry, which earned her the nickname "Laura Dave, l’ambitieuse forcenée" (Laura Dave, the relentless ambitious one).

== Personal life ==
Laura Dave was previously married to Tchop Tchop, with whom she has a son.
