= Bafia (disambiguation) =

Bafia is a town in the Centre Province of Cameroon.

Bafia or Bavia may also refer to:

== Bafia ==
- Bafia languages, a node of Bantu languages.
- Bafia language, a Bantu language
- Bafia people, the Africans native to Bafia
- Cosmos de Bafia, a football club
- Tadeusz Bafia, a Polish skier
- The Bank and Financial Institution Act (BAFIA) in Nepalese law

== Bavia ==
- Bavia, a genus of jumping spiders
- Bavia, a Roman gente
- Luis de Bávia, a 17th-century Spanish writer
