= Ndemli language =

Grassfields language spoken in Cameroon

Ndemli
- Native to: Cameroon
- Native speakers: (10,000 cited 1999)
- Language family: Niger–Congo?: Atlantic–Congo; Benue–Congo; Southern Bantoid; Grassfields; Narrow; Ndemli

Language codes
- ISO 639-3: nml
- Glottolog: ndem1249

Ndemli, or Bandem, is a language of Cameroon spoken primarily in the Nkam department of the Littoral Region; between Yabassi, Yingui and Nkondjock. Recent classifications such as Nurse (2003) place it in with the Narrow Grassfields languages, though Ethnologue does not reflect this. Ethnologue states that it is "related to Tikar" and that "the Bandobo dialect of Tikar is very similar to Ndemli", though it is not clear if Bandobo actually is Tikar.

== Phonology ==
Ndemli Consonant Phonemes
		Labial	Alveolar	Palatal	Velar	Glottal
Stop	voiceless	p	t	c	k	ʔ
Stop	voiced	b	d	ɟ	g	
Stop	prenasalized voiceless		ⁿt	ᶮc	ᵑk	
Stop	prenasalized voiced	ᵐb	ⁿd	ᶮɟ	ᵑg	
Nasal		m	n	ɲ	ŋ	
Affricate	voiceless		ts	t̠ʃ		
Affricate	voiced			d̠ʒ		
Trill			r			
Fricative		f	s		ɣ	h
Approximant		w	l	j		

Ndemli Vowel Phonemes
	Front		Central	Back
	Unrounded	Rounded	Central	Back
Close	i(ː)		ʉ(ː)	u(ː)
Close-mid	e(ː)	ø(ː)		o(ː)
Open-mid	ɛ(ː)			ɔ(ː)
Open			a(ː)	

There are five tones; high, mid, low, rising, and falling.
