= BKH =

BKH may refer to:

- Blackheath railway station, London, National Rail station code
- Pacific Missile Range Facility, Kekaha, IATA and FAA LID airport code
- Kogo language, Cameroon, ISO 639-3 code
