= Lombi language =

The Lombi or Rombi language may be:

- Rombi language, a Bantu language of Cameroon
- Lombi language (DRC), a Sudanic language of Congo
