= Bankon language =

Bantu language spoken in Cameroon

Bankon
- Abo
- Native to: Cameroon
- Region: Littoral region
- Native speakers: (12,000 cited 2001)
- Language family: Niger–Congo?: Atlantic–Congo; Benue–Congo; Southern Bantoid; Bantu (Zone A); Basaa (A.40); Rombi–Bankon; Bankon

Language codes
- ISO 639-3: abb
- Glottolog: bank1256
- Guthrie code: A.42
- ELP: Bankon

Bankon (Abo, Abaw, Bo, Bon) is a Bantu language spoken in the Moungo department of the Littoral Province of southwestern Cameroon. It has a lexical similarity of 86% with Rombi which is spoken in the nearby Meme department of Southwest Province.

Bankon is the endonym. Abo is an administrative name.

== Varieties ==
With 1,300 speakers, Lombe and Bankon are two dialects of the same language. There is over 83% mutual intelligibility.

The Barombi claim to come from the land of the Abo, and the Abo claim to be descended from the Barombi. According to local ethnic legends, coming from the Congo, Nkon, the son of Lombi, settled in the present Bankon or Abo area, while his father Lombi continued further north to found the present Barombi settlements.

The northern subgroup of the Abo is arrived more recently and is of Duala origin; this explains why the Abo are considered to be brothers of the Duala, or even confused with them, even though their language is closer to the Basaa group. The Abo (like all Barombi) also speak Duala.

Lombe, a dialect of the Barombi people, is spoken in the Southwestern Region in three distinct areas: two are located in the department of Mémé. The first is located north of Mount Cameroon around Lake Barombi-Koto, and the second is located west of Kumba around Lake Barombi Mbo (both of which are in Kumba commune). The third, further west, is located in Ndian department, Ekondo-Titi commune, northeast of Ekondo-Titi city. All three areas are enclosed within the Eastern Oroko-speaking area.

In ethnic/folk genealogy, Lombi is ancestral to Nkon, who is ancestral to Bo, according to the genealogies collected by Dika-Akwa.

Bankon is spoken north of the Wouri estuary in the entire northern part of Dibombari commune (in Mungo department, Littoral Region) between the Mbo language area to the north and west, and the Duala language area to the south and east.

== Phonology ==
The Bankon phonological inventory is as follows,

=== Vowels ===
	Front	Back
Close	i iː	u uː
Close-mid	e eː	o oː
Open-mid	ɛ ɛː	ɔ ɔː
Open	a aː	

=== Consonants ===
		Bilabial	Labialized bilabial	Coronal	Palatal	Velar	Labial-velar
Nasal		m	mʷ	n	ɲ	ŋ	ŋʷ
Plosive	prenasal	ᵐb	ᵐbʷ	ⁿd	ᶮdʒ	ᵑɡ	ᵑɡʷ
Plosive	voiced		bʷ	d	dʒ	ɡ	
Plosive	implosive	ɓ					
Plosive	voiceless	p		t	tʃ	k	kʷ ~ kp
Fricative		f		s		ɣ	
Rhotic				ɾ			
Lateral				l			
Approximant					j		w

=== Tone ===
Bankon contrasts four tones on short syllables: high, low, rising and falling.
