= Basaa language =

Bantu language spoken in Cameroon

Basaa
- Mbene
- ɓasaá, ɓàsàa
- Native to: Cameroon
- Region: Centre and Littoral Provinces
- Ethnicity: Basaa people
- Native speakers: 300,000 (2005 SIL)
- Language family: Niger–Congo?: Atlantic–Congo; Benue–Congo; Southern Bantoid; Bantu (Zone A); Basaa languages (A.40); Basaa

Language codes
- ISO 639-2: bas
- ISO 639-3: bas
- Glottolog: basa1284
- Guthrie code: A.43a

Basaa (also rendered Bassa, Basa, Bissa), or Mbene, is a Bantu language spoken in Cameroon by the Basaa people. It is spoken by about 300,000 people in the Centre and Littoral regions.

Maho (2009) lists North and South Kogo as dialects.

== Background and origin ==
Basaa is spoken by 230,000 speakers. They live in Nyong-et-Kelle (Central Region) and Sanaga Maritime (with the exception of the Edéa commune, which has a Bakoko majority) and most of Nkam commune (Littoral Region). In the western and northern parts of this department, the peripheral Basaa dialects are spoken: Yabasi in the commune of Yabassi, Diɓuum in the commune of Nkondjok (Diboum Canton), north of Ndemli and Dimbamban.

Similarly, Basaa Baduala is spoken in Wouri Department (Littoral Region), traditional Basaa territory that is being transformed by the growth of Douala. Basaa is also found in Océan Department (commune of Bipindi, Southern Region).

Hijuk is spoken only in the quarter of Niki in Batanga commune, in Yangben Canton (Ch. Paulian (1980)) by 400 people. Hijuk is a Basaa dialect, despite its geographical location in the southeast of Bokito arrondissement (Mbam-et-Inoubou department, Central Region).

== Phonology ==
=== Vowels ===
	Front	Back
Close	i iː	u uː
Close-mid	e eː	o oː
Open-mid	ɛ ɛː	ɔ ɔː
Open	a aː	

=== Consonants ===
		Bilabial	Coronal	Palatal	Velar	Labial-velar	Uvular	Glottal
Plosive	voiceless	p	t	tʃ dʒ	k	kʷ ɡʷ		
Plosive	prenasal	ᵐb	ⁿd	ᶮdʒ	ᵑɡ			
Plosive	implosive	ɓ						
Fricative		ɸ β	s		x ɣ		χ	h ɦ
Nasal		m	n	ɲ	ŋ	ŋʷ		
Tap			ɾ̥ ɾ					
Lateral			l					
Approximant				j		w		

- When not root-initial and not after a pause, the voiceless stops /p t k/ are realized as voiced stops or voiced fricatives.

=== Tone ===
Basaa contrasts four tones: high, low, high-to-low (falling) and low-to-high (rising).

== Orthography ==
The language uses a Latin-based alphabet, with the addition of the letters Ɓɓ, Ɛɛ, Ŋŋ, Ɔɔ, ten multigraphs, as well as acute, grave, and circumflex accents:

Capital	Small
A	a
B	b
Ɓ	ɓ
C	c
D	d
E	e
Ɛ	ɛ
F	f
G	g
GW	gw
H	h
HY	hy
I	i
J	j
K	k
KW	kw
L	l
M	m
MB	mb
N	n
NJ	nj
NY	ny
ND	nd
Ŋ	ŋ
ŊG	ŋg
ŊGW	ŋgw
ŊW	ŋw
O	o
Ɔ	ɔ
P	p
R	r
S	s
T	t
U	u
V	v
W	w
Y	y

Macron and caron diacritics may be used for marking tone in reference works, for example the dictionary by Pierre Emmanuel Njock.
