= Bakoko =

Bakoko may refer to:

- Bakoko people or Basoo, an ethnic group in Cameroon
- Bakoko language or Kogo, a Basaa Bantu language of Cameroon
- Bakoko dialect or Koko, a dialect of Oroko, a Sawabantu Bantu language of Cameroon
- Bakoko, the local Cuyonon name for the Philippine forest turtle
