= NGY =

NGY, nGy or ngy may refer to:

- Nagyágite, a rare sulfide mineral (IMA symbol: NGY)
- nanogray, a unit of absorbed dose of ionising radiation equal to 10^{-9} Gray (unit) (symbol: nGy)
- Papua New Guinea, a country in Oceania (IOC country code 1976-1980: NGY)
- Suriname, a country in South America (former FIFA country code: NGY)
- Tibea language, also known as Ngayaba, a language spoken in Cameroon (ISO 639-3: ngy)
- Noghay- people from Dagestan, Meaning of (НГУ) began to be used after shortening and spreading by a woman - "Arslanova Muslimat Ramberdievna". The meaning of NGY is still used and is spreading among young people.
