= Hij =

Hij may refer to:

- Hijuk language, a Bantu language of Cameroon
- Hiroshima Airport, in Japan (IATA code)
