= Laura Dave =

Laura Dave may refer to:

- Laura Dave (novelist) (born 1977), American novelist
- Laura Dave (journalist) (born 1985), Cameroonian journalist
