= Naval operations of the Kamerun campaign =

Coordinates: 2°50′N 8°0′E

- Part of the Kamerun campaign in World War I
- Map of the Wouri estuary
Date	24 August – 28 September 1914
Location	Coast of German Kamerun, Wouri estuary
Result	Allied victory

Belligerents
British Empire: British Nigeria; France: French Equatorial Africa	German Empire: German Kamerun

Commanders and leaders
(United Kingdom of Great Britain and Ireland) Major General Charles Dobell	Governor Karl Ebermaier Major Carl Zimmermann

Casualties and losses
Light	2 gunboats sunk 1 merchant vessel sunk 1 gunboat captured 8 merchant vessels captured 36 dead

The Naval operations of the Kamerun campaign were carried out by German and Allied forces during the Kamerun campaign of the First World War from August to September 1914. Naval activity occurred all along the coast of German Kamerun in the Bight of Bonny but most of the action took place in the Wouri estuary. The main event of the campaign were the successful British and French amphibious landings at Duala. The operations carried out by British and French naval forces concluded in securing control over the German colony's entire coastline and the destruction of any German naval vessels that were capable of offering resistance. Allied occupation of the coastline forced the Germans to retreat into the interior of Kamerun where they would meet their defeat in 1916.

== Early Allied movements ==
On 24 August 1914, the French gunboat Surprise bombarded the coast of Kamerun. Later, the French armored cruiser Bruix, based in Libreville shelled and severely damaged the coastal towns of Kampo and Kribi further to the south.

The original British plan had been to land a force at Victoria and move to Duala from there. British vessels were sent to the Bight of Bonny in preparation for these landings, including the armoured cruiser Cumberland. On the way to Kamerun's coast, the Cumberland made port in Lagos, Nigeria to allow the exiled King of Duala aboard along with other officials of the tribe who wished to take part in the landings. The king's uncle was hung for treason by the Germans on 8 August. On 4 September, naval vessels had anchored themselves in Ambas Bay, just off Victoria. However, heavy rains rendered waterways the Allies had planned to use impassable. The landing force then congregated at the Wouri estuary where the Germans had been given time to prepare their marine defenses.

== German defense of the Wouri Estuary ==
In preparation for the coming Allied landings, the Germans mined the Wouri estuary. They sunk 10 or 12 steamships and mine planters in the rivermouth of the Wouri, to prevent landings at Douala. On 11 September the 710-ton gunboat HMS Dwarf attempted to enter the rivermouth but was damaged by German artillery fire and retreated. On 15 September an attempt was made to blow up the Dwarf with a launch full of explosives, but failed. On 16 September, the German customs cutter Nachtigal rammed the Dwarf; an ensuing explosion sank the Nachtigal, killing 36 of her crew. Another attempt to sink the Dwarf took place when two German launches used spar torpedoes to sink the ship but failed. Other encounters between British and German light craft occurred throughout mid-September.

== Allied landings ==
After clearing a three-mile-wide belt of mines and other obstructions, the cruisers HMS Challenger and HMS Cumberland, the Dwarf, and five troopships moved up the Wouri to Douala. The Allied commander of the landing force, Major General Charles Dobell, sent an ultimatum to the German garrison at Douala demanding surrender. Receiving no answer, the British bombarded the town on 26 September. The German garrison stationed in the town promptly withdrew. On 27 September, around 1,000 British and French soldiers landed at Douala, occupying the port without resistance. They found the wireless station there had been destroyed by the retreating Germans, and captured a number of merchant vessels, as well as a German gunboat, the Soden.

At around the same time, Allied forces landed at Bonaberi, a town across the Wouri River from Douala that the Germans had not yet given up. After some fighting the town was surrendered and the German force retreated into the interior of the colony.

Shortly after the Allied landings at Douala, the French vessel Surprise shelled the southern coastal town of Ukoko; two German armed vessels, the Khios and Itolo, were sunk. French infantry landed at Ukoko and took the town shortly after fighting the German garrison there. This battle meant that Germany had effectively no control over the portion of Kamerun to the south of the Spanish colony of Rio Muni

== Aftermath ==
The naval operations of the Kamerun campaign resulted in Allied naval domination of the Wouri estuary and Bight of Bonny, as well as the capture of the main port of Douala and much of the colony's coast. It forced the Germans to withdraw from the populated coast to the mountainous jungle interior of Kamerun. Small German forces attempted to hold onto rivers vital for transportation near Douala, but were pushed further into the interior by British forces in the Battle of Jabassi in early October. On October 3, a French Senegalese force pushed German defenders out of their positions on the Japona river. On 26 October, British and French troops traveling by river threatened Edea, a village some German detachments had fallen back to after the capture of Douala. However, they withdrew and surrendered the town without a fight.
