= Bafia languages =

Family of Bantu languages

Bafia
- Linguistic classification: Niger–Congo?: Atlantic–Congo; Benue–Congo; Southern Bantoid; Bantu (Zone A.50); Bafia
- Subdivisions: Fa’; Kaalong; Bafia (Kpa); Tibea (Ngayaba)

Language codes
- Glottolog: bafi1244

The Bafia languages are a clade of Bantu languages coded Zone A.50 in Guthrie's classification. According to Nurse & Philippson (2003), the languages form a valid node. They are:

Fa’ (Ləfaʼ), Kaaloŋ (Dimbong), Kpaʼ (Bafia), Ngayaba (Tɨɓɛa)

Hijuk was listed as unclassified A.50 in Guthrie, but according to Ethnologue it is quite similar to Basaa.
