= Kaalong language =

Endangered Bantu language of Cameroon

Kaaloŋ
- Dimbong
- Native to: Cameroon
- Ethnicity: 50,000 (no date)
- Native speakers: (140 cited 1992)
- Language family: Niger–Congo?: Atlantic–Congo; Benue–Congo; Bantoid; Bantu (Zone A); Bafia (A.50); Kaaloŋ

Language codes
- ISO 639-3: dii
- Glottolog: dimb1238
- Guthrie code: A.52
- ELP: Dimbong

Kaaloŋ (Kàlòng) also known as Dimbong (Mboŋ), is a nearly extinct Bantu language from the Center Province of Southern Cameroon.

Many Kaalong speakers have shifted to the similar yet arguably distinct Bafia language.

Pey (Rɨpeʔ) may be a dialect, in which case the language might not be close to extinction.
