= Kogo language =

Language

Kogo
- Bakoko
- Native to: Cameroon
- Ethnicity: Bakoko
- Native speakers: (50,000 cited 1982)
- Language family: Niger–Congo?: Atlantic–Congo; Benue–Congo; Bantoid; Bantu (Zone A); Basaa (A.40); Kogo

Language codes
- ISO 639-3: bkh
- Glottolog: bako1249
- Guthrie code: A.43b

Kogo, also referred to as Bakoko and Basoo, is a Bantu language of Cameroon. North and South Kogo are as distinct from each other as they are from Basaa; they might be considered three dialects of a single language.

== Demographics ==
Traditionally, Bakoko and Basaa societies had a very close relationship, especially on a religious level. The Bakoko language was the language of ritual for both the Bakoko and Basaa, and the Basaa language was also familiar to the Bakoko. After the Second World War, as the ritual relations gradually receded, this social and linguistic symbiosis declined. Today, the two languages are sociolinguistically distinct. Bakoko speakers also tend to speak Basaa today, but Basaa speakers typically do not speak Bakoko.

There are many dialects because of the geographical fragmentation of the Bakoko-speaking area. ALCAM (2012) lists the following dialects.

Central dialects:

- Adiá is spoken in Edéa, the capital of the department of Sanaga-Maritime (Littoral Region).
- Yakalag is spoken to the west of the Adiá area in Yakalak canton, Mouanko commune, Sanaga-Maritime department.

In the south:

- Yasug (in Yassoukou canton, with Déhané and Yawanda), which extends into the department of Océan (northeast of the commune of Kribi, Southern Region).

Detached from the southern contiguous group mentioned above are four separate Bakoko groups, each with its own dialect:

In the west:

- Yapoma, spoken in Bakoko canton of the Wouri department (Littoral Region), south of Douala (Japoma villages)
- Yabyan-Yapeke, spoken by the two groups inhabiting the Bakoko canton of the Moungo department (Littoral Region), south of Dibombari (Yabea, Yapaki villages, etc.)

In the northwest:

- Dimbamban is spoken in Mbang canton (in Nkondjok commune) in Nkam department (Littoral Region), between Ndemli in the southeast and Diboum, an isolated Basaa dialect in the north.

In the northeast:

- Bisóo is spoken in Basso canton (commune of Ndom, department of Sanaga-Maritime, Littoral Region). The dialect is also called ɓasóó ɓalikol ("Basso of the North"), or Adiangók ("Adiá of the cave"). This variety is centered at Logbikoy, and also the pilgrimage site of Ngok-Litouba (the "Rock of the Cave").

There are around 50,000 speakers.

== Orthography ==
Kogo uses the Latin script. Its alphabet is based on the General Alphabet of Cameroon Languages and consists of 7 vowels and 20 consonants.

Letters (upper case)	A	B	Ɓ	C	D	E	Ɛ	F	G	H	I	J	K	L	M	N	Ŋ	O	Ɔ	P	S	T	U	V	W	Y	Z
Letters (lower case)	a	b	ɓ	c	d	e	ɛ	f	g	h	i	j	k	l	m	n	ŋ	o	ɔ	p	s	t	u	v	w	y	z
IPA	a	b	ɓ	t͡ʃ	d	e	ɛ	f	ɡ	h	i	d͡ʒ	k	l	m	n	ŋ	o	ɔ	p	s	t	u	v	w	j	z
