= Basaa languages =

Basaa
- Linguistic classification: Niger–Congo?: Atlantic–Congo; Benue–Congo; Southern Bantoid; Bantu (Zone A.40, reduced); Basaa

Language codes
- ISO 639-3: –
- Glottolog: basa1283

The Basaa languages are a clade of Bantu languages coded Zone A.40 in Guthrie's classification. According to Nurse & Philippson (2003), the languages remaining from the formation of the Mbam group form a valid node. They are:

Basaa–Kogo (Bakoko), Rombi–Bankon.

Hijuk was listed as unclassified A.50 in Guthrie, but according to Ethnologue it is quite similar to Basaa.
