= Battle of Jabassi =

Battle during WWI

Coordinates: 4°27′N 9°58′E

- Part of the Kamerun campaign in World War I
Date	7 October 1914 – 14 October 1914 (1 week)
Location	Jabassi, German Kamerun
Result	British victory

Belligerents
(United Kingdom of Great Britain and Ireland) British Empire: British Nigeria	German Empire: German Kamerun

Commanders and leaders
(United Kingdom of Great Britain and Ireland) Gen. Edward Gorges	Cap. Haedicke

Strength
Unknown	Unknown

Casualties and losses
Unknown	4 Europeans killed 10 captured

The Battle of Jabassi or Battle of Yabassi was a pair of assaults on German positions at Jabassi on the Wuri river during the Kamerun campaign of World War I between German and British forces on 7 and 14 October 1914. The action resulted in British victory and their occupation of the station.

== Background ==
Allied landings at Douala and Victoria on 27 September, under the command of Major General C. M. Dobell, met little resistance. German forces who had been occupying the coast had withdrawn along the northern railway to Dschang, along the Wuri River to Jabassi, and along the midland railway to Edea. From these positions, the Allied commander feared the Germans could easily attack Douala. Due to heavy rains, roads to Dachang, Jabassi, and Edea were washed out and impassable; however, Dobell felt that high water in the Wuri River made a boat-borne assault on Jabassi feasible. Six companies of the West Africa Regiment, two from the 1st Nigerians, one from the Gold Coast Regiment, and about 100 Royal Navy sailors and marines were assigned to the task.

== Battle ==
=== First assault ===
On 7 October, British forces under the command of Brigadier General Edmund Howard Gorges sailed up the Wuri river in barges with four field guns including a 6-pounder gun placed on a dredger. They landed five kilometers away from Jabassi and marched their way through the jungle to the German entrenchments. Once in the thick bush, British forces lost unity and coordination. In open ground in front of German entrenchments, they came under intense machine gun fire which forced them to retreat back into the bush. After regrouping they attempted to flank the German forces but failed, forcing them to once again retreat. The order was given to withdraw back on the river to Duala. The Germans lost four of the 26 Europeans at Jabassi.

=== Second assault ===
The following week, on 14 October, the Wuri river was again high enough for another attempt to take Jabassi. With two six-inch artillery pieces and reinforcements, British forces landed on both banks of the Wuri and advanced towards the German entrenchments, while General Gorges coordinated the assault from a boat. This engagement was victorious for the British, capturing ten Europeans and the station.

== Aftermath ==
This battle resulted in further German withdrawal into the mountainous interior of Kamerun. It also gave more protection to the Allied landing forces at Douala and Victoria from a feared German counter-attack.
