= Nkam =

Coordinates: 4°27′16″N 9°57′56″E

- Department
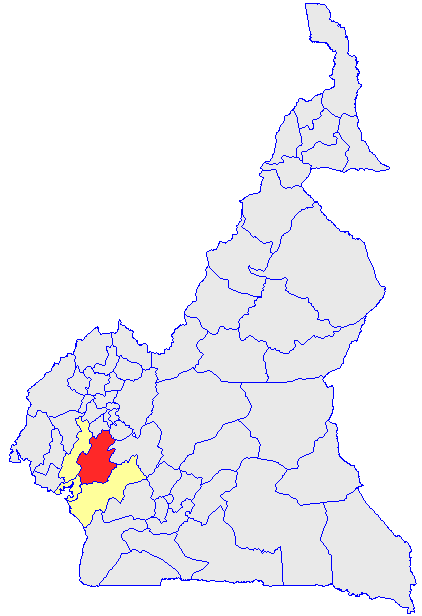
- Department location in Cameroon
- Country: Cameroon
- Province: Littoral Province
- Capital: Yabassi

Area
  - Total: 6,291 km^{2} (2,429 sq mi)

Population (2001)
  - Total: 66,979
  - Density: 10.65/km^{2} (27.58/sq mi)
- Time zone: UTC+1 (WAT)

Nkam is a department of Littoral Province in Cameroon. The department covers an area of 6,291 km^{2} and as of 2001 had a total population of 66,979. The capital of the department lies at Yabassi.

== Subdivisions ==
The department is divided administratively into 4 communes and in turn into villages.

=== Communes ===
- Ndobian
- Nkondjock
- Yabassi
- Yingui
