= Hijuk language =

Nearly extinct Bantu language of Cameroon

Hijuk
- Native to: Cameroon
- Native speakers: <15 (2018)
- Language family: Niger–Congo?: Atlantic–Congo; Benue–Congo; Bantoid; Bantu (Zone A); Bafia (A.50)? Basaa (A.40)?; Hijuk

Language codes
- ISO 639-3: hij
- Glottolog: hiju1238
- Guthrie code: A.501
- ELP: Hijuk

Hijuk is a nearly extinct Bantu language of Cameroon. Guthrie had left it unclassified within the Bafia languages (A.50), but according to Ethnologue, it has only 31% lexical similarity with Bafia, and 87% with Basaa.
