= Faʼ language =

Bantu language of Cameroon

Faʼ
- Balom
- Ləfaʼ
- Native to: Cameroon
- Native speakers: 15,000 (2010)
- Language family: Niger–Congo?: Atlantic–Congo; Benue–Congo; Bantoid; Bantu (Zone A); Bafia (A.50); Faʼ

Language codes
- ISO 639-3: lfa
- Glottolog: lefa1242
- Guthrie code: A.51

The Faʼ language, Ləfaʼ (also Fak or Lefa), is one of the Bantu languages of Cameroon.
