= Bill Rock =

Bill Rock (54°9′S 36°39′W) is a rock which lies 0.3 nautical miles (0.6 km) east of the south end of Grass Island in Stromness Bay, South Georgia. It was charted and named in 1928 by Discovery Investigations personnel.
