= Ndobian =

Coordinates: 4.9903°N 10.3734°E

- Commune and town
- Interactive map of Ndobian
- Country: Cameroon
- Time zone: UTC+1 (WAT)

Ndobian is a town and commune in Cameroon.

== See also ==
- Communes of Cameroon
