= Tonga, Cameroon =

Coordinates: 4.9699°N 10.6957°E

Tonga
- Commune and town
- Interactive map of Tonga
- Country: Cameroon
- Time zone: UTC+1 (WAT)

Tonga, Cameroon is a town and commune in Cameroon.

== Geography ==
The Tonga sub-division has three major village groups: Badoumga (Banounga), Baloua and Babitchoua. Its area is 342 km^{2} (132 sq mi) with a population of 15000. The capital of this subdivision is Tonga Town, which is 90 km (56 mi) from the regional capital Bafoussam and 30 km (19 mi) from the divisional capital Bangangte. Tonga is on the Yaounde Bafoussam road and is about 220 km (140 mi) from Yaounde, the capital of Cameroon. It is about 10 km (6.2 mi) from Makene, a bus stop along the Bafoussam Yaoundé highway.

== Economy ==
The population is 98% subsistence farmers producing food crops and cash crops like cocoa and coffee in small farms.

== Health ==
On the health front, the Tonga sub-division has 3 health facilities:

- Tonga Health and Social Welfare Center
- Tonga Catholic Health Center
- Maham Health Center

== Climate ==
The climate is equatorial, characterized by the alternation of two dry seasons and two rainy seasons.

== See also ==
- Communes of Cameroon
