= Ngoa-Ekélé =

- Location in Cameroon
- Coordinates: 3°59′10″N 11°49′59″E
- Country: Cameroon
- Province: Centre Province
- Division: Mfoundi Division
- Elevation: 710 m (2,330 ft)

Population (2005)
  - Total: 27,714

Ngoa Ekélé is a neighborhood in the Yaoundé III district of Yaoundé, Cameroon. It borders the neighborhoods of Olezoa to the south, Mvolyé to the west and Melen to the north. It is separated from the administrative center to the east by the Valley of Death or Nkol Nguet. The district is built on a ridge that culminates at 793 meters, it is the Plateau Atemengue.

== Etymology ==
"Ngoa Ekélé" is an Ewondo expression composed of "Ngoag", the stone, the rock, the pebble, and "Ekélé" meaning "is hung". Literally "Ngoa Ekele" could mean "(The) Stone (is) perched", "(The) Stone (is) suspended", "(The) Stone (is) hung".

== History ==
In 1911, during the German colonial period, a so-called indigenous customary court or "Tribunal de races" sat in this place and was presided over alternately by Joseph Atemengue (en) and Onambele Mbazoa. The decisions of this court were severe. Hanging over the heads of the defendants, they fell cleanly like a cleaver. "Ngoa Ekélé" would therefore refer to these court decisions as "stones perched" above the head of each defendant and ready to fall on it.

== Population ==
The population of Ngoa Ekele is mostly students. The students come from the ten regions of Cameroon, the population of the district is cosmopolitan.

== Institutions ==
Ngoa Ekélé is a student, political and military district.

== Education ==
- Panoramic view of some of the institutions in Ngoa Ekelle
- Ngoa Ekelle Castle
- Ngoa Ekélé has many schools and universities

=== Basic education ===
- Departmental elementary school
- Mobile Gendarmerie Primary School
- Public nursery and elementary school of Plateau Atemengue

=== Secondary education ===
- Government High School Ngoa Ekélé, former CES
- Government technical college Ngoa Ekélé
- General Leclerc High School

=== Higher education ===
- National Institute of Youth and Sports (INJS)
- University of Yaoundé I
- National Post and Telecommunication and ICT College (SUP'PTIC)
- Advanced School of Mass Communication (ASMAC)
- Institute of Demographic Training and Research (IFORD)

== Politics ==
- Monument of the reunification.jpg
- The headquarters of the National Assembly of Cameroon is located in Ngoa Ekélé. There is also the Monument of the reunification of Cameroon.

== Military ==
- The military stadium of Yaoundé (2500 seats)
- The Military headquarters

== Health ==
- Yaounde University Hospital
- Chantal Biya International Reference Center

== Gallery ==
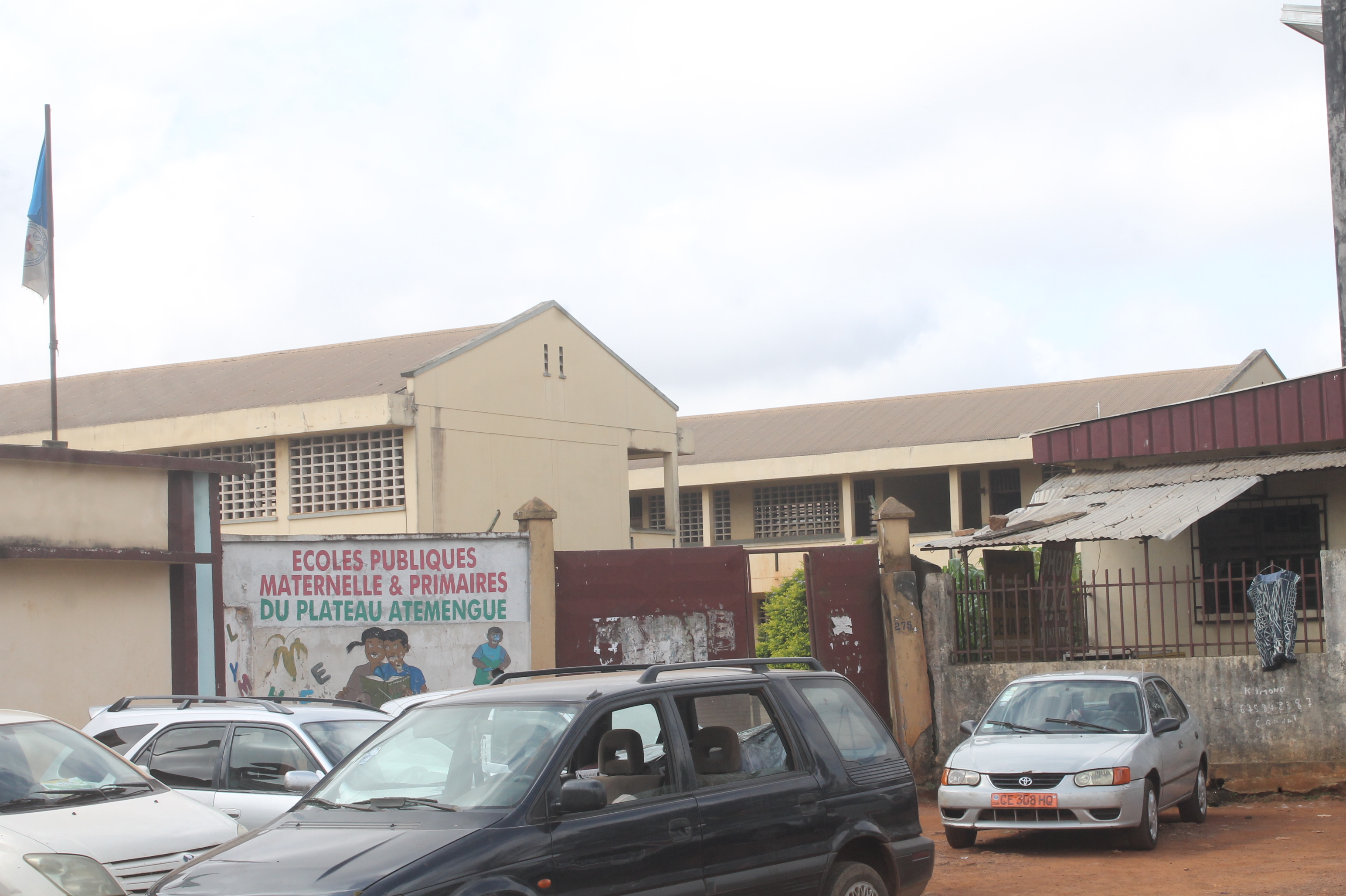
Public nursery and primary schools of Plateau Atemengue

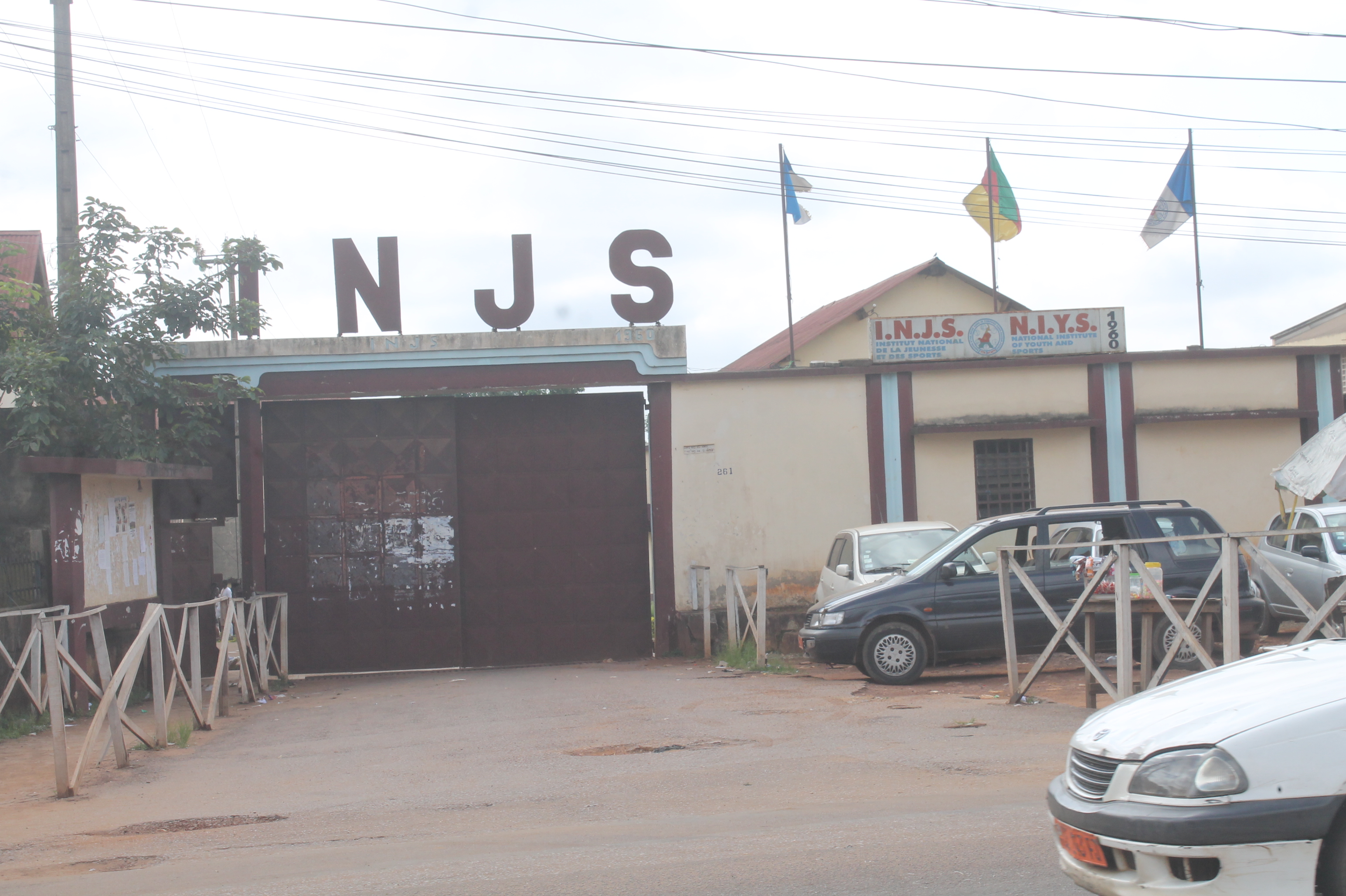
National Institute of Youth and Sports (INJS)

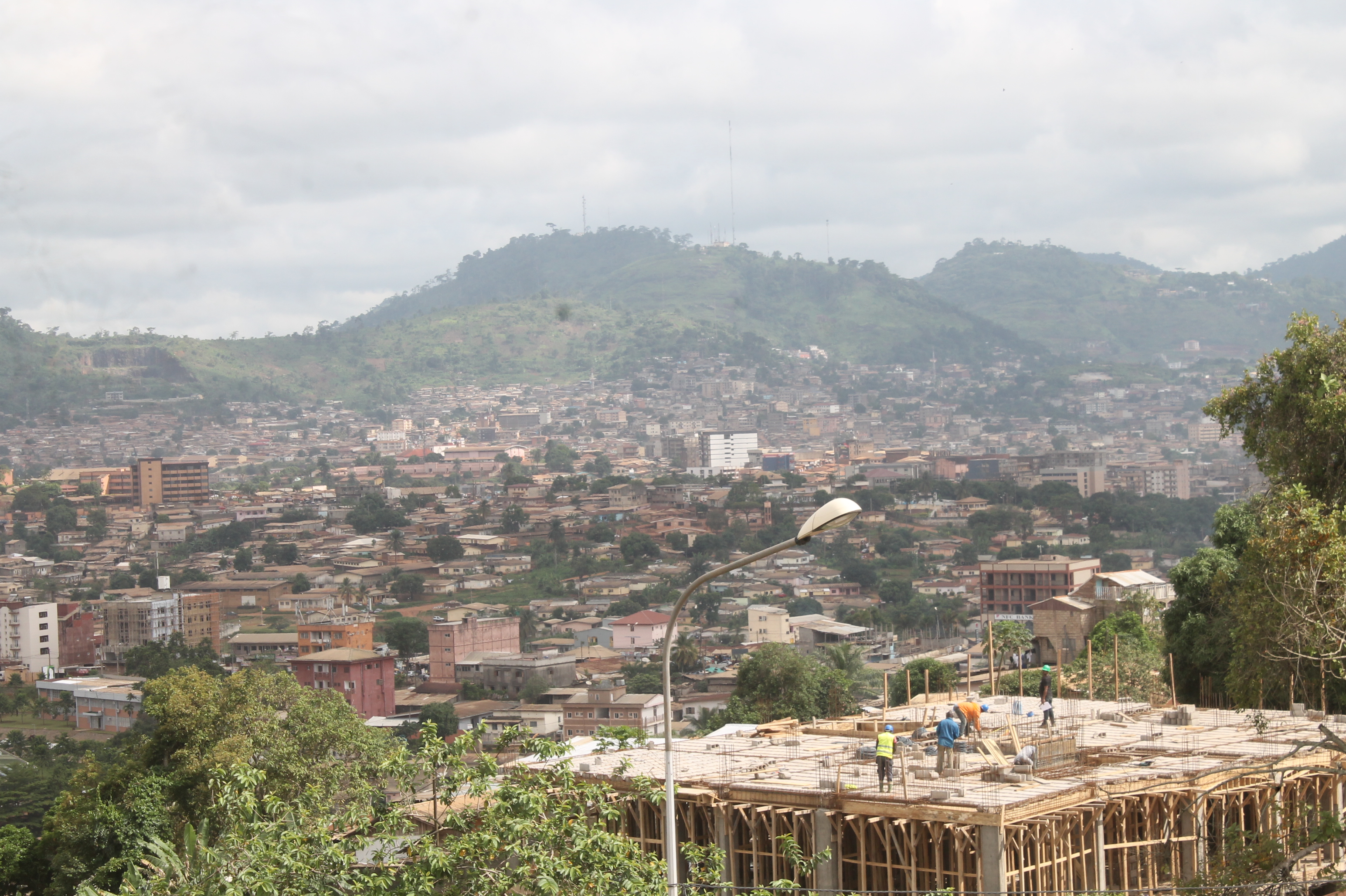
Panoramic view from Ngoa Ekelle to Melen

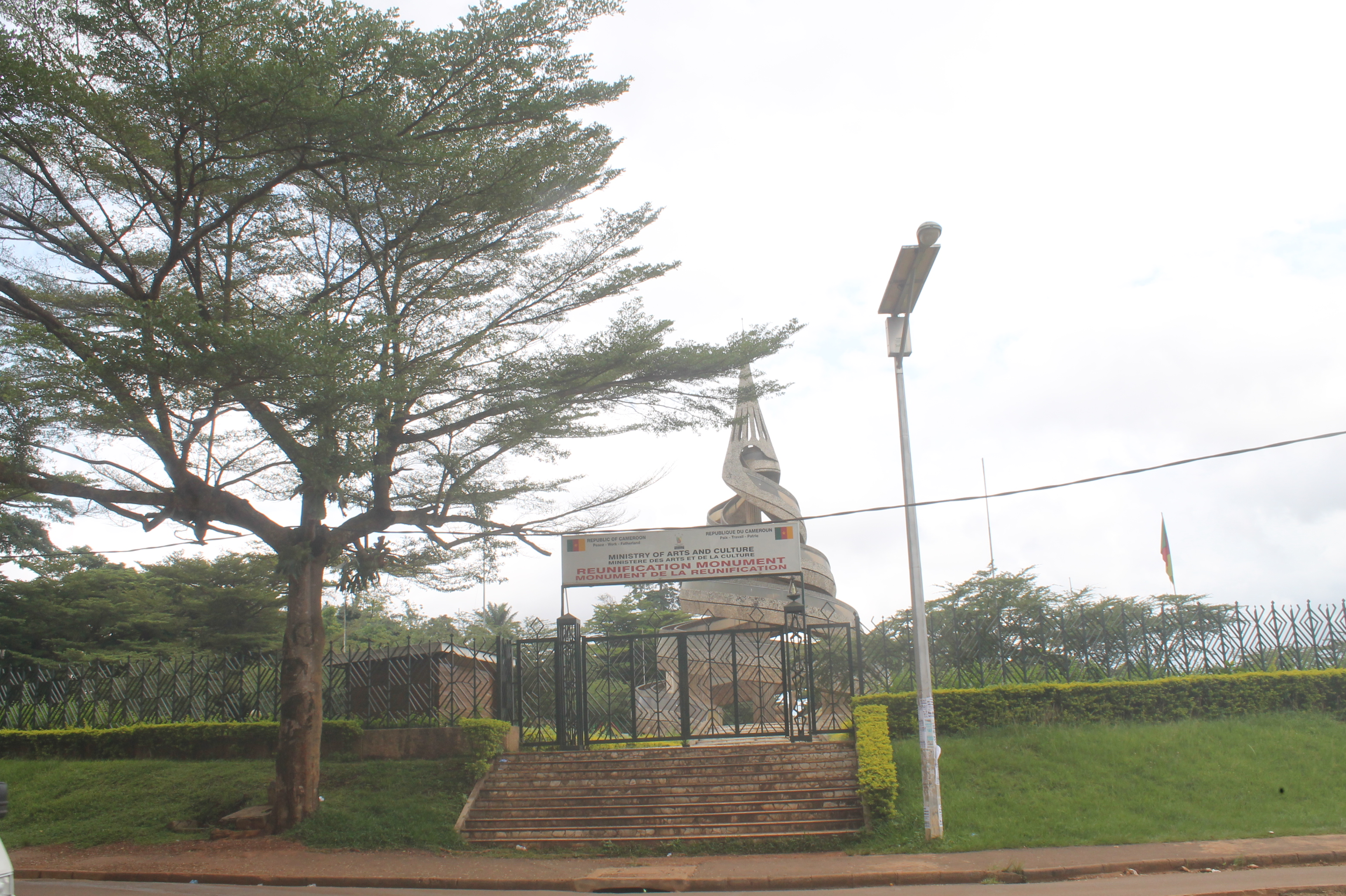
Monument of the reunification
