= Bafia people =

Bafia
Ɓəkpaʼ
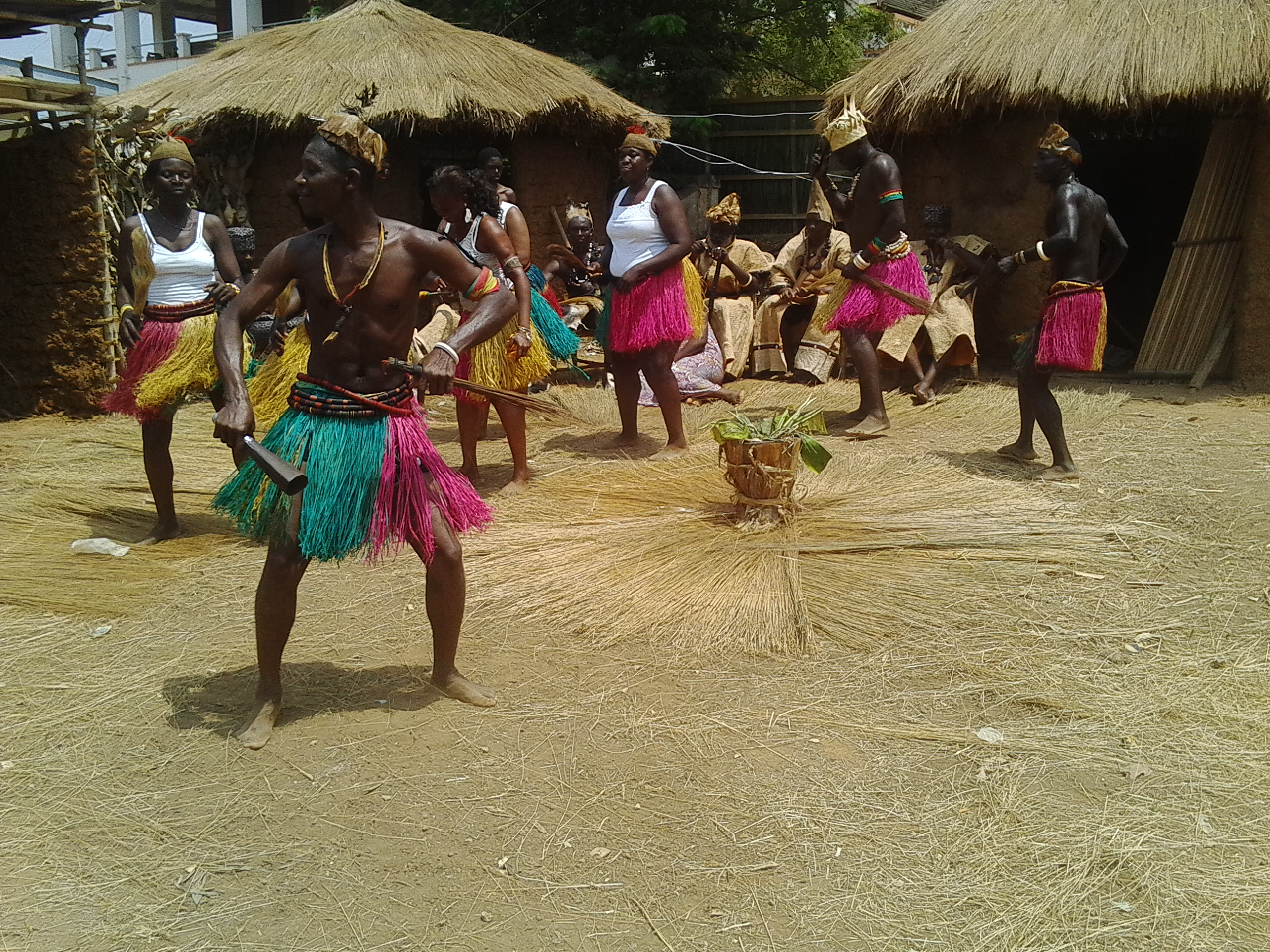
- Danse Bafia

Total population
- 127,000

Regions with significant populations
- Centre Region (Cameroon)

Languages
- Bafia

Religion
- Catholicism

Related ethnic groups
- Other Bantu peoples and Bamun, Tikar

The Bafia (Ɓəkpaʼ) people are a central African ethnic group that inhabit the Mbam and Sanaga River regions in the Centre Region of Cameroon. They are culturally related to the Bamum and Tikar people.

== Names ==
A Bafia father will give his child a personal name to which his own name (patronym) is appended. For instance, a father named "Keman a Ndiomo" may call his son "Bitegni a Keman". The "a" in the middle stands for "son of".

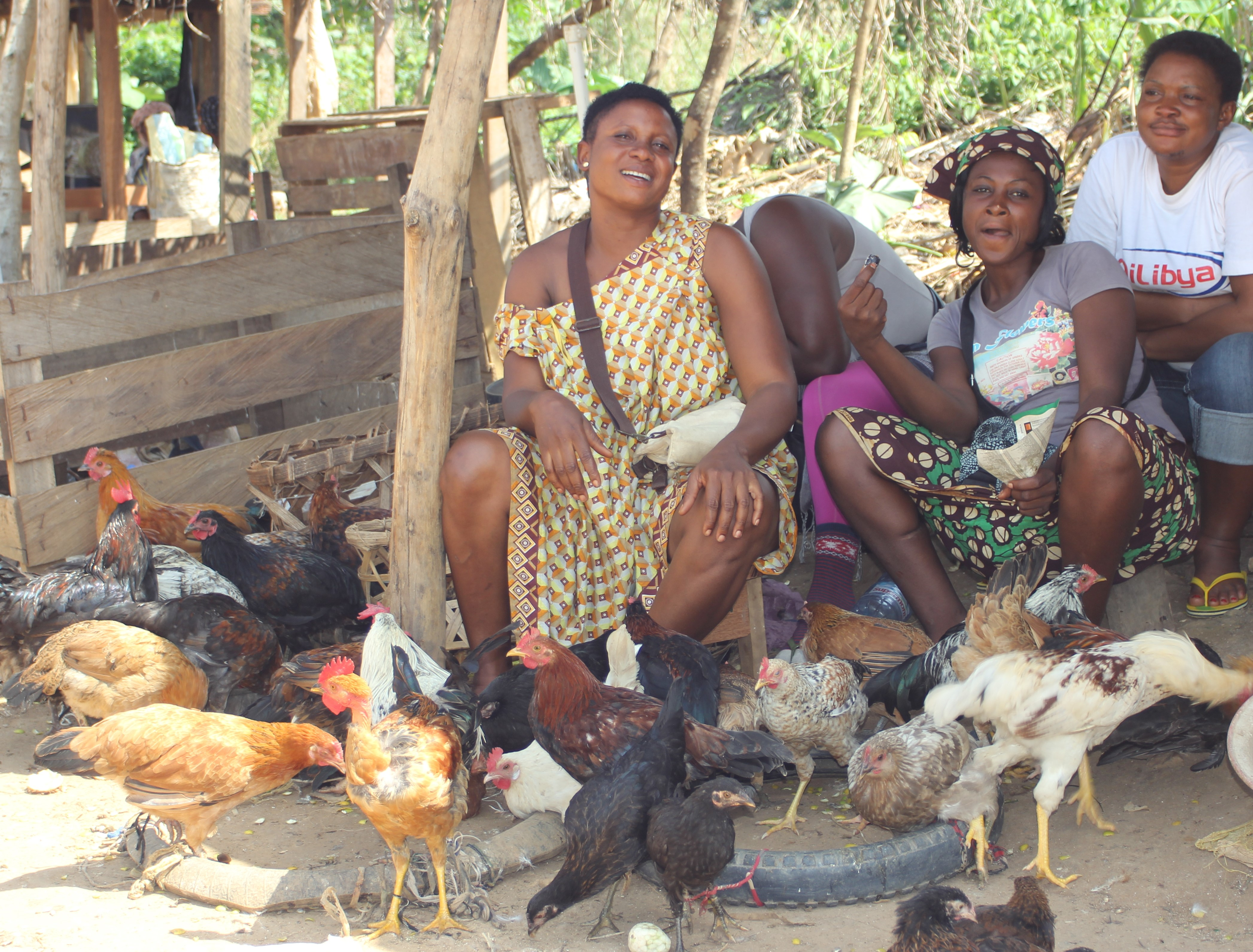
Pepper saleswoman

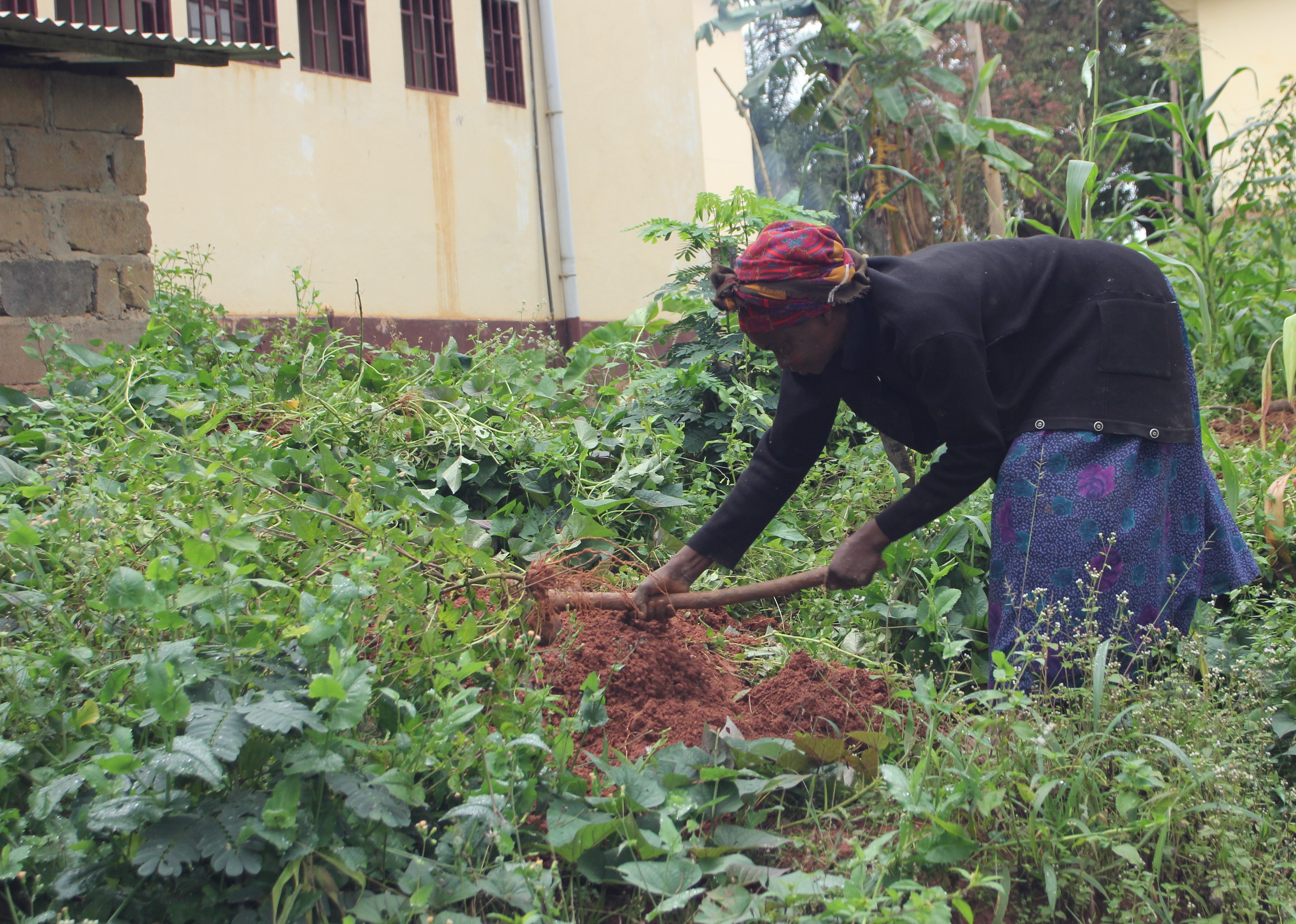
Harvesting yams on a local farm

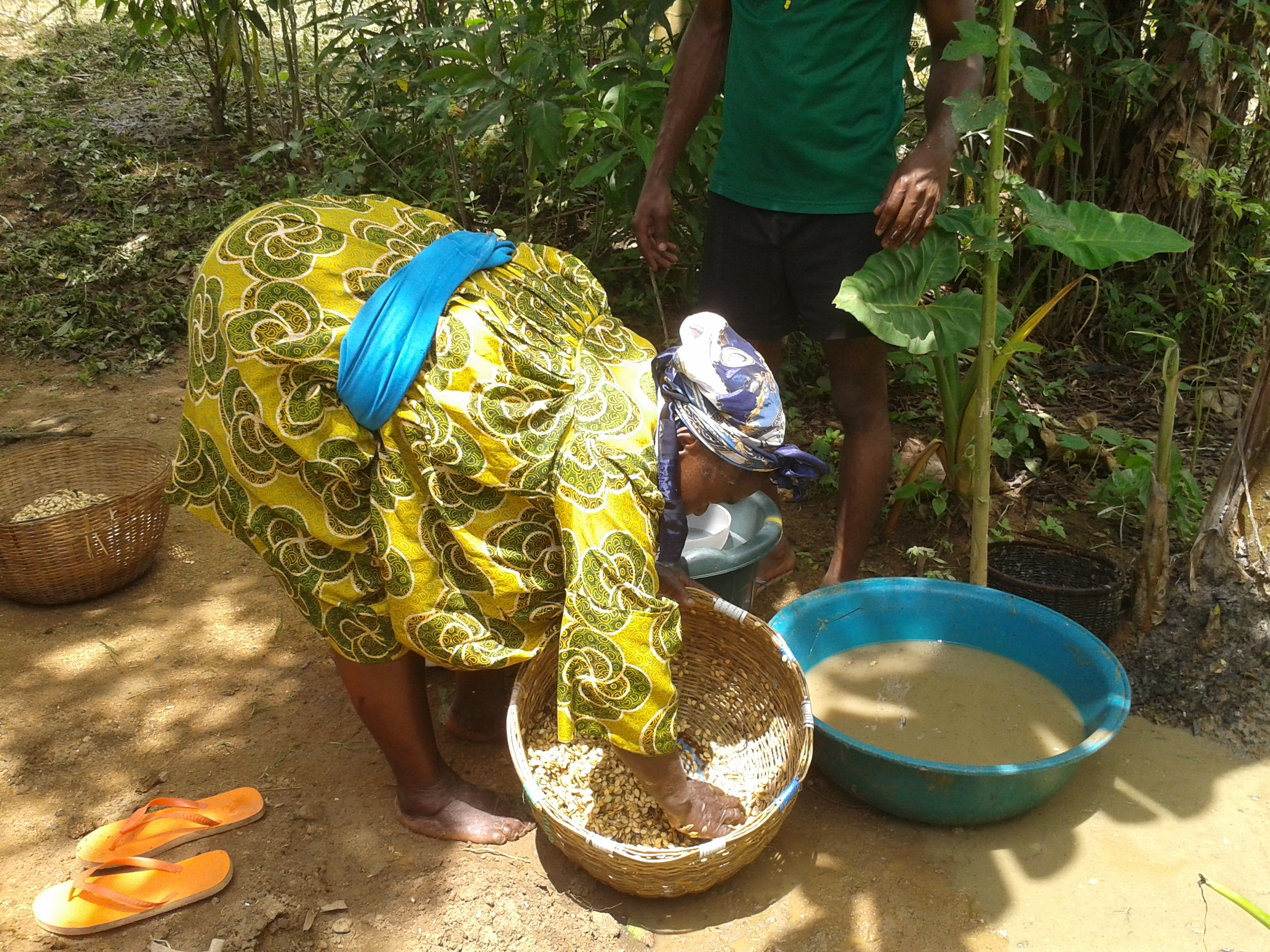
Peanut harvest

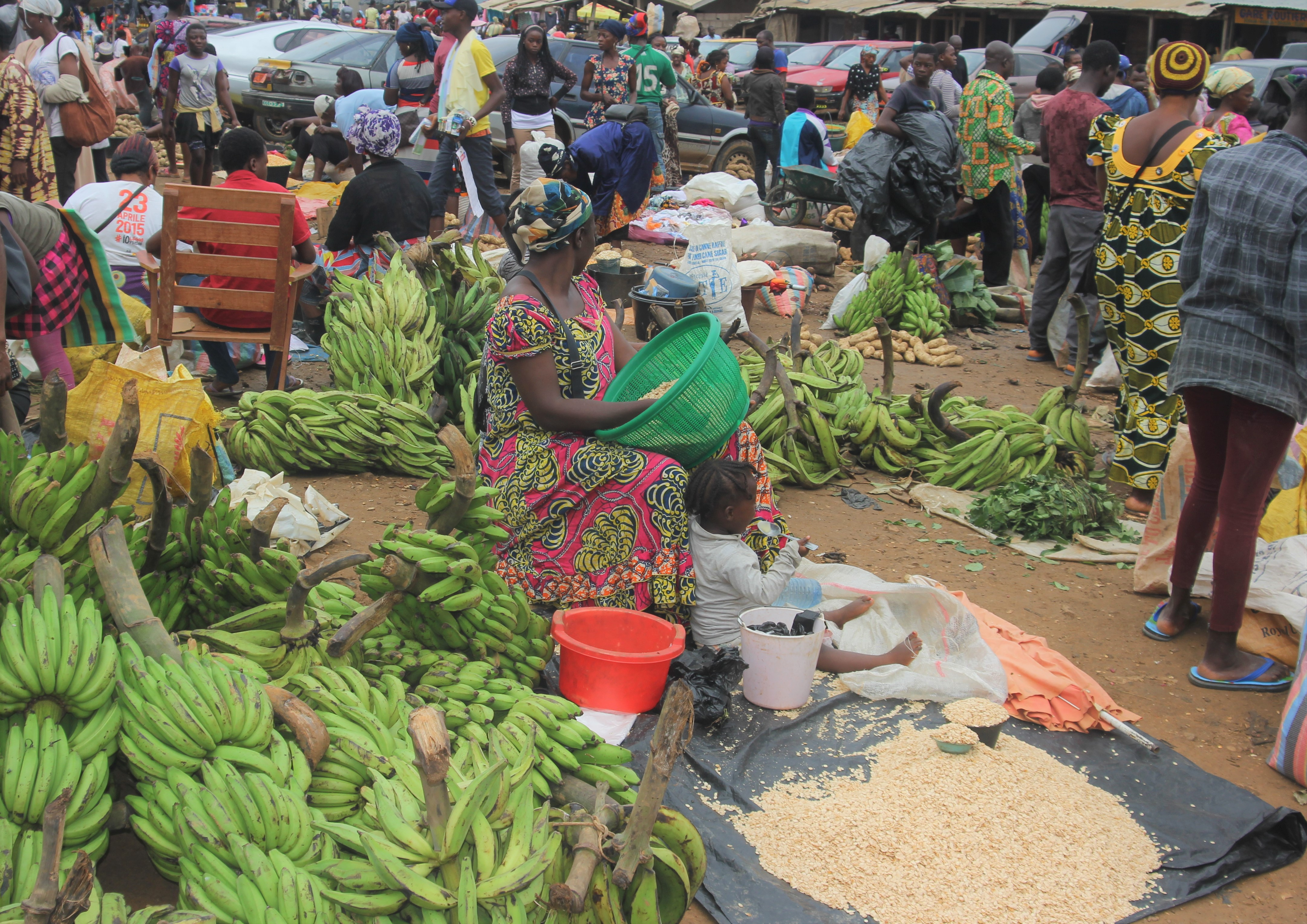
Vegetable market in Bafia, Cameroon

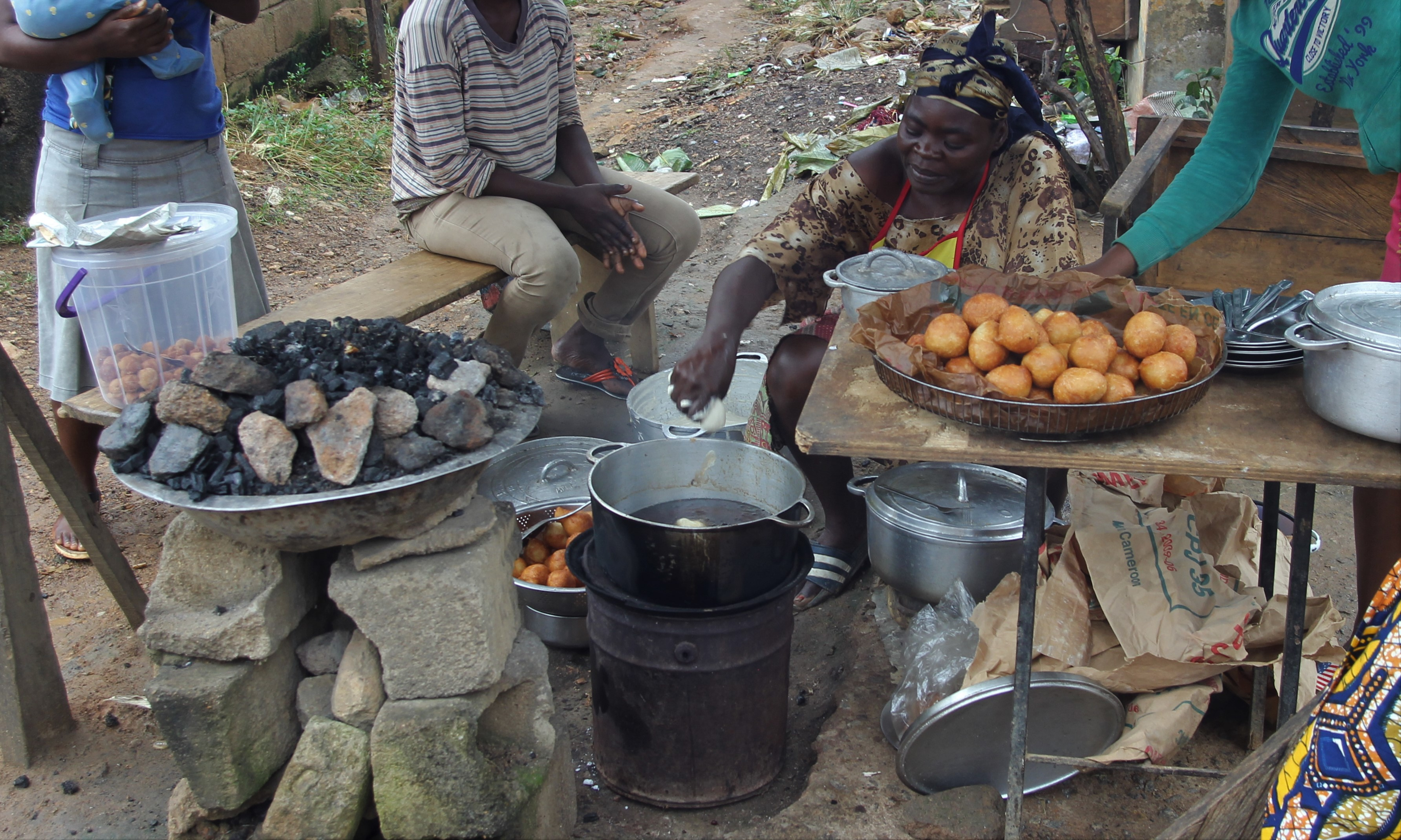
Freshly fried donuts in Bafia, Cameroon

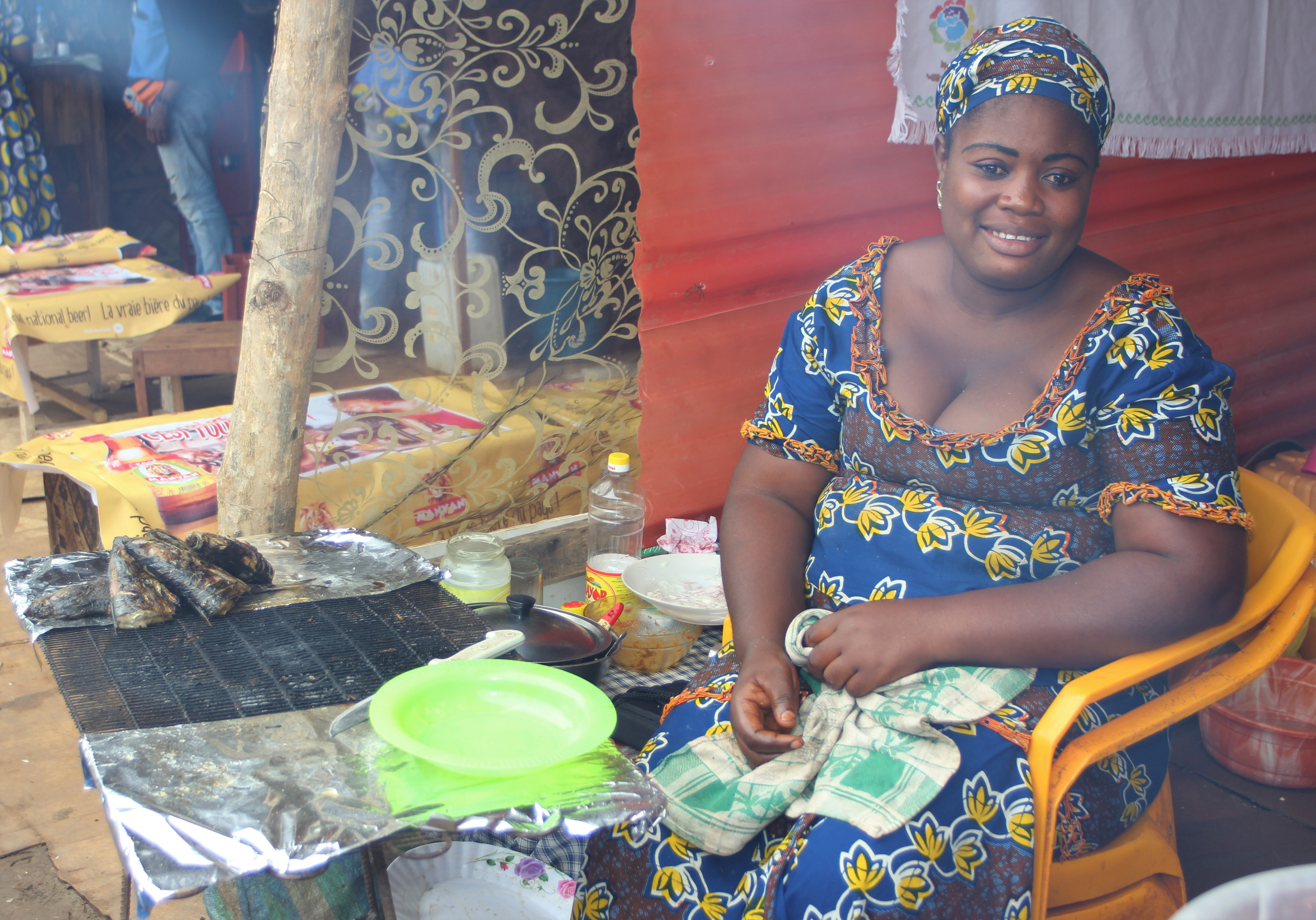
Grilled fish in Bafia, Cameroon

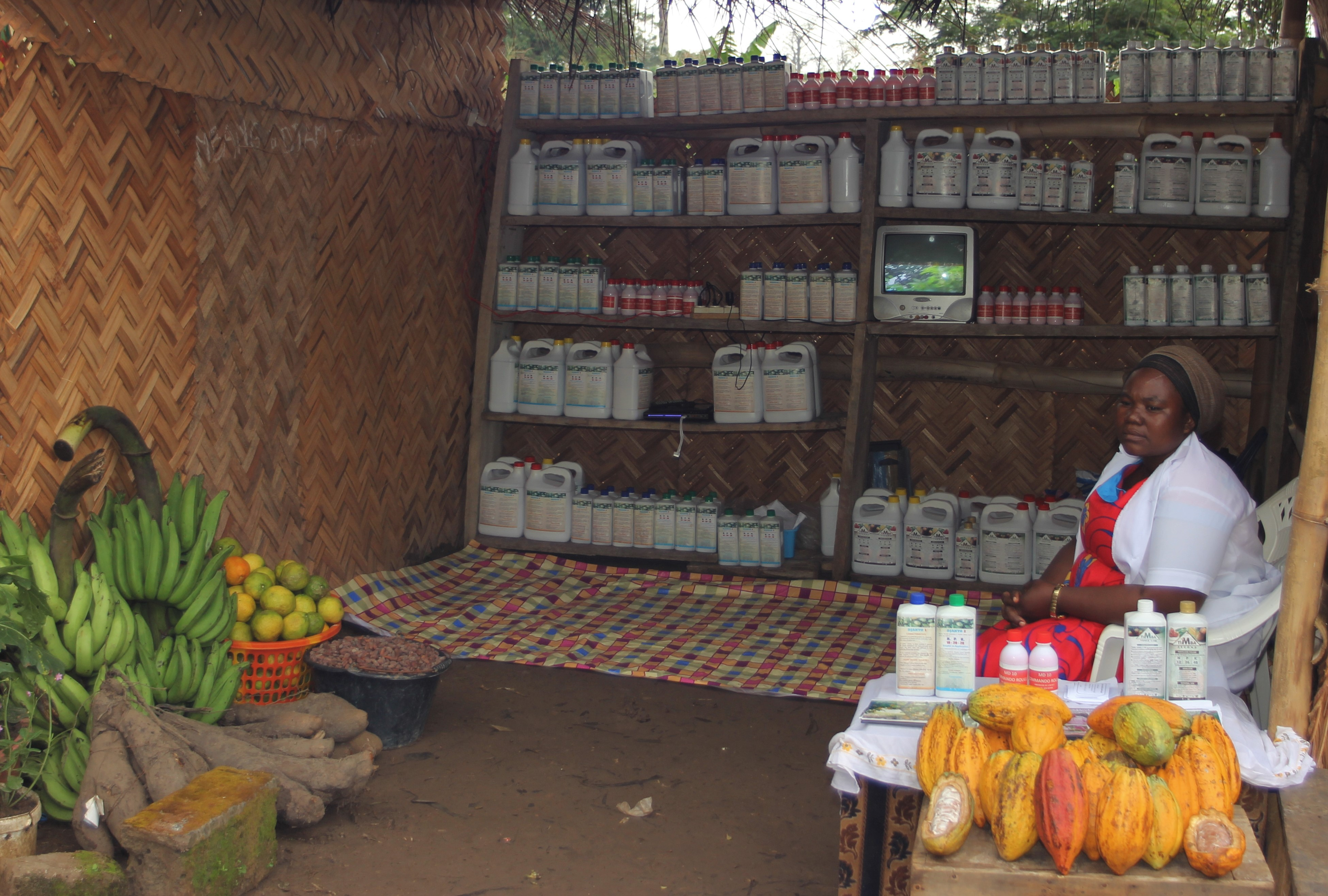
Raw cocoa bean vendor in Bafia, Cameroon

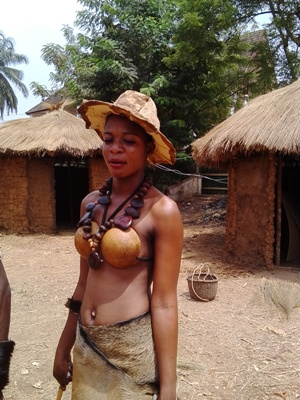
Bafia dancer

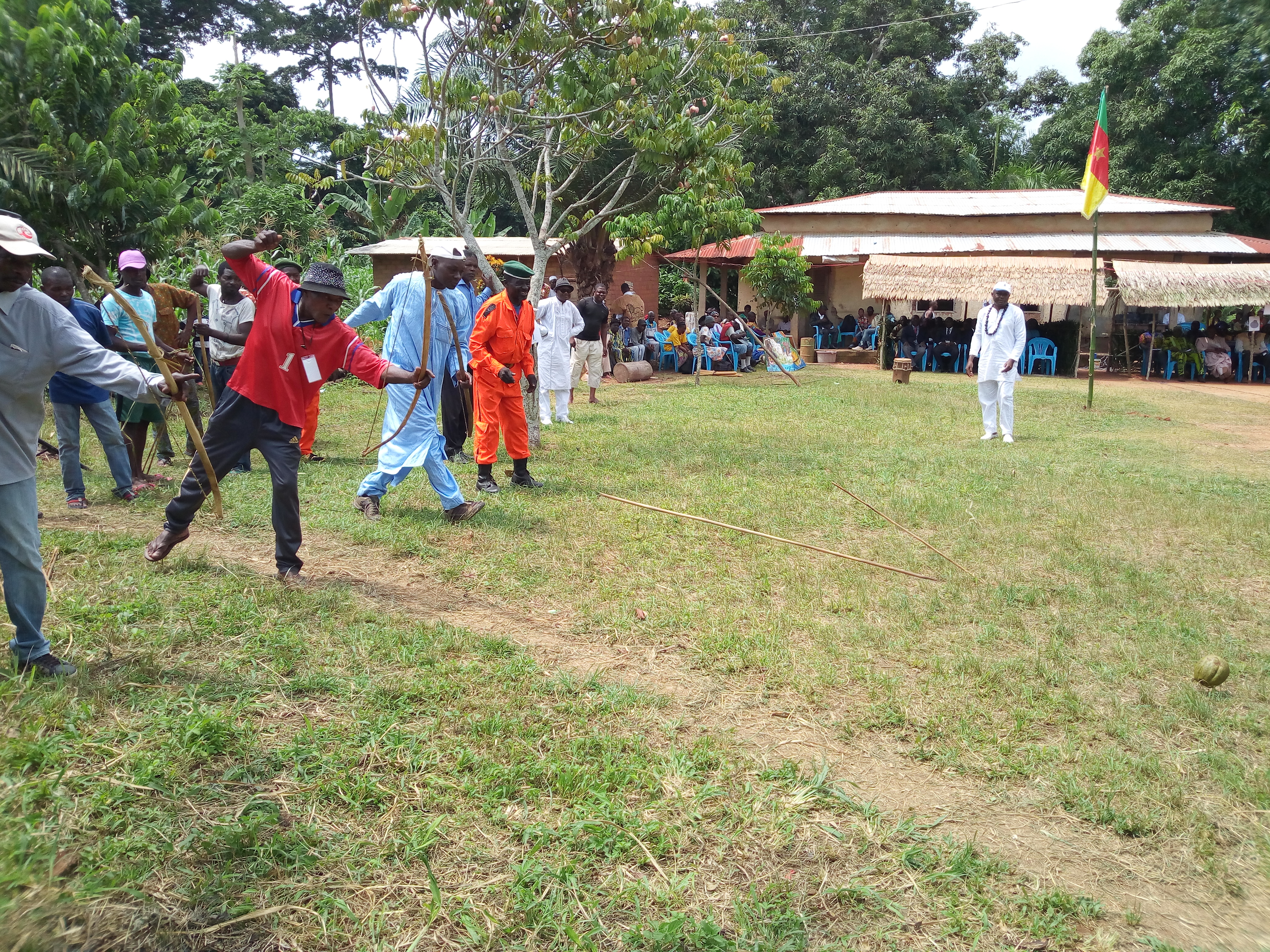
Kákámba

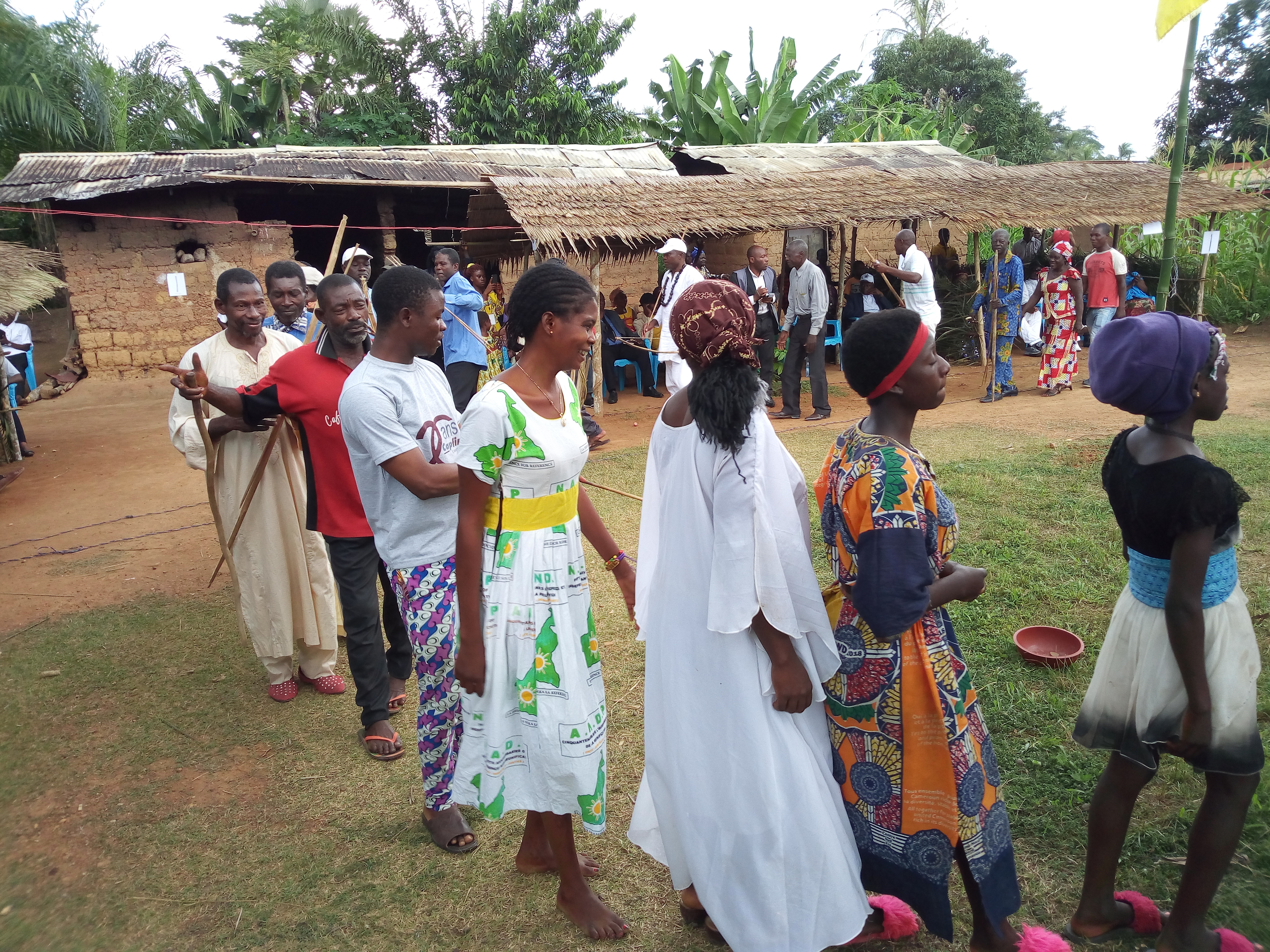
Mankana, ceremonial

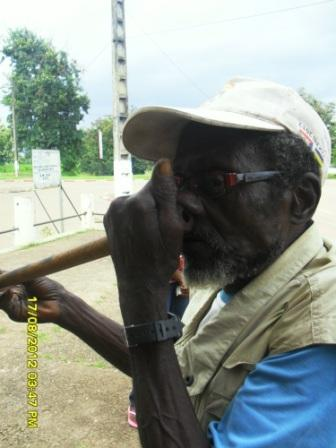
Nostril flute

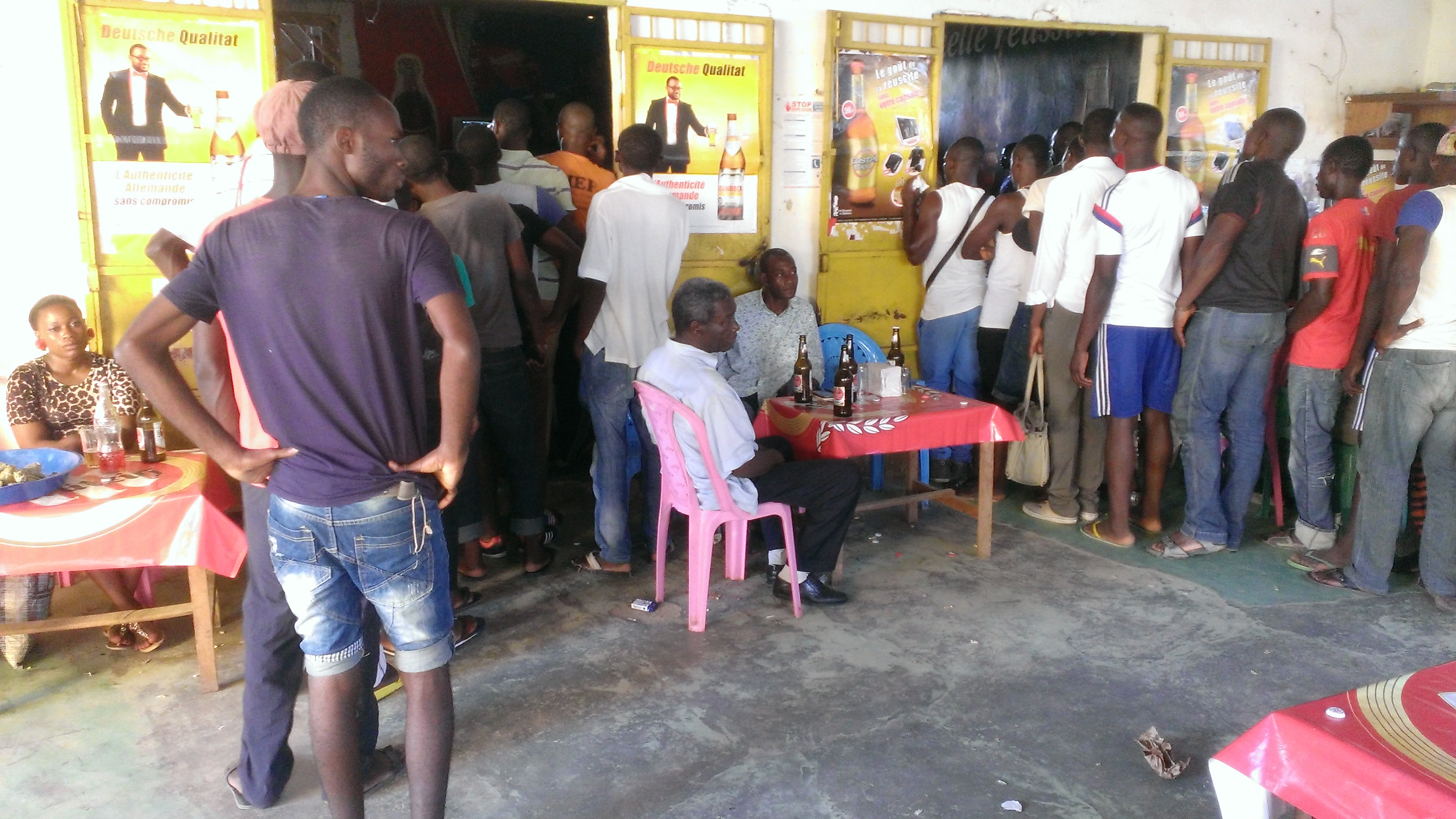
Spectators of a football match

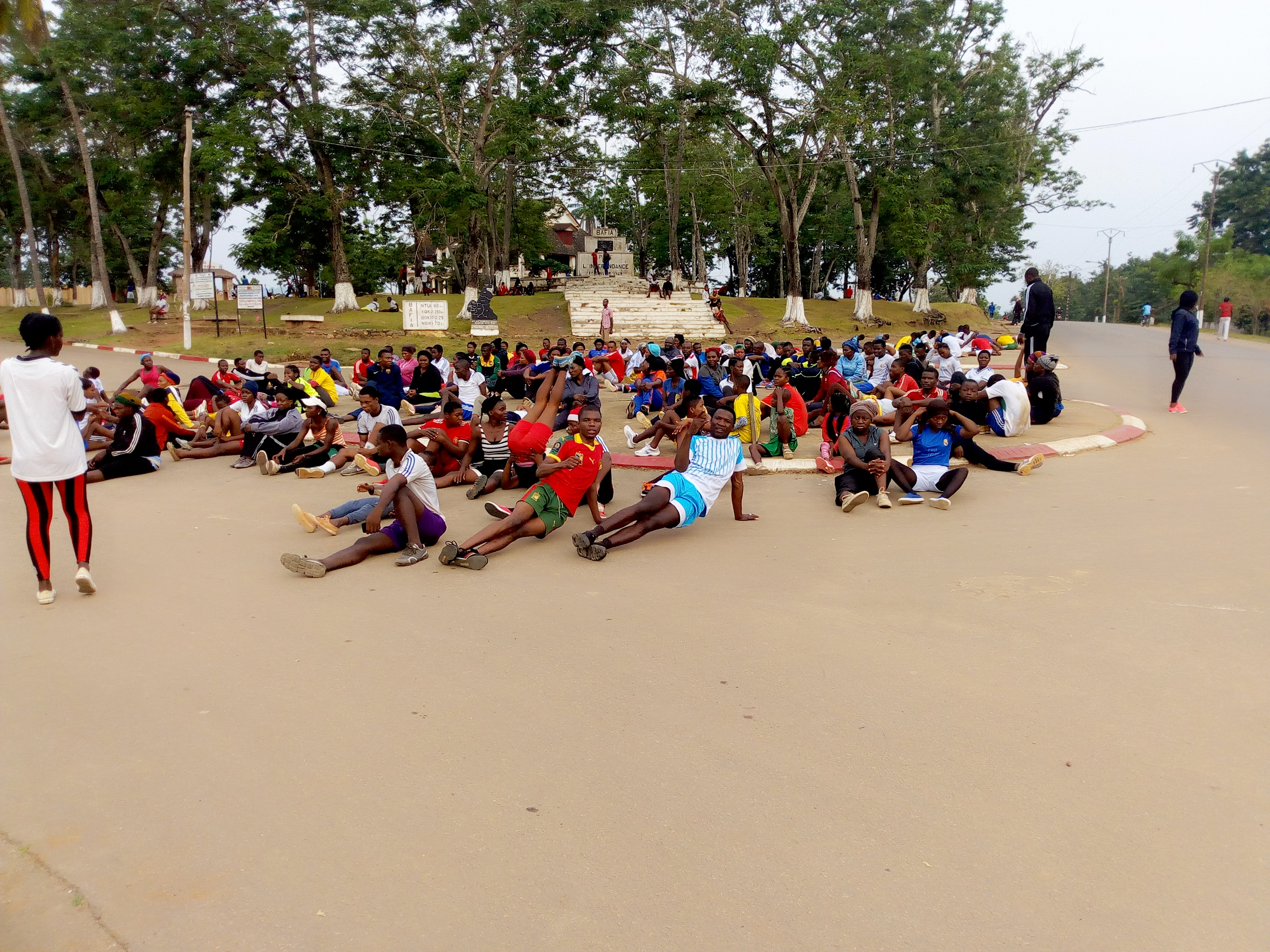
Sport for all

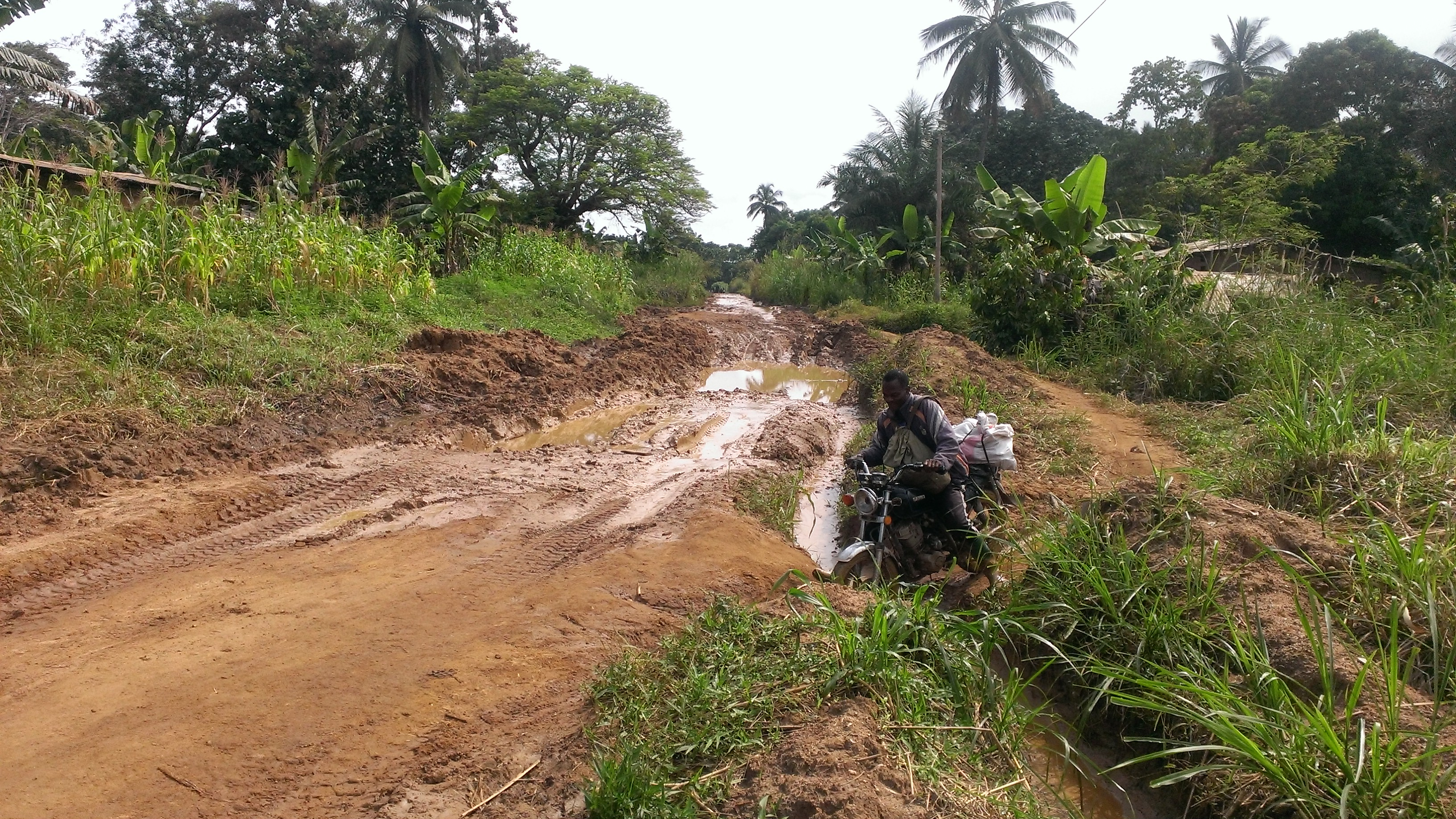
Biatsota-Bafia road

== Dance ==
The traditional dance of the Bafia is seen to convey a sense of heightened excitement and joy through posture and facial expressions. Dances are traditionally held after successful harvests, although they may also be performed during engagements, weddings, and other official events.

== Religion ==
The creation myth amongst the Bafia was that the world developed from an egg. Both feminine sexual forces, represented by a cave or hollow tree, and masculine sexual forces, represented by a snake or vine, were involved. Darkness is said to have surrounded the egg before opening; Bafia people believe people do wrong because of the love they have for the darkness, though darkness cannot directly cause wrongdoing. Bafia people do not believe in the afterlife; instead, everything returns to the egg, from which everything except the darkness surrounding the egg came.

There is a maker figure, referred to as tatabell (from tata meaning "father" and bell meaning "intelligent").

The turtle is respected as a traditional totem animal; it is identified with tatabell, and thus they have forbidden the killing or eating of the animal.

Bafia people believe that long ago, one of their people had been killed. During a conversation between the Bafia king and other local leaders to identify the killer, the Bafia king saw a turtle passing by. He was amazed by the animal: because a turtle carries his own house, he has his home with him where ever he goes, and a turtle's slow pass gives the impression that the world doesn't affect him. The king decided that the turtle was the perfect representative of tatabell. The king decided that if he placed the turtle among the suspects of the murder, the direction in which the turtle chose to walk would expose the killer.

The Bafia identify the hunt mentality and capability of their people with the mygale spider. The Bafia believe that every part of the spider is designed to hunt, including its eyes, which they are believed to see the future, and its web.

In the centre of the region inhabited by the Bafia is a lion statue. Lions represent Cameroon to the Bafia, and the Bafia identify with the mind and spirit of the lion.

Today, the dominant religion is Protestant Christianity (called Mareucana); Islam (called Moussouloumi) is a minority religion.

== List of Bafia dishes ==
Bafia people come from a Hunter tribe so they eat and dress(traditionally) like hunter Often like many other tribes in Africa, the majority of the foods and plates are vegetarians but because bafia are hunter a piece of meat should be in every plates, often bafia people hunt wild beats and bush animal and the major market in bafia is a wild beats market. Almost every bafia eat wild beasts in their plates

- Bitosso (generally eaten with some sort of Maize pudding known locally as kipen (kipain))
- Kidjan (Kidjan ki Tchen)
- Gbarak (sticky saucy made with Okra and bush meat)
- Koum-koum
- Tien ti meukaaba
- Tien ti nguita (sweet potato leaves)
- Bichongneu
- Zaap (bita leaves)
- Bieeloe
- Mouleuk (for seasoning)

== List of Bafia villages ==
- Bapep
- Biabiyakan
- Sanam
- Biamesse
- Biamo
- Bitang
- Dang
- Donenkeng
- Goufan
- Gouife
- Isèri
- Kiki
- Koro
- Lablé
- Mouko
- Nyamsong
- Nyokon
- Roum
- Rimis
- Rionon
- Tchekani
- Yakan
