= Tibea language =

Bantu language spoken in Cameroon

Ngayaba
- Tɨɓɛa
- Native to: Cameroon
- Native speakers: (1,400 cited 1992)
- Language family: Niger–Congo?: Atlantic–Congo; Benue–Congo; Bantoid; Bantu (Zone A); Bafia (A.50); Ngayaba

Language codes
- ISO 639-3: ngy
- Glottolog: tibe1274
- Guthrie code: A.54

Ngayaba, also known as Tɨɓɛa or Djanti, is a Bantu language spoken in three villages in Cameroon.
