= Rombi language =

Bantu language

Lombi
- Native to: Cameroon
- Region: Southwest region
- Native speakers: 3,000 (2001)
- Language family: Niger–Congo?: Atlantic–Congo; Benue–Congo; Southern Bantoid; Bantu (Zone A); Basaa (A.40); Rombi–Bankon; Lombi

Language codes
- ISO 639-3: bbi
- Glottolog: baro1252
- Guthrie code: A.41
- ELP: Barombi

Rombi (Lombi) is a Bantu language spoken in the Meme department of the Southwest Province of southwestern Cameroon by the Barombi (Barumbi, Balombi) people. It has a lexical similarity of 86% with Bankon, which is spoken in the nearby Moungo department of Littoral Province.
