= Bafia language =

Bantu language spoken in Cameroon

Bafia
- Kpaʼ
- Rɨkpaʼ
- Native to: Cameroon
- Ethnicity: Bafia people
- Native speakers: 67,000 (2005)
- Language family: Niger–Congo?: Atlantic–Congo; Benue–Congo; Bantoid; Bantu (Zone A); Bafia languages (A.50); Bafia

Language codes
- ISO 639-3: ksf
- Glottolog: bafi1243
- Guthrie code: A.53

- People: Ɓəkpaʼ
- Language: Rɨkpaʼ

Bafia or Kpaʼ is a Bantu language spoken by 70,000 Bafia people in Cameroon according to 2005 figures. It is used in the Bafia subdivision of the Mbam and Inoubou Division in Center Province in southwestern Cameroon. Speakers refer to the language as Rɨkpaʼ and to themselves as Ɓəkpaʼ (Bekpak).

Pey (Rɨpeʔ) is sometimes counted as a dialect but is quite different and may instead be a variety of Kaalong.
