= Yingui =

Coordinates: 4°32′N 10°18′E

- Commune and town
- Interactive map of Yingui
- Country: Cameroon
- Time zone: UTC+1 (WAT)

Yingui is a town and commune in Cameroon.

== See also ==
- Communes of Cameroon
