= Yabassi =

- Commune and town
- Location in Cameroon
- Coordinates: 4°27′30″N 9°58′15″E
- Country: Cameroon
- Region: Littoral Region
- Department: Nkam
- Time zone: UTC+1 (WAT)

Yabassi is a town and commune in western Cameroon, and capital of the Nkam department. Its population in 2001 was estimated at 12,000. The main dialect spoken is the Yabassi. However, there are also other dialects originating in the Nkam which are spoken.

== History ==
At the time of the German protectorate in Cameroon, Yabassi was a commercial hub and strategic town. The Battle of Jabassi took place near here during the Kamerun campaign of World War I. The city was once cut in two but not anymore thanks to the bridge that connects the Nkam administrative center in the old neighborhood called Ndokbele.

== Economy ==
The communal economy relies mainly on rural agriculture. The sector employs over 90% of the population. The main agricultural products are food crops (cocoyam, cassava, potato, yam, plantain, etc.). In recent years, there has also been a proliferation of oil palm cultivation. This is made possible thanks to the fertile land in the area. Small business, particularly in the main town is the second most important trade. Due to its dense forest, Yabassi is being exploited by loggers, mostly Asian companies.

The city is handicapped by the lack of paved roads, making it difficult to travel the 100 km separating the city from the economic capital of Cameroon, Douala.

== See also ==
- Communes of Cameroon
