= Nkondjock =

Coordinates: 4.1682°N 10.0807°E

- Commune and town
- Interactive map of Nkondjock
- Country: Cameroon
- Time zone: UTC+1 (WAT)

Nkondjock is a town and commune in Cameroon.

== See also ==
- Communes of Cameroon
