= Clarias microspilus =

Conservation status
- Endangered (IUCN 3.1)

Scientific classification
- Kingdom: Animalia
- Phylum: Chordata
- Class: Actinopterygii
- Order: Siluriformes
- Family: Clariidae
- Genus: Clarias
- Species: C. microspilus

Binomial name
- Clarias microspilus H. H. Ng & Hadiaty, 2011
- Clarias microspilus (Sumatra)

Species of fish

Clarias microspilus is a species of clariid catfish from Sumatra. It is known from short coastal rivers that drain the western face of the Leuser Mountain Range, in Aceh Province

== Habitat & distribution ==
It can be found in still bodies of water around tributaries, swamps, and blackwater ponds. The holotype was collected in Pasilembang, alongside paratypes collected from Kandang, Pucuk Lembang, Suaq Belimbing, and blackwater creeks alongside the Tapaktuan-Subulussalam road. It therefore could be found in Mount Leuser National Park.

== Characteristics ==
Collected in 1999, the holotype for this specimen was noted to be of a length of 136.1 mm (5.36 in) SL, with the 5 paratypes also recorded ranging from 127.4 to 233.2 mm (5.02 to 9.18 in). This species is distinguishable from all other Southeast Asian forest Clarias species (except for C. intermedius, C. insolitus, C. meladerma, C. olivaceus and C. planiceps) by the combination of the following characters:

- a relatively short, cylindriform body
- a serrated pectoral spine (pectoral fin bone)
- ovoid eyes

It is distinguishable from C. intermedius and C. meladerma by:

- a longer distance between the tip of the occipital process (most dorsal skull bone) and the base of the first ray of the dorsal fin,

from C. insolitus, C. olivaceus and C. planiceps by:

- a deeper body and wider head,

from C. intermedius specifically from:

- having fewer number of rays in some fins (specifically 64–68 vs. 70–72 dorsal-fin rays and 51–56 vs. 61–62 anal-fin rays),

from C. insolitus by:

- having a shorter distance between the tip of the occipital process and the base of the first ray of the dorsal fin (as opposed from C. intermedius and C. meladerma),

and finally from C. meladerma in:

- having more serrations on the anterior edge of the pectoral spine

Preserved specimens have been noted to be violet-gray color, slowly fading to pale-gray on ventral surfaces. Dorsal, caudal and anal fins are also violet-gray, with a very thin margin of hyaline. Barbels are violet-gray from above, whilst pale gray from below. The specimens were preserved in 70% ethanol.

== See also ==
- Clarias batrachus
- Clarias nieuhofii
- Clarias pseudoleiacanthus
- Clarias kapuasensis
- Clarias intermedius
- Clarias pseudoleiacanthus
