= Clarias insolitus =

Conservation status
- Data Deficient (IUCN 3.1)

Scientific classification
- Kingdom: Animalia
- Phylum: Chordata
- Class: Actinopterygii
- Order: Siluriformes
- Family: Clariidae
- Genus: Clarias
- Species: C. insolitus

Binomial name
- Clarias insolitus H. H. Ng, 2003
- Clarias insolitus (Borneo)

Species of fish

Clarias insolitus is a catfish within the genus Clarias, found in the upper drainage of the Barito River, in Kalimantan, Indonesian Borneo.

== Habitat ==
It lives in mostly small streams in the Barito Ulu region, literally "upstream Barito". Specific habitat details have not been mentioned .

== Characteristics ==
Collected as recent as 1991, the holotype length was 122.5 mm (or 4.8 inches) in SL, with 7 paratypes collected from the same area ranging from 53.5 to 139.7 mm (2.1-5.5 inches), though it hasn't been inferred about the specimen's matuirty status. The diagnosis has been defined by:

- possessing canal pores on the head and body visible to the naked eye
- possessing anterior fontanelles in the shape of a knife

It is further distinguishable from other clariids from the following characteristics (except for C. intermedius, C. meladerma, C. olivaceus, and C. planiceps):

- having prominent serrations on the front edge of the pectoral spine
- lacking white spots across its body

Further characteristics include:

- a head with depressed form
- skull oftentimes not readily visible, yet sometimes evident
- occipital process (dorsal skull bone) acutely rounded
- ovoid eyes
- a gill membrane free from isthmus

Coloration has been noted to be violet-gray (or plum) in lateral and dorsal areas, with dorsal, anal and pectoral fins with the same coloring, sometimes ranging to translucent near margins. Pelvic fins are translucent. Barbels are violet-gray dorsally, yet paler ventrally (about light gray).

== See also ==
- Clarias nieuhofii
- Clarias anfractus
- Clarias pseudoleiacanthus
- Clarias kapuasensis
- Clarias intermedius
- Clarias pseudonieuhofii
- Clarias batrachus
