= Clarias planiceps =

Conservation status
- Least Concern (IUCN 3.1)

Scientific classification
- Kingdom: Animalia
- Phylum: Chordata
- Class: Actinopterygii
- Order: Siluriformes
- Family: Clariidae
- Genus: Clarias
- Species: C. planiceps

Binomial name
- Clarias planiceps H. H. Ng, 1999
- Clarias planiceps (Borneo)

Species of fish

Clarias planiceps is a species of clariid catfish from Borneo. It is known from tributaries all over Sarawak, and possibly up to Kapuas Hulu Regency.

== Habitat & distribution ==
It can be found in slower parts of relatively fast-flowing streams with mud or sand as substrate. The holotype has been described from Belakin, with paratypes found all over Sarawak's first, second, and third division

== Characteristics ==
Collected in 1994, the holotype was noted to be of 106.5 mm in length (10.65 cm) from skull to caudal fin, with 97 corresponding paratypes ranging from 46.9 to 297.3 mm (4.7–29.73 cm), therefore possibly including juveniles. The diagnosis of this species are defined by the following characters:

- a flattened head
- presence of relatively large and distinct serrations on the front edge of the pectoral spine (core bone of the pectoral fin)
- a light plum body with small and faint white spots

Other noticeable features also include:

- the possession of a short, cylindrical body
- a vomerine toothplate slightly longer and narrower than premaxillary toothplate
- a lateral line on the center of the body, beginning just after the gill flaps and ending just before the caudal fin

Preserved specimens have been noted to be of darker purplish-brown, with the common paler underside. A row of faint and small white spots also runs along the body below the lateral line, with another 10-14 transverse rows extending towards the upper part of the body. Dorsal and anal fins are of body color, with pelvic and pectoral fins opaque white, somewhat translucent.

== See also ==
- Clarias nieuhofii
- Clarias anfractus
- Clarias pseudoleiacanthus
- Clarias kapuasensis
- Clarias intermedius
- Clarias pseudonieuhofii
- Clarias batrachus
