= Clarias anfractus =

Conservation status
- Least Concern (IUCN 3.1)

Scientific classification
- Kingdom: Animalia
- Phylum: Chordata
- Class: Actinopterygii
- Order: Siluriformes
- Family: Clariidae
- Genus: Clarias
- Species: C. anfractus

Binomial name
- Clarias anfractus H. H. Ng, 1999
- Clarias anfractus (Borneo)

Species of catfish

Clarias anfractus is a species of clariid catfish from Borneo. It is known from the Segama and Kalabakan drainages in Sabah, Northeastern Borneo.

== Habitat & distribution ==
According to type specimens collected from Sabah, it can be found in slow pools of forested fast-flowing streams with mud and soil substrates containing substantial amounts of leaf debris. The fish were found living in holes in the substrate. It has also supposedly been observed in Long Te Malinau Regency, North Kalimantan.

== Characteristics ==
Collected in 1999, the holotype for this specimen was noted to be 176.4 mm long (17.64 cm) from the edge of the skull to the caudal fin, with the 5 recorded paratypes ranging from 140.4 to 204.2 mm (14–20.4 cm). The diagnosis of this species includes the following characters:

- a pectoral spine (pectoral fin) with irregular outline (yet not serrated)
- a pear-shaped or plump radish-shaped genital papilla in males with the genital opening exposed at the anterior tip, as opposed to other species with slender or more plumped genital papila
- possessing relatively large white spots on the sides of the body, in contrast to other common species

Other notable traits also include:

- small, subcutaneous eyes
- sole shaped anterior fontanelle
- boasting an oval occipital fontanelle, narrower in width than the anterior fontanelle

Preserved specimens are known to be gray, with paler undersides. Dorsal, caudal and anal fins are also of body color, with pelvic and pectoral fins being opaque white to translucent. Big white or yellow spots are also common in other Asian forest Clarias species. The specimens were kept in a 10% formalin solution.

== See also ==
- Clarias nieuhofii
- Clarias pseudoleiacanthus
- Clarias kapuasensis
- Clarias intermedius
- Clarias pseudoleiacanthus
- Clarias batrachus
