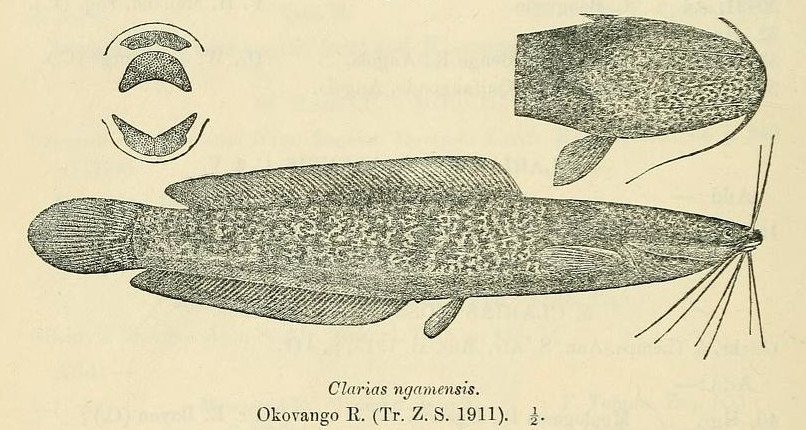

Conservation status
- Least Concern (IUCN 3.1)

Scientific classification
- Kingdom: Animalia
- Phylum: Chordata
- Class: Actinopterygii
- Order: Siluriformes
- Family: Clariidae
- Genus: Clarias
- Species: C. ngamensis

Binomial name
- Clarias ngamensis Castelnau, 1861

Synonyms
- Clarias melandi Boulenger, 1905; Clarias mellandi Boulenger, 1905; Clarias nagamensis Castelnau, 1861; Clarias prentissgrayi (Fowler, 1930); Dinopterus jallae Gilchrist & Thompson, 1917; Dinopterus pentissgrayi (Fowler, 1930); Dinotopteroides prentissgrayi Fowler, 1930; Dinotopterus jallae Gilchrist & Thompson, 1917

= Clarias ngamensis =

Species of fish

Clarias ngamensis, known as the blunt-toothed African catfish, is a species of freshwater fish in the family Clariidae, the airbreathing catfishes. First described by François-Louis Laporte, comte de Castelnau in 1861, the fish is found in swamps and floodplains in much of southern Africa. It reaches a maximum size of 73 centimetres (29 in) in total length and 4.0 kilograms (8.8 lb). The fish can breathe air and survive out of water for extended periods. Its diet includes molluscs, insects, and crabs. This species is fished and farmed for human consumption.

== Taxonomy ==
Clarias ngamensis is one of 62 species in the genus Clarias, members of which are found in Africa and Asia. A 1983 study placed C. ngamensis and C. lamottei into the subgenus Dinotopteroides, differentiating them from other Clarias species by the existence of a small adipose fin that is not always easily seen, but detectable by the presence of neural spines supporting the fin.

C. ngamensis was first described by François-Louis Laporte, comte de Castelnau in 1861 from Lake Ngami in Botswana. The species holotype (original type specimen), measuring 250 millimetres (9.8 in), was collected from Sesheke, Zambia, in 1916. The specimen is housed at the South African Institute for Aquatic Biodiversity.

This species has been referred to by synonyms including C. mellandi, C. prentissgrayi, and Dinopteroides prentissgrayi. C. mellandi was described by George Albert Boulenger from a specimen taken from Lake Bangweulu, Zambia, in 1905, based on the size and shape of the vomerine toothplate. Henry Weed Fowler described Dinopteroides prentissgrayi in 1930 from the Quanza River in Angola, citing the presence of an adipose fin as a defining trait; the species was moved to the genus Clarias in 1935. In 1983, these species were demonstrated to be synonymous with C. ngamensis. Another synonym, Dinotopterus jallae, was described by John Gilchrist and William Wardlaw Thompson in 1917 from Southern Rhodesia (modern Zimbabwe).

== Etymology ==
C. ngamensis is also known by the common names blunt-toothed African catfish, blunttooth catfish, and clarid catfish. The generic name is derived from the Greek word χλᾱρός (chlaros), meaning "lively", describing the fishes' ability to survive out of water for extended periods. The specific name comes from the name of the species's type locality, Lake Ngami.

== Distribution ==
Range of Clarias ngamensis in Africa

C. ngamensis is found in southern Africa, occurring in Angola, Botswana, the Democratic Republic of the Congo, Eswatini, Malawi, Mozambique, Namibia, South Africa, Zambia, Zimbabwe, and possibly Tanzania. It has been found in numerous river systems, including the Quanza, Cunene, Okavango, Chobe, Kafue, Luapula, Pungwe, Buzi, Save, Limpopo, and Incomati river systems. It has also been noted in the upper Zambezi, the upper Lualaba, the lower Polgola, the lower Lundi, and the lower Shire river systems, as well as Lake Ngami, Lake Malawi, Lake Moero, and Lake Bangweulu. It especially prefers floodplains and swamps such as the Barotse Floodplain and Elephant Marsh. It is a demersal fish (living near the bottom of the water) and is tolerant of brackish water.

== Description ==
The fish reaches up to 73 cm (29 in) in total length, and up to 4.0 kg (8.8 lb). The dorsal fin has 56–62 soft rays; its anal fin has 50–58 soft rays. Neither fin has spines. The adipose fin is short, at 5.9–12.5% of the fish's length. Each pectoral fin has a robust, slightly curved spine. The vomerine tooth plate is rather long, at 5.9–14.4% of the length of the head, and is egg-shaped with blunt teeth. The skull has two fontanelles – one toward the front of the skull, which is long and narrow, and one toward the back, which is small and oval-shaped. There are 56–60 vertebrae in the spinal column. The fish has an elongated body shape. It possesses four pairs of barbels.

Males of the species have black testes, whereas the testes of its congener (other member of its genus) C. gariepinus, or the African sharptooth catfish, are white. A study found increased connective tissue and melano-macrophage centres (groups of pigment-bearing cells) in the testes of C. ngamensis.

== Biology and ecology ==
This species feeds on molluscs (especially snails), fishes, shrimps, insects, crabs, and grain. It is able to crush the shells of prey such as mussels with its toothplate before consuming them. An analysis of the contents of C. ngamensis stomachs in the Shire River drainage found dragonfly nymphs and chironomid larvae to be the most important part of the fish's diet. Though sometimes said to occupy the top of the trophic chain, the fish is preyed upon by the shoebill, a stork-like bird.

Like other members of its family, C. ngamensis possesses a suprabranchial organ that allows the fish to breathe air. The fish prefers muddy substrates with vegetation. Its lifespan is 5–6 years. Males of the species grow slightly faster than females.

The fish's range is sympatric, or overlapping, with C. gariepinus. The two species have similar breeding habits and diets and have been observed pack hunting together. In the Okavango Delta of Botswana, the two catfishes hunt mormyrid fishes together, building energy reserves in the months before spawning season. The two species are also able to hybridise.

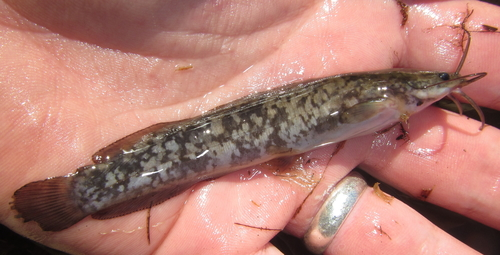
A young Clarias ngamensis in Botswana

C. ngamensis migrates to shallow flooded channels during the summer rainy season to spawn, with peak breeding season in December. During reproduction, the female scatters eggs into the substrate, where they are fertilized by the male. As nonguarders, the species does not exhibit parental care. The body length of C. ngamensis is approximately 25 cm (9.8 in) when the fish reaches sexual maturity, usually at two years of age. The beginning of the fish's breeding age is closely tied to the beginning of the rainy season, and it appears that an unusually early start to the rainy season causes the fish to reach sexual maturity earlier.

Little research has been conducted into parasites associated with C. ngamensis. A 2024 study in the Democratic Republic of the Congo found five new species of Quadriacanthus parasites (flatworms of the family Ancylodiscoididae) on the gills of C. ngamensis, as well as two additional Quadriacanthus species that were previously known to parasitise C. gariepinus.

== Conservation and use ==
C. ngamensis is assessed as a least concern species on the IUCN Red List due to its extensive range and lack of serious identified threats to its population. Its range includes multiple protected areas, and it is common in several localities. The species is both fished and farmed for food. In the Shire River, 2,400 to 2,800 tons of the species are fished annually, comprising about 20% of the fishery of that river. It has been found that C. ngamensis grows significantly slower than the similar C. gariepinus in fish farm environments, and therefore C. gariepinus is preferred for aquaculture.
