= Clarias intermedius =

- Illustration with possible coloration based on Clarias intermedius sp. nov., holotype and description

Conservation status
- Near Threatened (IUCN 3.1)

Scientific classification
- Kingdom: Animalia
- Phylum: Chordata
- Class: Actinopterygii
- Order: Siluriformes
- Family: Clariidae
- Genus: Clarias
- Species: C. intermedius

Binomial name
- Clarias intermedius Sudarto, Teugels & Pouyaud, 2001
- Clarias intermedius (Borneo)

Species of catfish

Clarias intermedius is a species of clariid catfish from Indonesian Borneo. It has been described from Central Kalimantan, Indonesia, between the Sampit and Barito rivers.

== Habitat and distribution ==
It is found in blackwater swampy areas just between the Barito and Sampit rivers; the holotype was collected in a market in Palangkaraya, with paratypes collected from areas such as Bukit Pinang, Kereng Bengkirai, Bereng Bengkel, and Bangkal, all located surrounding Palangkaraya in Central Kalimantan Province.

== Characteristics ==
Described as of 2001, the holotype for this specimen was noted to be 214 mm (8.4 in) long from skull to caudal fin, with the 18 paratypes recorded to range from 135 to 310 mm (5.3 to 12.2 in), therefore possibly including juveniles. The diagnosis of this species include:

- the posterior edge of the skull being markedly rounded, situated close to the dorsal fin origin (posterior core of the dorsal fin)
- 26-46 small serrae (saw like constituents) on the frony side of the pectoral fin bone.
- 16-23 gill rakers on the first branchial arch or gill bone

Other characters have been noted to include:

- an oval headed shape when viewed from above
- having relatively small toothplates
- possessing barbels that reach the dorsal fin, with the maxillary barbel reaching the pelvic fin bone, the inner mandibular barbel reaching the tip of the pectoral spine, and the outer mandibular barbel reaching all the way to the tip of the pectoral fin.

Live coloration has been observed to vary, notably from dark brown to black on the upper and lateral sides of head and body, with dark fins. The lower part of the head and body has been noted to be of dark gray to dark brown in color.

In contrast towards C. meladerma, no black blotches were observed in the collected specimens, not even in the smallest specimens. All specimens also possess an array of irregular and discrete white spots being visible on lower side of flanks just between the upper and lower body coloration, with a diameter about 0.5 mm.

== See also ==
- Clarias nieuhofii
- Clarias kapuasensis
- Clarias pseudoleiacanthus
- Clarias pseudonieuhofii
- Clarias batrachus
