= Clarias pseudonieuhofii =

Conservation status
- Endangered (IUCN 3.1)

Scientific classification
- Kingdom: Animalia
- Phylum: Chordata
- Class: Actinopterygii
- Order: Siluriformes
- Family: Clariidae
- Genus: Clarias
- Species: C. pseudonieuhofii

Binomial name
- Clarias pseudonieuhofii Sudarto, Teugels & Pouyaud, 2004
- Clarias pseudonieuhofii (Borneo)

Species of catfish

Clarias pseudonieuhofii is a species of clariid catfish from Borneo. It has been currently described from the upper basin of the Kapuas River in West Kalimantan, in a geographic area bordering Sentarum Lake. It has been differed from C. nieuhofii by comparing the holotypes and paratypes from specimens of C. nieuhofii from Sumatra.

== Habitat and distribution ==
It can be found in bodies of water in the Kapuas Hulu Regency, including in Lake Sentarum National Park.

== Characteristics ==
Described in 2004, the holotype for this specimen was noted to be of a length of 311 mm (31.1 cm) from skull to caudal fin, with 10 paratypes recorded to range from 230 to 316 mm (23-31.6 cm). This species is distinguishable from most other Southeast Asian forest Clarias species (except C. nieuhofii) by the combination of the following characters:

- an anguilliform body with a short and narrow head
- small laterally-placed eyes.
- occipital process more or less angular and very short
- maxillary barbels reaching level of dorsal fin origin
- possessing pelvic fins as well as pectoral fins and spine relatively short compared to other Asian Clarias species
- above lateral line with 12-15 transverse rows of small white spots, sometimes difficult to observe.

Clarias pseudonieuhofii differs from C. nieuhofii by a shorter anal fin, a longer pelvic fin, and a shorter occipital process, all in somewhat slight measurements.

In living specimens, the skin has been noted to be of dark brown to black, with deeper colors on the dorsal surface of the body and the paired fins. The ventral surface is light brown. Overall, coloration is also somewhat similar to C. nieuhofii, hence the name.

== See also ==
- Clarias nieuhofii
- Clarias kapuasensis
- Clarias pseudoleiacanthus
- Clarias batrachus
