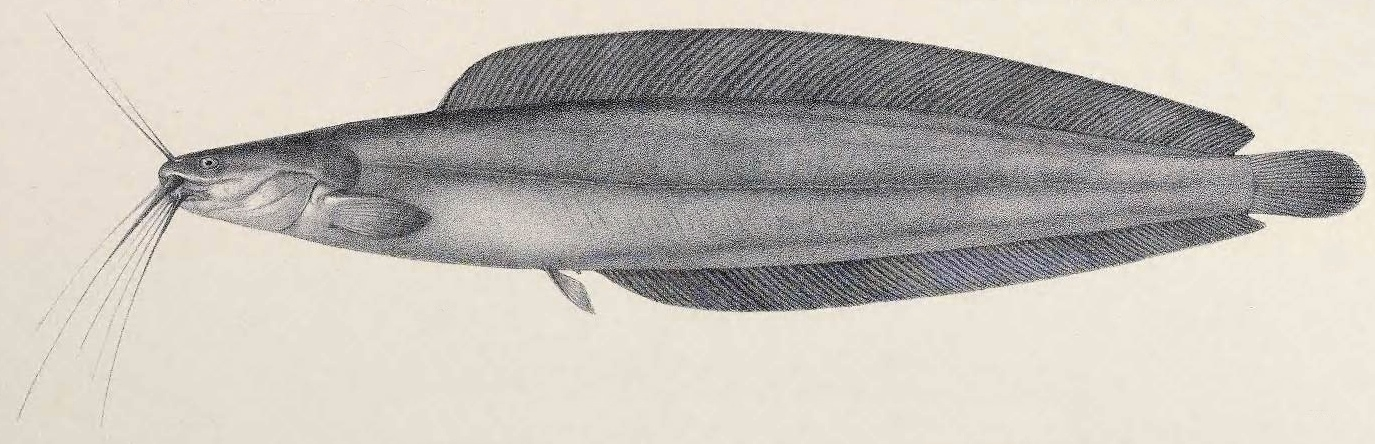

Conservation status
- Least Concern (IUCN 3.1)

Scientific classification
- Kingdom: Animalia
- Phylum: Chordata
- Class: Actinopterygii
- Order: Siluriformes
- Family: Clariidae
- Genus: Clarias
- Species: C. werneri

Binomial name
- Clarias werneri Boulenger, 1906

Synonyms
- Clarioides werneri (Boulenger, 1906)

= Werner's catfish =

Species of fish

Werner's catfish (Clarias werneri) is a species of airbreathing catfish. It is found in Burundi and Tanzania. Its natural habitats are rivers and freshwater lakes. It is threatened by habitat loss. This species reaches a length of 23.0 cm (9.1 inches) SL.

Named in honor of Dr. F. Werner, probably Austrian herpetologist Franz Werner (1867-1939), who collected type specimen.
