= Clarias lamottei =

Conservation status
- Vulnerable (IUCN 3.1)

Scientific classification
- Kingdom: Animalia
- Phylum: Chordata
- Class: Actinopterygii
- Order: Siluriformes
- Family: Clariidae
- Genus: Clarias
- Species: C. lamottei

Binomial name
- Clarias lamottei Daget & Planquette, 1967
- Clarias lamottei (Ivory Coast)

Supposed species of clariid

Clarias lamottei is a supposed species of clariid from the Ivory Coast. It has been doubted to be a natural intergeneric hybrid by Teugels, between Clarias gariepinus and Heterobranchus longifilis, through comparisons with three other Clarias and one other Heterobranchus species. Teugels suspects the striking morphological similarities between C. lamottei and extant aquaculture hybrids between the African sharptooth catfish and vundu, of which both have overlapping distribution. Despite this, IUCN evaluations have been made through the observation of the holotype habitat around the Nzi river.
