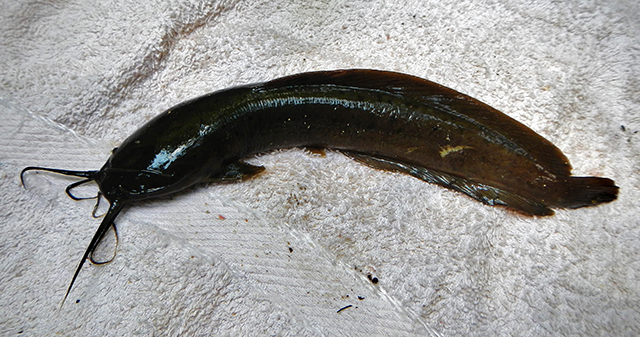

Conservation status
- Near Threatened (IUCN 3.1)

Scientific classification
- Domain: Eukaryota
- Kingdom: Animalia
- Phylum: Chordata
- Class: Actinopterygii
- Order: Siluriformes
- Family: Clariidae
- Genus: Clarias
- Species: C. brachysoma

Binomial name
- Clarias brachysoma Günther, 1864

= Clarias brachysoma =

Sri Lankan walking catfish

Species of fish

The Sri Lankan walking catfish (Clarias brachysoma) is a species of fish in the family Clariidae. It is endemic to Sri Lanka. Its natural habitats are rain forest streams and lowland rivers. It is threatened by habitat loss.

It grows to a length of 40 cm. During mating season, spawning occurs in nests among weeds in very shallow water. Then the male guards the nest and young until reaching about 1 cm in length.
