= Platyallabes tihoni =

Conservation status
- Least Concern (IUCN 3.1)

Scientific classification
- Kingdom: Animalia
- Phylum: Chordata
- Class: Actinopterygii
- Division: Teleostei
- Order: Siluriformes
- Family: Clariidae
- Genus: Platyallabes; Poll, 1977
- Species: P. tihoni

Binomial name
- Platyallabes tihoni (Poll, 1944)

Synonyms
- Gymnallabes tihoni Poll, 1944

Species of fish

Platyallabes tihoni is the only species in the genus Platyallabes of catfishes (order Siluriformes) of the family Clariidae. This species is found in the Malebo Pool. P. tihoni has a body plan that is intermediate to the generalized, fusiform (torpedo-shaped) type such as Clarias species and the anguilliform (eel-shaped) type such as Gymnallabes. This species is known to grow up to 52.8 centimetres (20.8 in) TL.
