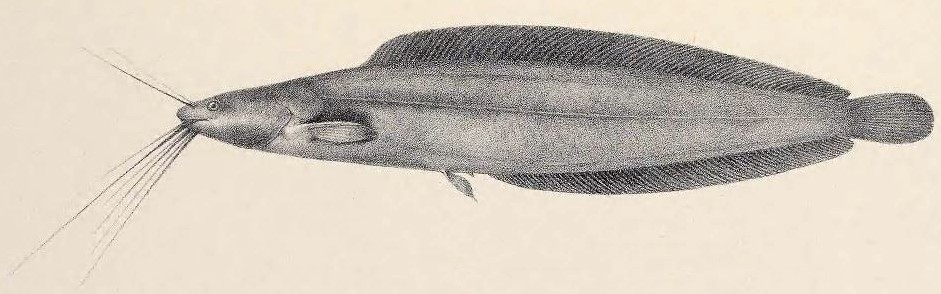

Conservation status
- Least Concern (IUCN 3.1)

Scientific classification
- Kingdom: Animalia
- Phylum: Chordata
- Class: Actinopterygii
- Order: Siluriformes
- Family: Clariidae
- Genus: Clarias
- Species: C. alluaudi

Binomial name
- Clarias alluaudi Boulenger, 1906

Synonyms
- Clarias hilgendorfi Boulenger, 1911

= Alluaud's catfish =

Allauad's catfish

Species of fish

Allauad's catfish (Clarias alluaudi) is a species of fish in the family Clariidae, the airbreathing catfishes. It is native to the lakes and rivers of East Africa.

This fish reaches 35 centimeters in length. It is often found in swampy waters amongst water lilies and papyrus, where it feeds on insects and crustaceans.
