= Clarias batu =

Conservation status
- Critically Endangered (IUCN 3.1)

Scientific classification
- Kingdom: Animalia
- Phylum: Chordata
- Class: Actinopterygii
- Order: Siluriformes
- Family: Clariidae
- Genus: Clarias
- Species: C. batu

Binomial name
- Clarias batu K. K. P. Lim & H. H. Ng, 1999
- Clarias batu is only known from Tioman Island, Malaysia

Species of fish

Clarias batu (sometimes known under the common name Tioman walking catfish) is a species of clariid catfish. It is only known from Tioman Island off the eastern coast of Peninsular Malaysia. The eel-like catfish found on this island were originally identified as the widespread species Clarias nieuhofii but comparison of a large series of specimens from Tioman with a series of C. nieuhofii from the mainland revealed consistent and distinctive differences indicating a separate species.

This is an elongated catfish up to 30.5 cm (12.0 inches) standard length. It can most readily be distinguished from C. nieuhofii by the fact that the dorsal and anal fins are clearly separated from the caudal fin whereas C. nieuhofii has all these fins confluent. Care should be taken however as specimens of C. batu have been recorded which have apparently confluent fins as a result of healing after suffering damage.
