= Clarias nigricans =

Conservation status
- Data Deficient (IUCN 3.1)

Scientific classification
- Kingdom: Animalia
- Phylum: Chordata
- Class: Actinopterygii
- Order: Siluriformes
- Family: Clariidae
- Genus: Clarias
- Species: C. nigricans

Binomial name
- Clarias nigricans H. H. Ng, 2003
- Clarias nigricans (Borneo)

Species of fish

Clarias nigricans is a species of clariid catfish. It is only known from the Mahakam River in eastern Borneo. The eel-like catfish of this region were long assumed to belong to the widespread species Clarias nieuhofii but examination of 6 specimens purchased from a fish market in Samarinda in 1999 and preserved specimens from the same location revealed consistent and distinctive differences indicating a separate species.

This is an elongated catfish up to 30.8 cm (12.1 inches) standard length. Compared to C. nieuhofii it has a "neck" distinctly narrower than the head, giving the head an egg-shaped appearance when viewed from above or below and the overall colour is much darker: purplish grey with much fainter white spots arranged in one row below the lateral line instead of two. It is a omnivore.
