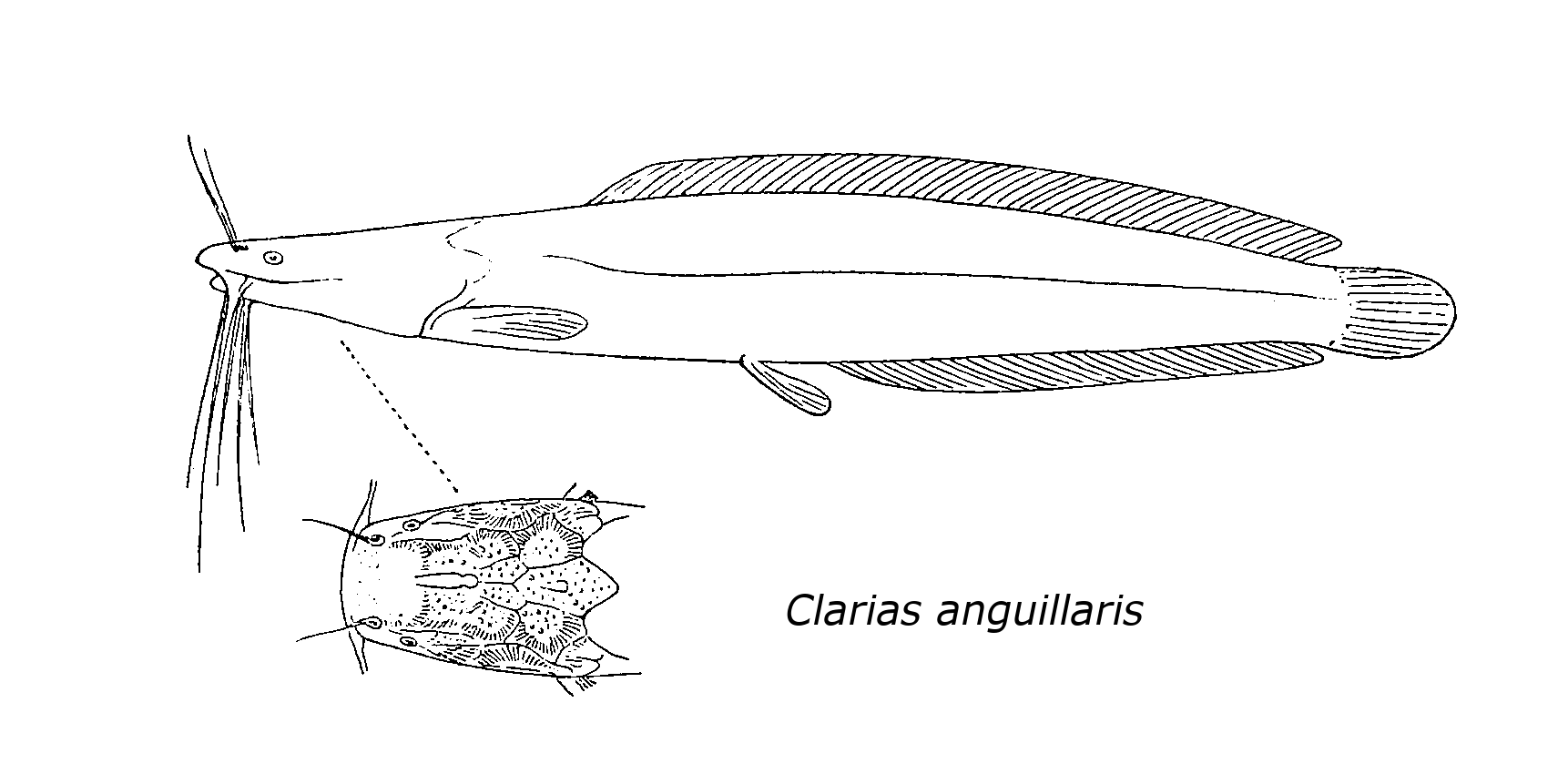

Conservation status
- Least Concern (IUCN 3.1)

Scientific classification
- Kingdom: Animalia
- Phylum: Chordata
- Class: Actinopterygii
- Order: Siluriformes
- Family: Clariidae
- Genus: Clarias
- Species: C. anguillaris

Binomial name
- Clarias anguillaris (Linnaeus, 1758)

Synonyms
- Silurus anguillaris Linnaeus, 1758; Macropteronotus charmuth Lacépède, 1803; Clarias hasselquistii Valenciennes, 1840; Clarias senegalensis Valenciennes, 1840; Clarias parvimanus Günther, 1864; Clarias budgetti Boulenger, 1900

= Clarias anguillaris =

Species of fish

Clarias anguillaris is a species of African airbreathing catfish also known as the mudfish. This species is of minor importance in commercial fisheries. It grows to a length of 100 cm (39.4 inches) TL.

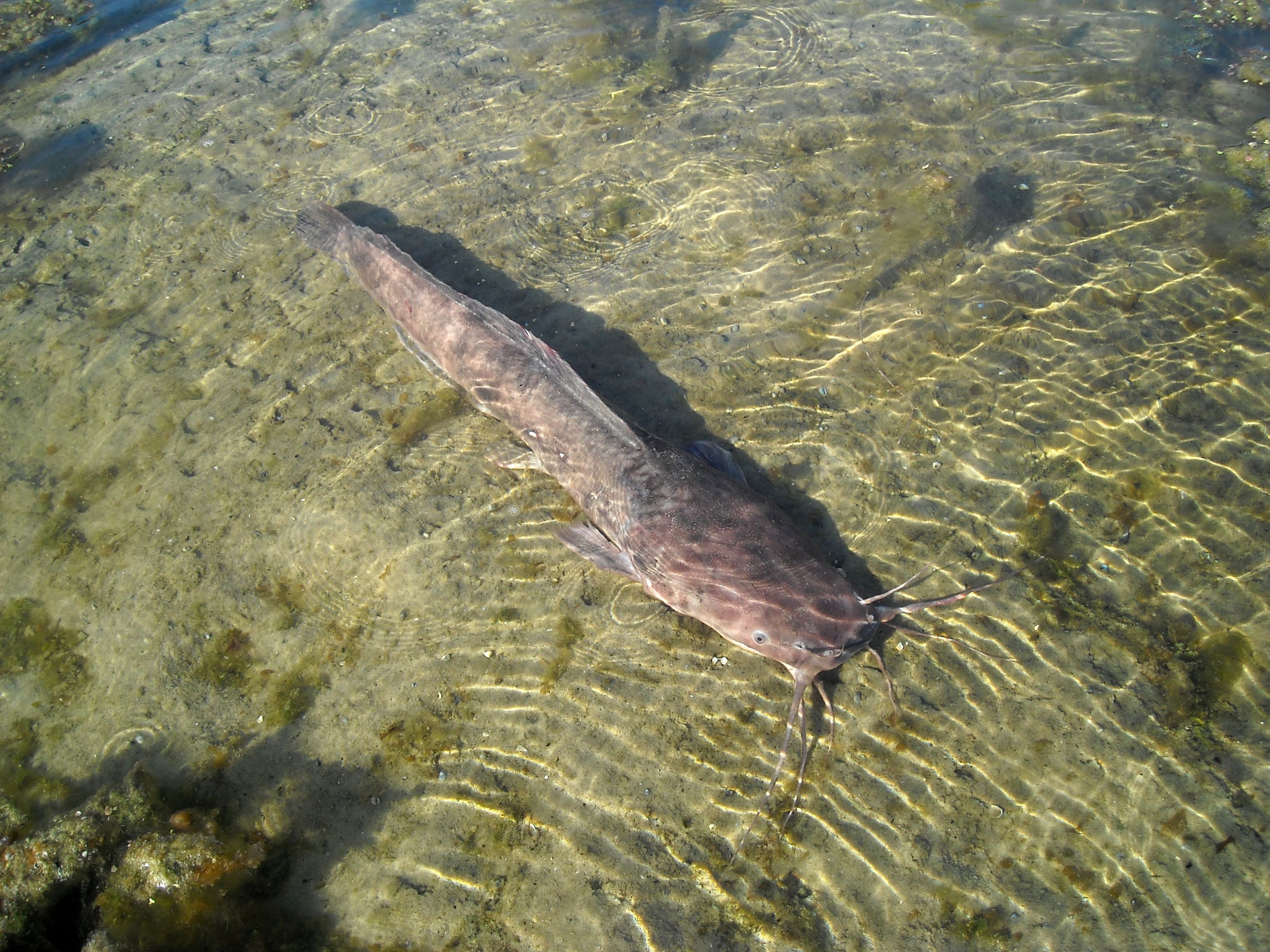
Clarias anguillaris

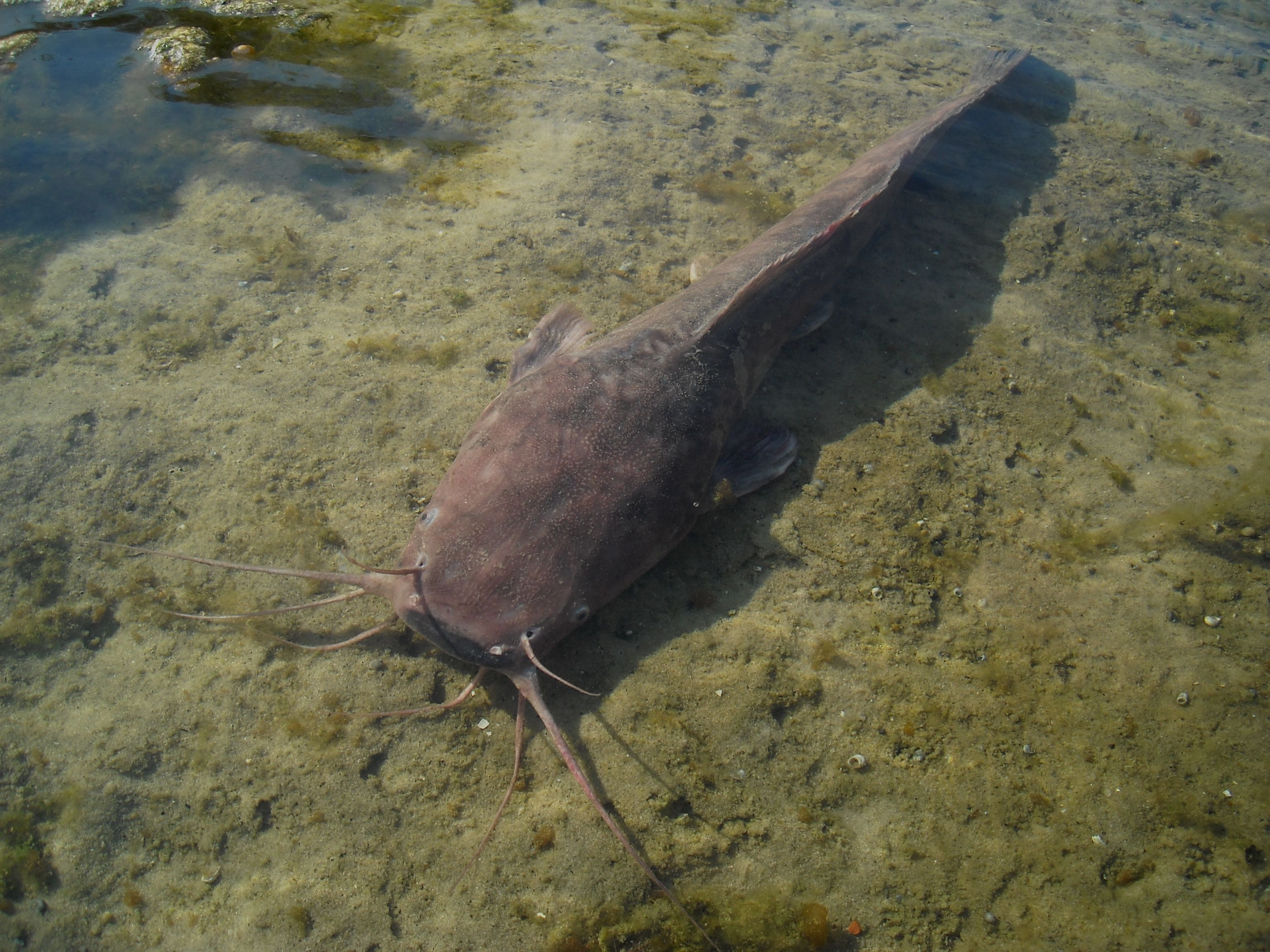

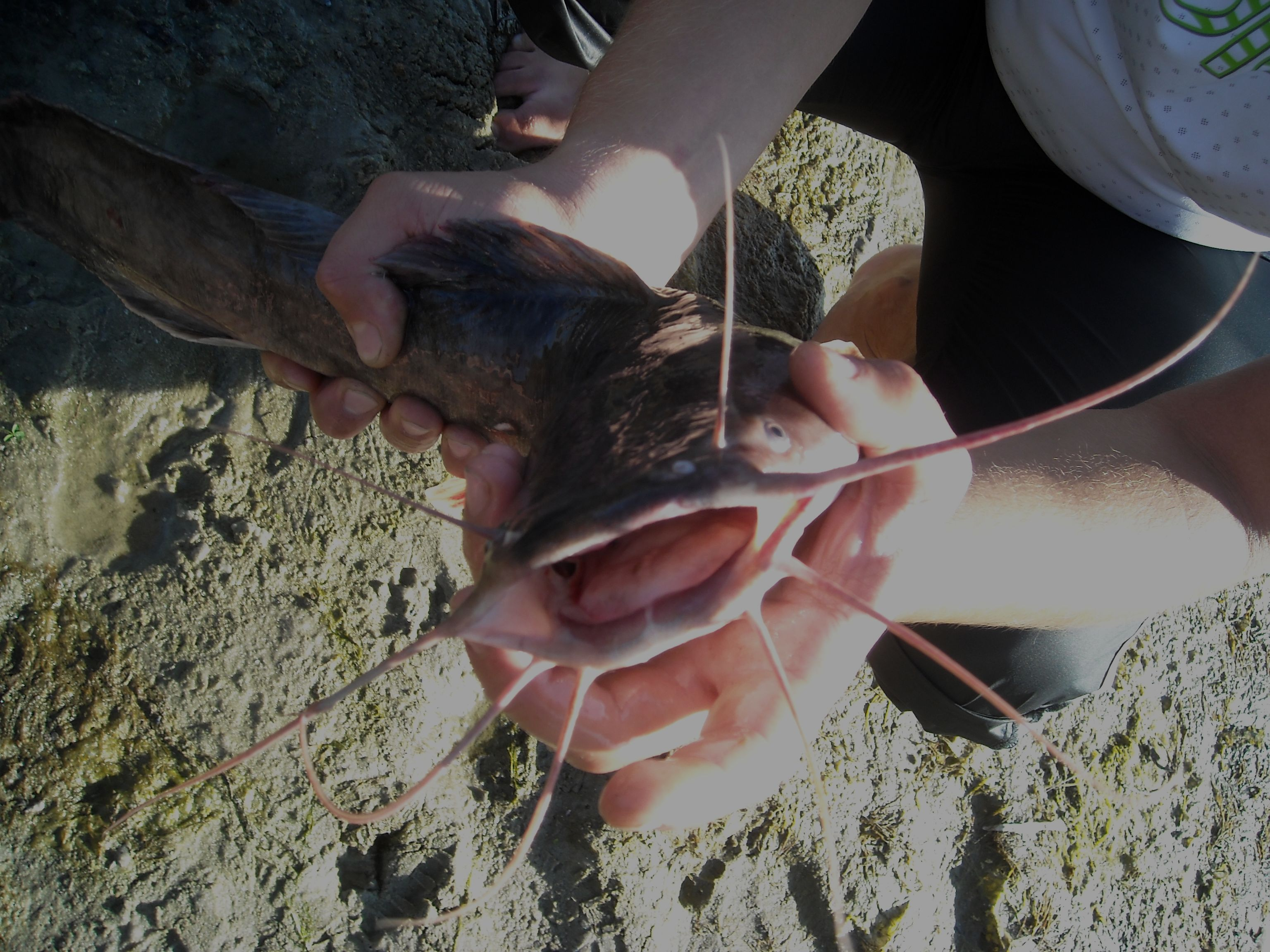
