= Clarias dayi =

Scientific classification
- Kingdom: Animalia
- Phylum: Chordata
- Class: Actinopterygii
- Order: Siluriformes
- Family: Clariidae
- Genus: Clarias
- Species: C. dayi

Binomial name
- Clarias dayi Hora, 1936

Species of catfish

Clarias dayi is a species of airbreathing catfish within the genus Clarias. It is found in bodies of water within the Wyanad Hills in Kerala, India Unlike C. dussumieri, which has a restricted distribution C. dayi is found in most bodies of water throughout the district.
