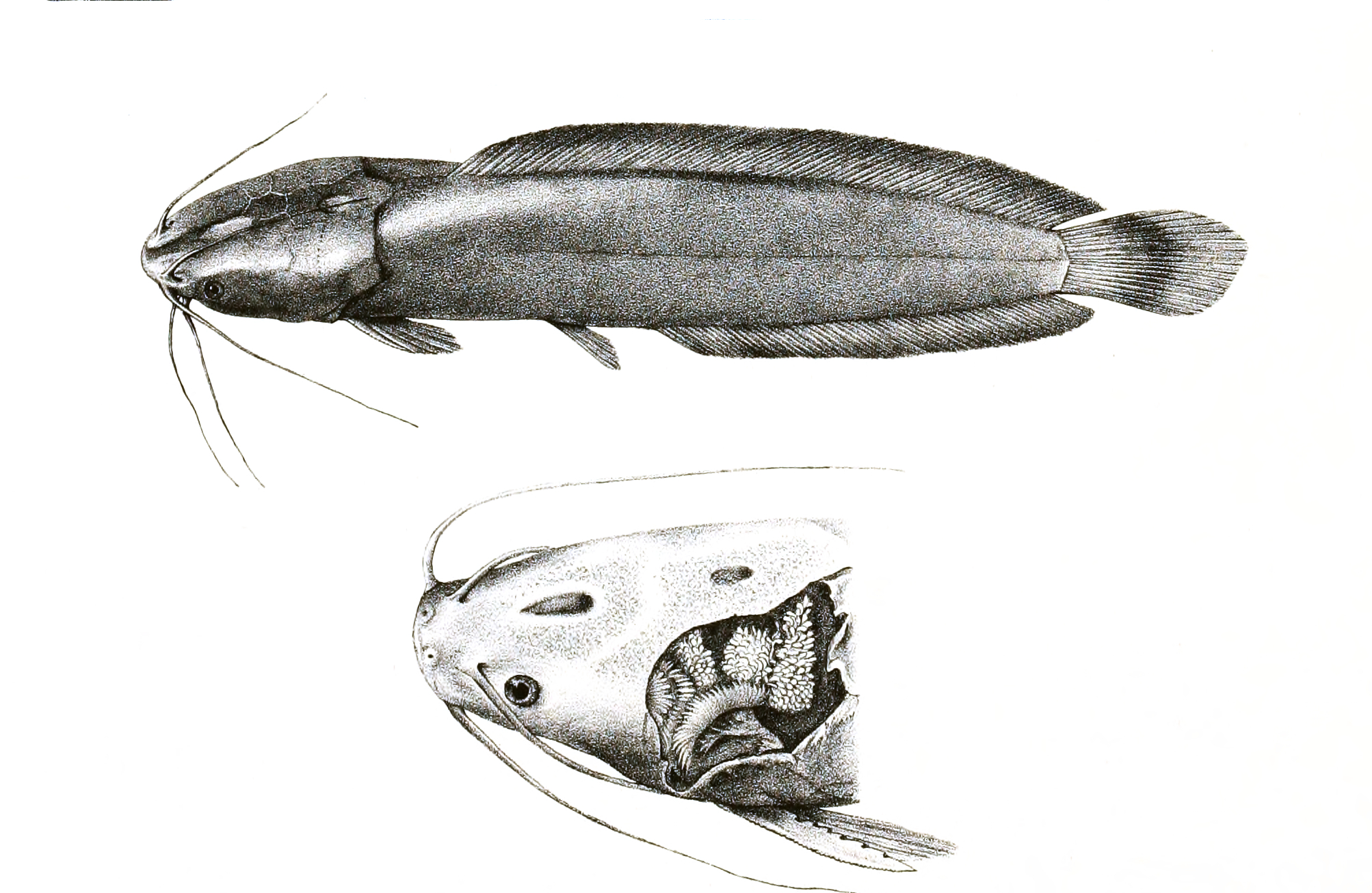
- Clarias magur Mintern

Conservation status
- Endangered (IUCN 3.1)

Scientific classification
- Kingdom: Animalia
- Phylum: Chordata
- Class: Actinopterygii
- Division: Teleostei
- Order: Siluriformes
- Family: Clariidae
- Genus: Clarias
- Species: C. magur

Binomial name
- Clarias magur (Hamilton, 1822)

Synonyms
- Macropteronotus jagur Hamilton, 1822; Macropteronotus magur Hamilton, 1822; Plotosus hamiltonii Swainson, 1839

= Clarias magur =

Species of fish

Clarias magur is a species of freshwater airbreathing catfish from India and Bangladesh. It was recognized as species distinct from Clarias batrachus in 2008.

== As food ==
Clarias magur is eaten in Bangladesh and West Bengal as magur curry (Bengali: মাগুর মাছের ঝোল), and is considered good during illness, particularly for body weakness. It is prepared in a light curry sauce with coriander powder and cinnamon powder. It reportedly is fed to children to develop body strength.

In Karnataka, C. magur is called murgodu (ಮುರ‍್ಗೋಡು). In coastal Karnataka, it is called mugudu ಮುಗುಡು, In Manipur, it is called nga-kra and is considered a delicacy.
