= Pseudotanganikallabes =

Scientific classification
- Kingdom: Animalia
- Phylum: Chordata
- Class: Actinopterygii
- Order: Siluriformes
- Family: Clariidae
- Genus: Pseudotanganikallabes; Wright, 2017
- Species: P. prognatha

Binomial name
- Pseudotanganikallabes prognatha Wright, 2017

Genus of fishes

Pseudotanganikallabes is a monotypic genus of fishes belonging to the family Clariidae. The only species is Pseudotanganikallabes prognatha.

The species is found in Tanganyika Lake.
