= Platyclarias machadoi =

Conservation status
- Data Deficient (IUCN 3.1)

Scientific classification
- Kingdom: Animalia
- Phylum: Chordata
- Class: Actinopterygii
- Order: Siluriformes
- Family: Clariidae
- Genus: Platyclarias; Poll, 1977
- Species: P. machadoi

Binomial name
- Platyclarias machadoi Poll, 1977
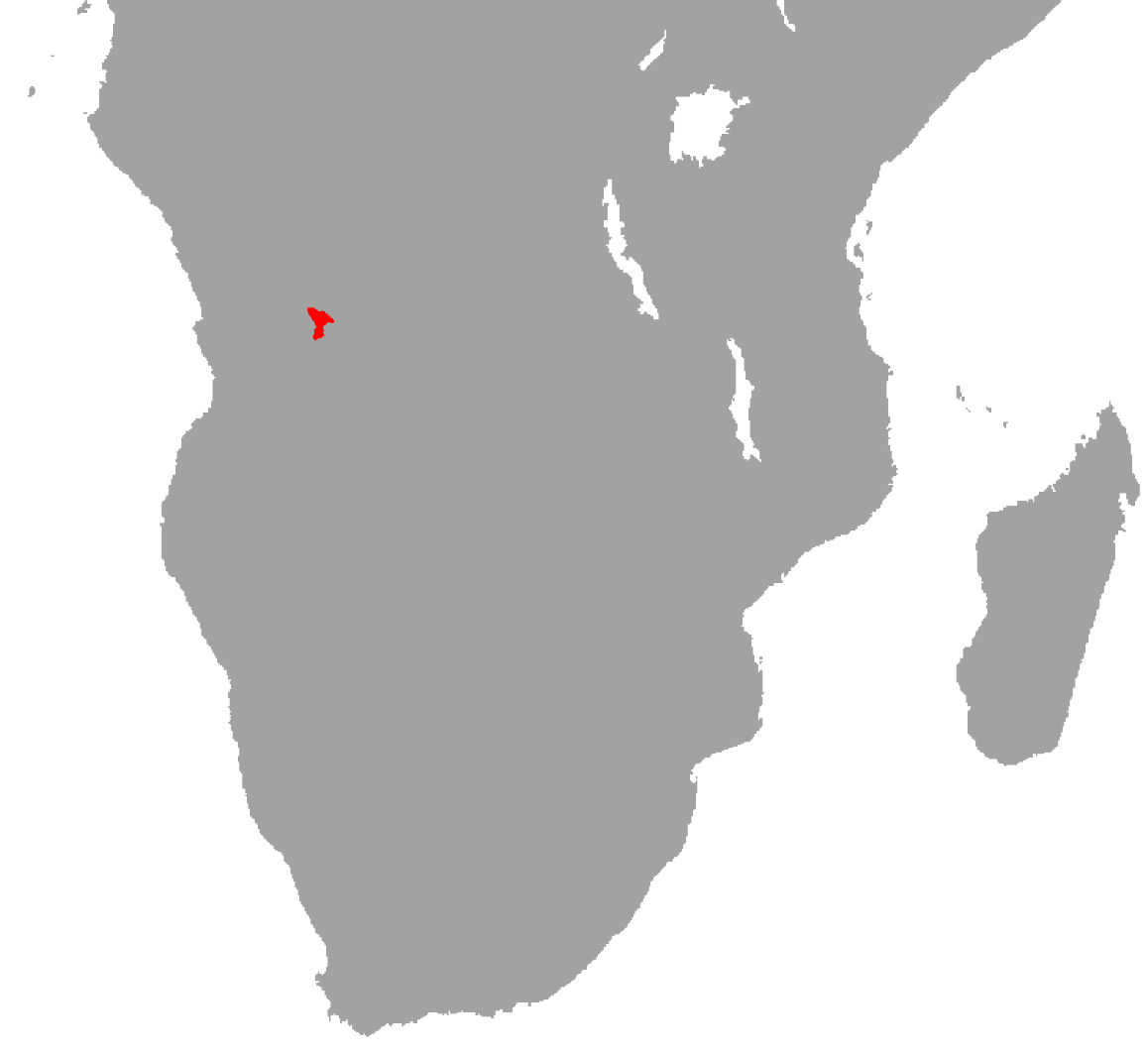

Species of fish

Platyclarias machadoi is the only species in the genus Platyclarias of catfishes (order Siluriformes) of the family Clariidae. It originates from the upper Cuango River in Angola. It reaches up to 20.1 centimetres (7.9 in) TL. P. machadoi is easily identified among the clariids due to its extremely flattened head relative to other clariids. Platyclarias was only known from a single collection of 22 specimens in 1967 until the early 2000s when two additional specimens were collected from the Kwanza River.
