= Dinotopterus =

Conservation status
- Least Concern (IUCN 3.1)

Scientific classification
- Kingdom: Animalia
- Phylum: Chordata
- Class: Actinopterygii
- Order: Siluriformes
- Family: Clariidae
- Genus: Dinotopterus; Boulenger, 1906
- Species: D. cunningtoni

Binomial name
- Dinotopterus cunningtoni Boulenger, 1906

Genus of fishes

Dinotopterus cunningtoni is a species of catfish in the family Clariidae. It is endemic to Lake Tanganyika in Burundi, the Democratic Republic of the Congo, Tanzania, and Zambia. It is of importance in local commercial fisheries. It can reach up to 1.75 m (5.7 ft) in standard length.

The genus Dinotopterus is currently considered monotypic, but formerly included several Lake Malawi species that now are placed in Bathyclarias.
