= Clarias =

Clarias Temporal range: Lower Pliocene - recent
- Forest walking catfish, Clarias leiacanthus

Scientific classification
- Kingdom: Animalia
- Phylum: Chordata
- Class: Actinopterygii
- Division: Teleostei
- Order: Siluriformes
- Family: Clariidae
- Genus: Clarias; Scopoli, 1777

Type species
- Silurus anguillaris Linnaeus, 1758

Species
- Many, see text.

Synonyms
- Chlarias Scopoli, 1777; Macropteronotus La Cepède, 1803; Clarias Cuvier, 1816; Cossyphus M’Clelland, 1844; Phagorus M’Clelland, 1844; Dinotopteroides Fowler, 1930; Prophagorus Smith, 1939; Anguilloclarias Teugels, 1982; Brevicephaloides Teugels, 1982; Clarioides Teugels, 1982; Platycephaloides Teugels, 1982

Genus of fishes

Clarias is a genus of catfishes (order Siluriformes) of the family Clariidae, the airbreathing catfishes. The name is derived from the Greek chlaros, which means lively, and is about the ability of the fish to live for a long time out of water.

== Taxonomy ==
Clarias is paraphyletic. A species of Heterobranchus (H. longifilis) clusters deeply inside the Clarias group.

== Distribution ==
They are found in inland waters throughout much of the Old World and are one of the most widespread catfish genera in the world. The genus is found in Southeast Asia and East Asia westwards through India and Asia Minor and in Africa. The diversity of these catfishes is highest in Africa. Some (notably the walking catfish) have become pest species where they were accidentally introduced, particularly in Cuba, where their introduction was intentional.

== Description ==
Clarias species are recognized by their long-based dorsal and anal fins, which give them a rather eel-like appearance. These fish have slender bodies, a flat, bony head, and a broad, terminal mouth with four pairs of barbels. Many species also have a large, accessory breathing organ composed of modified gill arches. Also, only the pectoral fins have spines.

== Species ==
There are currently 61 species recognized in this genus:

=== African species ===
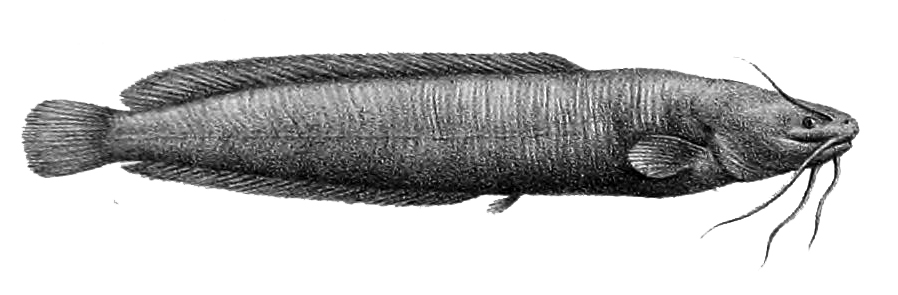
Clarias liocephalus

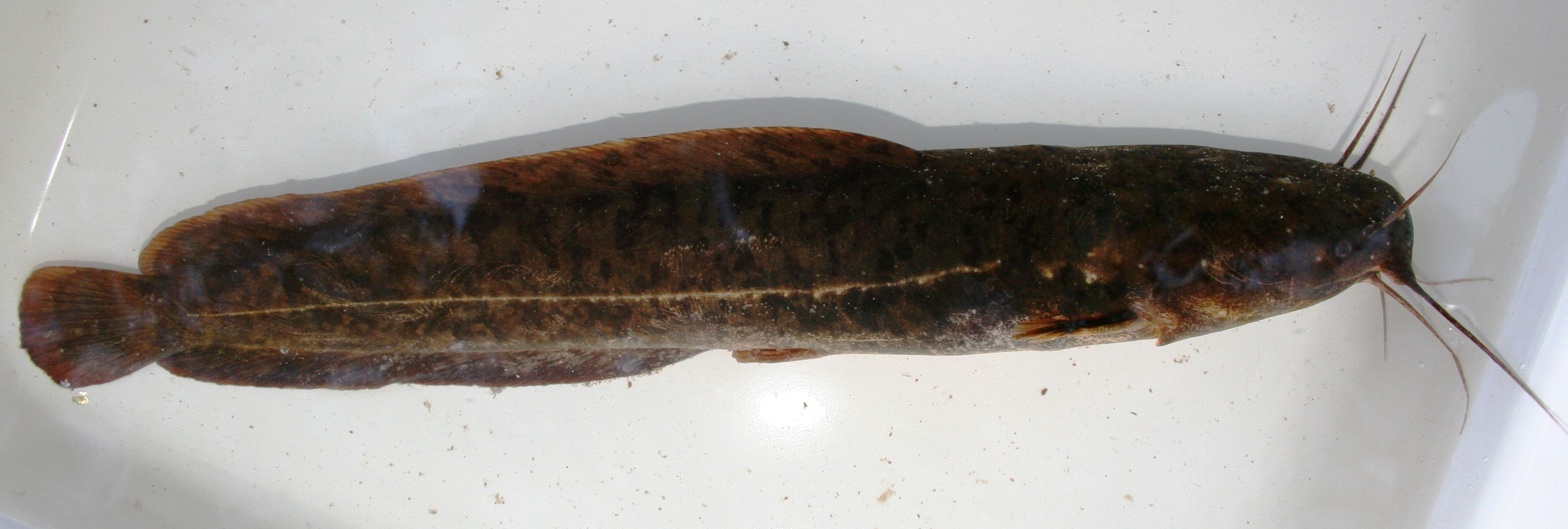
Clarias stappersii collected in Lavushi Manda National Park, Zambia by the South African Institute for Aquatic Biodiversity

- Clarias agboyiensis Sydenham, 1980
- Clarias albopunctatus Nichols & La Monte, 1953
- Clarias alluaudi Boulenger, 1906 (Alluaud's catfish)
- Clarias angolensis Steindachner, 1866
- Clarias anguillaris Linnaeus, 1758 (mudfish)
- Clarias buettikoferi Steindachner, 1894
- Clarias buthupogon Sauvage, 1879
- Clarias camerunensis Lönnberg, 1895
- Clarias cavernicola Trewavas, 1936 (cave catfish)
- Clarias dhonti Boulenger, 1920
- Clarias dumerilii Steindachner, 1866
- Clarias ebriensis Pellegrin, 1920
- Clarias engelseni Johnsen, 1926
- Clarias gabonensis Günther, 1867
- Clarias gariepinus Burchell, 1822 (African sharptooth catfish)
- Clarias hilli Fowler, 1936
- Clarias jaensis Boulenger, 1909
- Clarias laeviceps T. N. Gill, 1862
  - Clarias laeviceps dialonensis Daget, 1962
  - Clarias laeviceps laeviceps T. N. Gill, 1862
- Clarias lamottei (?) Daget & Planquette, 1967
- Clarias liocephalus Boulenger, 1898 (smoothhead catfish)
- Clarias longior Boulenger, 1907
- Clarias maclareni Trewavas, 1962
- Clarias macromystax Günther, 1864
- Clarias monsembulai Bernt and Stiassny, 2022
- Clarias ngamensis Castelnau, 1861 (blunt-toothed African catfish)
- Clarias nigromarmoratus Poll, 1967
- Clarias pachynema Boulenger, 1903
- Clarias platycephalus Boulenger, 1902
- Clarias salae Hubrecht, 1881
- Clarias stappersii Boulenger, 1915 (blotched catfish)
- Clarias submarginatus W. K. H. Peters, 1882
- Clarias theodorae M. C. W. Weber, 1897 (snake catfish)
- Clarias werneri Boulenger, 1906 (Werner's catfish)

=== Asian species ===
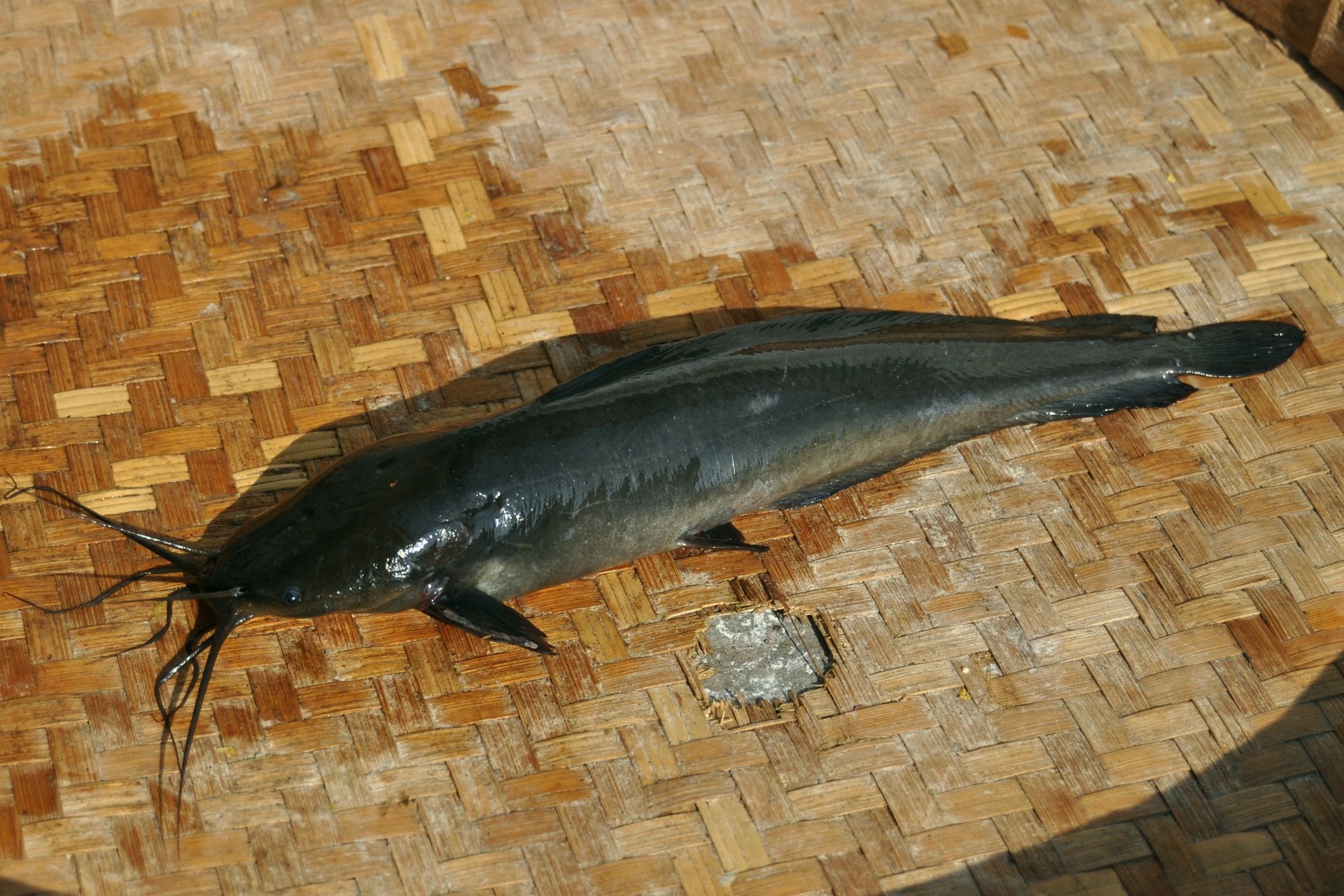
Clarias batrachus from Lumajang Regency, East Java, Indonesia

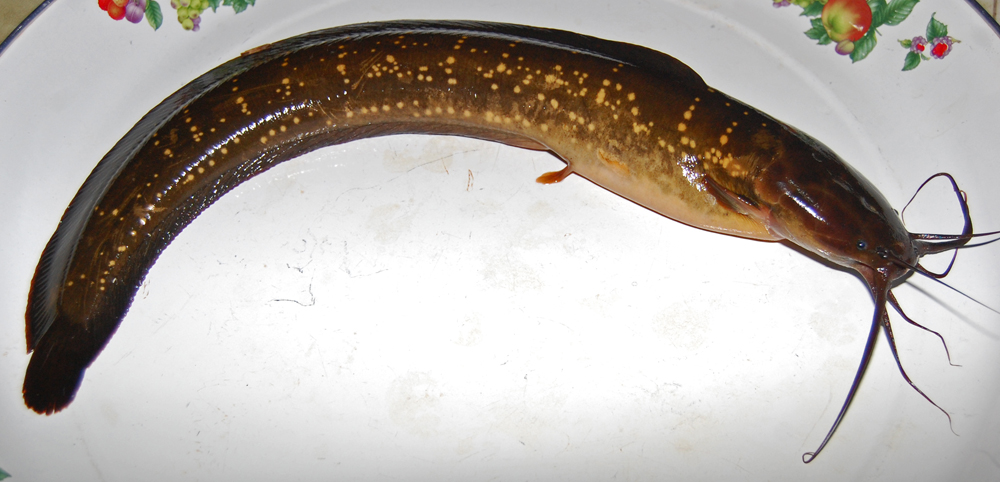
Clarias nieuhofii from East Kotawaringin, Central Kalimantan, Indonesia.

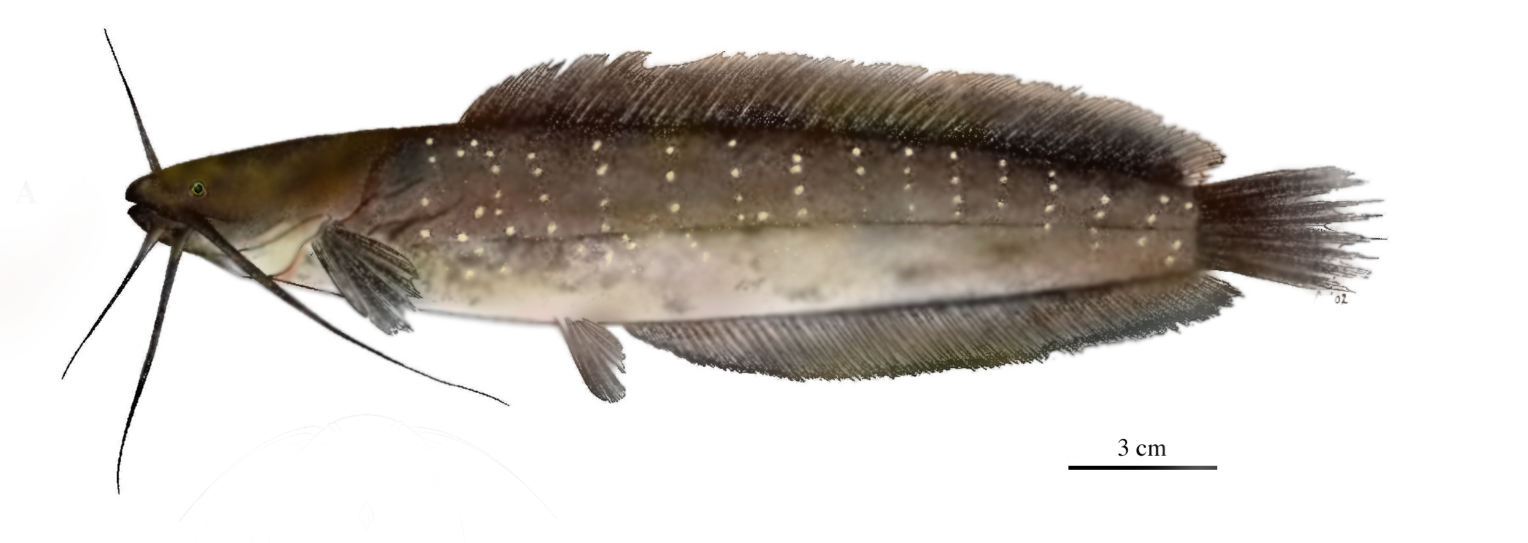
Clarias pseudoleiacanthus

- Clarias abbreviatus Valenciennes, 1840
- Clarias anfractus H. H. Ng, 1999
- Clarias batrachus Linnaeus, 1758 (Walking catfish)
- Clarias batu K. K. P. Lim & H. H. Ng, 1999
- Clarias brachysoma Günther, 1864
- Clarias dayi Hora, 1936
- Clarias dussumieri Valenciennes, 1840
- Clarias fuscus Lacépède, 1803 (Hong Kong catfish)
- Clarias gracilentus H. H. Ng, K. H. Dang & V. T. Nguyen, 2011
- Clarias insolitus H. H. Ng, 2003
- Clarias intermedius Teugels, Sudarto & Pouyaud, 2001
- Clarias kapuasensis Sudarto, Teugels & Pouyaud, 2003
- Clarias leiacanthus Bleeker, 1851
- Clarias macrocephalus Günther, 1864 (bighead catfish)
- Clarias magur F. Hamilton, 1822
- Clarias meladerma Bleeker, 1846 (blackskin catfish)
- Clarias microspilus H. H. Ng & Hadiaty, 2011
- Clarias microstomus H. H. Ng, 2001
- Clarias nebulosus Deraniyagala, 1958
- Clarias nieuhofii Valenciennes, 1840 (slender walking catfish)
- Clarias nigricans H. H. Ng, 2003
- Clarias olivaceus Fowler, 1904
- Clarias planiceps H. H. Ng, 1999
- Clarias pseudoleiacanthus Sudarto, Teugels & Pouyaud, 2003
- Clarias pseudonieuhofii Sudarto, Teugels & Pouyaud, 2004
- Clarias rennyae Low, H. H. Ng & H. H. Tan, 2022
- Clarias serniosus H. H. Ng & Kottelat, 2014
- Clarias sulcatus H. H. Ng, 2004

Fossil species

- †Clarias falconeri Lydekker, 1886, from India

== Importance to economy ==
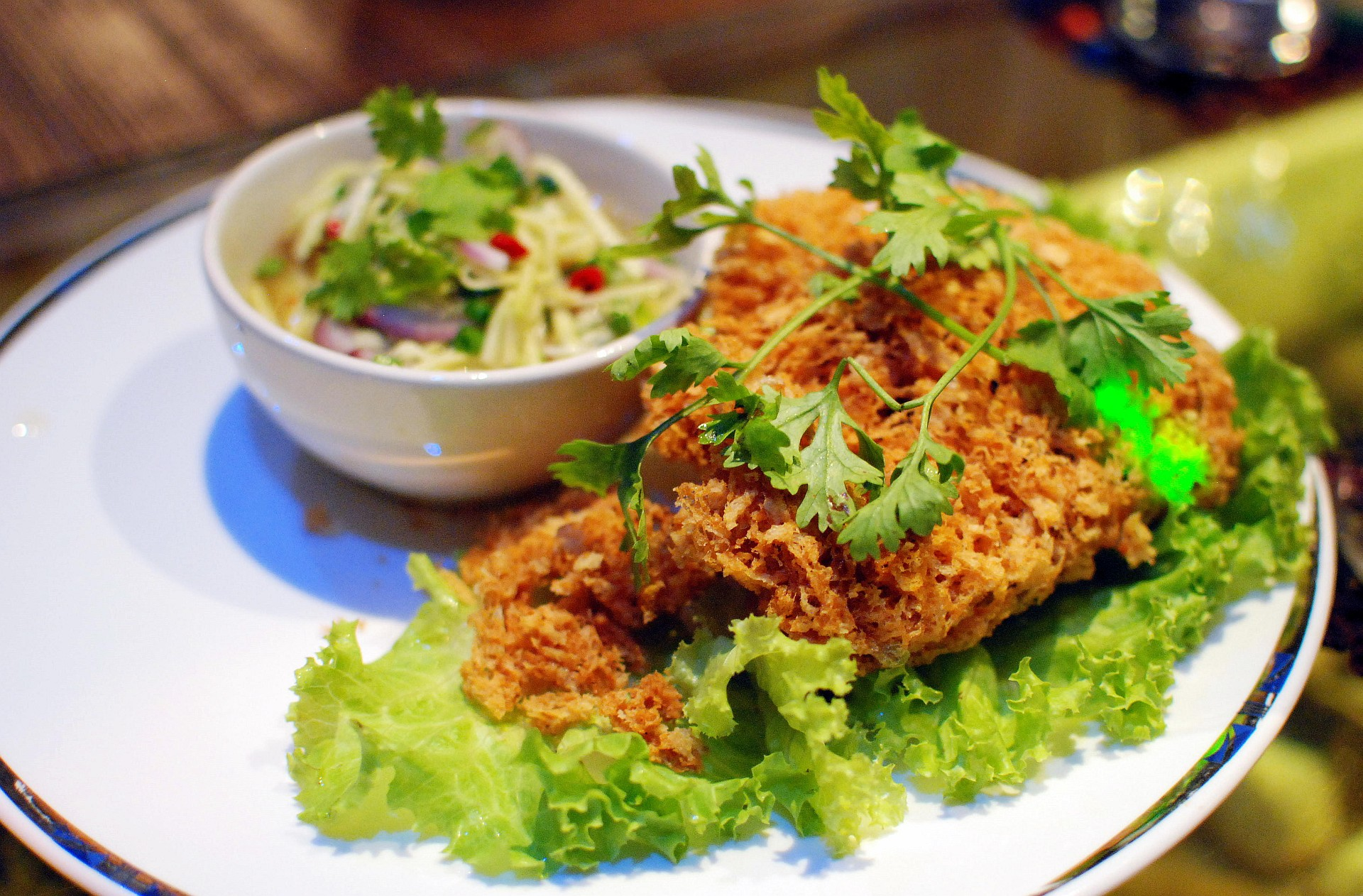
Yam pladuk fu (Thai: ยำปลาดุกฟู): shredded and deep fried Clarias (pla duk) catfish with salad

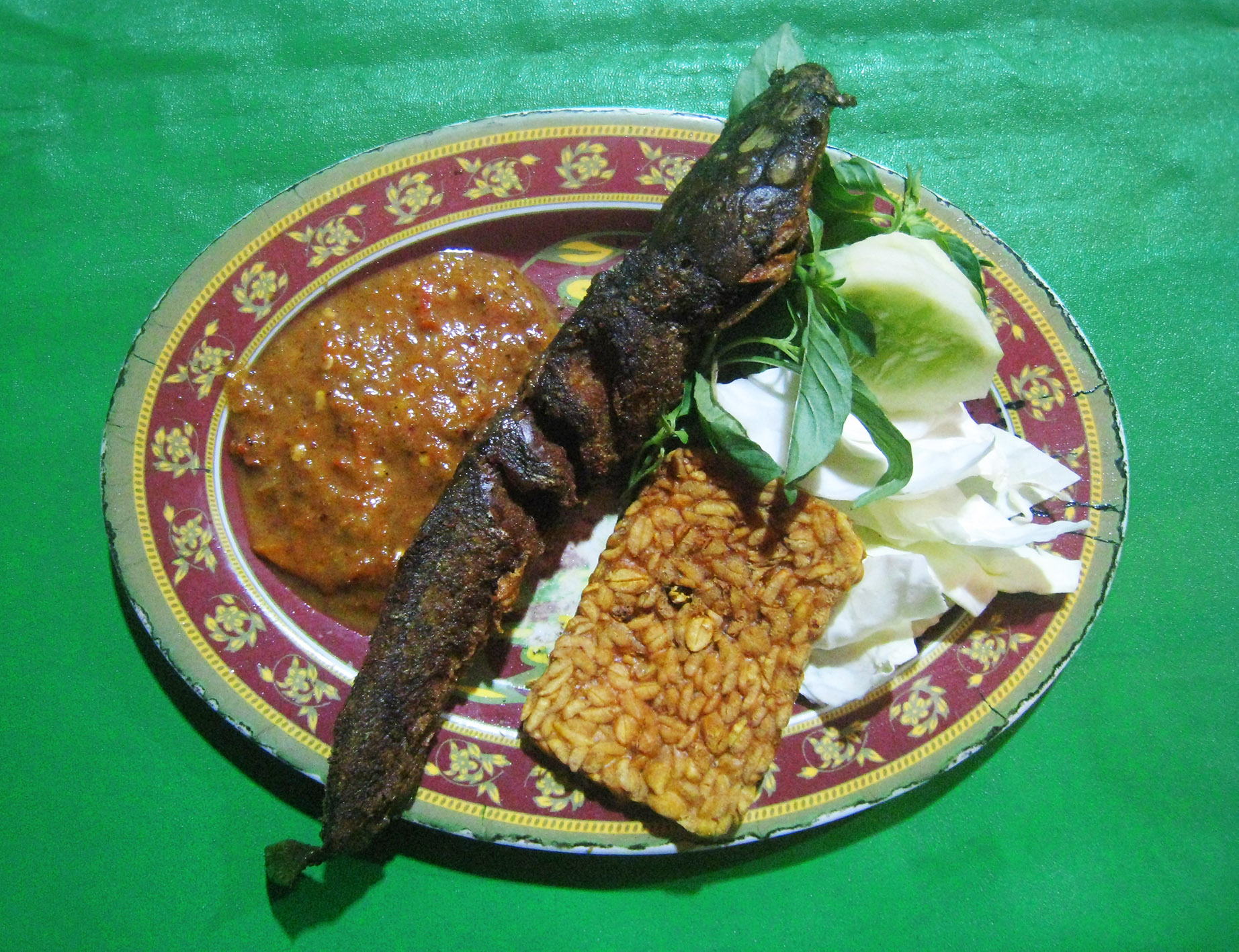
Pecel lele, an Indonesian-style deep fried Clarias (lele); usually sold as street food

Many species are of great economic importance in fisheries and fish culture.

== Invasive species ==
Clarias catfish and primarily Clarias gariepinus have been introduced to many different areas of the world, causing problems for native wildlife. The effect of the introduction of these fish varies from area to area, but as they are predatory, they often affect the local wildlife by eating other fish, birds, and amphibians. In Florida, the fish are causing problems by invading aquaculture farms and preying on the fish cultivated there. Countries where one or several Clarias species have been introduced include Indonesia, the United States, Hong Kong, China, the UK, Papua New Guinea, Guam, Taiwan, Thailand, and Cuba.
