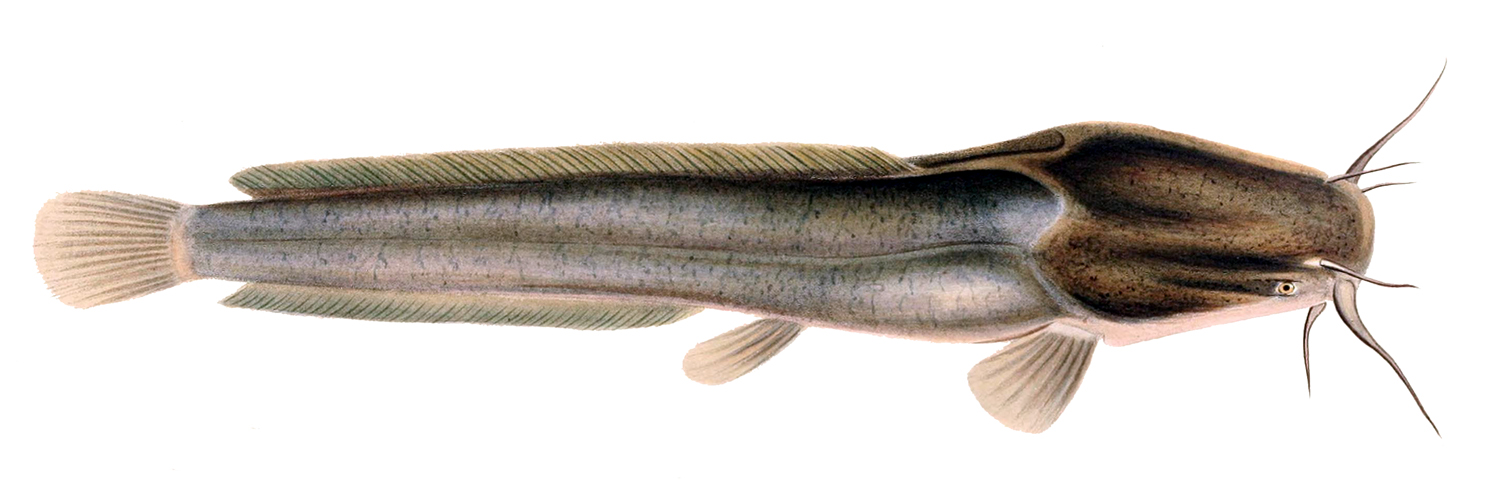

Conservation status
- Least Concern (IUCN 3.1)

Scientific classification
- Kingdom: Animalia
- Phylum: Chordata
- Class: Actinopterygii
- Division: Teleostei
- Order: Siluriformes
- Family: Clariidae
- Genus: Clarias
- Species: C. gariepinus

Binomial name
- Clarias gariepinus (Burchell, 1822)
- Extant (resident) Extant & introduced (resident) Extant & origin uncertain (resident) Possibly extant (resident) Possibly extant & introduced (resident) Possibly extant & origin uncertain (resident)

Synonyms
- List: Silurus gariepinus Burchell, 1822; Macropteronotus charmuth Lacépède, 1803; Clarias capensis Valenciennes, 1840; Clarias lazera Valenciennes, 1840; Clarias syriacus Valenciennes, 1840; Clarias mossambicus Peters, 1852; Clarias macracanthus Günther, 1864; Clarias orontis Günther, 1864; Clarias xenodon Günther, 1864; Clarias robecchii Vinciguerra, 1893; Clarias smithii Günther, 1896; Clarias microphthalmus Pfeffer, 1896; Clarias guentheri Pfeffer, 1896; Clarias longiceps Boulenger, 1899; Clarias longiceps Boulenger, 1899; Clarias moorii Boulenger, 1901; Clarias tsanensis Boulenger, 1902; Clarias vinciguerrae Boulenger, 1902; Clarias malaris Nichols & Griscom, 1917; Clarias notozygurus Lönnberg & Rendahl, 1922; Clarias depressus Myers, 1925; Clarias muelleri Pietschmann, 1939

= Clarias gariepinus =

Species of fish

Capture (blue) and aquaculture (green) production of North African catfish (Clarias gariepinus) in thousand tonnes from 1950 to 2022, as reported by the FAO

Clarias gariepinus or African sharptooth catfish is a species of catfish of the family Clariidae, the airbreathing catfishes.

== Distribution ==
They are found throughout Africa and the Middle East, and live in freshwater lakes, rivers, and swamps, as well as human-made habitats, such as oxidation ponds or even urban sewage systems.

The African sharptooth catfish was introduced all over the world in the early 1980s for aquaculture purposes, so is found in countries far outside its natural habitat, such as Cuba, Hispaniola (both the Dominican Republic and Haiti), Brazil, Vietnam, Indonesia,Taiwan, and India. In countries where native species of Clarias occur, such as Indonesia, the sharptooth catfish may be distinguished; In Indonesia, it is referred to as lele dumbo.

== Description ==
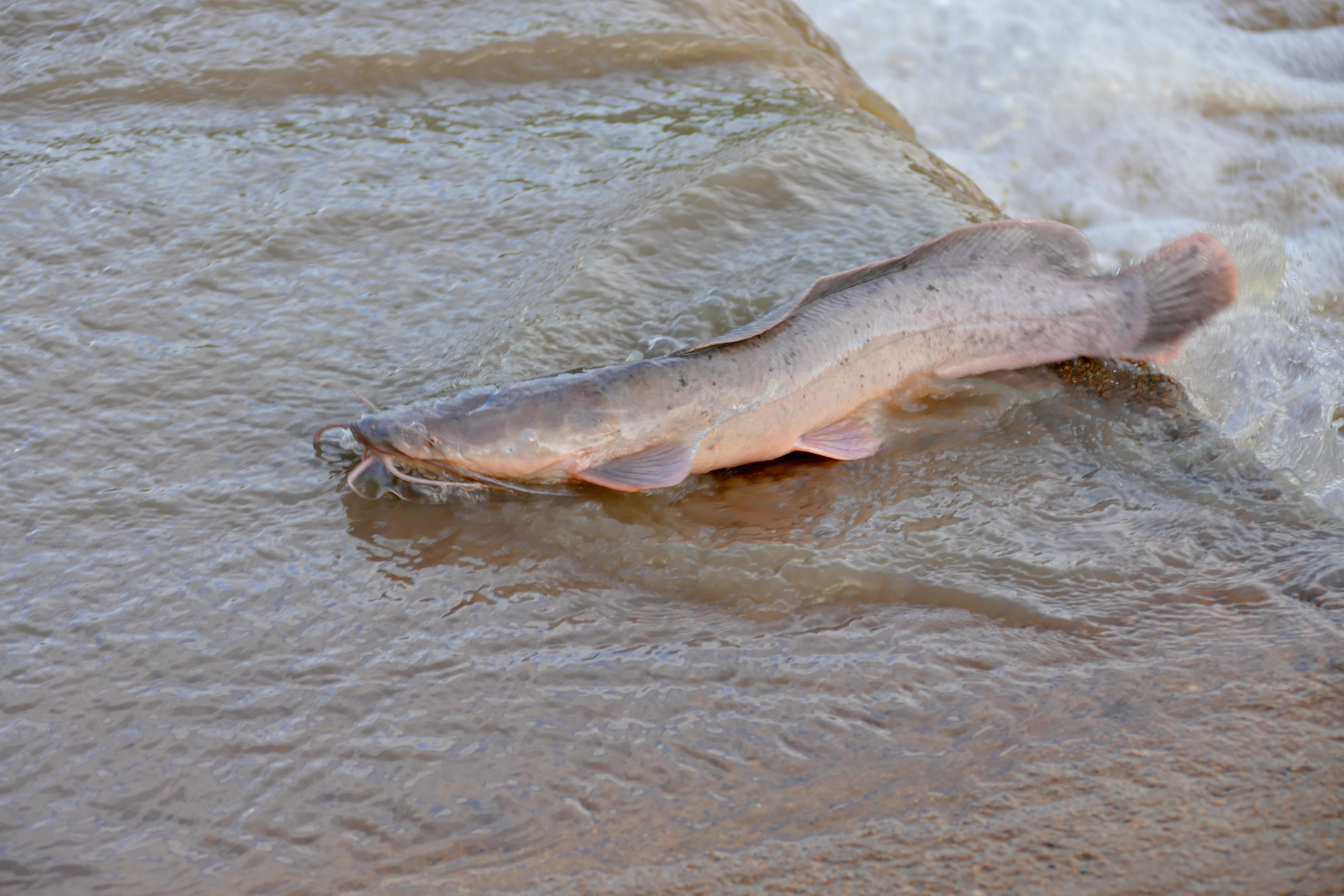
Jumping upstream in a branch of the Sabie River, Kruger N.P.

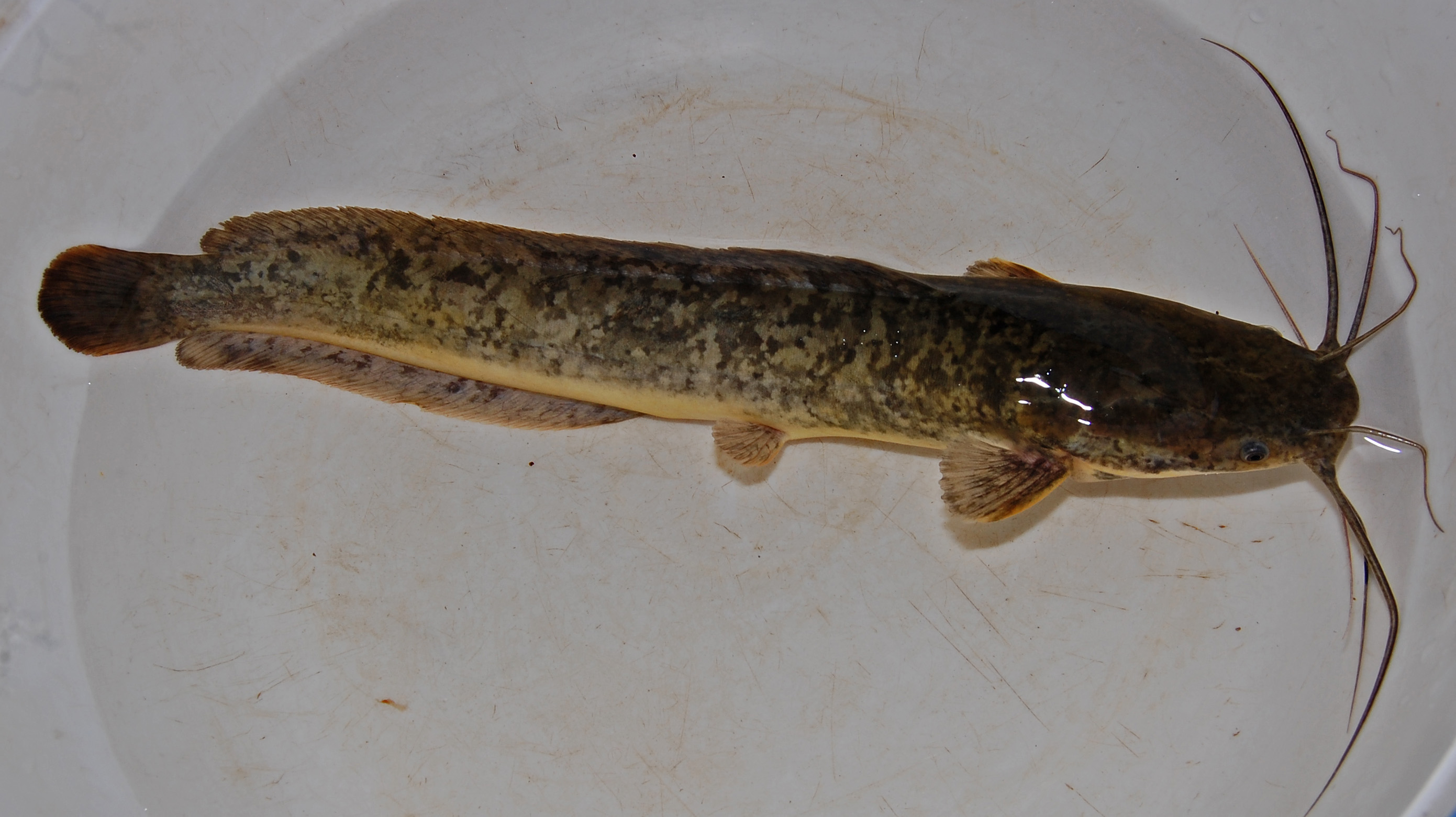
Specimen from Bogor, Indonesia (possibly cultivated)

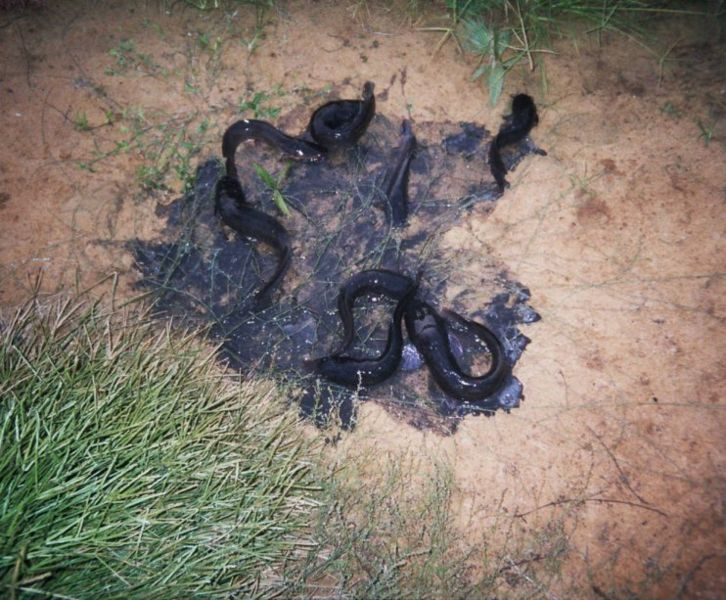
Juvenile specimens caught in the sewers of Rishon LeZion, Israel

The African sharptooth catfish is a large, eel-like fish, usually of dark gray or black coloration on the back, fading to a white belly. In Africa, this catfish has been reported as being second in size only to the vundu of the Zambesian waters, although FishBase suggests the African sharptooth catfish surpasses that species in both maximum length and weight.

C. gariepinus has an average adult length of 1–1.5 m (3 ft 3 in – 4 ft 11 in). It reaches a maximum length of 1.7 m (5 ft 7 in) TL and can weigh up to 60 kg (130 lb). These fish have slender bodies, flat bony heads, notably flatter than in the genus Silurus, and broad, terminal mouths with four pairs of barbels. They also have large accessory breathing organs composed of modified gill arches. Also, only the pectoral fins have spines.

== Habits ==
It is a nocturnal fish like many catfish. It feeds on living, as well as dead, animal matter (such as insects, plankton, snails, crabs, shrimp, other invertebrates, birds, reptiles, amphibians, small mammals, other fishes, and eggs) and plant matter such as fruit and seeds. Because of its wide mouth, it is able to swallow relatively large prey whole. It has been known to take large waterbirds such as the common moorhen. It is also able to crawl on dry ground to escape drying pools. Further, it is able to survive in shallow mud for long periods of time, between rainy seasons.

African catfish sometimes produce loud croaking sounds, not unlike the voice of the crow.

== Natural spawning ==
Spawning mostly takes place at night in the shallow, inundated areas of the rivers, lakes and streams. Courtship is preceded by highly aggressive encounters between males. Courtship and mating takes place in shallow waters between isolated pairs of males and females. The male lies in a U-shape curved around the head of the female, held for several seconds. A batch of milt and eggs is released followed by a vigorous swish of the female's tail to distribute the eggs over a wide area. The pair usually rests after mating (from seconds up to several minutes) and then resumes mating.

Parental care for ensuring the survival of the catfish offspring is absent except by the careful choice of a suitable site. Development of eggs and larvae is rapid, and the larvae are capable of swimming within 48–72 hours after fertilization.

== Rearing ==
The rearing of the African sharptooth catfish in Africa started in the early 1970s in Central and Western Africa, as it was realized to be a very suitable species for aquaculture, as:

- It grows fast and feeds on a large variety of agriculture byproducts
- It tolerates adverse water quality conditions
- It can be raised in high densities, resulting in high net yields (6–16 t/ha/year).
- In most countries, it fetches a higher price than tilapia, as it can be sold live at the market
- It matures and relatively easily reproduces in captivity.
- It tolerates difficult conditions in aquaculture

== Hybridisation ==
Clarias gariepinus could be easily crossed with Heterobranchus longifillis to get the so-called hybrid Hetero-clarias. This cross has advantages over C. gariepinus:

- Cannot reproduce (so does not spend energy on reproduction)
- Has white meat (usually preferred by customers)

A major disadvantage of the Hetero-clarias hybrid, though, is its susceptibility to stress.

Allegedly, other hybrids have been supposedly produced, such as one with C. fuscus, exported to Indonesia from Taiwan as Lele Dumbo, a much higher-yielding variety than the local C. batrachus, despite the truth of such hybridization being rather invalidable.

== Parasites and diseases ==
C. gariepinus may host several species of digeneans, in addition to other endo- and ectoparasites.
