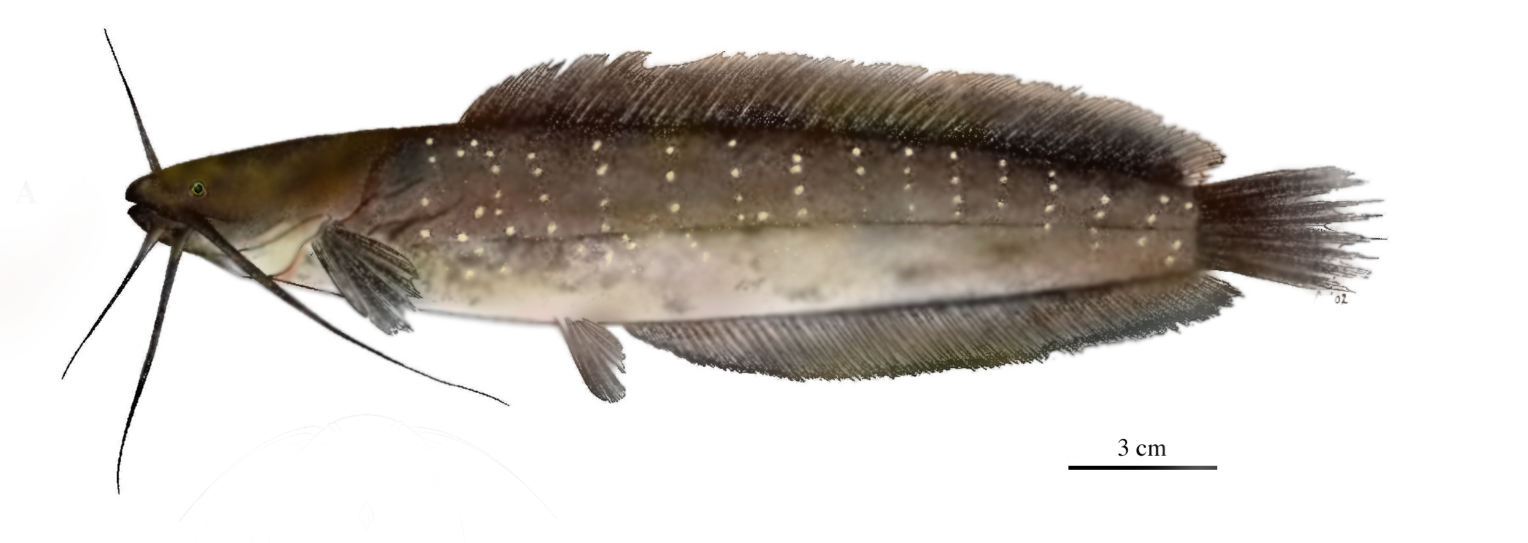
- Illustration with possible coloration based on Clarias pseudoleiacanthus holotype and description

Conservation status
- Data Deficient (IUCN 3.1)

Scientific classification
- Kingdom: Animalia
- Phylum: Chordata
- Class: Actinopterygii
- Order: Siluriformes
- Family: Clariidae
- Genus: Clarias
- Species: C. pseudoleiacanthus

Binomial name
- Clarias pseudoleiacanthus Sudarto, Teugels & Pouyaud, 2003
- Clarias pseudoleiacanthus (Borneo)

= Clarias pseudoleiacanthus =

Species of catfish

Clarias peudoleiacanthus is a species of clariid catfish from Borneo. It has been described from the southern lower parts of the River Kapuas (Western Kalimantan and coastal areas near the Barito River in southern Kalimantan, Indonesia

== Habitat & distribution ==
It has been found in swampy areas along the Bornean southwest, specifically the southern mouth of the Kapuas River and coastal swamps around the Barito River; the holotype was collected in peat swamps at Satong (near Ketapang), with paratypes collected in swampy areas just around Palangkaraya, both in the Southwest areas of Borneo, despite being rather distant.

== Characteristics ==
Described alongside C. kapuasensis in 2003, it has been recorded to reach up to 25 cm (9.6 inches). The holotype for this specimen was about 220 mm SL (8.7 inches) from skull to caudal fin, with the 15 paratypes recorded to be ranging from around 160 to 245 mm (6.2-9.6 inches). The characters that contributed to its diagnosis are:

- having a somewhat short occipital process (the backmost skull bone)
- a short distance between the occipital process and the anterior tip of the dorsal fin
- possessing a smooth front edge of the pectoral spine, without serrae
- containing 17-19 gill rakers on the first branchial arch
- a shorter anal fin compared to C. nieuhofii

Other characters also include:

- possessing a relatively small toothplate
- a short, broad snout, rounded from dorsal/upper view
- very small eyes placed laterally, facing dorsally.

Live coloration has been noted to be relatively black on dorsal and lateral sides of head and body, fading to a somewhat paler colour nearing the lower part of the body, with black fins and snout. Regular small white or yellow spots are also visible, distributed in both the upper and lower side of the body flanks. On the margins of the lower body section these spots are smaller and yet more numerous than spots near the lateral borders.

== See also ==
- Clarias nieuhofii
- Clarias kapuasensis
- Clarias batrachus
