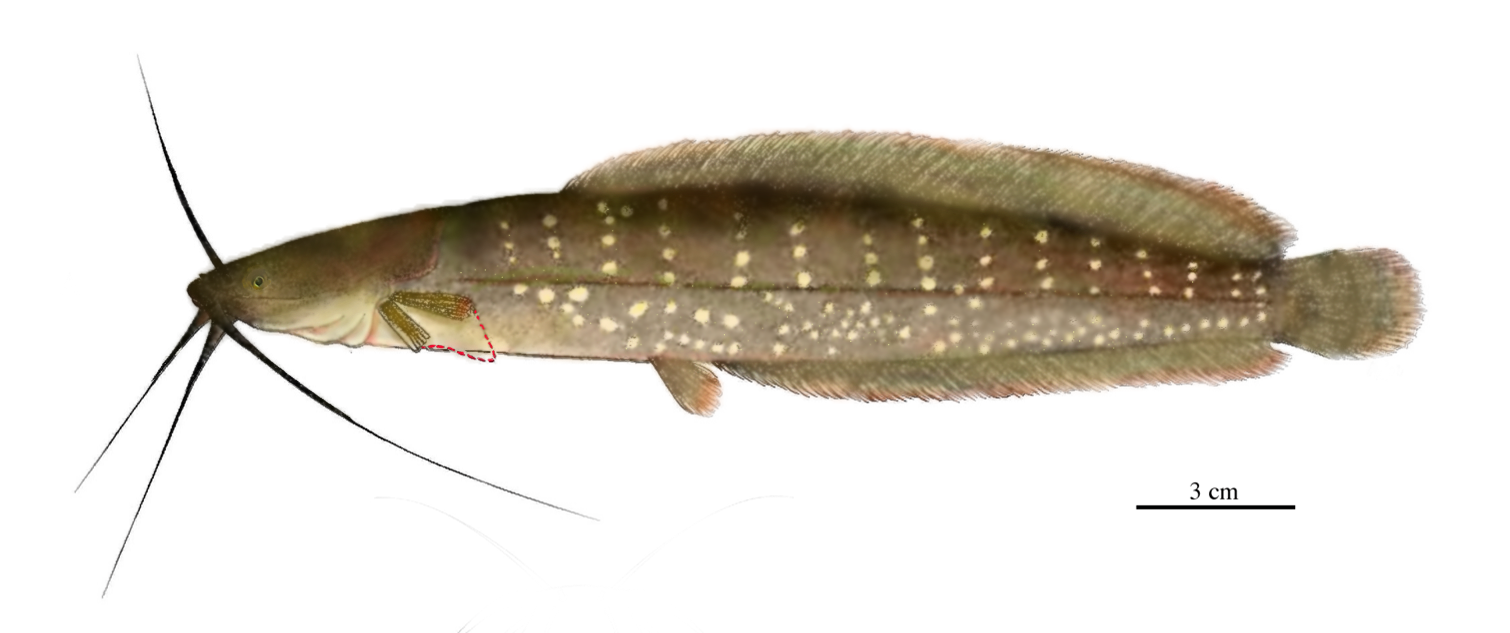
- Illustration with possible coloration based on Clarias kapuasensis sp. nov., holotype and description

Conservation status
- Endangered (IUCN 3.1)

Scientific classification
- Kingdom: Animalia
- Phylum: Chordata
- Class: Actinopterygii
- Order: Siluriformes
- Family: Clariidae
- Genus: Clarias
- Species: C. kapuasensis

Binomial name
- Clarias kapuasensis Sudarto, Teugels & Pouyaud, 2003
- Clarias kapuasensis (Borneo)

= Clarias kapuasensis =

Species of fish

Clarias kapuasensis is a species of clariid catfish from Borneo. It has been described from the upper part of the River Kapuas (Western Kalimantan, Indonesia)

== Habitat and distribution ==
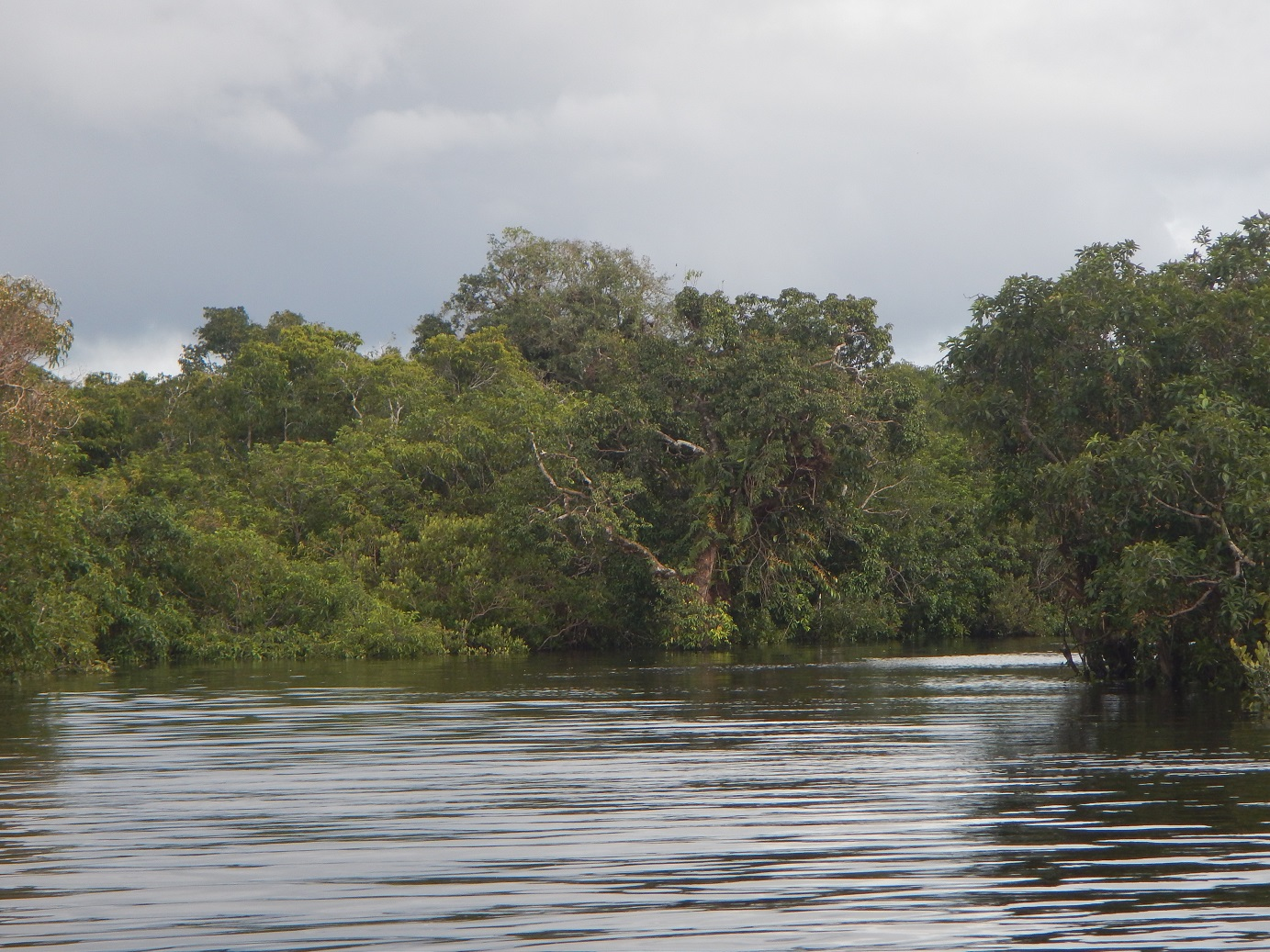
Supposed habitat of Clarias kapuasensis, swamps around Lake Sentarum

It can be found in peat swamps just bordering the Kapuas river and its tributaries; the holotype was collected in swampy areas alongside the river Melawi in the upper part of the Kapuas River, with paratypes collected in peat swamps just bordering Lake Sentarum, both locations in West Kalimantan Province, Borneo.

== Characteristics ==
Recently described, the holotype for this specimen was noted to be of a length of 210 mm (21 cm) from skull to caudal fin, with the 20 paratypes also recorded ranging from 135 to 260 mm (13.5–26 cm).

Live coloration has been noted to range from dark-olive green to dark brown, fading to greyish or whitish coloring on ventral surface with dorsal and ventral fins being greenish or brownish with a black margin. Big white or yellow spots are also common, as so in other Asian forest Clarias species.

== See also ==
- Clarias nieuhofii
- Clarias pseudoleiacanthus
- Clarias batrachus
