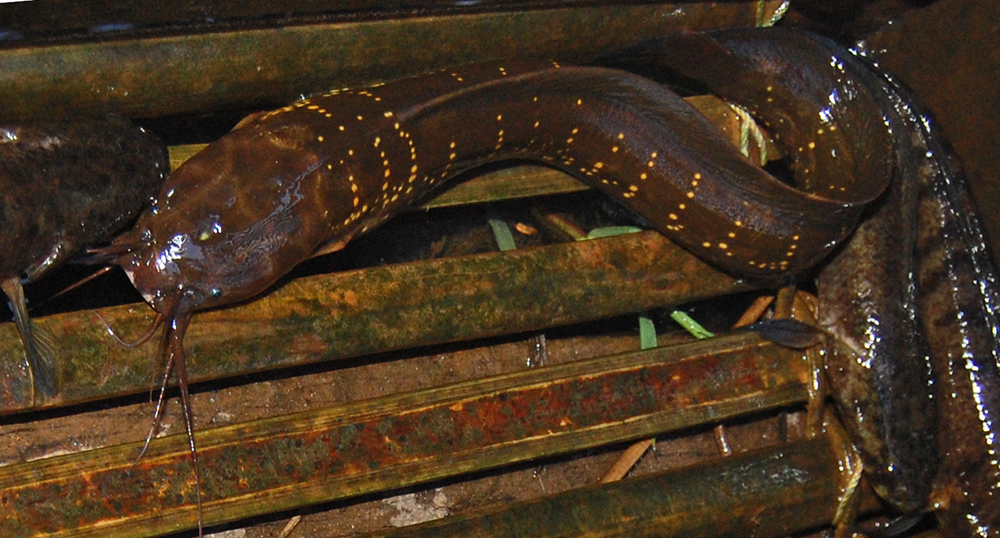
- Clarias nieuhofii from Mentaya Hulu, Central Kalimantan

Conservation status
- Least Concern (IUCN 3.1)

Scientific classification
- Kingdom: Animalia
- Phylum: Chordata
- Class: Actinopterygii
- Order: Siluriformes
- Family: Clariidae
- Genus: Clarias
- Species: C. nieuhofii

Binomial name
- Clarias nieuhofii Valenciennes, 1840

Synonyms
- Clarias pentapterus Bleeker, 1851; Clarias gilli Smith & Seale, 1906

= Clarias nieuhofii =

Species of fish

Clarias nieuhofii, the slender walking catfish, is a species of clariid catfish. It has a wide distribution in Southeast Asia including southern Vietnam, Cambodia, Thailand, Malay Peninsula, parts of the Greater Sunda Islands (Indonesia and Malaysia, including Borneo), and the Philippines.

Named in honor of Johan Nieuhof (1618-1672), Dutch East India Company, who described and illustrated this species in 1682 (but later examination of Nieuhof's illustration reveals it is a different species).

This species can be distinguished from other Clarias catfishes, apart from the recently discovered Clarias batu and Clarias nigricans, by the greatly elongated body which gives it a remarkably eel-like appearance. The colour is generally grey with two rows of white spots running along the length of the body just below the lateral line and 13 or 14 vertical rows of white spots just above the line. Specimens of up to 50 cm (19.7 inches) standard length have been recorded.
