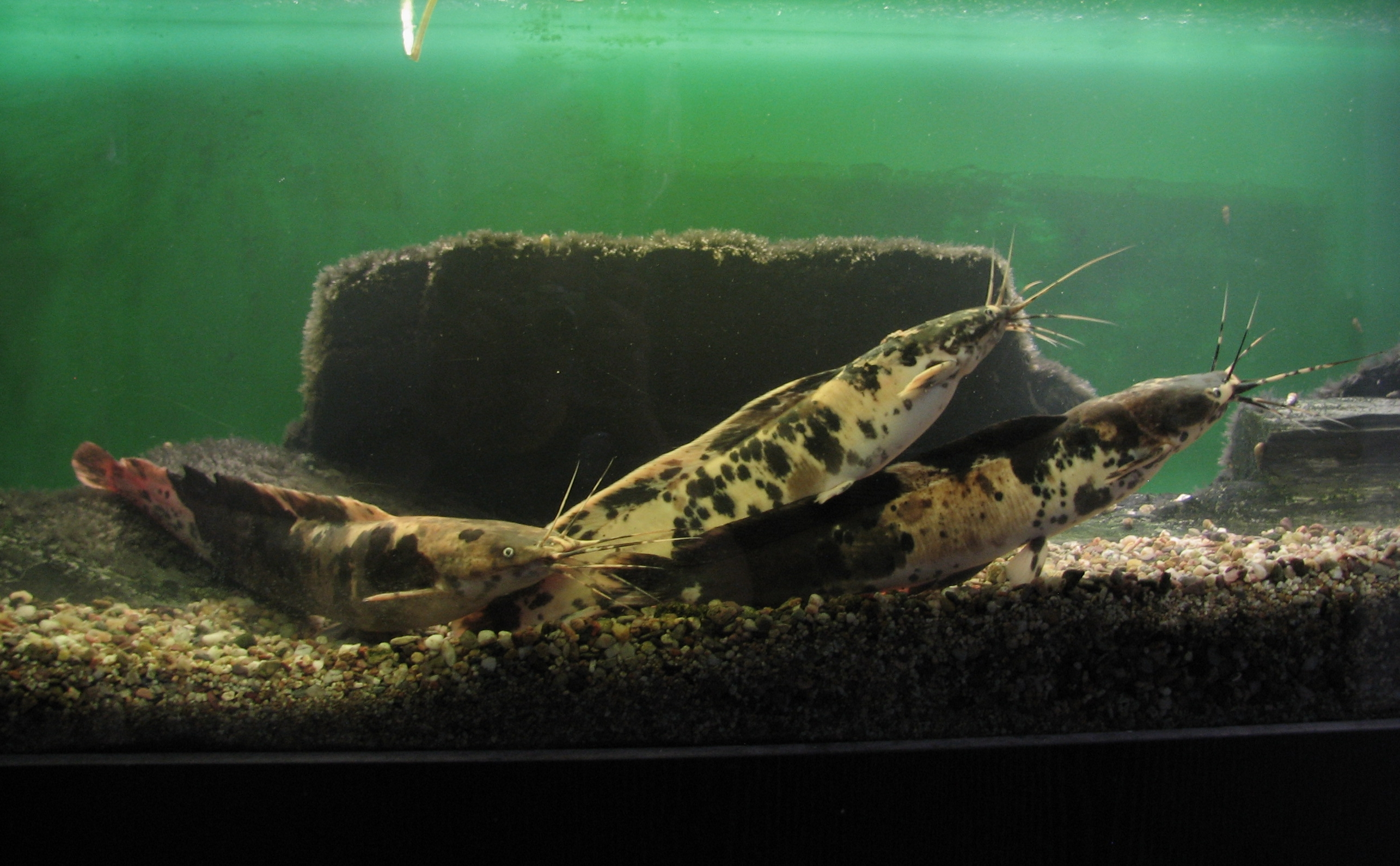
- Clarias batrachus at Brno Zoo

Scientific classification
- Kingdom: Animalia
- Phylum: Chordata
- Class: Actinopterygii
- Division: Teleostei
- Order: Siluriformes
- Superfamily: Siluroidea
- Family: Clariidae; Bonaparte, 1846

Genera
- Bathyclarias; Channallabes; Clariallabes; Clarias; Dinotopterus; Dolichallabes; Encheloclarias; Gymnallabes; Heterobranchus; Heteropneustes; Horaglanis; Platyallabes; Platyclarias; Pseudotanganikallabes; Tanganikallabes; Uegitglanis; Xenoclarias

= Airbreathing catfish =

Family of fishes

Airbreathing catfish comprise the family Clariidae of the order Siluriformes. This family is made up of seventeen genera and about 123 species, all of which inhabit freshwater . Clariids are called the airbreathing catfishes because of their possession of a suprabranchial respiratory organ that allows aerial respiration. Other catfishes are also known to facultatively breathe air, such as the Callichthyidae and Loricariidae. However, clariids are the only catfishes known to possess an accessory breathing organ.

== Distribution ==
Clariids are Old World catfishes, that occur throughout Africa and tropical Eurasia. Of the 17 clariid genera, 12 are restricted to Africa and three (Horaglanis, Heteropneustes, and Encheloclarias) occur only in Asia, with a single genus Clarias occurring in both Africa and Asia. A single widespread species, Clarias gariepinus ranges from South Africa into the Middle East, as far north as Türkiye.

== Description ==
Clariid catfish are characterized by an elongated body, the presence of four barbels, long dorsal and anal fins, and especially by the autapomorphic presence of a suprabranchial organ, formed by tree-like structures from the second and fourth gill arches. This suprabranchial organ, or labyrinth organ, allows some species the capability of traveling short distances on land (walking catfish).

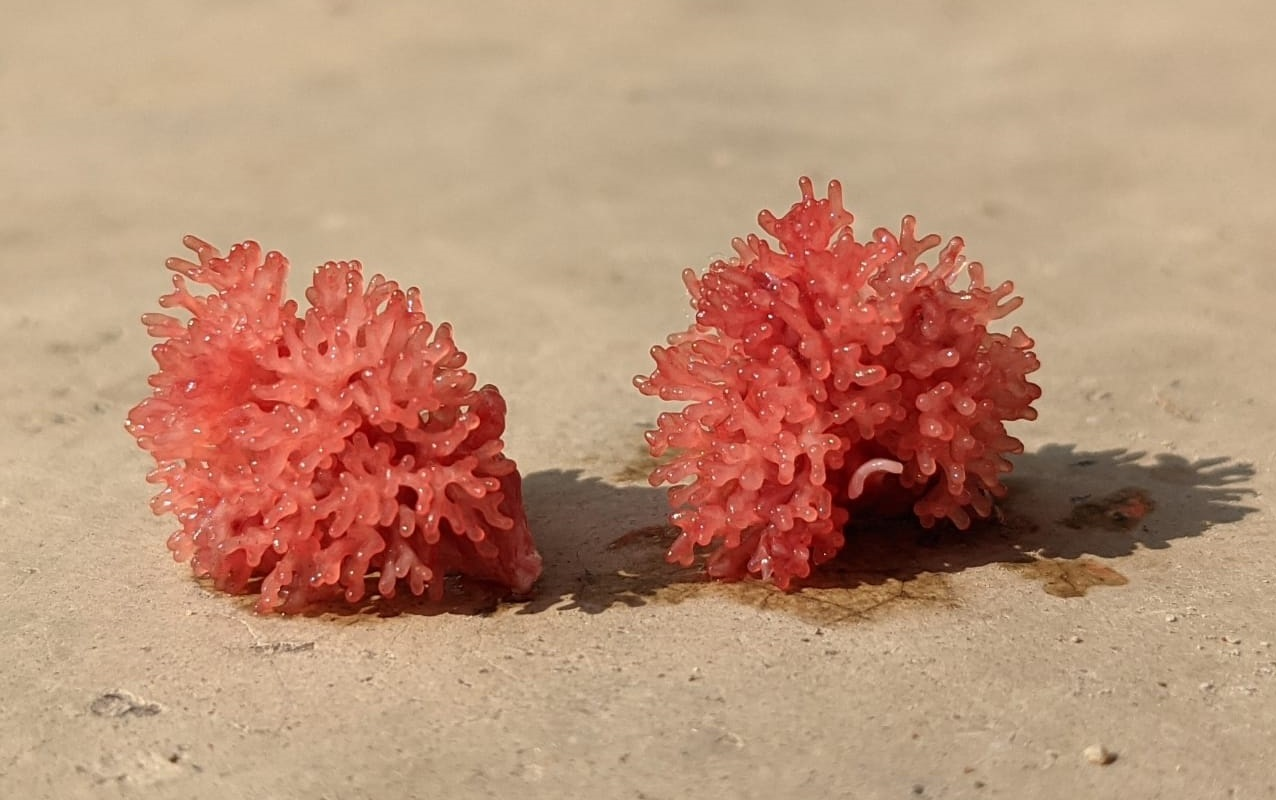
Air-breathing organ of walking catfish

The dorsal fin base is very long and is not preceded by a fin spine. The dorsal fin may or may not be continuous with the caudal fin, which is rounded. Pectoral and pelvic fins are variously absent in some species. Some fish have small eyes and reduced or absent pectoral and pelvic fins for a burrowing lifestyle. A few species lack eyes entirely.

Within the family Clariidae, body forms range from fusiform (torpedo-like) to anguilliform (eel-like). As species become more eel-shaped, a whole set of morphological changes has been observed, such as decrease and loss of the adipose fin, continuous unpaired fins, reduction of paired fins, reduction of the eyes, reduction of the skull bones, and hypertrophied jaw muscles.

== Taxonomy ==
The genus Heteropneustes has been considered by some to comprise a separate family, the Heteropneustidae. A recent phylogenetic analysis of the family supported inclusion of Heteropneustes within Clariidae. Heteropneustes lacks the long, spineless dorsal fin typical of other clariids, but otherwise shares many morphological features in common with Clarias.

== Relationship to humans ==
Many clariids form a large part of artisanal fisheries. Clarias gariepinus is recognized as one of the most promising aquaculture species in Africa.

The airbreathing capacity of these fish has allowed such fish as Clarias batrachus to be an invasive species in Florida.
