= Sara language =

Sara language may refer to:

- Sara language (Indonesia), a language spoken in Kalimantan in Indonesia
- Sara languages, a family of Bongo–Bagirmi languages spoken mainly in southern Chad
  - Sar language, lingua franca of the regional capital of Sarh
  - Sara Gula language, a Bongo–Bagirmi language of Chad
  - Sara Kaba language, one of several local languages called Kaba or Sara
  - Sara Laka language, also known as Kabba Laka
  - Sara Mbay language, a Bongo–Bagirmi language of Chad and the Central African Republic
  - Sara Ngam language, a Bongo–Bagirmi language of Chad and the Central African Republic
