= Kara language =

Kara language may refer to:

- Kara language (Korea), a language of the Gaya confederacy in southern Korea
- Kara language (Papua New Guinea), an Austronesian language spoken in the Kavieng District, Papua New Guinea
- Kara language (Tanzania), a Bantu language spoken by the Kara people of Tanzania
- Kara languages, a group of languages spoken in the Central African Republic
  - Kara or Tar Gula language
- Kara or Fer language, spoken in the Central African Republic
- Kàrà, a dialect of the Northwest Gbaya language, spoken in Cameroon and the Central African Republic
- Caranqui language, also spelled Cara or Kara, an extinct language of Ecuador

== See also ==
- Karo language (disambiguation)
- Qwara language, a western Agaw dialect spoken in Ethiopia
- Kara (disambiguation)
