= Gula =

Gula may refer to:

- Gula (animal), Dharug language name for the koala bear and origin of the word "koala"
- Gula (crater), a crater on Jupiter's moon Ganymede
- Gula (cyclone), a tropical cyclone from the 2007–08 South-West Indian Ocean cyclone season
- Gula (ethnic group), a tribal people living in western Liberia
- Gula (goddess), an Ancient Mesopotamian goddess of medicine
  - Kudurru of Gula, a famous boundary stone for this goddess, exhibited in the Louvre
- Gula language (disambiguation), several African languages
- Gula Mons, a volcano on Venus
- Gula People, an ethnic group who live in Central African Republic, Chad, and Sudan
- Gula (surname); see there for a list of people with that name
- "Gula", a song by Progressive house artist deadmau5 from the 2014 album "while (1<2)"
- Gula, Latin name for the vice of gluttony, one of the Seven Deadly Sins
- Gula, Indomalayan term for sugar
- Gula, the "throat" piece on the head capsule of some insects
- Gullah, a people of African origin living on the islands and coastal regions of Georgia and South Carolina

== See also ==
- Gular (disambiguation)
