= Gberi people =

Gberi is an ethnic group in South Sudan. Its members speak Mo'da, one of the Nilo-Saharan languages. Gberi live near Mvolo County in Western Equatoria State.
