= Ethnic groups in Chad =

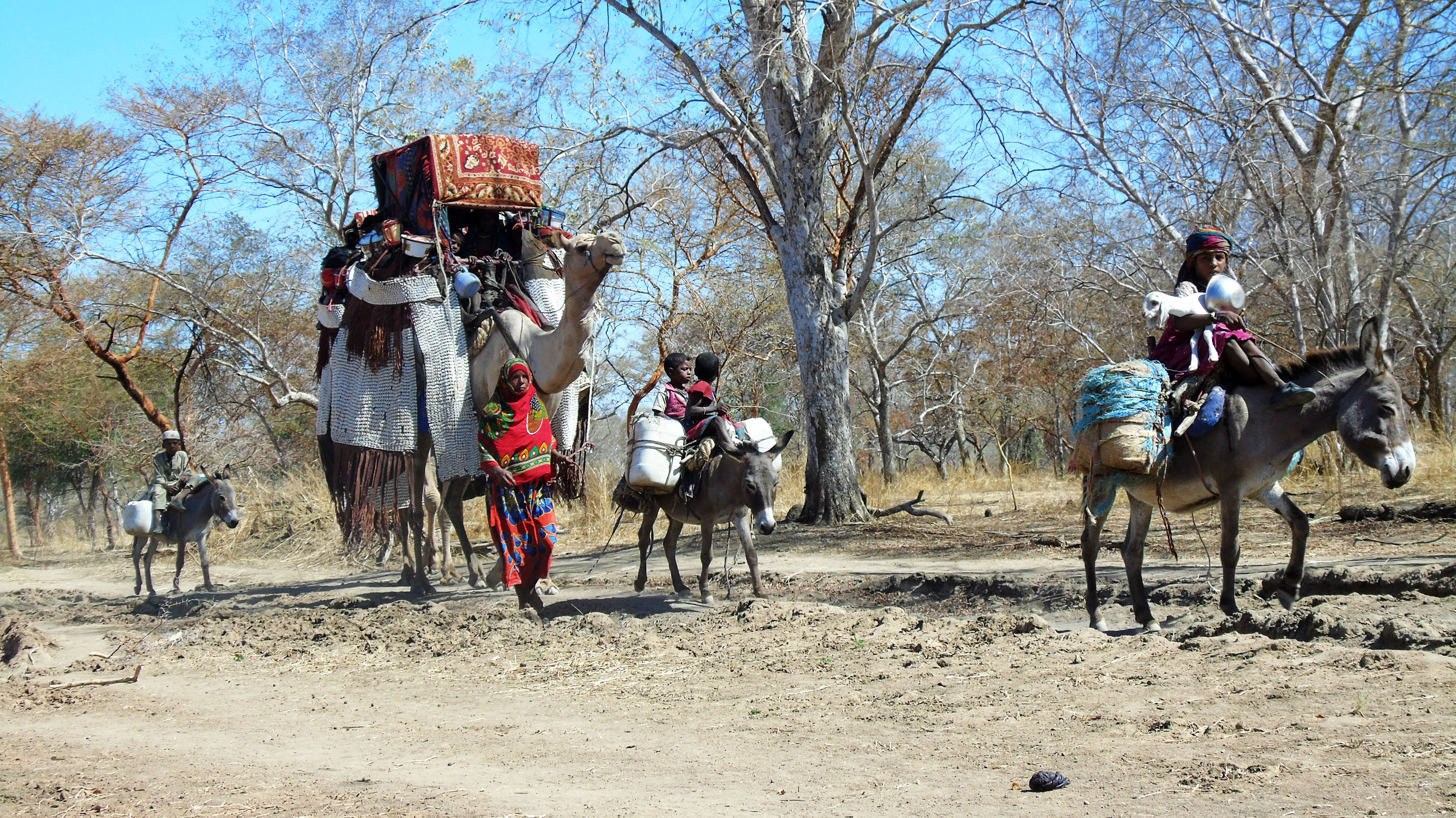
Caravan of Chadian Arab nomads

The population of Chad has numerous ethnic groups. SIL Ethnologue reports more than 130 distinct languages spoken in Chad.

== History and demographics ==
The 14 million inhabitants of Chad belong to some 200 ethnicities, who speak numerous languages. The peoples of Chad carry significant ancestry from Eastern, Central, Western, and Northern Africa. The population can be broadly divided between those in the east, north and west who follow Islam, and the peoples of the south, the five southernmost prefectures, who are mostly Christian or animist. The southern part of the country was historically the cross roads of the caravan routes below the Sahara, forming a link between West Africa and the Arabic region, as well as one between North Africa and sub-Saharan Africa. The slave trade between sub-Saharan Africa and the Middle East passed through the slave markets of Chad and Western Sudan, slave-trading was a key component of Chad's historic economy, and this brought people of various ethnicities into Chad. The CIA Factbook estimates the largest ethnic groups as of the 2014-2015 census as:

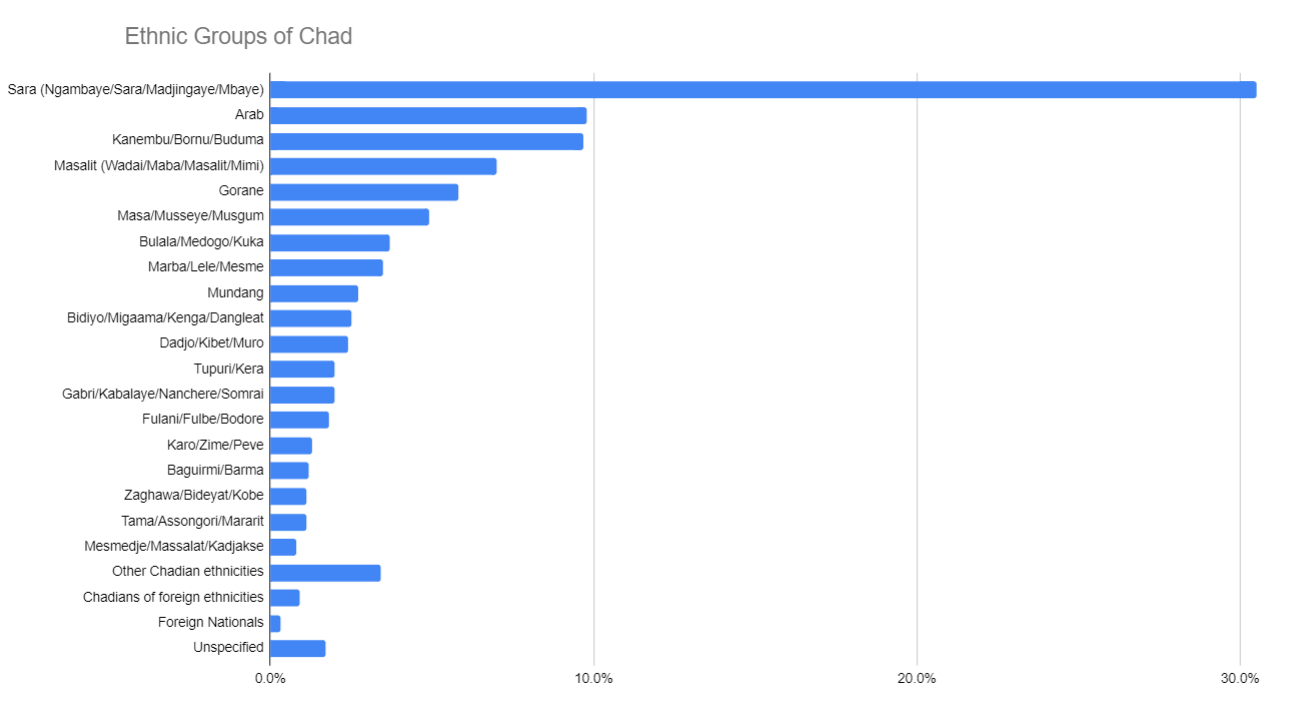
Ethnic groups by percentage of population

Groups	Percentage
Sara (Ngambaye/Sara/Madjingaye/Mbaye)	30.5%
Arabs	15.8%
Kanembu/Bornu/Buduma	10.3%
Masalit people (Wadai/Maba/Masalit/Mimi)	5.0%
Gorane	8.8%
Bilala/Medogo/Kuka	3.7%
Marba/Lele/Mesme	3.5%
Mundang	2.7%
Bidiyo/Migaama/Kenga/Dangleat	2.5%
Dadjo/Kibet/Muro	2.4%
Tupuri/Kera	2.0%
Gabri/Kabalaye/Nanchere/Somrai	2.0%
Fulani/Fulbe/Bodore	1.8%
Karo/Zime/Peve	1.3%
Baguirmi/Barma	1.2%
Zaghawa/Bideyat/Kobe	1.1%
Tama/Assongori/Mararit	1.1%
Mesmedje/Massalat/Kadjakse	0.8%
Other Chadian ethnicities	3.4%
Chadians of foreign ethnicities	0.9%
Foreign nationals	0.3%
Unspecified	1.7%

Other little-known ethnic groups believed to be living in Chad include the Kujarke people.

== Muslim groups ==
Islamization began as early as the 8th century and was mostly complete by the 11th, when Islam became the official religion of the Kanem–Bornu Empire.

Muslim groups other than the Shuwa include the Toubou, Hadjerai, Fulbe/Fulani, Kotoko, Kanembou, Baguirmi, Boulala, Zaghawa, and Maba.

== Language and ethnic groups ==
Ethno-linguistically, the groups may be divided into:

- Chadian Arabic-speaking Shuwa
- Chadic: Marba,
- Nilo-Saharan:
  - Maba (Ouaddai)
  - Saharan: Kanembu, Kanuri, Zaghawa, Toubou
  - Eastern Sudanic: Ouaddai
  - Central Sudanic: Baguirmi, Sinyar
- Niger–Congo:
  - Bua
  - Atlantic-Congo: Fula people.

== See also ==
- List of ethnic groups in Chad
- Languages of Chad
- Demographics of Chad
