= Horo language =

Extinct Bongo–Bagirmi language of Chad

Horo
- Hor
- Native to: Chad
- Extinct: early 20th century
- Language family: Nilo-Saharan?: Central Sudanic; Bongo–Bagirmi; Sara; East; Horo

Language codes
- ISO 639-3: hor
- Glottolog: horo1247

Horo (Hor) is an extinct Bongo–Bagirmi language of Chad. Speakers shifted to Ngam.
