= Sama language (disambiguation) =

The Sama language is the language of the Sama people of the Sulu Archipelago and the Bajau of Sabah, Malaysia.

- Sama language (Angola), a Bantu language of Angola
- Sama language (Gabon), a minor Bantu language of Gabon
- Sama–Bajaw languages, a group of languages spoken by the Bajau and Sama peoples of the Philippines, Indonesia and Malaysia
- Pangutaran Sama language, the language of the Sama people of the Sulu Archipelago

== See also ==
- Samo language (disambiguation)
- Sara language (disambiguation)
