= Sinyar =

Sinyar may refer to:

- Sinyar people
- Sinyar language
