= KYQ =

KYQ or kyq may refer to:

- KYQ, the Indian Railways station code for Kamakhya Junction railway station, Assam, India
- kyq, the ISO 639-3 code for Kenga language, Chad
