= Kujarke people =

Kujarke
Total population
- perhaps 1,000 in 1981

Regions with significant populations
- Sudan and Chad

Languages
- Kujargé

Religion
- Animism

The Kujarke people (also spelled Kujargé) are a little-known ethnic group of the Ouaddaï Region in eastern Chad and South Darfur, Sudan. They speak Kujargé, a divergent, unclassified Afro-Asiatic language. Their current population and locations are unknown due to the war in Darfur. Furthermore, they have not been previously recorded as a separate ethnic group by any government or foreign aid organization.

== Current status ==
Due to the war in Darfur, most Kujarke may now be living in refugee camps in the Goz Beïda and Dar Sila regions of eastern Chad. However, the Kujarke have not been recorded as a separate group by any government or foreign aid organization. As a result, Kujarke may have been passing themselves off as Daju or Fur. The first time the Kujarke had been mentioned in over 25 years was when French anthropologist Jerome Tubiana had interviewed a Daju village chief in Tiero. The chief of Tiero mentioned that a Kujarke village had been burned to the ground by the Janjaweed in 2007 during an ethnic cleansing campaign against the Daju people. Nothing else is known about the current state of the Kujarke people.

According to Paul Doornbos, the Kujarke had lived mainly by hunting and gathering due to the climate, terrain, and unstable seasonal water supply of the Dar Fongoro area being inhospitable for intensive agriculture and animal husbandry. Honey was one of their main foods obtained through foraging.

== Ethnic relations ==
The Kujarge refer to themselves as Kujartenin Debiya. They are surround by the Daju-Galfigé to the west, the Sinyar to the north, and the Fur-Dalinga, Fongoro, Formono, and Runga to the east and south. Historically, they had been ruled by the Daju sultans, and may have been slaves of the Daju.

Also, Lebeuf (1959) reports that the Daju Nyala refer to the Darfur Birgid as Kajargé.

Although the Kujarke were mostly endogamous, Sinyar men may have also intermarried with Kujarke women, as Kijaar was the name of one of the 18 Sinyar clans. The Kijaar clan was located closer to the core Kujarke area of Jebel Mirra than all of the other Sinyar clans.

== Religion ==
The Kujarke are not Muslims and practice a secret religion that is yet unrecorded, as the Kujarke would lead visitors to a perimeter outside their village whenever they needed to perform their prayers.

The name Kujargé (also spelled Kujarke) is derived from Sudanese Arabic kujur "sorcerer", due to their reputation for witchcraft among the Sinyar people.

== Language documentation ==
In 1981, Dutch anthropologist Paul Doornbos had spent 4–5 hours eliciting a basic vocabulary list of Kujarke from a father and son (Arbab Yahia Basi, born Ndundra, who was 35 years old in 1981) in Ro Fatá, near Foro Boranga, Darfur. The first 100 words were elicited from the informant's father, who was nearly deaf and had limited knowledge of Arabic, while the second 100 words were provided by the main informant, who may have mixed Kujarke with Daju and Fur. Part of the interview had also been done in Fur with the help of Doornbos' Fur research assistant. The two disagreed over the Kujarke elicitations, leading Doornbos to doubt the accuracy of the list. Doornbos also speculates that in 1981, Kujarke may have already been a dying language with few speakers left, although their population may have exceeded 1,000 people in 1981.

The father and son had also disagreed about the origins of the Kujarke people. According to the son, the Kujarke had originally lived in the mountain ranges to east of the Wadi Azum, namely the Jebel Kulli, Jebel Toya, Jebel Kunjaro, Jebel Turabu, Jebel Oromba, and Jebel Kire. Later, they were forced to migrate to Chad during the time of the Fur sultans. However, the father claimed that the original Kujarke homeland had only been in Chad.
