= Bongo people =

Bongo people may refer to:

- Bongo people (Gabon), western Pygmies
- Bongo people (South Sudan)
