= Afudu language =

Afudu may refer to:

- Furu language, as cited in Koelle 1854
- An unidentified Yukubenic language
- A dialect of Tangale
