= Lutos =

Lutos may be,

- Lutos language
- Battle of Lutos
