= Kujargé language =

Unclassified language of eastern Chad and western Sudan

Kujargé
- Native to: Chad
- Region: Jebel Mirra
- Ethnicity: Kujarke
- Native speakers: (1,000 cited 1983)
- Language family: Unclassified, possibly Chadic or Cushitic, or an isolate

Language codes
- ISO 639-3: vkj
- Glottolog: kuja1239
- ELP: Kujarge

The Kujargé language is spoken in seven villages in eastern Chad near Jebel Mirra (11°45′N 22°15′E), and in villages scattered along the lower Wadi Salih and Wadi Azum in Darfur, Sudan. It is estimated to have about 1,000 speakers (as of 1983).

== Background ==
The name Kujargé (also spelled Kujarke) is derived from the Sudanese Arabic word كجور (kujur, "sorcerer"), due to the Kujarke's reputation for practicing witchcraft among the Sinyar people.

The speakers were reported to live mainly by hunting and gathering due to the climate, terrain, and unstable seasonal water supply of the Dar Fongoro area being inhospitable for intensive agriculture and animal husbandry. Honey was one of their main foods obtained through foraging.

The Kujarge refer to themselves as Kujartenin Debiya. They are surrounded by the Daju-Galfigé to the west, the Sinyar to the north, and the Fur-Dalinga, Fongoro, Formono, and Runga to the east and south. Historically, they had been ruled by the Daju sultans, and may have been slaves of the Daju.

Also, Lebeuf (1959) reports that the Daju Nyala refer to the Darfur Birgid as Kajargé.

== Classification ==
Kujarge is unclassified. It is known only from a 200-word list by Doornbos (1981). These include Chadic words, but low numerals and pronouns look very un-Chadic. Blench (2008) notes that much of the basic vocabulary looks Cushitic, and speculates that Kujarge could even be a conservative language transitional between Chadic and Cushitic.

The language had been classified as a member of the Mubi subgroup of East Chadic by Paul Newman; however, Lionel Bender argued that its classification remained uncertain. There may have been a mix-up with Birgit, a nearby Mubi language which is also called Kujarge; when Newman was shown the 200-word list in 2006, he would not commit to it being Chadic.

In addition, there appears to be a large amount of vocabulary that has not been identified as Afro-Asiatic; there is a possibility that it is a language isolate that has been largely relexified by Chadic and Cushitic.

Blažek (2013) purports to show that Kujarge is an East Chadic language.

== Documentation and status ==
In 1981, Dutch anthropologist Paul Doornbos had spent 4–5 hours eliciting a basic vocabulary list of Kujarke from a father and son (Arbab Yahia Basi, born Ndundra, who was 35 years old in 1981) in Ro Fatá, near Foro Boranga, Darfur. The first 100 words were elicited from the informant's father, who was nearly deaf and had limited knowledge of Arabic, while the second 100 words were provided by the main informant, who may have mixed Kujarke with Daju and Fur. Part of the interview had also been done in Fur with the help of Doornbos' Fur research assistant. The two disagreed over the Kujarke elicitations, leading Doornbos to doubt the accuracy of the list. Doornbos also speculates that in 1981, Kujarke may have already been a dying language with few speakers left, although their population may have exceeded 1,000 people in 1981.

The father and son had also disagreed about the origins of the Kujarke people. According to the son, the Kujarke had originally lived in the mountain ranges to east of the Wadi Azum, namely the Jebel Kulli, Jebel Toya, Jebel Kunjaro, Jebel Turabu, Jebel Oromba, and Jebel Kire. Later, they were forced to migrate to Chad during the time of the Fur sultans. However, the father claimed that the original Kujarke homeland had only been in Chad.

Due to the war in Darfur, most Kujarke may now be living in refugee camps in the Goz Beïda and Dar Sila regions of eastern Chad. However, the Kujarke have not been recorded as a separate group by any government or foreign aid organization. As a result, Kujarke may have been passing themselves off as Daju or Fur. The first time the Kujarke had been mentioned in over 25 years was when French anthropologist Jerome Tubiana had interviewed a Daju village chief in Tiero. The chief of Tiero mentioned that a Kujarke village had been burned to the ground by the Janjaweed in 2007 during an ethnic cleansing campaign against the Daju people. Nothing else is known about the current state of the Kujarke people.

== Ethnic group ==
The Kujarke lived in proximity with the Sinyar, Daju, and Fur peoples. Although the Kujarke were mostly endogamous, Sinyar men may have also intermarried with Kujarke women, as Kijaar was the name of one of the 18 Sinyar clans. The Kijaar clan was located closer to the core Kujarke area of Jebel Mirra than all of the other Sinyar clans.

The Kujarke are not Muslims and practice a secret religion that is yet unrecorded, as the Kujarke would lead visitors to a perimeter outside their village whenever they needed to perform their prayers.

== Phonology ==
Judging by the one available wordlist, the consonants appear to be:

	Bilabial	Alveolar	Palatal	Velar
Plosives	b	t d	ɟ	k ɡ
Implosives	ɓ	ɗ		
Prenasalised plosives	ᵐb	ⁿd	ᶮɟ	ᵑɡ
Fricatives	f	s	ʃ	
Continuants	w	l	j	
Nasals	m	n	ɲ	ŋ
Trills		r		

Relatively few consonant clusters are attested; they appear to all involve r+consonant or gemination (unless the prenasalized stops are to be seen as clusters.)

The vowels used in transcribing the same wordlist are: a, e, i, o, u, ʌ, ɛ, ɔ. It is not clear whether all of these are phonemically distinct; [ʌ] and [ɔ], in particular, are rare.

== Grammar ==
The pronouns include annu "I", nigi "you (sg.)". Interrogative pronouns include ŋgayna "what?", ye "who?". Demonstratives include agu "this".

The numbers include:

1. kirre
2. kurro
3. ubo

== See also ==
- Kujarge word list (Wiktionary)
