= NDY =

NDY or ndy may refer to:

- Lutos language, Central African Republic and Chad; by ISO 639-3 language code
- Sanday Airport, Orkney Islands, Scotland; by IATA airport code
