= List of ethnic groups in Chad =

This is a list of ethnic groups in Chad.

== Ethnic groups ==
- Arabs
- Bagirmi
- Maba (Ouaddai)
- Kanembu
- Borno
- Kim
- Lisi
  - Bilala
  - Kuka
  - Medogo
- Masalit
- Sara
- Toubou
- Tupuri
- Mboum (L'Adamaoua Oriental)
- Moussei
- Masa
- Hadjerai
- Kotoko
- Peuvu

(Indented entries in the list are subdivisions of the main entry above them.)

== See also ==
- Ethnic groups in Chad
- Demographics of Chad
