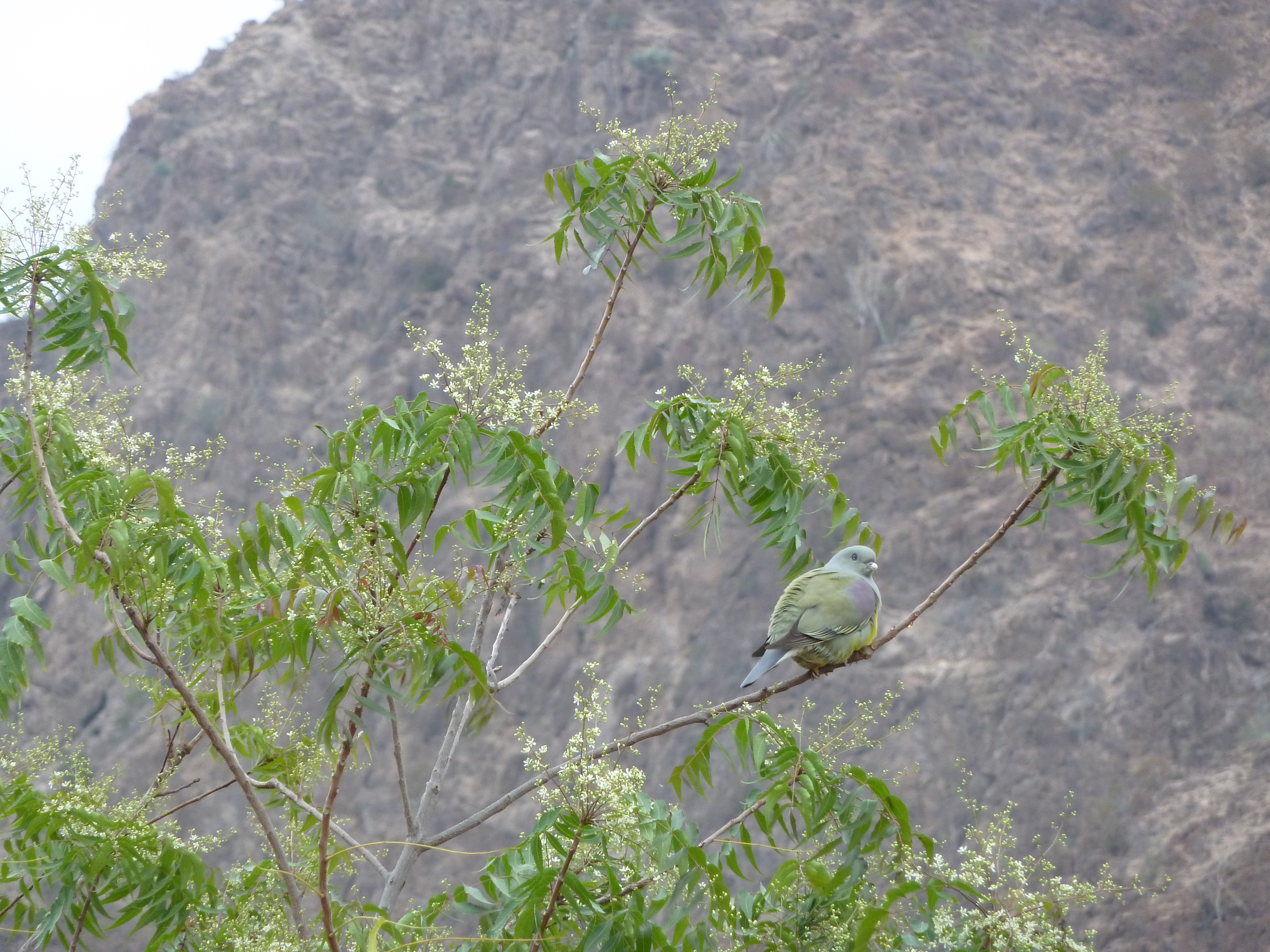
- At Day Forest National Park, Djibouti

Conservation status
- Least Concern (IUCN 3.1)

Scientific classification
- Kingdom: Animalia
- Phylum: Chordata
- Class: Aves
- Order: Columbiformes
- Family: Columbidae
- Genus: Treron
- Species: T. waalia

Binomial name
- Treron waalia (Meyer, 1793)

= Bruce's green pigeon =

Species of bird

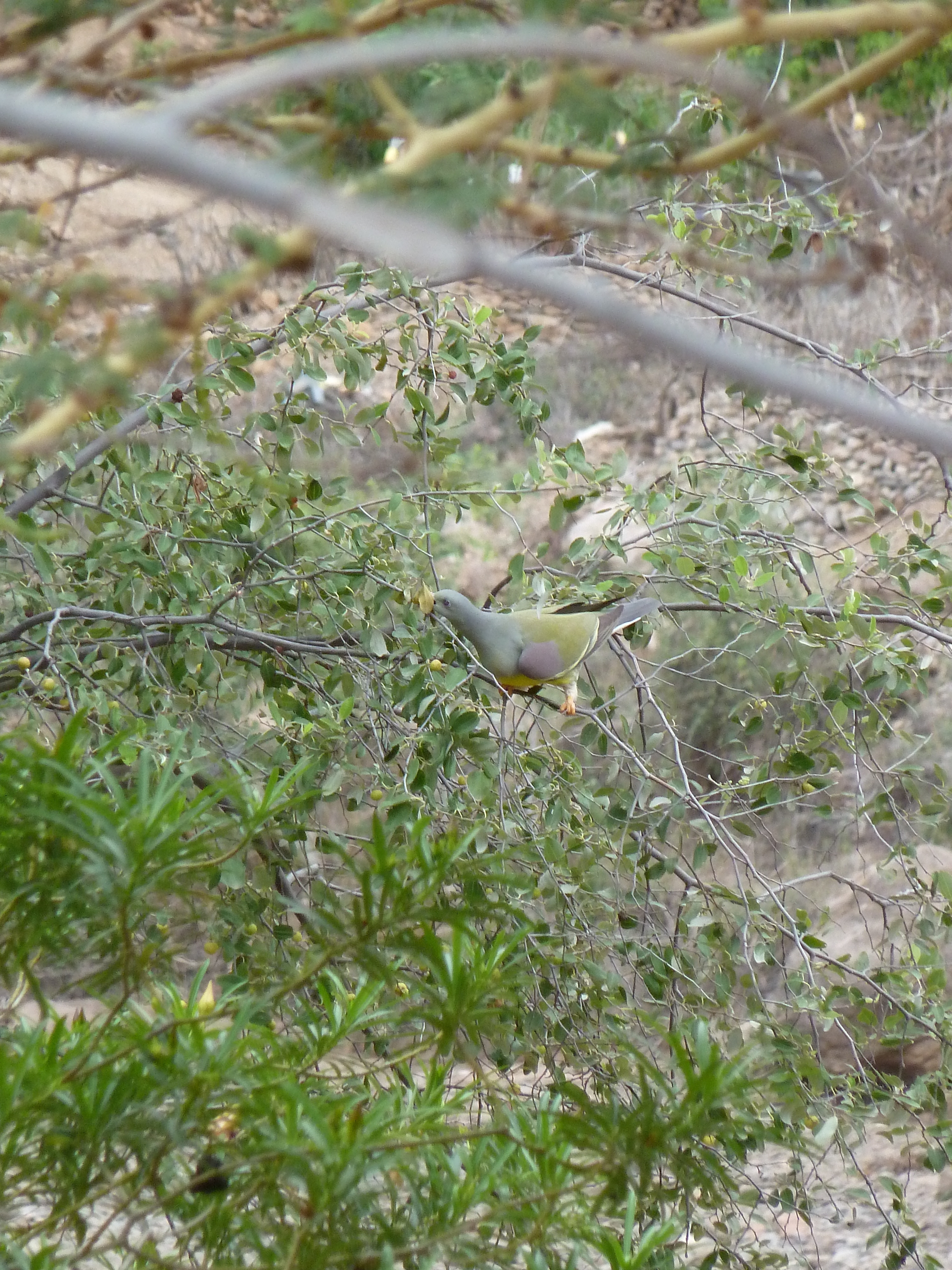
Bruce's Green Pigeon, feeding. Djibouti, 2013

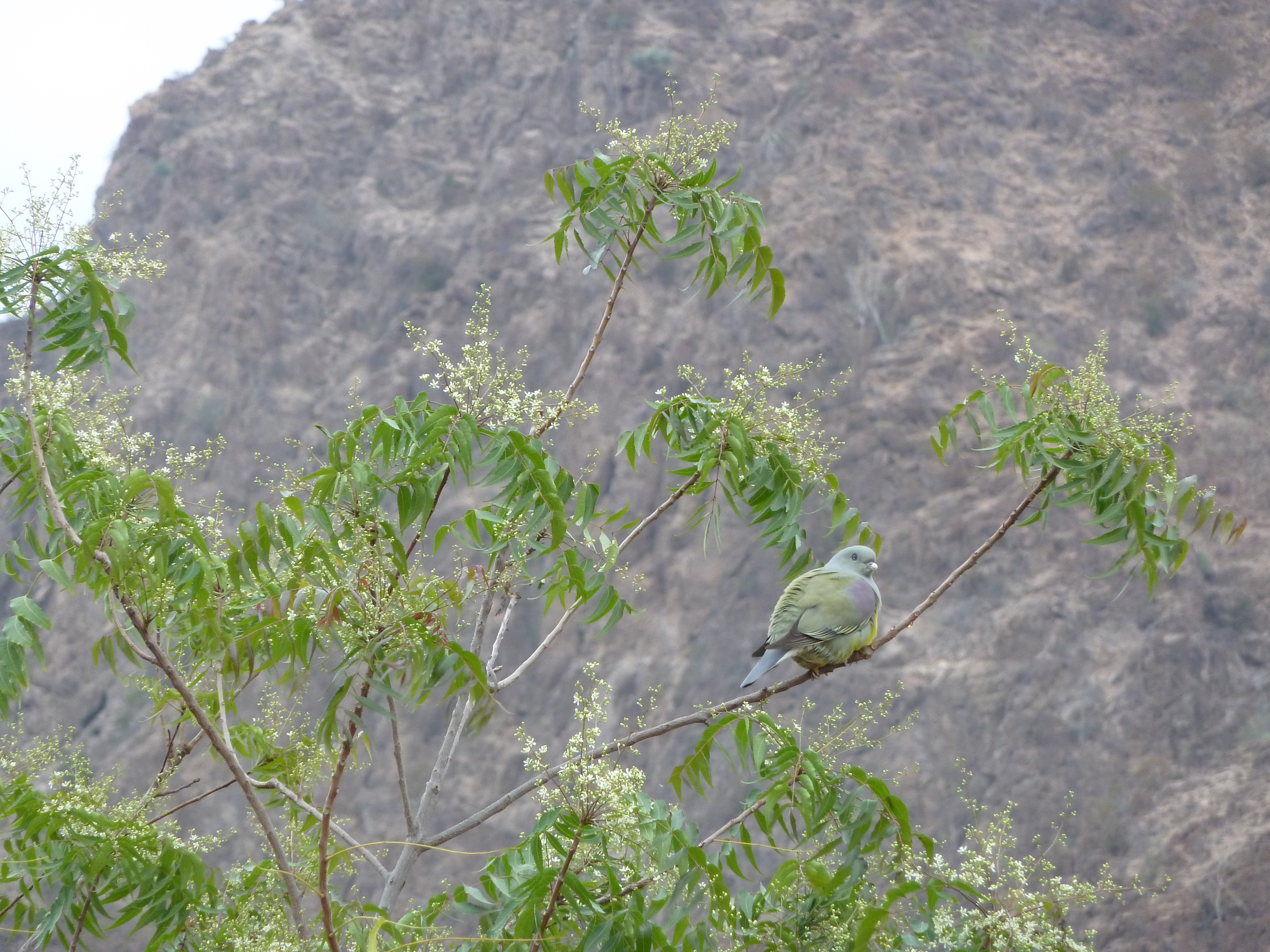
B'sG.P., Djibouti, Foret du Day. 2013.

Bruce's green pigeon (Treron waalia), also known as the yellow-bellied fruit pigeon or the yellow-bellied green pigeon, is a species of bird in the family Columbidae.

Its range extends across the Sudan (region) towards the Red Sea and the Southwestern Arabian foothills savanna and Dhofar Mountains.

It is a frugivore bird species that specialises on eating the fruits of a single species of fig tree, Ficus platyphylla. Unlike most birds, it does not have a uropygial gland.

== Description ==
Despite its name, Bruce's green pigeon is mostly grey with a light yellow breast and olive green upper wings.
