= Disa language =

Bongo–Bagirmi language spoken in Chad

Disa
- Native to: Chad
- Native speakers: (2,400 cited 2000)
- Language family: Nilo-Saharan?: Central Sudanic; Bongo–Bagirmi; Bagirmi; Disa

Language codes
- ISO 639-3: dsi
- Glottolog: disa1239

Disa is a minor Bongo–Bagirmi language of Chad.
