= Tana language =

Tana may be:

- One of the South Vanuatu languages
- Tana language (South Sudan)
