= Gulay language =

Bongo–Bagirmi language spoken in Chad

Gulay
- Native to: Chad
- Native speakers: (160,000 cited 1993 census)
- Language family: Nilo-Saharan?: Central Sudanic; Bongo–Bagirmi; Sara; East; Gulay
- Dialects: Gulay; Pen

Language codes
- ISO 639-3: gvl
- Glottolog: gula1268

Gulay (Gulai, Gulei) is a Bongo–Bagirmi language of Chad. An eighth of speakers are Pen (Peni), and do not like to be called Gulay.

== Writing system ==
Gulay alphabet
a	b	ɓ	č (tch)	e	ə	ԑ	g	h	ɨ	j	k	l
m	n	o	ɔ	r	ɗ	s	t	u	w	y	ɳ (ny)	
