= Dagba language =

Sara language of CAR and Chad

Dagba
- Native to: Central African Republic, Chad
- Ethnicity: Sara people
- Native speakers: 44,000 (2007)
- Language family: Nilo-Saharan?: Central Sudanic; Bongo–Bagirmi; Sara languages; East; Dagba

Language codes
- ISO 639-3: dgk
- Glottolog: dagb1248

Dagba (Daba) is a language of the Sara people in Central African Republic and Chad.
