= Gula language =

Gula language may refer to several African languages:

- Three closely related Bua languages in southern Chad
- Two less closely related Bongo-Baguirmi languages:
  - Gula language (Chad)
  - Tar Gula language in the Central African Republic and Sudan
- Gola language in Liberia

== See also ==
- Gullah language, an African-English creole on the southern coast of the United States
