= Morom language =

Bongo–Bagirmi language of Chad

Morom
- Bernde
- Native to: Chad
- Native speakers: 4,500 (2002)
- Language family: Nilo-Saharan?: Central Sudanic; Bongo–Bagirmi; Bagirmi; Morom

Language codes
- ISO 639-3: bdo
- Glottolog: moro1281

Morom, also known as Bernde, is a Bongo–Bagirmi language of Chad.
