= Bongo language =

Central sudanic language spoken in South Sudan

Bongo
- Ndüü Böngö
- Native to: South Sudan
- Ethnicity: Bongo
- Native speakers: 21,000 (2017)
- Language family: Nilo-Saharan?: Central Sudanic; Bongo–Bagirmi; Bongo–Baka; Bongo
- Writing system: Latin

Language codes
- ISO 639-3: bot
- Glottolog: bong1285
- ELP: Bongo

Bongo (Bungu), also known as Dor, is a Central Sudanic language spoken by the Bongo people in sparsely populated areas of Bahr al Ghazal in South Sudan.

== Phonology ==
=== Consonants ===
| | | Labial | Dental/Alveolar | Palatal | Velar | Labial-velar | Glottal |
|---|---|---|---|---|---|---|---|
| Nasal | | m ⟨m⟩ | n ⟨n⟩ | ɲ ⟨ny⟩ | ŋ ⟨ꞌng⟩ | | |
| Stop | Voiceless | p ⟨p⟩ | t̪ ⟨t⟩ | c~s ⟨c⟩ | k ⟨k⟩ | k͡p ⟨kp⟩ | |
| Stop | Voiced | b ⟨b⟩ | d̪ ⟨d⟩ | ɟ ⟨j⟩ | g ⟨g⟩ | g͡b ⟨gb⟩ | |
| Stop | Nasalized | ᵐb ⟨mb⟩ | ⁿd ⟨nd⟩ | ᶮɟ ⟨nj⟩ | ᵑg ⟨ng⟩ | ᵑg͡b ⟨ngb⟩ | |
| Stop | Implosive | ɓ ⟨ꞌb⟩ | ɗ ⟨ꞌd⟩ | ʄ ⟨ꞌj⟩ | | | |
| Tap | | | ɾ ⟨r⟩ | | | | |
| Fricative | | f ⟨f⟩ | | | | | h ⟨h⟩ |
| Approximant | | | l ⟨l⟩ | j ⟨y⟩ | | w ⟨w⟩ | |

=== Vowels ===
Bongo has ten vowel qualities, which can be long or short.

| | Front | Central | Back |
|---|---|---|---|
| Close | i ⟨ï⟩ | | u ⟨ü⟩ |
| Near-close | ɪ ⟨i⟩ | | ʊ ⟨u⟩ |
| Mid | e ⟨ë⟩ | ə ⟨ä⟩ | o ⟨ö⟩ |
| Near-open | ɛ ⟨e⟩ | | ɔ ⟨o⟩ |
| Open | | a ⟨a⟩ | |

Bongo also has vowel harmony. The "heavy" vowels, written with diaereses, (/i/, /u/, /e/, /o/, /ə/) contrast with the "light" vowels (/ɪ/, /ʊ/, /ɛ/, /ɔ/, /a/).

=== Tone ===
Bongo is tonal language that has the high (á), mid (ā), low (à) and falling (â) tones.

All falling tones occur on either long vowels or on vowel clusters or glides. When the tonal fall is not due to a preceding high tone, it can be indicated by a high tone followed by a low tone.

| Tone | Example | Translation |
|---|---|---|
| high | bʊ́ | 'hungry' |
| low | tɪ̀ɪ̀ | 'pounded sesame' |
| falling | tââ /táà/ | 'when' |

== Numerals ==
Bongo has a quinary-vigesimal numeral system.

| Number | Bongo word |
|---|---|
| 1 | kɔ̀tʊ́ |
| 2 | ŋɡɔ̀r |
| 3 | mʊ̀tːà |
| 4 | ʔɛ́w |
| 5 | múì |
| 6 | dɔ̀kɔtʊ́ |
| 7 | dɔ́ŋɡɔr |
| 8 | dɔ̀mʊ́tːà |
| 9 | dɔ̀mʔɛ́w |
| 10 | kɪ̀ː |
| 11 | kɪː̀ (dɔ̀ː) kɔ̀tʊ́ |
| 12 | kɪː̀ (dɔ̀ː) ŋɡɔ̀r |
| 13 | kɪː̀ (dɔ̀ː) mʊ̀tːà |
| 14 | kɪː̀ (dɔ̀ː) ʔɛ́w |
| 15 | kɪː̀ (dɔ̀ː) múì |
| 16 | kɪː̀ (dɔ̀ː) dɔ̀kɔtʊ́ |
| 17 | kɪː̀ (dɔ̀ː) dɔ́ŋɡɔr |
| 18 | kɪː̀ (dɔ̀ː) dɔ̀mʊ́tːà |
| 19 | kɪː̀ (dɔ̀ː) dɔ̀mʔɛ́w |
| 20 | mbàba kɔ̀tʊ́ |
| 21 | mbàba kɔ̀tʊ́ dɔ̀ː kɔ̀tʊ́ |
| 22 | mbàba kɔ̀tʊ́ dɔ̀ː ŋɡɔ̀r |
| 23 | mbàba kɔ̀tʊ́ dɔ̀ː mʊ̀tːà |
| 24 | mbàba kɔ̀tʊ́ dɔ̀ː ʔɛ́w |
| 25 | mbàba kɔ̀tʊ́ dɔ̀ː múì |
| 26 | mbàba kɔ̀tʊ́ dɔ̀ː dɔ̀kɔtʊ́ |
| 27 | mbàba kɔ̀tʊ́ dɔ̀ː dɔ́ŋɡɔr |
| 28 | mbàba kɔ̀tʊ́ dɔ̀ː dɔ̀mʊ́tːà |
| 29 | mbàba kɔ̀tʊ́ dɔ̀ː dɔ̀mʔɛ́w |
| 30 | mbàba kɔ̀tʊ́ dɔ̀ː kɪ̀ː |
| 40 | mbàba ŋɡɔ̀r |
| 50 | mbàba ŋɡɔ̀r dɔ̀ː kɪ̀ː |
| 60 | mbàba mʊ̀tːà |
| 70 | mbàba mʊ̀tːà dɔ̀ː kɪ̀ː |
| 80 | mbàba ʔɛ́w |
| 90 | mbàba ʔɛ́w dɔ̀ː kɪ̀ː |
| 100 | mbàla múì |
| 200 | mbàba múì dɔ̀ː múì |
| 1000 | mbuda kɔ̀tʊ́ |
| 2000 | mbuda ŋɡɔ̀r |

== Scholarship ==
The first ethnologists to work with the Bongo language were John Petherick, who published Bongo word lists in his 1861 work, Egypt, the Soudan, and Central Africa; Theodor von Heuglin, who also published Bongo word lists in Reise in das Gebiet des Weissen Nil, &c. 1862-1864 in 1869; and Georg August Schweinfurth, who contributed sentences and vocabularies in his Linguistische Ergebnisse, Einer Reise Nach Centralafrika in 1873. E. E. Evans-Pritchard published additional Bongo word lists in 1937.

More recent scholarship has been done by Eileen Kilpatrick, who published a phonology of Bongo in 1985.
