= Naba language =

Nilo-Saharan language spoken in Chad

Naba
- Tar Melbene
- Native to: Chad
- Region: Batha, Chari-Baguirmi prefectures
- Ethnicity: Lisi
- Native speakers: 510,000 (2019)
- Language family: Nilo-Saharan?: Central Sudanic; Bongo–Bagirmi; Bagirmi; Naba
- Dialects: Bilala; Kuka; Mendogo
- Writing system: Latin

Language codes
- ISO 639-3: mne
- Glottolog: naba1253

Naba is a Nilo-Saharan language spoken by approximately 500,000 people in Chad. Those who speak this language are called Lisi, a collective name for three closely associated ethnic groups, the Bilala, the Kuka and the Medogo, that represent the three dialects in which Naba is subdivided. They live mainly in the Batha Prefecture, but the Kuka also reside in Chari-Baguirmi. Ethnologue estimates the lexical similarity among the three dialects to be no less than 99%. Arabic is often spoken as a second language.

== Phonology ==
=== Consonants ===
		Labial	Alveolar	Palatal	Velar	Glottal
Plosive/ Affricate	plain	(p) b	t d	tʃ dʒ	k ɡ	
Plosive/ Affricate	prenasal	ᵐb	ⁿd	ⁿdʒ	ᵑɡ	
Plosive/ Affricate	implosive	ɓ	ɗ			
Fricative		f	s z			h
Nasal		m	n	ɲ	ŋ	
Rhotic			r / ɻ			
Approximant		w	l	j		

- /f/ can also be heard as [p] in initial position, in free variation.
- /tʃ/ can also be heard as [ʃ] when in intervocalic positions.
- Affricate sounds /tʃ, dʒ/ are heard as palatal stop sounds [c, ɟ] when affected by fortition in pre-consonantal positions.
- /r/ may be heard as approximants [ɻ, ɹ] in intervocalic positions. It may also be pronounced as a uvular trill [ʀ] when before back vowels in intervocalic positions.

=== Vowels ===
	Front	Central	Back
Close	i		u
Mid	e		o
Open		a	

- Vowels /i, u, e, o/ have allophones [ɪ, ʊ, ɛ, ɔ] when in closed syllables.
- A central [ə] may be heard in fast speech and in vowel epenthesis.
