= Morokodo language =

Central Sudanic language spoken in South Sudan

Morokodo
- Native to: South Sudan
- Ethnicity: Morokodo people, Madi people
- Native speakers: c. 50,000 (3,400 native) (2011)
- Language family: Nilo-Saharan?: Central Sudanic; Bongo–Bagirmi; Bongo–Baka; Morokodo

Language codes
- ISO 639-3: Variously: mgc – Morokodo nwm – Nyamusa-Molo gbn – Mo’da (Gberi) mwu – Mittu (extinct)
- Glottolog: gber1234 Gberi-Morokodo-Mittu nyam1279 Nyamusa-Molo
- ELP: Morokodo
- Nyamusa-Molo
- Mo'da
- Mo'da is classified as Critically Endangered by the UNESCO Atlas of the World's Languages in Danger.
- Coordinates: 6.0313,29.7949

Morokodo is a dialect continuum of Central Sudanic languages spoken in South Sudan.

== Names ==
Kodo- Kodo is used as a short form for Morokodo, a slang used by the South Sudanese people

Ma’di- Ma’di people use this as the second representative for Morokodo. Often people say the term “Ma’di Mouth” Several of the related language groups still recognize themselves as Ma’di and class themselves Ma’di people.

Moru: Kodo- Third name commonly used.

== Status ==
Although there are 50,000 speakers of Morokodo, there are only 3,400 native speakers worldwide. There is a scarce amount of printed material of the endangered language and the only published works are missionary publications, such as the translation of the New Testament and song/prayer booklets by the Catholic missionaries.There is no signs of revitalization of the Morokodo language, and other languages such as English and Arabic are becoming more dominant in Sudan due to the growing diversity of people and the expansion of property productions in the area.

== Phonology ==
This language group has both advanced tongue root [+ATR] and retracted tongue root [-ATR] vowels. The most common number of phonemic vowels in the language family is nine. The retracted tongue root set is the basic set of vowels. Phonetically, in regards to vowel harmony, the advanced tongue root set is more dominant. The [+ATR] vowel changes the pronunciation of a neighbouring and the [-ATR] vowel is to correspond to the [+ATR] vowel.

There are three tones in the Morokodo language: mid, low and high tones. Ma'di has compounds and some poor deducing processes. Differentiation of the noun, verb, adjective, postposition, as well as recognizing the existence of words that's categories are not as easily found as any of these, and is possibly best called adverbs. Lexical word classes can show the different inflectional behaviour, and are differentiated by characteristic tonal patterns. Loanwords also have a distinctive tonal pattern. All language processes and factors of the language are commonly found.
