= Kara languages =

Kara
- Tar Gula
- Geographic distribution: Central African Republic
- Linguistic classification: Nilo-Saharan?: Central Sudanic; Bongo–Bagirmi; Kara
- Subdivisions: Tar Gula

Language codes
- Glottolog: ferg1237 (Fer-Gula)

The Kara languages are Tar Gula and possibly related Central Sudanic languages of the Central African Republic. The name Kara is used for numerous other peoples of the region, and so is often ambiguous.

Ethnologue 16 lists three Kara languages, Gula, Furu (Bagero), and Yulu (Yulu–Binga). However, of these, Blench (2012) accepts only Gula. He places Furu with the Kresh dialect cluster and Yulu as an isolate within Bongo–Bagirmi. Nonetheless, he retain the Kara branch, also with three languages: Gula, Kara of Birao, and Kara of Sudan. Ethnologue treats Kara (Sudan) as a synonym of Gula, being merely the Gula spoken across the border in Sudan. The Kara of Birao it leaves unclassified. However, it lists Fer (Dam Fer, Fertit) as synonyms; in Blench's and earlier classifications, Fer is a Bagirmi language, and Ethnologue does not list a separate Fer language for CAR. Thus it is possible that the Kara branch is synonymous with the Gula language.
