= Kara people =

Ethnic group in South Sudan and Central African Republic

Total population
- over 100,000

Regions with significant populations
- Western Bahr el Ghazal in South Sudan; Central African Republic

Languages
- Gula language

Religion
- traditional African religions

The Kara are an ethnic group inhabiting South Sudan and the Central African Republic. They speak the Gula language, and Nilo-Saharan, which is a Central Sudanic language.

The Kara religion is an animist faith. As a population, they exceed 100,000 members. They are primarily concentrated in South Sudan's Western Bahr el Ghazal state.

== Daily life ==
The Kara are a semi-nomadic people. They live in round huts made up of a framework of tree branches plastered with mud and the conical roof thatched with local grasses. A typical Kara village has 20 to 30 huts around a meeting place and also features enclosures of branches to keep cattle and goats. The Kara tribe grows sorghum, corn, beans, pumpkins and peanuts. The staples are sorghum, made into a porridge either with milk or water; the latter is eaten with a spicy stew of vegetables, and milk, meat and blood. Meat is eaten on special occasions and milk and blood are drunk freely. Sorghum is also fermented to make beer. Men wear only a piece of cloth wound around the waist, knee high, with an extra cloth slung over the shoulder. Men always shave their heads, while women plait their hair into many braids and decorate them with beads. Women wear only a pleated cowskin skirt. Both sexes wear jewellery.
