= Bongo people (South Sudan) =

Ethnic group in South Sudan

The Bongo are a Central Sudanic speaking ethnic group, living at the eastern side of the Albert Nile River in northwestern Uganda and in neighbouring South Sudan in small, scattered settlements south and east of Wau. They speak the Bongo language, one of the Bongo-Baka languages. In the early 1990s, their number was estimated at 200.000 people, with 40% Muslims. Unlike the Dinka and other Nilotic ethnic groups, the Bongo are not a cattle herding people and do not use cows for bride price. Subsistence farming and hunting is the primary source of food, though money is obtained by working in forestry, building, selling honey, and other various means. Before imported metalwork became available, they were known for their traditional production of iron tools.

Since the 1970s, large size wooden Bongo funerary sculptures of male figures have been collected in Europe and described as important examples of African tribal art.

== History ==
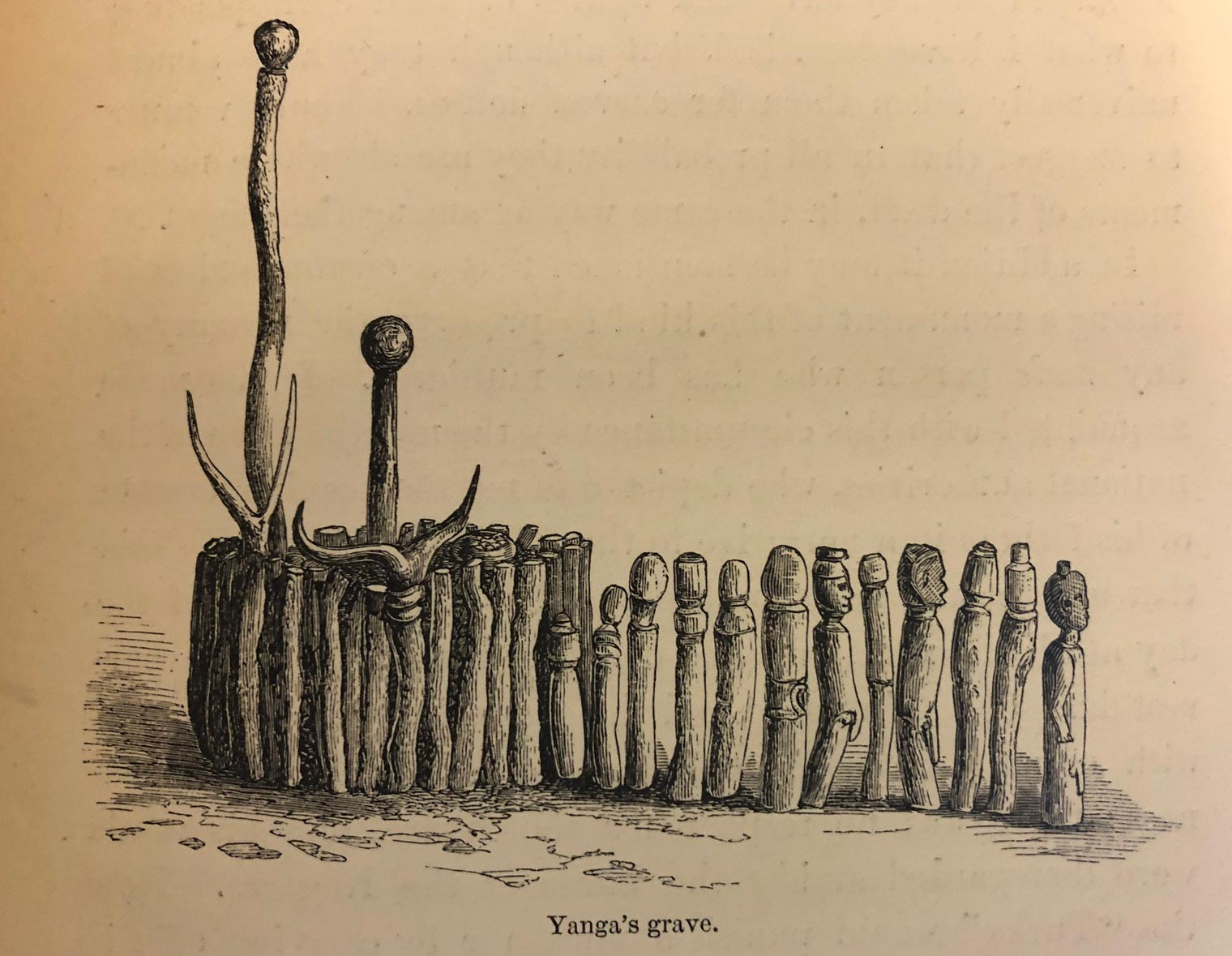
Drawing of Bongo traditional funerary site by Georg Schweinfurth

Georg August Schweinfurth, a German explorer, who lived two years among the Bongo around 1865, reported that before the advent of the slave-raiders, c. 1850, they numbered at least 300,000. Slave-raiders, and later the Mahdist followers from northern Sudan greatly reduced their numbers, and it was not until the establishment of effective control by the colonial Sudan government during 1904 and up to 1906 that recuperation of the population was possible. Before the 20th century, Bongo men wore only a loin-cloth, and many dozen iron rings on the arms (arranged to form a sort of armour), while the women had simply a girdle, to which was attached a tuft of grass. Both sexes now largely use cotton cloths as dresses. The tribal ornaments consisted of nails or plugs, which were passed through the lower lip. The women often wore a disk several inches in diameter in this fashion, together with a ring or a bit of straw in the upper lip, straws in the alae of the nostrils, and a ring in the septum. The Bongo, unlike other inhabitants of the upper Nile, are not mainly cattle-breeders, but employ their time in agriculture. The crops mostly cultivated were sorghum, tobacco, sesame and durra.

In the late 1920s, British anthropologist Evans-Pritchard visited and later described the lifestyle and history of the Bongo people. In 1963, Catholic missionary Stefano Santandrea of the Comboni Mission published his Concise grammar outline of the Bongo language.

== Bongo ethnic sculpture ==
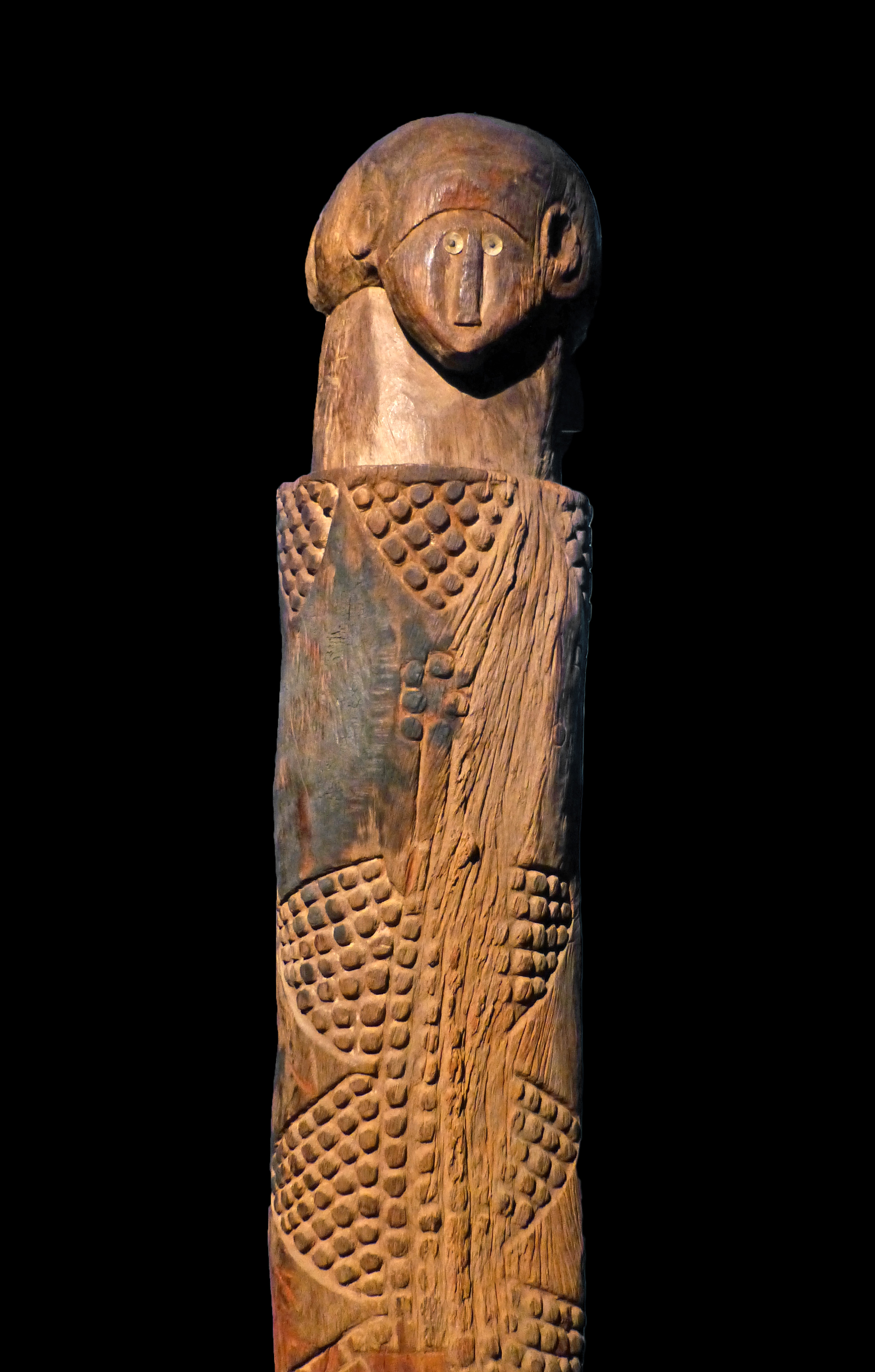
Bongo grave post at the Musée du quai Branly in Paris, France

The African Art collection of the Pacific Lutheran University in Washington State in the US holds a rare wooden Bongo grave post in the shape of a male figure. Such sculptures and their cultural use were described by Stefano Santandrea after his extended stay with the Bongo community in the mid-1960s.

Further, the catalogue "Bongo - Monumental statuary from Southern Sudan" presents pictures and art historical descriptions of a number of life-size statues. These were erected at the graves of important members of the Bongo communities and constitute a specific artistic tradition of this ethnic group. Starting in the 1970s, these sculptures have been collected by European travellers and were later sold to museums or private collections in Europe and other Western countries. One of these grave posts, measuring 240 cm in height, is exhibited in the section of African artefacts at the Musée du quai Branly in Paris.

In August 2018, the Metropolitan Museum of Art exhibited a commemorative male sculpture of the late 19th century in its section of African Arts. According to Christian Duponcheel, the person who had collected the work in southern Sudan, this sculpture had been placed "since before 1914 in a market in the town of Tonj where commercial transactions between Bongo and Nuer populations took place. There, it was said to help keep trade relations harmonious."
