= Fer language =

Central Sudanic language of the CAR

Fer
- Kara of Birao
- Native to: Central African Republic
- Region: Birao
- Native speakers: (4,800 cited 1996)
- Language family: Nilo-Saharan?: Central Sudanic; Bongo–Bagirmi; Bagirmi?; Fer

Language codes
- ISO 639-3: kah
- Glottolog: kara1482
- ELP: Kara

The Fer language, also Dam Fer or Fertit, one of several languages called Kara ("Kara of Birao"), is a Central Sudanic language spoken by some five thousand people in the northern Central African Republic near the Sudanese and Chadian borders, in the region known as Dar Runga.

While the Ethnologue leaves it unclassified, it appears to be a Bongo–Bagirmi language within the Central Sudanic family (Lionel Bender, Pascal Boyeldieu); Roger Blench classifies "Fer" as Bagirmi, but "Kara of Birao" as one of the related Kara languages.
