= Vale language =

Central Sudanic language of the CAR

Vale
- Native to: Central African Republic
- Native speakers: (5,400 cited 1996)
- Language family: Nilo-Saharan?: Central Sudanic; Bongo–Bagirmi; Ruto–Vale; Vale
- Dialects: Vale; Tana

Language codes
- ISO 639-3: vae
- Glottolog: vale1250

Vale is a minor Central Sudanic language of the Central African Republic, spoken in and to the west of the town of Batangafo. Tana (Tele) dialect is divergent and may be a distinct language.
