= Beli language (South Sudan) =

Central Sudanic language spoken in South Sudan

´Bëlï
- Jur 'Bëlï
- Native to: South Sudan
- Native speakers: 65,000 (2009)
- Language family: Nilo-Saharan?: Central Sudanic; Bongo–Bagirmi; Bongo–Baka; ´Bëlï

Language codes
- ISO 639-3: blm
- Glottolog: beli1257
- ELP: Beli (Sudan)
- Beli is classified as Definitely Endangered by the UNESCO Atlas of the World's Languages in Danger.

´Bëlï, or Jur Beli, is a Central Sudanic language spoken by the Beli and Sopi people of South Sudan. The Beli people are mainly found in South Sudan, a region southeast of Rumbek. The language is considered as endangered, and it is mostly spoken by the older generation.

However, it has three dialects and variations that are specific to different regions and communities. The language has a complex grammatical structure, with a rich system of prefixes that are used to indicate various grammatical features, such as, mood, and aspect.

Despite the lack of written material and limited use, Jur Beli is an important language for the Beli people, as it is an essential part of their cultural identity. The language serves as an important means of communication within the community, and it is used to transmit cultural knowledge and traditions from one generation to the next.

== Brief description about the Jur Beli people ==
The Jur (Beli & Modo) people, a group of over "100,000" (according to a source found online) individuals divided into two distinct geographic groups: Beli and Modo. The Beli live in the area extending from Bahr Gel to Wulu and Billing, while the Modo live in Mvolo, Bogri, Woko, and Bahr Girindi near Yirol. The area is characterized by flat plains with granitoid rocks and has a rich savannah in the east and tropical equatoria in the west, which allows for extensive agricultural activities. The Jur (Beli & Modo) are sedentary agriculturalists who practice shifting cultivation and raise crops such as sorghum, millet, beans, cassava, groundnuts, and simsim (Sesame). They also engage in hunting, fishing, and beekeeping. The main economic potential of the area is timber, honey, and shea oil. The Jur (Beli & Modo) believe they came from the Central African Republic and have a language that belongs to the central Sudanic group of languages but is linguistically similar to the Baka/Bongo group. Their society is organized into kinships, clans, and families and has elaborate customs and traditions. Marriage customs include respect for in-laws and paying a dowry, which is marked by the groom working in the in-laws' gardens and building a house for them.

== Geographic distribution ==
Jur Beli is a Nilo-Saharan language of western central Sudan in the Bongo-Baka group. In South Sudan, a region southeast of Rumbek is home to 65,000 Jur Beli speakers (Lewis et al. 2013).

== Alphabets ==
Orthography symbol	IPA symbol
A a	a
Ä ä	a
B b	b
´B ´b	ɓ
C c	c
D d	d̪
´D ´d	ɗ
E e	ɛ
Ë ë	e
Gg	g
Gb gb	ɡ͡b
H h	h
I i	i
Ï ï	i
J j	ɟ
´J ´j	ʄ
K k	k
Kp kp	k͡p
L l	l
M m	m
Mb mb	ᵐb
N n	n
Nd nd	ⁿd
Ng ng	ᵑg
Nj nj	ᶮɟ
Ny ny	ɲ
Ŋ ŋ	ŋ
Ŋb ŋb	ᵑ͡ᵐg͡b
Ŋm ŋm	ŋ͡m
O o	ʊ
Ͻ ɔ	ɔ
P p	p
R r	ɾ
T t	t̪
U u	u
W w	w
Y y	y

== Classification and dialects ==
According to Persson, there are three dialects of the Jur Beli language: Wulu, Bahri Girinti, and Sopi (Persson 1997:31–32).

In the diagram shown below is the language group of Jur Beli

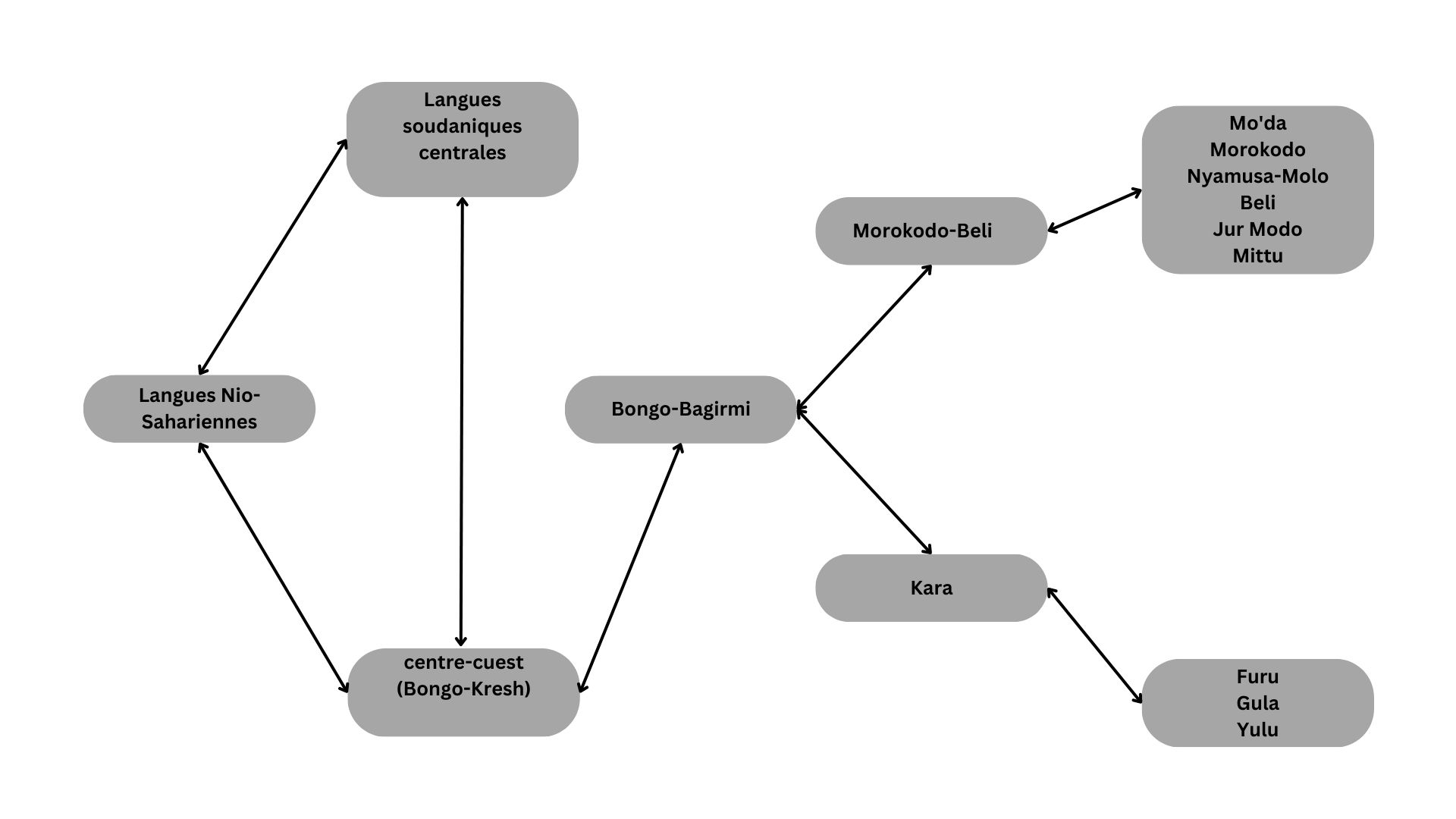

== Numbers ==
Listed below are the numbers from 1 to 10.

Numbers in Jur Beli	Translation in English
kɔtɔ	One
yo	Two
Mota	Three
hɔ	Four
Muyï	Five
Munötö	Six
Mïnïu	Seven
Mïnïmutä	Eight
miniyɔ	Nine
kii	Ten

== Phonology ==
=== Consonants ===
In the Jur Beli language, 28 distinct consonant phonemes have been identified, which include voiceless and voiced stops, nasals, Prenasalised stops, Fricative implosives, and approximants. These phonemes can be found in various positions within words and play an important role in the syllable structure of the language. (Reference: Post, D. G. (2014). A Grammar of Jur Beli: A Western Nilotic Language of South Sudan. SIL International.)

Consonant phonemes
		Labial	Dental	Palatal	Velar	Labiovelar	Glottal
Nasal		m	n	ɲ	ŋ	ŋ͡m	
Plosive	voiceless	p	t̪	c	k	k͡p	
Plosive	voiced	b	d̪	ɟ	g	͡gb	
Plosive	prenasalised	ᵐb	ⁿd	ᶮɟ	ᵑg	ᵑ͡ᵐg͡b	
Plosive	implosive	ɓ	ɗ	ʄ			
Approximant			ɾ, l	j		w	
Fricative							h

In the Jur Beli language, it is typical for consonant phonemes to occur at the beginning of syllables, while vowel phonemes occur at the end. This means that words in Jur Beli language are typically made up of a sequence of syllables, each beginning with a consonant and ending with a vowel.

It's worth noting that this is a general pattern in the Jur Beli language, but there may be exceptions to this rule.

=== Vowels ===
According to Stirtz (2014), 'Bëlï has nine vowel phonemes that can be divided into [+/- ATR] sets. The vowel [ə] is an allophone that does not occur in roots without other [+ATR] vowels:

[-ATR]	[+ATR]
ɪ	i
ʊ	u
ɛ	e
ɔ	o
a	(ə)

== Morphology ==
Morphology refers to the study of how words are formed and structured in the language.

== Noun ==
In the Jur Beli language, nouns are words that refer to people, places, things, or ideas. Nouns can be singular or plural, they are the words that name the entities, the subjects, or the objects of the sentence.

One type of noun is singular. A noun can have multiple forms, or plural. Ya can be used to indicate the plural form. Example of noun in singular and plural form in a sentence.

1. Anji ̱ ha ni. They saw a cow. (Singular)
2. Anji ̱ ha ya ni. They saw cows. (Plural)

== Pronouns ==
A pronoun is a word that is used in place of a noun or noun phrase. Subject completive, subject incompletive, object, and possessor pronouns are the four categories of pronouns in Jur Beli

Subject completive pronouns do actions that have finished. Subject incompletive pronouns do actions that have not finished.". Examples are shown in the table below.

Subject completive Subject incompletive	
Kidi a´jaa ´dɔ, ne ka mbe	If he or she finds something. He or she will fight.
Kidi yï ´jaa ´dɔ, yï ka mbe	If you (sing.) find something, you will fight.
Kidi mo ´jaa ´dɔ, ma ka mbe	If I find something, I will fight.
Kidi a´jaa ´dɔ ni, mene ka mbe	If they find something, they will fight
Kidi je ´jaa ´dɔ, je ka mbe	If we find something, we will fight.
Kidi ye ´jaa ´dɔ, ye ka mbe	If you (plural) find something, you will fight.

"In the third sentence on the left above, mo ꞌIꞌ does the completive or finished action ꞌjaa̱ ꞌfindꞌ and ma ꞌIꞌ does the incompletive or not finished action ka ̱ mbe ̱ ꞌwill fightꞌ"

Object pronouns receive the action. In the sentences on the left below, ma ꞌmeꞌ receives the action nji ̱ꞌsaw`

Object pronouns	Translation
Yikölu nji je.	People saw us
Yikölu nji mene.	People saw them.
Yikölu nji ye (plural).	People saw you (plural).
Yikölu nji yï.	People saw you (sing.).
Yikölu nji ne.	People saw him/her.
Yikölu nji ma.	People saw me.

Possessor pronouns mean to own or possess something. In the sentences below, gi ꞌyouꞌ are the owner of kɔ ꞌeyesꞌ."

Possessor Pronouns	Translations
Yikölu nji kɔ mee.	People saw their eyes.
Yikölu nji kɔ lee.	People saw our eyes.
Yikölu nji kɔ ge (plural).	People saw your (plural) eyes.
Yikölu nji kɔ gi (sing.).	People saw your (sing.) eyes.
Yikölu nji kɔ ma.	People saw my eyes.
Yikölu nji kɔ moo.	People saw his/her eyes.

== Demonstratives ==
Demonstratives indicate or portray a noun. A demonstrative is usually used after the noun it refers to.

(1) The demonstrative na "this": "Yïkölu na ka ̱ yi. This person is coming".

The demonstrative na identifies the approaching yikölu "person".

Singular Demonstratives	Translations
Yikölu nda	That person
Yikölu ndölïyö	That far person
Yikölu te	That known person
Yikölu na	This person

(2) The plural demonstrative word ndiya is put before the demonstrative na when pointing to multiple nouns.

"Anji ̱ yïkölu ndiya na ni. They saw these people".

The plural demonstrative ndiya in the table below indicates that the noun yikölu, "people," is plural.

Plural Demonstratives	Translations
Yikölu ndiya nda	Those people
Yikölu ndiya ndölïyö	Those far people
Yikölu ndiya te	Those known people
Yikölu ndiya na	These people

== Reflexives ==
A reflexive pronoun is a type of pronoun that is used when the subject and the object of a sentence are the same. It "reflects" to the subject. The reflexives are listed below.

Reflexives	Translations
Ngo mee	Themselves
Ngo lee	Ourselves
Ngo ge	Yourselves
Ngo gi	Yourself
Ngo moo	Himself/ herself
Ngo ma	Myself

To make a possessor pronoun reflexive, the word "body" (ngo) is used before it. When -ngo is reflexive, it is joined to the word before it. Both a preposition and a verb can be followed by the prefix "-ngo." The possessive pronoun after -ngo is usually distinct.

== Tone ==
e refers to the pitch of the voice used to produce a sound, and it is used to convey meaning. In languages like Jur Beli, tone is used to distinguish between words that would otherwise be identical in terms of their sound.

Aa	Ää
ŋba H [‾] then (con)	mänyä L, L [ ̶ ˎ ] gazelle
Ma H [‾] I (pron	mbä L [ ˎ ] wine
Mba H [‾] Breast	Ŋbä L [ ˎ ] guest, visitor
Manya H, M [‾ ̶ ] dura	mä L [ ˎ ] mother

H demonstrate high tone, M demonstrate medium tone, and L demonstrate low tone.

== Conjunctions (connectors) ==
A conjunction is a word that joins two or more sentences, clauses, or words. It can be used to link similar words together, such as when "and" is used to link two nouns, or it can be used to link clauses or phrases.

Dependent clause conjunctions before main clauses: Subordinating conjunctions are nouns that link a dependent sentence to an independent clause, usually referred to as the main clause. The context of the dependent clause is provided by the main clause because it is not a complete sentence on its own. Example:

Nate ha ndiya te teg̱̈ e ri mee ŋba, naka moŋa̱ŋi mondo̱ kpe ni	When those cows heard their names, then they began jumping a lot

This "nate" sentence, which repeats information, slows down the narrative to demonstrate the relevance of what follows next.

Main clause conjunctions: The words that join main clauses or independent clauses together are known as main clause conjunctions. They serve as a joining device and signal that the clauses are of equal weight. For instance:

Kidi ji nji kɔ ma, aneṉgo ge-je ni-ye	If anyone looks into my eyes, that will be the end of us with you.

A dependent clause is introduced by the connector kidi "if" before the action of the subsequent main clause. Kidi begins a clause with fresh information rather than reiterating previously stated material. A condition or the first of two acts in a two-step sequence can constitute the new information.

Dependent clause conjunctions after main clauses: The word that tells a reason behind previous clause. For example:

Ka gɔmo nda jɔ ̱ ga-lemi moo, ka ꞌdɔ, bonɔ ne maa̱ yi ̱ ni-mini, ka ne ye.̱	That man told his sister and asked so that she went and brought water, and he drank

The connector "bonɔ" is used to introduce a clause that explains the reason or purpose for the main clause that precedes it. It serves to indicate the motivation behind the action described in the previous clause. The clause introduced by "bonɔ" typically comes after the main clause and explains the why of the main clause action.

Relative clause connectors inside main clauses: Relative clauses are clauses that modify a noun or pronoun and are introduced by a relative pronoun. They provide additional information about the noun or pronoun and are usually set off by commas. They can be used within a main clause to give more information about the noun or pronoun that the main clause is talking about.

Bii, na dɔhayi na ka ̱ Rombeki, teṉ e ga-Joŋo no ne ndawa.	The place, that this land be called Rumbek, remains to the Dinka.

The connector "na" is used to introduce a clause that helps to specify or clarify a noun or pronoun that came before the clause. It limits the possible options of the noun or pronoun, making it more specific. It is often used to give more details about the noun or pronoun in the previous clause.

Further examples on conjunctions in the table below:

Relative Clause Connectors (inside main Clauses)
te	(known) that, where, which, who
na	(identifying) that, where, which, who
bo	(new action or information) that, where, which, who

Main Clause (Connectors)	Translation
Kambeti	Instead, but
Naka	Then, so
Ka	And, Then
Ko	And
di bɔnda	From, there
Ŋba	As a result, then

Dependent Clause Connectors (Before Main Clauses)	Translations
ä´dö	had been
kidi	If, when
nate	When
kodi	If, when

== Prepositions ==
The use of prepositions in a phrase helps the reader understand how a noun or pronoun relates to other words. They show where the noun or pronoun is in relation to other words in the phrase as well as the noun or pronoun's position in time or space. In Jur Beli language nouns could be used as prepositions, however prepositions could be distinguished from nouns through their tones. Examples of prepositions with tones included in the table below.

Preposition	Tone	Translation
dimi-	L; M [_-]	with, from
dingo-	L; M [_-]	about
kɔ-	M [-]	between
ro-	M [-]	ahead
Ngo-	H [‾]	at
Mini-	L; H [_-]	with, in
Gbobati-	M; M; M; [---]	after
hɔlɔ	H; M	under
di-	L [̗̖]	from

H indicates high tone, M demonstrate medium tone, and L demonstrate low tone in the table above.

Examples of nouns that have the meaning of prepositions. Some nouns can have the meaning of prepositions. When they are used as prepositions as opposed to when they are nouns, the tone is different.

Nouns	Tones	Translations	Nouns used as prepositions	Tones	Translations
ro	L [̗̖]	Back	ro	[-] M	on, towards
kɔ	L [̗̖]	Eye	kɔ	[-] M	into
Kpa	L [̗̖]	Mouth	Kpa	[-] M	to, at
dɔ	L [̗̖]	Head	dɔ	[-] M	over, at, on
´bɔ	L [̗̖]	Footprint	´bɔ	[-] M	for

M demonstrate medium tone, and L demonstrate low tone in the table above.

== Interrogatives ==
Interrogatives are words or phrases that are used to ask questions. They help to form questions. Here are examples of interrogatives in Jur Beli:

Jur Beli question words	English translation
Wayi	What
Diindo	How
Kola	When
´bala	Where
Ala	Who, whom, which
bonɔ	why
Ndiya	Question with plural subject or object

Question words in sentences and translations:

Jur Beli	English
Yikolu dö̱ gbeti bonɔ?	Person beat a child, why?
Yikolu dö̱ wayi?	Person beat what?
Yikolu dö̱ gbeti ꞌbala?	Person beat a child where?
Yikolu dö̱ wayi?	Person beat what?
Yikolu dö̱ gbeti kola?	Person beat a child when?
Ala kodö̱ gbeti?	Who beat a child?

== Verbs ==
Words that express an action or a state of being are called verbs. A verb is often employed to show what the sentence's subject is doing or what is happening to it in a sentence. Listed below are examples of verbs in table Jur Beli language.

Type of verbs	Verbs in Beli language	Translations
Motions	Maa tɔ	go leave
States	mɔɔ ndee	be alive be old
Equivalent sign	ka	Is, be
Actions	jɔ ye	say drink

Verbs can have various forms and these forms can be used in different ways in a sentence. The forms can include additional words or prefixes that are added to the base form of the verb. Examples of this include the use of "ka" – "is or be" along with the verb or prefixes like "a-" "he."

Below are verb forms of le – "dig" in the table (pg 32) book1:

Verb forms	Examples	Translations
Dependent	Mäŋö mo piya kole go	Woman goes out in order to dig a hole
Future	Mäŋö ti le go	Woman will surely dig a hole
Command	Mäŋö le go!	Woman dig a hole!
Continuous	Mäŋö ka le	Woman is digging a hole
Verbal noun	Mäŋö ka mole go moo	Woman digs a hole
Repetitive	Mäŋö lele go	Woman digs holes several times
Incompletive	Mäŋö le go	Woman will dig a hole / Woman dug a hole

== Adjectives ==
Adjectives can be used to describe the quantity, quality, or state of the noun or pronoun.

Below are three adjectives listed:

Jur Beli Adejctives	English translation
gbörö	selfish
mɔri	rich
kpili	small, short

Further examples of singular and plural adjectives in table below:

Singular Adjectives	Translations	Plural Adjectives	Translations
yikölu kpili	Short person	yikölu kpili ya	Small people
yikölu mɔri	Rich person	yikölu mɔri ya	Rich people

An adjective that describes a noun that has not yet been specifically identified is referred to as an indefinite adjective.

"tɔ" - certain, any, other is an example of an indefinite Adjective. Additionally, is an example of how the term tɔ can be used as singular and plural indefinite adjective as shown in table below:

Plural Indefinite	Translation
yikölu tɔ	a particular person
Singular Indefinite	Translation
yikölu tɔ ya	Particular people

== Arrangement of words within a clause ==
A clause is a grammatical structure that typically contains a subject and a verb. It expresses a complete thought and can function as a sentence on its own. A clause typically has a subject, which is the noun or pronoun that performs the action described by the verb.

Common order of parts of a clause →

Subject – Verb – Object – Adverb – Prepositional phrase.

In this clause the subject "yïkölu" (person) is performing the action "amaa̱" (went)

Yikolu amaa̱ ꞌbɔnda.	Person went there

In this clause, the object "mäŋö" (woman) is the receiver of the action "aꞌjaa̱" (found). The action is done to or directed at "mäŋö". The subject and the object of the clause are the two main elements that indicate what the action is and who is doing it and who is affected by it.

Yikolu aꞌjaa̱ maŋo.	Person found a woman.

In this clause, the adverb "jënä" (today) provides information about when the action "amaa̱" (happened) occurred. Adverbs and prepositions in a clause can give additional information about the verb, such as the time, place, reason, or way the action is performed.

Yikolu amaa̱ ꞌjenä ga-mäŋö	Person went to the woman today.
