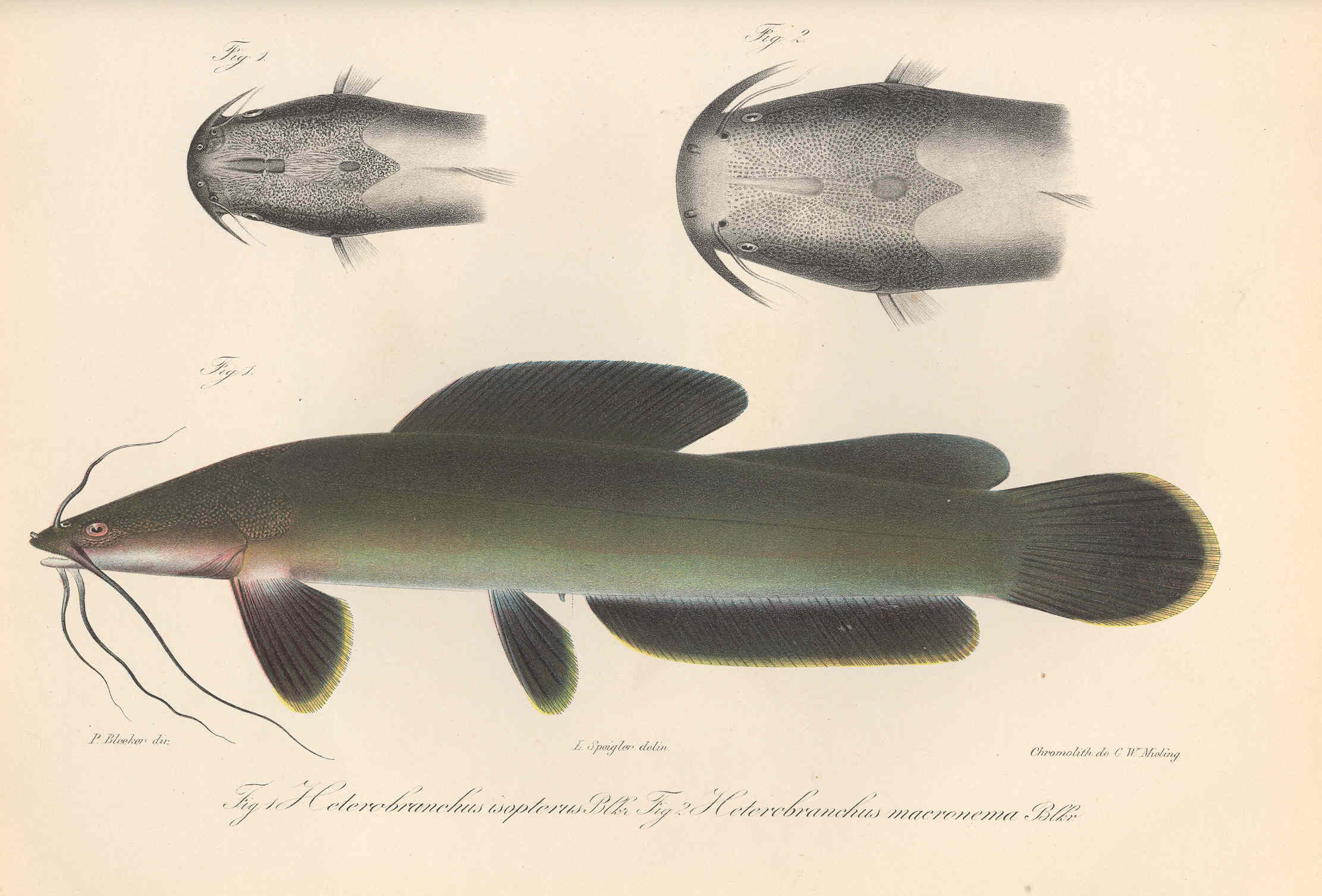
- FMIB 45845 Heterobranchus macronema

Conservation status
- Least Concern (IUCN 3.1)

Scientific classification
- Domain: Eukaryota
- Kingdom: Animalia
- Phylum: Chordata
- Class: Actinopterygii
- Order: Siluriformes
- Family: Clariidae
- Genus: Heterobranchus
- Species: H. isopterus

Binomial name
- Heterobranchus isopterus Bleeker, 1863

= Heterobranchus isopterus =

Species of fish

Heterobranchus isopterus is a species of airbreathing catfish found in West Africa.
