= Heterobranchus boulengeri =

Scientific classification
- Kingdom: Animalia
- Phylum: Chordata
- Class: Actinopterygii
- Order: Siluriformes
- Family: Clariidae
- Genus: Heterobranchus
- Species: H. boulengeri

Binomial name
- Heterobranchus boulengeri Pellegrin, 1922

Species of fish

Heterobranchus boulengeri is a species of airbreathing catfish found in the Democratic Republic of the Congo, Zambia and Zimbabwe. It is found in Lake Mweru, the Lukonzolwa River and the upper Congo River.

== Etymology ==
The fish is named in honor of ichthyologist-herpetologist George A. Boulenger (1858-1937), of the British Museum (Natural History), who had described many of the fishes from Central Africa and the Congo River system.

== Description ==
Heterobranchus boulengeri has short barbels. Its gill arches extend anteriorly. This species can reach 64.0 cm (25.2 inches) TL in length.

== Habitat ==
Heterobranchus boulengeri is found in tropical freshwater rivers and lakes. It is demersal, preferring the bottom of these bodies of water.
