= Bagirmi languages =

Language

Bagirmi
- Geographic distribution: Chad
- Linguistic classification: Nilo-Saharan?: Central Sudanic; Bongo–Bagirmi; Bagirmi

Language codes
- ISO 639-3: –
- Glottolog: bagi1248

The Bagirmi languages comprise half a dozen languages spoken in southern Chad. They are members of the Central Sudanic language family.

The most populous Bagirmi language is Naba, spoken by the Bilala, Kuka, and Medogo, who together number a quarter million. The languages are:

Barma (Bagirmi proper), Naba, Kenga, Fer, Beraku, Disa

Ethnologue lists a couple more (Jaya, Morom) between Kenga and Naba, and Gula (Sara Gula) further south, next to Sar.
