= Vale languages =

Vale
- Ruto–Vale
- Geographic distribution: CAR, Chad
- Linguistic classification: Nilo-Saharan?: Central Sudanic; Bongo–Bagirmi; Vale
- Subdivisions: Ruto; Vale

Language codes
- ISO 639-3: –
- Glottolog: ndug1243

The Vale languages, or Ruto–Vale, comprise a small number of languages spoken by a few tens of thousands of people in the Central African Republic and perhaps Chad. They are members of the Central Sudanic language family.

The most populous Vale language is Ruto (Lutos), spoken by twenty thousand people. The other clearly related language is Vale (with its Tana variety perhaps a third).
