= Berakou language =

Extinct Bongo–Bagirmi language of Chad

Berakou
- Babalia, Beraku, Bubalia
- Native to: Chad
- Ethnicity: Babalia people
- Extinct: 2 speakers reported in 1995
- Language family: Nilo-Saharan?: Central Sudanic; Bongo–Bagirmi; Bagirmi; Berakou

Language codes
- ISO 639-3: bxv
- Glottolog: bera1261
- ELP: Berakou

Berakou is an extinct Bongo–Bagirmi language of Chad. Speakers have shifted to Chadian Arabic or various Kotoko languages. According to the UNESCO Atlas of the World's Languages in Danger, the Berakou language has been extinct since the 1950s.
