= Furu language =

Central Sudanic language of DR Congo

Furu
- Bagero
- Native to: Democratic Republic of the Congo
- Native speakers: (16,000 cited 1984–1996)
- Language family: Nilo-Saharan?: Central Sudanic; Bongo–Bagirmi; Kara; Furu

Language codes
- ISO 639-3: fuu
- Glottolog: furu1242

Furu is a Central Sudanic language of the Democratic Republic of the Congo. Glottolog has it as one of the Kara languages, in line with recent literature, while Blench (2012) follows older lit in listing it as a Kresh language.

== Bibliography ==
- Blench (2000 ms)
