= Gula language (Chad) =

Bongo–Bagirmi language spoken in Chad

Gula
- Sara Gula
- Native to: Chad
- Native speakers: (10,300 cited 2000)
- Language family: Nilo-Saharan?: Central Sudanic; Bongo–Bagirmi; Bagirmi; Gula
- Dialects: Kofoy; Malé; Moufa; Souka; Toussa
- Writing system: Latin

Language codes
- ISO 639-3: glu
- Glottolog: gula1269

Gula (Sara Gula) is a Bongo–Bagirmi language of Chad.
