= Ngam language =

Sara language spoken in Central Africa

Ngam
- Sara Ngam
- Native to: Chad, Central African Republic
- Native speakers: (61,000 cited 1993–1996)
- Language family: Nilo-Saharan?: Central Sudanic; Bongo–Bagirmi; Sara languages; East; Ngam

Language codes
- ISO 639-3: nmc
- Glottolog: ngam1269

Ngam, or Sara Ngam, is a Bongo–Bagirmi language of Chad and the Central African Republic.

== Examples ==
- Sú àl̄ dò̰ó̰ bə̄ kà̰ŗ̄ɓày ᵼ̀sō-nìí jī Tùbòjēmgᵼ̄ tᵼ́. - He mounts (into a tree), but a toad falls into the hands of Toubojemgué.
- J-àw̄ ndò̰ kānjᵼ̄-á bā-á. - We went fishing on the river.
- ń-dòó dá, ā í-ɗāhā ɗí tā? - And now what are you going to do?
- Wòjᵼ̀ ngán gᵼ̄ sīrí, àdᵼ̄ ngán kᵼ́ dìngà ??gᵼ̄ ??ì mᵼ̀tá, bə̄ kᵼ́ dḭ̀yá̰ gᵼ̄ ì sɔ́. - He has seven children, three boys and four girls.
- Mbɔ̀ŗ̄ nᵼ̀ngà yā̰-í ngāl ànī, à ᵼ̀ndà yḛ̄tᵼ̄ gᵼ̄ ᵼ̀gà dɔ̀-í tᵼ́. - If the handle of your spear is long, it will strike the wasps that will sting you.
- ó̰-ō̰, ḿ-gèŗ̄ àĺ tó̰ò̰. - No, I do not understand yet.
- Yèl̄ gᵼ̄ ní ɗèē wɔ̀tᵼ̄-n̄ dɔ̀-ǹ tᵼ́ - The birds arrive above his head.
