= Samo language =

Samo language may refer to:

- Samo language (Burkina)
- Samo language (New Guinea)
