= Lisi people =

The Lisi people are three closely associated Chadian ethnic groups living in the same geographical area, represented by the Batha and Chari-Baguirmi prefectures: the Bilala (136,000), the Kuka (76,000) and the Medogo (19,000).

The Lisi are mainly farmers growing crops such as sorghum, millet, cotton and manioc; herding is occasionally associated with farming. They live in compact villages, each of which is governed by a chief, that settles local disputes, a duty he discharges with the help of the village's elders. Polygamy is quite common, but the husband must guarantee a separate house for every wife. The first wife retains a privileged status over the others.

In religion they are all Muslim, and represent the people who were part of the Yao Sultanate in pre-colonial Chad. The sultanate was founded by the Bulala in the 15th century, conquering the Kuka, who successively passed them their language. For this they all now speak the same language, known as Naba language.
