= Lutos language =

Central Sudanic language of CAR and Chad

Lutos
- Ruto
- Native to: Central African Republic, Chad
- Native speakers: (19,000 cited 1993–1996)
- Language family: Nilo-Saharan?: Central Sudanic; Bongo–Bagirmi; Vale; Lutos
- Dialects: Ruto; Nduka

Language codes
- ISO 639-3: ndy
- Glottolog: luto1241

Lutos (Ruto) is a Central Sudanic language of CAR and Chad. Two distinctive dialects are Lutos/Ruto proper and Nduka.

== Phonology ==
Consonants
		Labial	Alveolar	Retroflex	Palatal	Velar	Labiovelar	Glottal
Plosive	oral	p b	t d			k g	kp gb	
Plosive	nasal	ᵐb	ⁿd			ᵑg	ᵑᵐgb	
Implosive		ɓ	ɗ					
Fricative	oral	f v	s z					h
Fricative	nasal	ᵐv	ⁿz					
Nasal		m	n		ɲ			
Approximant		w	r, l	ɽ	j			

- /s/ can sometimes be heard as [ʃ] syllable-finally.

Vowels
	Front	Central	Back
High	i iː		u uː ũ ũː
Mid-high	e ẽ	ə	o oː õ õː
Mid-low	ɛ		ɔ ɔː ɔ̃ ɔ̃ː
Low		a aː ã ãː	

Additionally, there exists the diphthong /ua/. It cannot be lengthened nor nasalised.

Lutos has three tones: high, mid, low.
