= Sinyar language =

Central Sudanic language spoken in Chad

Sinyar
- Shemya
- Native to: Chad
- Ethnicity: Sinyar
- Native speakers: 33,000 (2023)
- Language family: Nilo-Saharan?: Central Sudanic?; Bongo-Bagirmi?; Sinyar

Language codes
- ISO 639-3: sys
- Glottolog: siny1243

Linguistic map of the non-Arab peoples of Darfur.

Shemya (tàar ʃàmɲà) is the language of the Sinyar people. It is traditionally viewed as Central Sudanic language spoken in Chad and formerly in Darfur, Sudan. It is variously spelled Shamya, Shamyan, Shemya, Sinya, and known as Symiarta, Taar Shamyan, Zimirra.

The language is spoken in Goz Beïda, Chad and Foro Boranga, Sudan. There are two level tones and downstepped low tones. Word order is SVO.

Dimmendaal classifies it as a language isolate, whereas Blench groups it with Formona.

Doornbos records 18 Sinyar clans. The Kijaar clan, located close to the Kujargé, likely intermarried with the Kujargé.

== Lexicon ==
Sinyar numerals from Boyeldieu (2013):

Numerals

1	kàllà
2	róò
3	mùʈʈà
4	ùssà
5	mòy
6	mìccà
7	mòorsò
8	màartà
9	mànɖéy
10	ʈìyà

Sinyar appears to have a Bongo–Bagirmi superstratum and a non-Bongo–Bagirmi substratum. Some lexical items in Sinyar have cognates in Bongo–Bagirmi languages (particularly the neighboring Yulu-Gula group), while others do not.

Sinyar lexical items without Bongo-Bagirmi cognates

Gloss	Sinyar
bee, honey	sìmír
black	kìttì
buffalo	kàjìbìl
come	uwe / weeɲ
deep	cuggol
dry	arfa
ear	ùrà
leaf	ìi
elephant	kártí
foot	gwàar
leg	kàffà
grass	kàanà
head	sùɓó
hunger	mùsù
kill	wii
long	ʃùggòl
moon	kwànjà
neck	kwàalà
new	sìyèer
night	dìkìttì
nose	ɲàrmá
person	cé / céè; ƒítì
place	dì
placenta	kàɗù
plait, to	urɓa / urmba
rain, to	weeri (-ooru)
red	abbal
rope	kwàár
smoke	úʃú
snake	nɖùbbòl
steal	maggal / mangal
stone, grindstone	gòl
wet	wicce (-ucce)

Sinyar lexical items with Bongo-Bagirmi cognates

Gloss	Sinyar
beget	wiʄe / wiɲe
bird	wèl
breast	mbàár
die	wille
dog	ɓìsì
drink	iya
eat	wiɲ
eye	kwòm
fire	fòɗù
fish	kwùnjó
grease, oil	ìbì
horn	kòjjù
hot	uŋŋa
I	màá
know	ugol / ungol
make a pot	uɓa / umba
meat	ìjjà
mouth	tàar
name	èerè
ox, cow	ìccà
seed	kùfò
sharp	affa
skin	ànnà
seep	suɗo / sunjo
three	mùʈʈà
tree	kàggá
two	róò
who?	ɗèe-
goat	fìyà
gruel, porridge	fìryà
hair	fìí
warthog	fòɗú
sun	dkàjjà
water, thirst	kùjá
urine	wèrjí
tie, to	wirja / wirnja

== Pronouns ==
Sinyar pronouns:

Sinyar pronouns

Gloss	Sinyar
1S	màalé, (màá)
2S	ìllé
3S	nàalé, (nàá)
1P.du	cìngé
1P.ex?	cìyé
1P.in	cèesá
2P?	sìngé; sèesá
3P	nìngé
