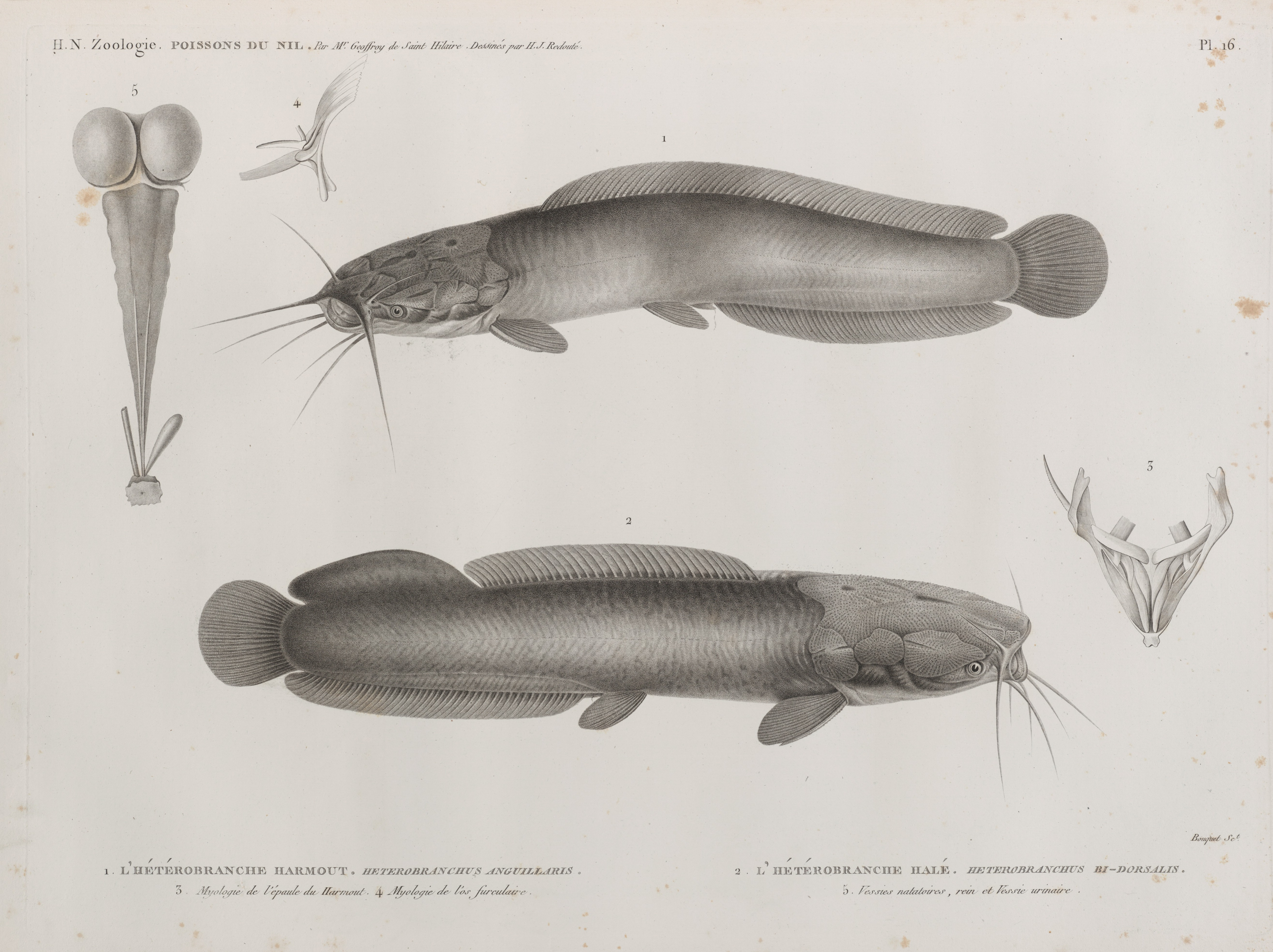

Conservation status
- Least Concern (IUCN 3.1)

Scientific classification
- Domain: Eukaryota
- Kingdom: Animalia
- Phylum: Chordata
- Class: Actinopterygii
- Order: Siluriformes
- Family: Clariidae
- Genus: Heterobranchus
- Species: H. bidorsalis

Binomial name
- Heterobranchus bidorsalis É. Geoffroy Saint-Hilaire, 1809

Synonyms
- Heterobranchus geoffroyi Valenciennes, 1840; Heterobranchus senegalensis Valenciennes, 1840; Heterobranchus intermedius Günther, 1864

= Heterobranchus bidorsalis =

Species of fish

Heterobranchus bidorsalis, the African catfish or eel-like fattyfin catfish, is an airbreathing catfish found in Africa. It is closely related to the vundu catfish, which is well known among fishermen.

== Description ==
The head of Heterobranchus bidorsalis is shaped like an oval and has a rectangular dorsum. The snout is round and the eyes are lateral. The frontal fontanelle is long and narrow while the occipital fontanelle is relatively long and is shaped like an oval. The postorbital bones are completely united. The suprabranchial organ is well developed. The pectoral spine is smooth. The body and fins may have spots. It can reach a length of 150 cm (59 in) TL. The maximum recorded weight for this species is 30.0 kg. The species has 40-46 dorsal (in the back) soft rays, 49-58 anal soft rays, and 62-63 vertebrate.

== Relationship to humans ==
This fish is commercially fished for human consumption.

== Habitat and distribution ==
This catfish is a demersal fish and inhabits freshwater. It lives in waters of 22.0–28.0 °C (71.6–82.4 °F). It is found widely in the northern half of Africa between Senegal and Ethiopia, as well as the Nile. It can be found in the Niger River, Gambia River, Senegal River, Baro River, Benue River, Volta River and Lake Chad.
