= Mbay language =

Central Sudanic language spoken in Central Africa

Mbay
- Sara Mbay
- Native to: Chad, Central African Republic
- Native speakers: (90,000 cited 1990–1996)
- Language family: Nilo-Saharan?: Central Sudanic; Bongo–Bagirmi; Sara languages; East; Mbay

Language codes
- ISO 639-3: myb
- Glottolog: mbay1241

Mbay, or Sara Mbay, is a Bongo–Bagirmi language of Chad and the Central African Republic.

It is reported that Mbay does not have independent personal pronouns. The meaning is largely carried out by subject, object, and possessive affixes attached to verbs, prepositions, and nouns. Other words, such as yá̰a̰ "thing", dèē "person", tàa "speech", and lòo "place" are used somewhat pronominally as something, somebody, something said, and somewhere.

== Pluralization ==
Mbay language has plural nouns just like most languages. Mbay languages pluralise nouns by using prefixes, for example, ƃa-na (child) is Ma-na (children) in Mbay language.

To pluralize nouns, these changes occur, also the root word stays the same.

Singular	Plural
Ƃa- na (child)	Ma-na( children)
Do-sɛ (man)	Ro-sɛ (men)
ɳga-ta (woman)	Ba-ta (women)
Ku-sum (elder)	Gu-sum (elders)
To-pu (Friend)	Ko-pu (Friends)

Its nouns are pluralised also by adding ''gӫ'', for example, dog= bίsө՛ to dogs=bίsө-gӫ.

In some cases the stems also changes, for example, owner= nge՝, owners to nge՝-a՛-gӫ

== Inflection ==
Through the addition of prefixes, suffixes, tone changes and auxiliary verbs, you are able to inflect tense, mood and aspect.

=== Tense ===
Past, present, past are marked by auxiliary words, particles or changes in verbal morphological sounds.

Example:

1. Present: I am eating = Ī sa
2. Past: I ate = Ī sà
3. Future: I will eat = Ī sā

=== Aspect ===
This is the nature of the action's completion or duration, whether the action is ongoing, completed, or habitual

1. Progressive aspect: I am eating = Ī sa
2. Perfective aspect: I have eaten = Ī sá
3. Habitual aspect: I eat regularly = Ī sā

=== Mood ===
Speaker's attitude towards the action. (Example. Commands, request, possibilities)

Imperative mood: It is used for commands; the verb root is used often without inflection. Example; Sa! = Eat!

Subjunctive mood: Used for wishes or hypothetical actions, it is marked by auxiliary particles.

For example, Ī sa wa = May I eat

Conditional mood: It is used for conditional statements and marked by particles. Se Ī sa = If I eat

== Verb and subject agreement ==
Verbs show agreement with their subject nouns through subject pronouns, prefixes or tonal patterns.

Example (the verb to eat):

1. I eat = Ī sa
2. He/she ate = ǹ sà
3. You ate = a sà

=== Noun class prefixes ===
If the subject is a noun the agreement may be implicit through noun class prefixes. This alignment is more apparent in noun-adjective agreements than verb agreements but the subject class influences the tone or auxiliary choice.

=== Number agreement ===
Verbs do not inflect for singular or plural directly, but subject pronouns or auxiliary particles may signal number.

Singular= Ī sa

Plural= Kò sa

=== Adjective agreement with head nouns ===
Noun class systems influence their form and agreement patterns which sometimes govern how adjectives agree with head nouns by class, number, and gender.

=== Descriptive adjectives ===
They explain size, shape, and colour, for example, big, red, small

Numerals: Functions to indicate quantity or rank, for example, one= kə́rā, two= jōó

Possessives adjectives: To indicate ownership, for example, my eye= kùm-ḿ, your hand= Jī-í

Adjective-noun Agreement: An agreement through infixes that corresponds to the noun class of the head noun. For example, nouns formed with /ngè/ literally meaning owner are a common example, màn̄g k̀̀̀̀̀ə́ ngè-ndān-ngōn = A pregnant cow

Position of adjectives: Adjectives usually follows the noun they modify. For example, big house= pɔ̀tɔ́ àjɛ́

Possessive adjectives: To indicate ownership, example my child

== Numbers ==
Number	Mbay term
1	kə́rā
2	jōó
3	mə̀tá
4	sɔ̄ɔ́
5	mḭ̄́ḭ
6	kə́-bɔ̀y-tə́
7	tènə̀-mə̀tá
8	jī-jōó
9	jī-kə́rā
10	kə̀lá

For numbers which are over ten, Mbay language adds up basic numerals to form higher numbers.

For instance, eleven might be expressed as "ten and one", though specific constructions would depend on Mbay's grammatical rules. for example, 11 is the addition of ten and one, kə̀lá à kə́rā , 12 is kə̀lá à jōó, and so on. /à/ is for /and/ in English, also it could also be written without the /à/, for example kə̀lá kə́rā, kə̀lá jōó.

Number	Mbay term
20	dɔ́-jōó
21	dɔ́-jōó-kə́rā
22	dɔ́-jōó-jōó
23	dɔ́-jōó-mə̀tá
24	dɔ́-jōó-sɔ̄ɔ́
25	dɔ́-jōó-mḭ̄́ḭ
26	dɔ́-jōó-kə́-bɔ̀y-tə́
27	dɔ́-jōó-tènə̀-mə̀tá
28	dɔ́-jōó-jī-jōó
29	dɔ́-jōó-jī-kə́rā

Thirty is the combination of three and ten, dɔ́-mə̀tá. So numbers from 31 to 39 use the same format as the numbers from 21 to 29, by combing the numbers together. For example 31 is dɔ́-mə̀tá-kə́rā. Forty is dɔ́-sɔ̄ɔ́-, 41 is dɔ́-sɔ̄ɔ́- kə́rā. Fifty is dɔ́-mḭ̄́ḭ, 60 is dɔ́-kə́-bɔ̀y-dètə́, 70 is dɔ́-tènə̀-mə̀tá, 80 is dɔ́-jī-jōó, 90 is dɔ́-jī-kə́rā-, 100 is ɓúu. (Page 114.and 115 Keegan)

== Word order ==
Mbay language's word order follows the subject-verb-object (SVO) structure, which is usual among many languages from Central Sudanic. The subject precedes the verb and the verb precedes the object SVO example, 1. Enock Opoku ɓògɵ̀ bèlō lò-ḿ, meaning, "Enock Opoku stole my bicycle.". 2. Ngōn sà mápà túu-be, meaning "The child ate all the bread eat". (Page 154. Keegan). In relative clauses, the basic order is preserved. Further, unlike in English, pronominal affixes that refer back to the head noun are omitted:

1. bīyā̰ ń bɔ́ɔ̄-ǹ ɓògɵ̀ kétɵ́ nò =The goat that his father robbed.
2. Ngōn ń bɔ́ɔ̄-á ndà-á nò =The boy whom his father hit.

There are substantial cases where the standard word order is altered by using constructions resulting in an embedded phrase or clauses in a position at the beginning of a sentence. This 'fronting. is most commonly done to give the fronted expression greater emphasis. (Page155. Keegan).

Word order with interrogative pronouns. Interrogative pronouns are commonly placed in the syntactic position of the noun phrase they are replacing; For example:

1. Tɔ̄ɔ- í í dí? = What is your name?
2. ɓògè kīnjá lò ná̰ā̰? = Whose chicken did he rob?

It is also common to place the interrogative pronoun in front of the sentence, where it is preceded by the verb /Ì/ = 'it is'. The sentence following is then introduced by the complementizer /há̰/ or /wáy/. Example;

1. Ì di way aw sukӫ-ú Ī-ndӫgo té wà? =What was it that you went to the market to buy?
2. Ì ná̴̰ā̰ há̰ Ī-ndá-á tàgɵ̀-bè wà = Who was it that you hit yesterday?

In cases of relative clauses, when an interrogative pronoun is external to a clause and placed in front of it, a resumptive pronominal affix occurs inside the clause.

The English translation for some of these sentences is at times difficult, for example, Ì dí wáy ūtē-n̄-èé nà̰ā̰ kújē-ú kɵ̀ ngán-ī-gē ndì-ī-mɔ̄kɵ̄-n̄ tītɵ̄-bè wà , meaning What is it that you are eating like that hidden away there in the house with your children. The translation fails to capture the fact that /ɗi/ 'what' is extracted from the most deeply embedded sentence.

Definite-noun-phase fronting: Any definite noun phrase, including direct objects, indirect objects, possessives, and objects of prepositions, can be placed at the front of the sentence for purposes of emphasis. For example

1. Tàa lò-á sùmbā kàdē òō-n̄ dɔ̀ màjè = His words are worth listening to well.
2. kɵ̀dē dá sumbā kàdē òō-n̄-á màjè = That elephant should be watched carefully.
3. kɔ̀n̄ n m-ndā-í yé ɗāa titē-bà̱ý i-ɗèē àí àdē ndùm wà? = How is it that you didn't come so that the portion I saved for you went bad?

In cases such as example 1, a translation in English is achieved using the passive voice, in example 3, on the other hand, a translation which indicates the fronting is more difficult, a more literal translation would be '' The portion that I saved for you, how is it that you didn't come and it went bad?''. Note that it is not possible to move an indefinite noun phrase to the front in this fashion, that is /kɵ̀dē dá sumbā kàdē òō-n̄-á màjè/, ''it is important that they see an elephant'' is not grammatical. As a result, a specifier, (for example /dá/, /nò/, /yé/, /ń-tèn/, etc) or a possessive always follows the fronted noun phrase. Greater levels of nesting, on the other hand, do not prevent frontal placements of a noun phrase with a conferential resumptive pronominal affix from occurring. For example

1. Kānjē dá nām-m èl-m̄ àn kè m̄-ndōgē = Fish is what my friend told me to buy
2. Kānjē dá nām-m èl-m̄ àn kè n-gee ke ǹ-ndōgē = Fish is what my friend told me that he wanted to buy

Fronted expression and then placing /ye/ at the end of the sentence: For example

Súu lā ndà ngōn-ǹ yé / Ngōn-á lā Súu nda-à yé = It was Súu who hit the child / It was his child that Súu hit.

The element of a noun phrase is the noun itself, the set of pronominal affixes marking the possessor, the noun plural suffix /-gē/, a specifier (article, demonstrative, etc), a prepositional phrase, a phrase introduced by /kə́/ and a relative clause. (Keegan, Page.144)

Example 1. Tábèl (kə́) kám kújé tə́ = The table is in the house.

Example 2. M-ã m̄-gée kə́ màje kòo-ń = I only want a good one.

Word order in Mbay language has an SVO pattern also, that is the subject+verb+object, their relation helps to give meaning to sentences a reader hears or reads. For example, I saw the child = Kofi-ōo ngōn. Kofi is the subject, saw-ōo, the child=ngōn.

=== Demostrative nouns ===
The order of demonstrative nouns that exists in Mbay language is the pronoun, which qualifies a noun and these are the ''This=ń-ndìn, That=ndìn and these= ndìn-ndìn''. It is supposed to be noted that the choice of the form of these demonstratives depends on the Mbay view of the position of the object. If the object is viewed as having been laid in its position (as a pencil on the table), the demonstrative /ń-tèn/ is used, this includes things such as books or papers lying on the table, grains, nuts, fruits, cloths as well as anything lying on its side, such as a soda bottle or a rolled-up mat. For most part, it is also tend to be used in the same places where the verb /ùū/ or /mbéī/ is used for ''to put''.

If the object is viewed as being stood in its position, example aa a mortar against a wall the demonstrative /ń-ɗàn/ is used. This includes trees, poles in the ground, walls, grass fencing, in short anything in an upright position.

If an object is being set in its position (as a cup on a table) the demonstrative /ń-ndìn/ is used. Like baskets, cups, chairs, tables, plates and living things seated. (page113. Keegan)
