= Kenga language =

Bongo–Bagirmi language of Chad

Kenga
- Native to: Chad
- Native speakers: (40,000 cited 1997)
- Language family: Nilo-Saharan?: Central Sudanic; Bongo–Bagirmi; Bagirmi; Kenga

Language codes
- ISO 639-3: kyq
- Glottolog: keng1240

Kenga is a Bongo–Bagirmi language of Chad. Speakers make up the majority of the population in Kenga canton in Bitkine sub-prefecture.
