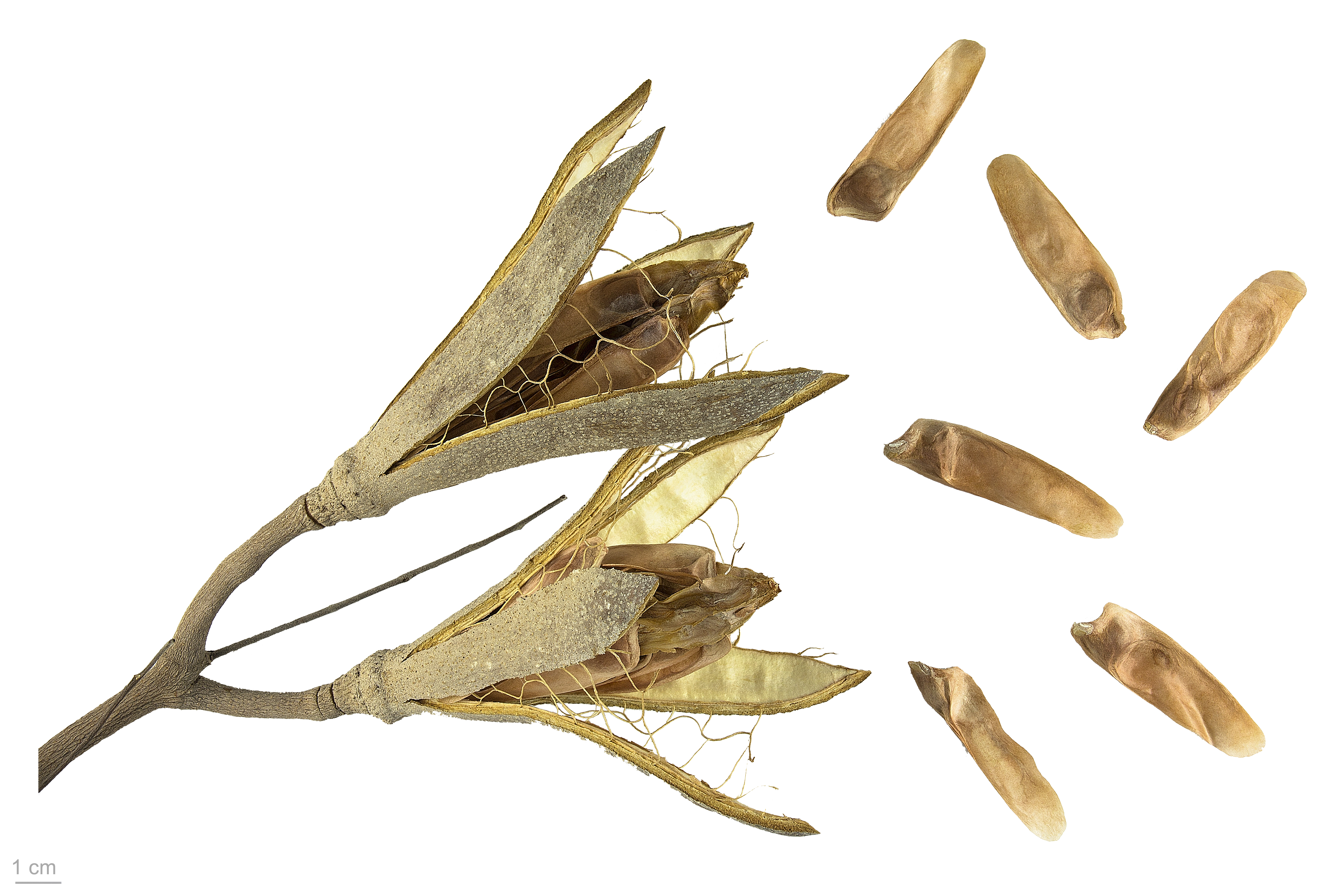
- Pseudocedrela Kotschyi

Scientific classification
- Kingdom: Plantae
- Clade: Tracheophytes
- Clade: Angiosperms
- Clade: Eudicots
- Clade: Rosids
- Order: Sapindales
- Family: Meliaceae
- Genus: Pseudocedrela; Harms
- Species: P. kotschyi

Binomial name
- Pseudocedrela kotschyi (Schweinf.) Harms

= Pseudocedrela =

Genus of plants

Pseudocedrela is a monotypic genus of flowering plants belonging to the family Meliaceae. The only species is Pseudocedrela kotschyi. It is known as hard cedar-mahogany and Dry-zone cedar. It is a source of timber, shade, firewood, chewing stick, arrow/fish poison and has several uses in veterinary and traditional African medicine.

Its native range is Western Tropical Africa to Ethiopia and Uganda.
