= Sara languages =

Language family in southern Chad

Sara
- Central Sara
- Geographic distribution: Chad, Central African Republic
- Ethnicity: Sara people
- Native speakers: c. 2,000,000 (2015)
- Linguistic classification: Nilo-Saharan?: Central Sudanic; Bongo–Bagirmi; Sara–Bagirmi; Sara
- Subdivisions: West; Central; East

Language codes
- Glottolog: cent2044

The Sara languages comprise over a dozen Bongo–Bagirmi languages spoken mainly in Chad; a few are also spoken in the north of the Central African Republic. They are members of the Central Sudanic language family. Greenberg (1966) treats all varieties as dialects of a Sara language, whereas Tucker and Bryan (1966) consider the Sara to be a dialect cluster of several languages. Most members of the different Sara languages/dialects consider their speech form distinct languages, but there is currently insufficient language information to determine which speech varieties need to be considered distinct languages, and which are dialects of other languages.

The most populous variety of Sara proper is Ngambay (Sara Ngambay), a major trade language of southern Chad, with about a million speakers, though Sar (Sara Madjingay) is the lingua franca of Sarh.

== Names ==
The term "Sara languages", sometimes called "Sara Proper languages", is distinct from the so-called "Sara Kaba languages". The latter include Sara Dunjo, Kaba Deme and Kaba Na. The term Sara itself is confusing, as within this family there exists a language named Sar, whose capital is Sarh. The term Kaba is likewise confusing. Kaba of Gore is not a Sara Kaba language, but rather a Sara language. Further, the Sara Kaba group includes a language named Sara Kaba.

== Languages ==
The Sara languages are:

- Sara
  - West Sara
    - Ngambay
    - Laka
    - Kabba
    - Laka of Lau (spoken in Nigeria)
  - Central Sara (Doba)
    - Bedjond
    - Bebote
    - Mango
    - Gor
  - East Sara
    - Sar
    - Mbay
    - Ngam
    - Dagba
    - Gulay
    - Horo

The inclusion of Gulay with the Eastern Sara Languages is based on lexical comparison. Phonologically and morphologically Gulay behaves more like a Central Sara Language.

=== Boyeldieu (2006) ===
Boyeldieu (2006) classifies the Sara languages as follows:

- Sara
  - Peripheral
    - Ndoka
    - Wad
    - Bagiro
    - Na
    - Tiye
    - Kulfa
    - Simé
    - 'Dem
  - Central
    - Sar
    - Mbay
    - Ngambay
    - 'Bedjond
    - Kaba P.
  - Others
    - Bulala
    - Beraku
    - Kenga
    - 'Barma
