= Gula (surname) =

Gula is a surname. Notable people with the surname include:

- Jiří Gula (born 1989), Czech ice-hockey player
- Leonardo Gula (born 1914), Argentine boxer
- Qamar Gula (1952–2022), Afghan singer
- Sharbat Gula (born ca. 1972), Afghan woman who was the subject of a famous December 1984 photograph by journalist Steve McCurry that was on the cover of the June 1985 issue of National Geographic Magazine
