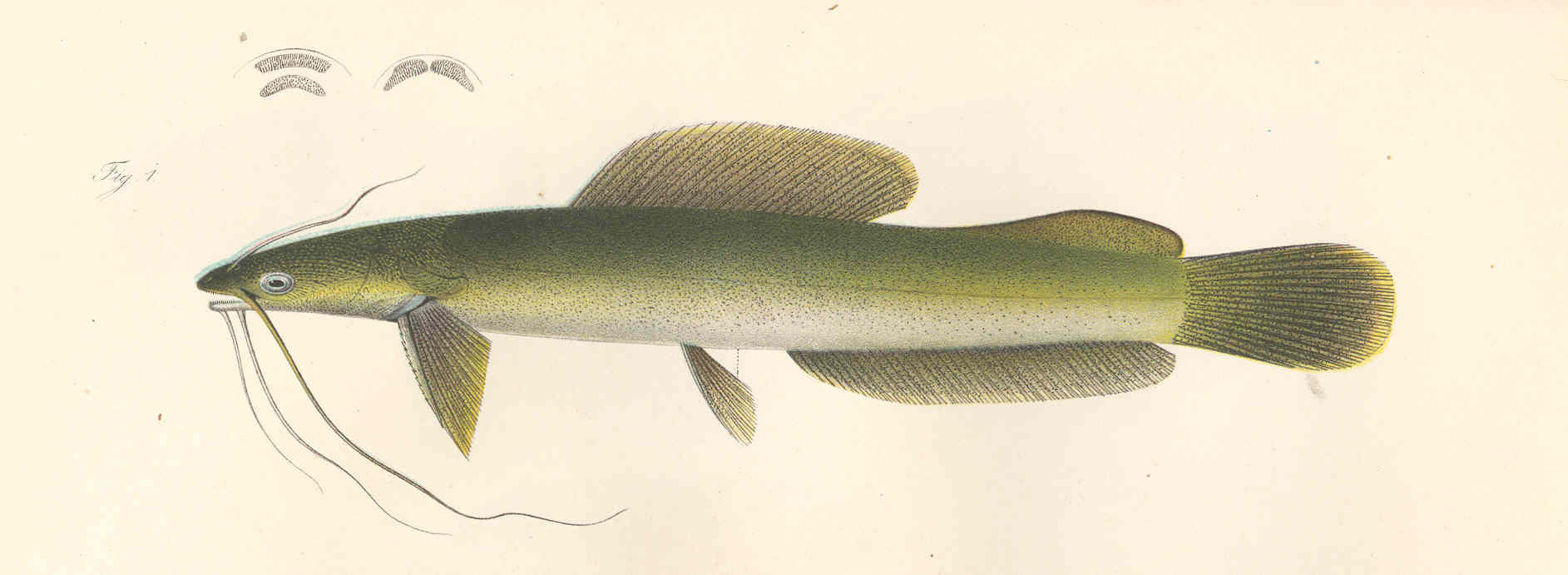
- Heterobranchus isopterus

Scientific classification
- Kingdom: Animalia
- Phylum: Chordata
- Class: Actinopterygii
- Division: Teleostei
- Order: Siluriformes
- Family: Clariidae
- Genus: Heterobranchus; É. Geoffroy Saint-Hilaire, 1809

Type species
- Heterobranchus bidorsalis É. Geoffroy Saint-Hilaire, 1809

Species
- 6, see text.

= Heterobranchus =

Heterobranchus Temporal range: Late Miocene–present

Genus of fishes

Heterobranchus is a genus of airbreathing catfishes native to Africa, though it had a wider distribution in prehistory. Depending on the exact species involved, fish of this genus reach from 64 to 150 cm (25 to 59 in) with the giant vundu (H. longifilis) being the largest completely freshwater fish in southern Africa, reaching 150 cm (59 in) SL and weighing up to 55 kg (121 lb).

The extinct species H. palaeindicus is known from the Early Pliocene of India (Siwalik Hills). The extinct species H. austriacus was widely distributed throughout central, western, and eastern Europe during the late Miocene. H. austriacus likely immigrated from Africa to Europe, potentially in repeated waves, when land connections formed between both continents around this time.

== Taxonomy ==
This genus contains four recent and two fossil species:

- †Heterobranchus austriacus (Thenius, 1952)
- Heterobranchus bidorsalis É. Geoffroy Saint-Hilaire, 1809 (African Catfish)
- Heterobranchus boulengeri (Pellegrin, 1922)
- Heterobranchus isopterus (Bleeker, 1863) —found in West Africa—
- Heterobranchus longifilis Valenciennes, 1840 (Vundu; Sampa)
- †Heterobranchus palaeindicus (Lydekker, 1886)

Heterobranchus has long been known to be closer related to certain species of Clarias than these are to the rest of the genus; the following cladogram is based on a 2026 maximum likelihood phylogenetic tree analyzing genetics:

- - Clarias laeviceps
  - - Clarias salae
    - - Clarias laeviceps
      - Clarias salae
- - - Heterobranchus isopterus
    - Heterobranchus longifilis
  - - Dinotopterus cunningtoni
    - - Clarias ngamensis
      - - Clarias anguillaris
        - - Clarias gariepinus
          - - Bathyclarias longibarbis
            - - Clarias gariepinus
              - Clarias gariepinus
