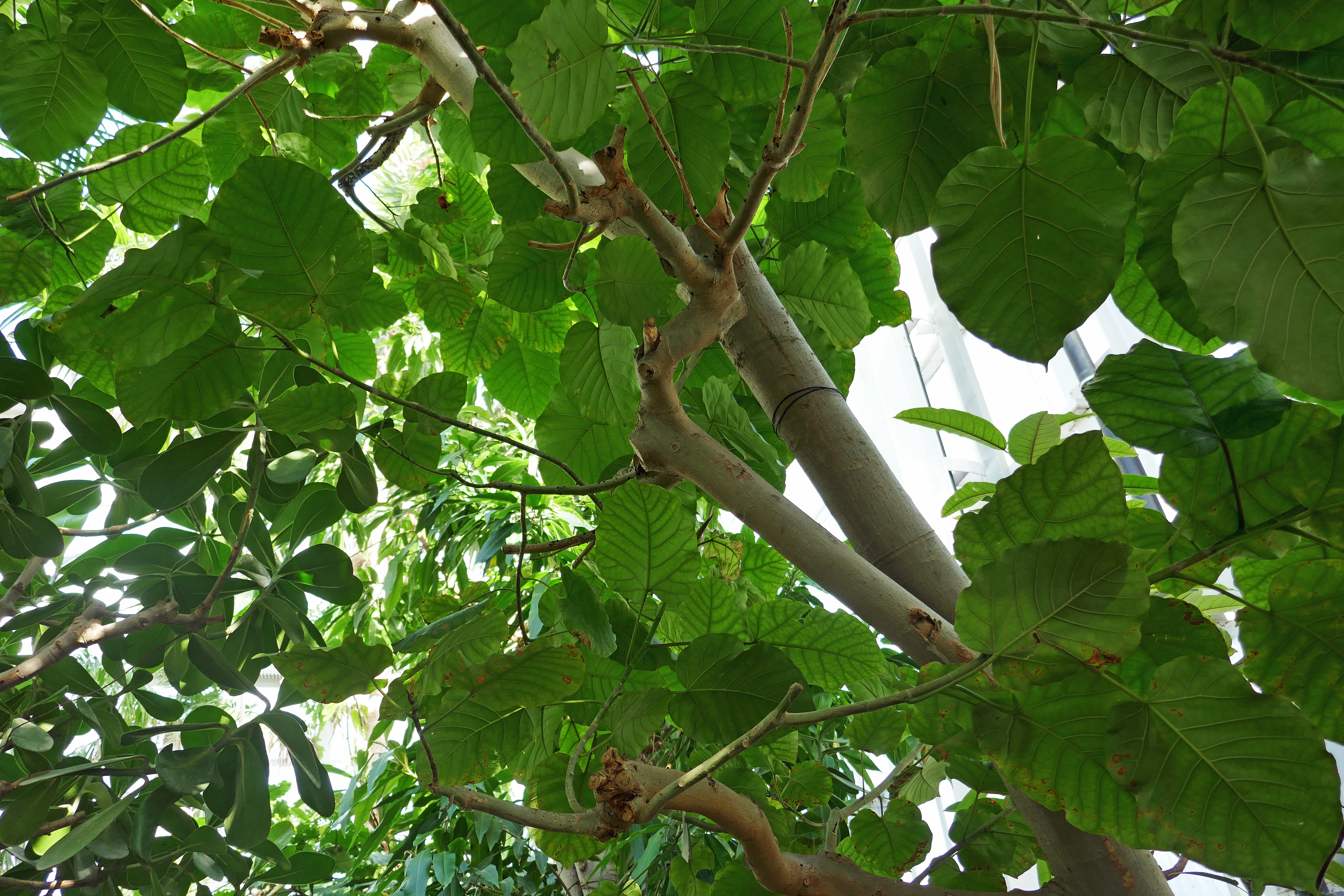

Conservation status
- Least Concern (IUCN 3.1)

Scientific classification
- Kingdom: Plantae
- Clade: Tracheophytes
- Clade: Angiosperms
- Clade: Eudicots
- Clade: Rosids
- Order: Rosales
- Family: Moraceae
- Genus: Ficus
- Species: F. platyphylla

Binomial name
- Ficus platyphylla Delile

Synonyms
- Ficus kotschyana (Miq.) Miq.; Ficus lateralis Warb.; Ficus platyphylla var. pubescens Aubrév.; Urostigma binderianum Kotschy; Urostigma kotschyanum Miq.

= Ficus platyphylla =

Species of tree

Ficus platyphylla is a deciduous tree within the family Moraceae. Common local names include Gamji in Hausa and Gaba or Kobo in Bambara. It is native to western and eastern tropical Africa.

== Description ==
Species grows up to 20 metres (66 ft) tall, the crown is large and spreading while the bark is pale brown with scales and fissures, the species sometimes grows as an Epiphyte. Leaves, alternate, petioles and stipules are present; leaflets are ovate to elliptic in outline, up to 25 centimetres (10 in) long and 17 centimetres (7 in) wide. The fruits are globose in shape, reddish and small, usually between 1–1.5 centimetres (0.4–0.6 in) in diameter, they are arranged in clusters of 1–5 in leaf axils on peduncles that can reach 5 centimetres (2 in) in length.

== Distribution and habitat ==
Commonly found in the savanna regions of West and East Africa south of the Sahara and north of the equatorial rainforests, ranging from Senegal eastwards to Somalia.

== Uses ==
The species is used as an antidote to poison in different cultures. In Nigeria, the stem bark extracts of the plant is used in ethnomedicine to treat a variety of ailments including depression, epilepsy and psychosis. It is also used to expel parasitic worms from the body.
