= Bongo–Baka languages =

Central sudanic subfamily

Bongo
- Bongo–Baka
- Geographic distribution: South Sudan
- Linguistic classification: Nilo-Saharan?: Central Sudanic; Bongo–Bagirmi; Bongo

Language codes
- Glottolog: bong1285 (Bongo) moro1282 (Baka–Beli)

The Bongo languages, or Bongo–Baka, comprise six languages spoken in South Sudan. They are members of the Central Sudanic language family.

The most populous Bongo language is Jur Modo, spoken by a hundred thousand people. The languages are:

- Bongo–Baka
  - Bongo
  - Baka
  - Morokodo–Beli
    - Jur Modo
    - Morokodo (Nyamusa-Molo, Mo’da)
    - Jur Beli (Beli)
    - Mittu †

In various classifications, Bongo is sometimes split off from the rest of the family, so the phrase Bongo–Baka may be less ambiguous than simply Bongo.

However, Boyeldieu (2006) does not consider Bongo–Baka to be a valid grouping, and considers Bongo and Baka to each be primary splits from Proto-Sara-Bongo-Bagirmi.
