= Sar language =

Central Sudanic language spoken in Chad

Sar
- Madjingay
- Native to: Chad
- Native speakers: (180,000 cited 1993 census)
- Language family: Nilo-Saharan?: Central Sudanic; Bongo–Bagirmi; Sara languages; East; Sar
- Dialects: Sar; Nar

Language codes
- ISO 639-3: mwm
- Glottolog: sarr1246

Sar or Sara, also known as Madjingay and Sara Madjingay, is a Bongo–Bagirmi language of southern Chad, and the lingua franca of regional capital of Sarh.

== Phonology ==
The consonants are as follows.

		Labial	Alveolar	Retroflex	Postalveolar /Palatal	Velar
Plosive/ Affricate	tenuis	p	t			k
Plosive/ Affricate	voiced	b	d		d͡ʒ	ɡ
Plosive/ Affricate	prenasalized	m͡b	n͡d		n͡dʒ	ŋ͡ɡ
Plosive/ Affricate	implosive	ɓ	ɗ			
Fricative			s			
Nasal		m	n			
Liquid	oral		l	ɽ		
Liquid	nasalized			ɽ̃		
Semi-vowel	oral				j	w
Semi-vowel	nasalized				j̃	

Vowels and nasal vowels are as follows:

	Front	Central	Back
Close	i ĩ	ɨ	u ũ
Mid	e ẽ	(ə)	o õ
Mid		(ə)	ɔ
Open		a ã	

/o, e/ can also be heard as [ə].

There are three tones.

Tone	Example	Gloss
high	ɡáŋɡá	drum
mid	māl	scavenger
low	jàbə̀	hippopotamus
nasal	tã	sauce
