= Tar Gula language =

Sudanic language spoken in Central Africa

Kara
- Tar Gula
- Native to: Central African Republic, Sudan
- Ethnicity: Kara, Gula
- Native speakers: (13,000 cited 1996)
- Language family: Nilo-Saharan?: Central Sudanic; Bongo–Bagirmi; Kara; Kara
- Dialects: Mele; Mere; Molo; Moto-Mara; Sara; Koto
- Writing system: Latin

Language codes
- ISO 639-3: kcm
- Glottolog: gula1266

Linguistic map of the non-Arab peoples of Darfur.

The Gula language, or Tar Gula, of the Central African Republic, commonly known as Kara, is a Central Sudanic language or dialect cluster. The term "Kara" is also attached to numerous ethnic groups of the region and their languages, and so is often ambiguous.

== Names ==
Ethnologue lists Gula du Mamoun, Kara (of South Sudan) and Yamegi as synonyms, and Molo, Mele, Mot-Mar (Moto-Mara), Sar (Sara), Mere, and Zura (Koto) as dialects.

== Classification ==
Sources disagree as to whether Gula shares a Kara branch with other languages, with proposed Kara languages in one classification reassigned to other branches in other classifications. (See Kara languages.)

== Locations ==
As of 2013, ethnic Kara were reported to be residing in Menamba Boma, Ringi Payam, Raja County.
