= Sinyar people =

Sinyar
Shamya

Total population
- 30,000 (1996)

Languages
- Sinyar language

Religion
- Islam

Linguistic map of the non-Arab peoples of Darfur.

Sinyar are the members of a minor ethnic minority in Chad and possibly Sudan (West Darfur). Most speak Sinyar, a Nilo-Saharan language, as well as Chadian Arabic and Fur. They are Muslims and culturally Fur.

== History ==
According to local tradition, the Sinyars claim to trace their origins to Arabs from Egypt. The Sinyars were subjects of the Keira Sultanate until around 1863, when the Sinyars then became subjects of the Dar Sila kingdom. Starting in 1874, the Turco- Egyptians began invading the region. After border negotiations between the British and French, the area where the Sinyar lived got split into French Chad and Anglo-Egyptian Sudan. A 1996 estimate placed the total population of the Sinyar at around 30,000 or slightly more.

== Culture ==
Many Sinyars are employed as farmers and agricultural laborers. Hunting and fishing used to be common among the Sinyars but environmental degradation has led to their virtual extinction as a form of significant subsistence.

Sinyars were historically matrilineal. Women play a significant role in Sinyar society and are able to be economically independent (with women often making more money than their husbands). Matrilocal residences are common. Sinyars live in extended families where women often outnumber men.

The Sinyars are Muslim.
