= Sara–Bongo–Bagirmi languages =

Central Sudanic language branch

Sara–Bongo–Bagirmi
- Bongo–Bagirmi
- Geographic distribution: CAR, Chad, South Sudan, Sudan
- Linguistic classification: Nilo-Saharan?: Central Sudanic; Sara–Bongo–Bagirmi
- Proto-language: Proto-Sara-Bongo-Bagirmi
- Subdivisions: Bongo–Baka; Kara; Bagirmi; Sara; Doba; Kaba; Vale; Sinyar; Yulu

Language codes
- Glottolog: sara1341

The Bongo–Bagirmi or Sara–Bongo–Bagirmi (SBB) languages are the major branch of the Central Sudanic language family with about forty languages. Principal groups include Bagirmi languages such as Naba and the Sara languages. They are spoken across CAR, Chad, South Sudan, Sudan and adjacent countries.

== Languages ==
The Sara–Bongo–Bagirmi languages are for the most part poorly studied, and there is little agreement as to their internal classification. The table below is taken from Lionel Bender, as summarized in Blench (2000).

- Bongo–Baka
- Kara (= Tar Gula?)
- Sinyar (Shemya)?
- Bagirmi
- Sara
- Doba (Bedjond, Gor, Mango)
- Kaba
- Vale
- Birri (likely to be closer to Kresh)
- Fongoro (Formona)?
- Yulu (Yulu–Binga)

Sinyar and Fongoro may not be Bongo–Bagirmi or even Central Sudanic languages.

== Classification ==
Boyeldieu (2006) classifies the Sara-Bongo–Bagirmi languages as follows.

- Sara-Bongo-Bagirmi
  - Bongo
  - Modo, 'Beli, Baka
  - Western
    - Yulu
    - Core Western
      - Fer, Gula Koto
      - Gula Zura, 'Bu'bu, Gula Mere, Gula Sara
      - Nduga, Luto?
      - Sara
        - Peripheral: Ndoka, Wad, Bagiro, Na, Tiye, Kulfa, Simé, 'Dem
        - Central: Sar, Mbay, Ngambay, 'Bedjond, Kaba P.
        - Others: Bulala, Beraku, Kenga, 'Barma

Boyeldieu (2006) considers the homelands (Urheimats) of the language groups to be as follows.

- Proto-Sara-Bongo-Bagirmi: Bahr el Ghazal / southwestern South Sudan, by the border with easternmost Central African Republic
- Proto-Western Sara-Bongo-Bagirmi: north-central extreme of the Central African Republic
- Proto-Sara: south-central Chad, along the border with northwestern Central African Republic

The Sara–Bongo–Bagirmi languages in the east are closer to other Central Sudanic languages, while the Sara languages in the west have diverged more from the typical Central Sudanic typological profile due to contact with Ubangian and other languages.

== Reconstruction ==
Proto-Sara–Bongo–Bagirmi
- Proto-Bongo–Bagirmi
- Reconstruction of: Bongo–Bagirmi languages

=== Plants ===
Proto-Sara–Bongo–Bagirmi plant names:

Species	Proto-Sara–Bongo–Bagirmi
Stylochiton sp.	*bada
Ficus ingens	*ɓAlɛ; *ɓARlɛ
Dichrostachys cinerea	*baɭi; *bEɭE
Loudetia annua	*bamu; *bVmV
Daniellia oliveri	*ɓAtɛ; *ɓita; *ɓuta; *ɓito; *ɓVtV
Amaranthus cruentus	*budu
Andropogon gayanus	*butu
Nymphaea sp.	*ɓVlV
Manihot glaziovii	*bVngV
Cissus populnea	*Caɭa
Lagenaria siceraria	*Ciɓa; *Cuɓa
Cissus integrifolia	*Cuƒu; *COƒO; *Nuƒu; *NOƒO
Terminalia sp.	*CV; *ɭV
Sida rhombifolia	*ɗAɗɛ
Acacia albida	*didi; *diɗi
Combretum glutinosum	*diro; *dVrV
Leptadenia hastata	*ɗisa; *ɗusa
Aeschynomene nilotica	*dulɛ
Strychnos sp.	*duɲu; *diɲi; *duyu; *diyi
Sterculia setigera	*ɖaka
Loudetia simplex	*ɖakɔ
Hyparrhenia bagirmica	*gama
Hibiscus sp.	*gbakɔ
Grewia venusta	*Gimbo; *GVmbV
Urena lobata	*gumbu
Isoberlinia doka	*kabɔ; *kaba
Cordia africana	*kAjɛ
Hymenocardia acida	*kArɛ
Calotropis procera	*kaRpɔ; *kARpɛ
Ficus glumosa	*kɔlɔ; *kilɔ
Afzelia africana	*kila; *Gila
Gardenia sp. (?)	*Kiri; *Giri
Ximenia americana	*kiti; *kVtV; *titi; *tVtV
Ficus platyphylla	*KOɓO; *KVɓV
Ceiba pentandra	*kuɭa
Parinari curatellifolia	*kuma
Jatropha sp.	*kuma
Diospyros mespiliformis	*kuRmɛ; *kARmɛ; *kuRma
Ficus sycomorus	*kutɛ; *kVtV
Detarium microcarpum	*kuʈu; *nguʈu; *guʈu
Lophira lanceolata	*kVyV
Combretum collinum	*ɭEmbE; *ɭumbɛ
Tephrosia bracteolata	*ɭVɲV
Gardenia erubescens	*maca; *masa; *maKa
Parkia africana	*matɔ; *mbaRtɔ
Annona senegalensis	*mbArɛ; *mburɛ; *mbARwɛ; *mbuRwɛ
Grewia sp. (?)	*mɔkɔ
Nymphaea sp.	*mEɗE
Amblygonocarpus andongensis	*miɭi; *miɭo; *mOɭO; *miri; *miro; *mOrO
Vitex sp.	*mOyI; *mVyV; *mOɲI; *mVɲV
Pseudocedrela kotschyi	*muru
Mitragyna inermis	*nɖAɲɛ; *nɖVɲV
Imperata cylindrica	*nɖoku; *nɖeki
Ziziphus sp.	*ngAɖɛ; *ngAɗɛ
Acacia sp.	*ngara; *ngaɭa
Balanites aegyptiaca	*ngura
Hexalobus monopetalus	*NVCV
Acacia sieberiana	*paɭa
Raphionacme sp.	*pOyO; *pVyV
Celtis integrifolia	*Sala; *SVlV
Rottboellia exaltata	*Saya
Anogeissus leiocarpus	*Siɖɔ; *Siɖa
Kigelia aethiopium	*Soku
Cissus quadrangularis	*taɗa
Cucurbitaceae sp.	*taya
Pennisetum pedicellatum	*tEmbE
Striga sp.	*tiɭo; *tuɭɛ; *kiɭo; *kuɭɛ
Jardinea sp.	*tuwa
Tapinanthus sp.	*tVmV
Burkea africana	*wVɭV
Anogeissus leiocarpus	-
Ficus thonningii	-
Piliostigma thonningii	-
Pseudocedrela kotschyi	-
Securinega virosa	-
Crateva adansonii	-
Asparagus sp.	-
Dactyloctenium aegyptium	-
Sclerocarya birrea	-
Ficus polita	-
Ficus sp.	-
Balanites aegyptiaca	-
Sesbania pachycarpa	-
Cochlospermum tinctorium	-
Xanthosoma mafaffa	-
Luffa sp.	-

=== Fish ===
Proto-Sara-Bongo-Bagirmi fish names:

Species	Proto-Sara-Bongo-Bagirmi
Ctenopoma spp.	*ɓakɔ; *ɓaku; *ɓVkV
Distichodus sp.	*bata
Alestes macrolepidotus	*boru; *beri; *ɓoru; *ɓeri
Siluridae sp. (?)	*buli; *bOlI; *bolu
Siluridae sp.	*bVngV
Mormyridae spp.	*CAɓɛ; *CAbɛ
Distichodus spp.	*Ceri
Alestes spp.	*dalu
Citharinus spp.	*dOrO
Bagrus bajad bajad	*duɓa
Synodontis spp., Auchenoglanis spp. et alii	*gaRga
Heterobranchus bidorsalis, Clarias spp.	*gɔrɔ
Bagridae sp.	*GElE
Labeo spp., Barbus spp.	*guɗu; *gOɗO; *Suɗu; *SOɗO; *Sudu; *SOdO; *ɓudu; *ɓOdO
Characidae sp., Citharinidae sp. (?)	*janga; *Canga
Tetraodon fahaka strigosus	*k+ɖ + kiɭo
Lates niloticus	*kaRɓɔ
Malapterurus electricus	*Kiɓi; *tiɓi; *Kibi
Protopterus annectens	*Kuri; *Kuru; *KuRyi; *KuRyu
Mormyridae sp.	*mARlɛ
Ophicephalus obscurus	*mOgO; *migo
Clarias spp., Heterobranchus bidorsalis	*nduli; *ndolu; *ndVlV
Heterotis niloticus	*ngɔɭɔ
Tilapia spp.	*ngura
Alestes nurse	*ŋmaŋma; *ŋmɔŋmɔ; *ŋmaɲa; *ŋmɔɲɔ
Mormyridae spp.	*pAtɛ
Tilapia spp., Hemichromis spp.	*pORpO; *paRpa; *SORpO; *SaRpa
Citharinus citharus	*puru
Polypterus spp.	*SAɭɛ; *ngAɭɛ
Schilbe spp., Eutropius niloticus niloticus	*SErE; *SArɛ; *CErE; *CArɛ
Siluridae spp.	*Sili; *SVlV; *sili; *sVlV
Hepsetus odoe, Hydrocyon spp.	*Siya; *Suya
Characidae sp., Citharinidae sp. (?)	*sOɭO; *siɭo; *sVɭV; *SOɭO; *Siɭo; *SVɭV; *ɓOɭO; *ɓiɭo; *ɓVɭV
Polypterus spp.	*Suɭa; *Siɭa
Gymnarchus niloticus	*tumu; *temi; *ɲumu; *ɲemi
Heterobranchus spp.	-
Lates niloticus	-
Bagridae spp., Clariidae spp.	-
Citharinus spp.	-
Malapterurus electricus	-

== See also ==
- List of Proto-Sara-Bongo-Bagirmi reconstructions (Wiktionary)
