= Moru people =

Total population
- 230,000

Languages
- Moru

Religion
- Christianity

Related ethnic groups
- Aringa, Lugbara, Màʼdí, Avukaya, Logo

Moru is an ethnic group of South Sudan. Most of them live in Western Equatoria. They speak Moru, a Central South Sudanic language. Many members of this ethnicity are Christians, most being members of the Episcopal Church of the South Sudan (ECS). The Pioneer missionary in the area was Dr Kenneth Grant Fraser of the Church Missionary Society (CMS). The population of this ethnicity possibly does not exceed 200,000.

== History ==
The clearest communal historical narratives are of attacks by the Azande, particularly those that drove them onto Odo hill near Lui, raids by slavers from the North. It was loosely part of the Ottoman-Egyptian province of Equatoria, administered by Sir Samuel Baker and then Charles George Gordon and finally Emin Pasha. The Moru area was then part of the Lado Enclave, in the far north east of the Congo Free State, later Belgian Congo from 1894 to 1910.

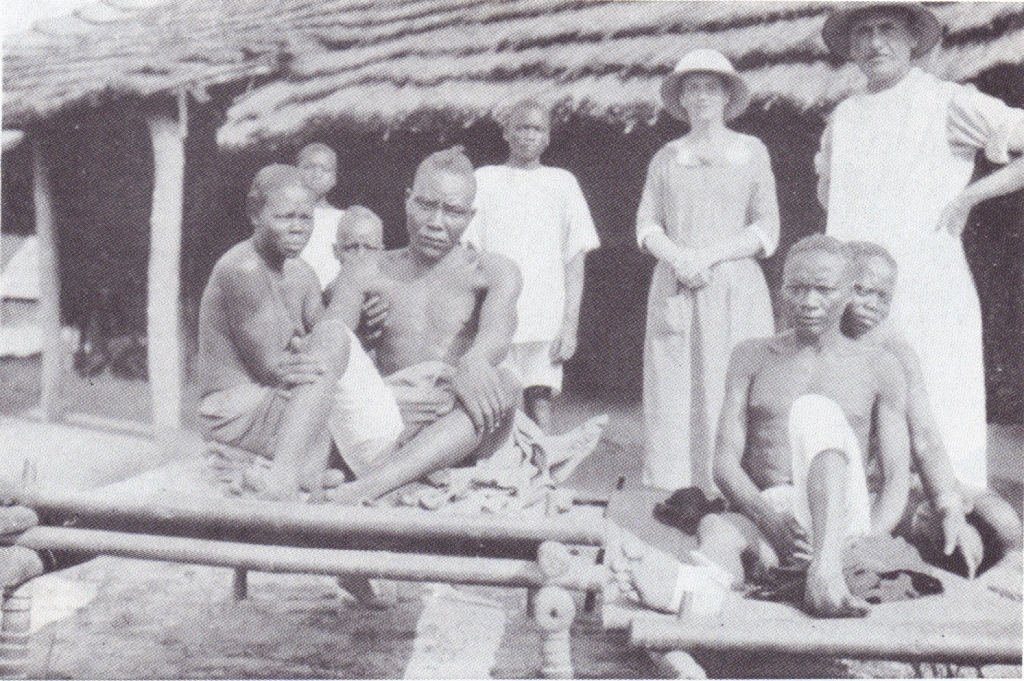
Patients at Lui hospital in 1923, having been wounded by lions.

Dr Kenneth Grant Fraser, a physician and missionary for the Gordon Memorial Sudan Mission (GMSM) of the Church Missionary Society (CMS) of England, and his wife Eileen began working in South Sudan in 1920 to improve access to health care, establish churches, and improve education. Fraser organized the establishment of a hospital at Lui and developed a program that trained and equipped medical workers to provide medical care under his direction at the hospital. Leper colonies were created under his direction. He trained teachers and evangelists to serve schools and churches that were established in Moruland along main roads. The buildings also operated as dispensaries. The benefits have included a good quality of education for the Moru people and reform of some harmful indigenous practices and customs.

== Demographics ==
The Moru, who belong to the ethnic group which includes the Madi, Lugbara, Avukaya and Logo of Uganda and Democratic Republic of Congo, live in the southern part of Mundri County, Western Equatoria, South Sudan. Mundri County is located in Central Western part of Equatoria Region in Western Equatoria Province. It is between 4°N and 6°N of Equator and 29°E and 31°E. There are five main divisions of the Moru, namely: Miza; Ägyi; Moroändri; Kediro and 'Bari'ba, who each live in a distinct area and have their own dialectical differences. Other partial divisions can also be recognised.

The northern part of Mundri County is inhabited by the Jur cluster, which includes the Beli, Sopi, Mödö, Nyamusa, Wira, Biti and Morokodo. Although they are often erroneously classified as Moru they form a distinct language group, more closely related to the Bongo and Baka. The Moru have received the most attention in the past and Moru Miza was the vernacular used in education and the church throughout the district.

Settlement is in extended family groups surrounded by their gardens. These families are linked together into clans under headmen and sub-chiefs, but there are few physical concentrations of villages. The term village is generally used to describe the people who relate to one centre.

== Agriculture ==
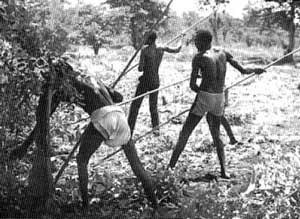
Using the traditional Moru hoe to clear a field ready for planting

Most families are subsistence farmers depending on rain fed agriculture to produce food for their families. Any surplus may be sold for cash or bartered for products that cannot be produced locally. The staple crop is sorghum which is grown in various field types in association with sesame, cowpeas, bulrush millet and finger millet. Other important crops are groundnuts, maize, cassava, sweet potatoes, okra, pumpkins and various green vegetables. Livestock are kept mainly on the northern and eastern sides of the district. The most commonly kept animals are sheep and goats. Poultry are kept by most households. The number of cattle has increased during the last two decades.

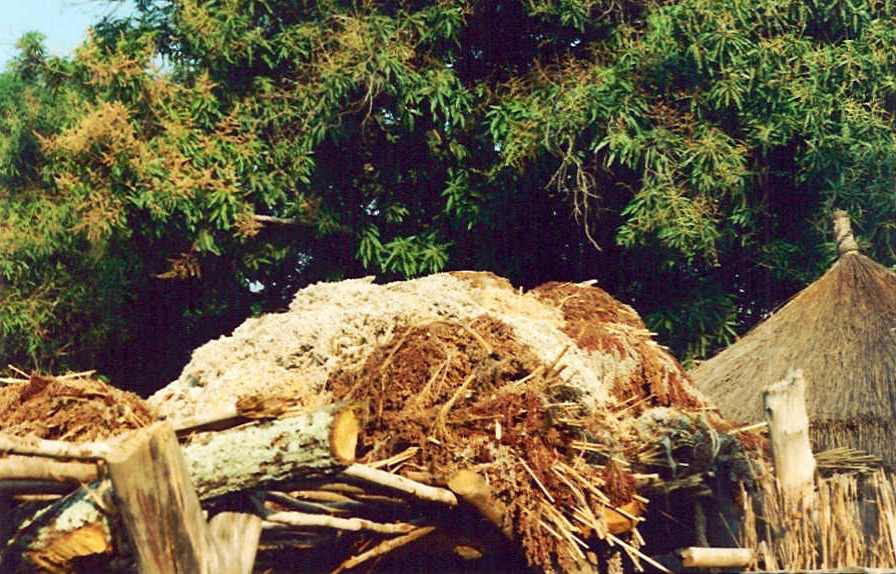
Recently harvested sorghum drying on a raised platform. Sorghum is the main staple and there are a number of different varieties grown together.

Contact with the wild bush is important, and many of the relishes are obtained from wild sources. Hunting and fishing are important economic and social activities. Other wild foods include vegetables, wild fruit, fungi and insects, especially termites. The bush is also the source of building materials, fuel and fibres. The traditional way of cultivation is for close relatives to cultivate together in one area. This is traditionally called a Kätiri, and is traditionally made of segments divided round a central marker such as a large tree or ant hill.

== Dancing ==
Between and during economic activities, the Moru spend a lot of time on other cultural pursuits which are of non-economic value. Predominant among the many cultural and social activities are dancing and singing. Both of these activities serve as recreation and realization of cultural values. Drumming, dancing and singing in Moru society are related to the three seasons. The correlation between the drumming, dancing and singing, the three seasonal periods, and general physical and economic welfare of the people is one of the most interesting features of Moru society.

From January to April, food is abundant, the people are healthy, physical labour is very little, and there is a great deal or idle time. During this time, the dance performed is called RUMA. The number of drums used during this dance is four. The biggest drum is called Dugye (sometimes also called Lari Endre ‘the mother drum’), the medium size drum is called Ruma, from which the dance takes its name, and the two small high pitched drums are called Lari Ngwa ‘Children of the Drum’. From May to August, when there is a great deal of agricultural economic activities, the dancing is called DEGO. The number of drums used during this dance is one Dugye and two small lari ngwa. With the peoples' strength sapped by the heavy labours and the assumed or real scarcity of food, the movements or this dance begin slow in relation to the rhythm or the songs which is also slow. The movements progress to Ngala when the movements and steps become considerably quicker and faster. DEGO dances are infrequent and do not last a complete night. From September to December the dance is called YELU. The number of drums used is five. They consist of one Dugye, one Diri (also known as Biri) and three small high-pitched drums Lari Ngwa. The movements which are involved reflect the great health and strength which the people have just acquired as a result of eating freshly harvested crops. YELU is the harvest season dance.

=== Musical Instruments ===
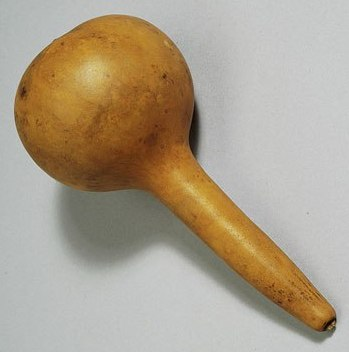
A rattle called gara is used by women in church or at dances. It is made from a particular gourd filled with okra seeds.

The Kudi and Lekyembe are harps which play important roles in Moru society. They serve as recreation and realization of cultural values. They particularly play a role during engagement between males and females. They are also used as important instruments for covering long distances and entertainment.

A rattle called gara is used by women in church or at dances. It is made from a small gourd that has been dried. It has a spherical body and narrow tapering neck with rounded end that serves as the instrument's handle. It is filled with a number of medium-sized seeds, normally okra, inserted through a circular hole cut into the centre of the top, and then resealed.

== Sources ==
- CATFORD, J.R. (1953) ‘The Introduction of Cotton as a cash crop in the Maridi area of Equatoria.’ Sudan Notes and Records. Vol 34.
- DAVISON, R.A. (1982) Mundri agriculture Development District Exploratory Soil Survey. RMANR Planning Dept Report No 31. Booker Agric International Ltd.
- EATON-EVANS, M.J. (1981) Nutrition survey Report. Mundri District. Nov 1980-July 1981. Project Development Unit, Ministry of Agriculture and Natural Resources, Southern Region, Democratic Republic of the Sudan.
- ELIAS, Scopas.M. (1987) Taoye Opi Moru Ro Kyeno Kayi Ro. (Behaviour of the Past Moru Chiefs) Moru Literature Committee – Juba.
- ELIAS, Scopas Mägyä. (1996) Longo Moru ro Madrasa ya;– Moru school song book. Summer Institute of Linguistics
- ELIAS, Scopas Mägyä. (1996) Canon Ezra: My best friend in Sudan. Summer Institute of Linguistics
- EVANS-PRITCHARD, E.E. (1938) 'A note on rain makers of the Moro clan' - MAN XXXVIII
- FELKIN, W. (1883) 'Notes on the Madi or Moru Tribe.' Proceedings of the Royal Society of Edinburgh. 12. pp. 303–353.
- FRASER, K.G. (1926) 'Witchcraft and Healing in the Moru Tribe.' in The Mission Hospital.
- KAYANGA, Samuel E. (1998) ‘Son of the Soil;– Man of God: Andarea Apaya (1908-1966).’ p. 98–107 in WHEELER, Andrew (ed) Announcing the Light: Sudanese Witnesses to the Gospel.
- KAYANGA, Samuel E. (1998) ‘A Vision of Family: Elizabeta William and Early Women’s Ministry amongst the Moru.’ p. 108-117 in WHEELER, Andrew (ed) Announcing the Light: Sudanese Witnesses to the Gospel.
- KAYANGA, Samuel E. (1998) ‘Faith, Integrity and Freedom: Elinana Jabi Ngalamu (1917-1992).’ p. 230-252 in WHEELER, Andrew (ed) Announcing the Light: Sudanese Witnesses to the Gospel.
- MORU LITERACY PROGRAMME . (2007) Moru–English Dictionary.
- NALDER, L.F. (1936) Equatorial Province Handbook. Vol 1. Mongalla; Sudan Government Memoranda No 4.
- NALDER, L.F. (1937) A tribal survey of Mongalla Province. OUP for the International Institute, London.
- RMANR (1983) Mundri Smallholder Survey Report – Report No 55 – Planning Dept RMANR
- SELIGMAN, C.G. & B.Z. (1932) Pagan Tribes of the Nilotic Sudan. London. Routledge & Sons.
- SHARLAND, Roger.W. (1989) Indigenous Knowledge and Technical Change in a Subsistence Society; Lessons from the Moru of Sudan. ODI Agricultural Administration Network Paper No.9. London, ODI.
- SURAYA, Issa .(2012) Odragba's legend: A tale from the Republic of South Sudan
- SURAYA, Issa. (2012) When God left: collections of short poems
- SURAYA, Issa .(2012) Odragba's legend: A tale from the Republic of South Sudan
- SURAYA, Issa. (2012) When God When God left: collections of short poems
- SURAYA Issa. (2019) Being true to yourself: Are you a loyal friend?
- SURAYA Issa. (2022). What Does Trust Mean To You?
- SURAYA Issa. (2023). Things Your Domestic Workers would love to tell you—But Will not: cleaners tell all
- SURAYA Issa. (2023). (Princess Nora and the Pigeon: Season 1
- TINGWA, Peter O. The History of the Moru Church in Sudan.
