= Madi people =

Maʼdi
Total population
- 429,300

Regions with significant populations
- Uganda: 397,000
- South Sudan: 30,000
- DR Congo: 2,300

Languages
- Ma'di, English

Religion
- Christians, Animist minority

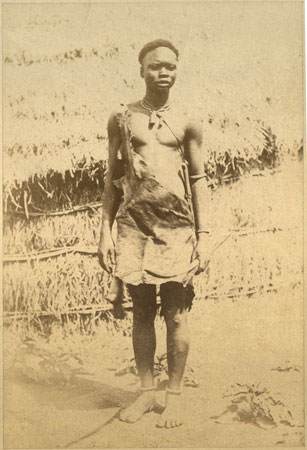
Madi man late 1870s in southern Sudan

The Madi or Màʼdí are a Central Sudanic speaking people that live in Magwi County in Eastern Equatoria, South Sudan and the districts of Adjumani and Moyo in Uganda. From south to north, the area runs from Nimule, at the South Sudan Uganda border, to Nyolo River where the Maʼdi mingle with the Acholi, the Bari, and the Lolubo. From the east to west, it runs from Parajok/Magwi to Uganda across the River Nile.

== Language ==
The speakers refer to themselves as Maʼdi ("people"). the letter ʼd is an implosive sound. The speakers refer to their language as maʼdi ti, literally meaning Maʼdi mouth. Among themselves, Maʼdi refer to each other as belonging to a suru (tribe), which may further be broken down to pa (clan), which in some cases overlaps with suru. While a Maʼdi can only marry someone from outside their clan, they must normally marry within the group that shares the Maʼdi language.

Many neighboring speakers of Moru–Madi languages go by the name of Maʼdi.

== Brief history ==
=== Etymology of Маʼdi ===
According to one popular folk tale, the name Madi came as an answer to a question by a white man to a Madi man. When the first white person in the area asked the question 'who are you?', the bemused response was madi, i.e. a person. This was taken to be the name of the people, which came to be corrupted to the present.

Another Ma'di narrative tries to account for the names of some of the Moru–Madi group members. When the progenitors of the Ma'di were pushed southwards, on reaching a strategic location they declared, Muro-Amadri, i.e., "Let's form a settle here". And so they formed a cluster to defend themselves. This group came to be known as the Moru. A group broke off in search of greener pastures in a more or less famished state, until they found an edible tree called lugba ('desert dates' - ximenia aegyptiaca).

After they ate some of the fruits, they took some with them. When the time came to refill their stomachs again, a woman who lost her harvest was heard inquiring about the lugba ri 'the desert dates'. This group came to be known as logbara but the Maʼdi still call them lugbari. The final group on reaching fertile grounds resolved and declared ma ʼdi 'here I am (finally)'. And these came to be known as the Maʼdi.

=== Early history ===
Maʼdi oral history claims Nigeria as the cradle of Maʼdi people – their place of origin. According to the one commonly told oral narrative, the Maʼdi people left Nigeria, moved southward until they reached Amadi, a town in southwest Uganda, where they settled. The word Amadi in Maʼdi language means here we are. It also means, at our place. From this storyline by then the Maʼdi and Moru were still one ethnic group.

From Amadi, the Maʼdi traveled eastward reaching River Nile. There they separated into two clusters – Moru and Maʼdi. The Moru cluster went back – westward; the Maʼdi cluster settled by the riverbank. It is believed the two clusters (groups) separated because of a squabble over a piece of groundnut. A Maʼdi man found some groundnut, which he ate it alone. His Moru brother blamed him for being greedy and hence moved away from him.

However today Maʼdi oral history cannot specify the period during which Maʼdi migrated from Nigeria to Uganda. Moreover, it cannot also bridge the missing historical link between the present-day Maʼdi and their assumed accentors – the Nigerians. Non-Maʼdi scholars who have written on Maʼdi have different opinions about the origin of the Maʼdi. Though it has remained unclear where the Maʼdi people came from, most likely they arrived to southern Uganda region, around 1400–1700 A.D. This period coincided with the migration of the Nilotic people from north to south.

From one Maʼdi oral history narrative, after the Maʼdi and Moru parted, some Maʼdi groups settled near Mount Rajaf, near the Nile. Others settled in Nyarabanga, south of Rajaf. In those places, they intermingled with Bari people. In Rajaf, the Maʼdi lived for years. As their number grew, they also dispersed into sub-groups, many of them left Rajaf. Over the years many moved southward on different routes, looking for better terrains to settle. Along the way, several groups evolved and acquired different names: Arapi, Goopi (Logopi), Logili, Mugi, Okei, Pandikeri, Patibi (Moiʼba), etc.

According to one storyline, the Maʼdi people found the Bari had already settled in Rajaf and Nyarabanga. Adherents to this storyline believe that the Bari have settled in Gondokoro, Rajaf and Nyarabanga, around 1600 A.D. That the Ma'di had found the Bari had already settled in Rajaf and Nyarabanga.

Another commonly known narrative among Madi claims that some Maʼdi groups came from Bari. That the Mugi descends from the Bari of Nyarabanga; the Arapi, Logopi, and Logili descend from Bari-Logo. That the Okei, Ngaya, Patibi and Pandikeri also descend from Bari. However, some none-Madi writers have different point of view; they suggest that Ma'di came from Bari-Logo. For example, according to the Belgian writer, Armand Hutereau, the Bari-Logo thinks are probably or Lugbara who descended from the Lowa or the Kibali until they encountered the Dai; riverains of the Makua. They were later probably dispersed by the Medje-Mangbele under Abonga, followed by the Azande under Wando, Ukwa, and Bokoio (Bokoyo).

It is believed that from Rajaf, a group journeyed southeast and settled at Aru, few kilometers, southeast of Rajaf. That group founded the Olubo ethnic group. One of the founders was chief Luala. From Aru, an Olubo group moved southward, crossed River Yii (River Kit) and settled in Moli. Later on, the Ngaya, Okei, Pandikeri also came to Moli. They were followed by the Beka and Kiloloro groups, which narrators believe are of Kuku origin. The Paselo and Kamia groups also crossed the Nile and settled near Mount Ayo, by the riverbank.

From Moli, the Mugi, Kiloloro, Pandikeri, etc., moved southeast – to Opari. The Logopi group from Bari-Logo, across the Nile, also came to Opari. Collectively the groups, which settled in Opari, called themselves Bori. It is debatable which group settled first in Opari. Some people believe the Logopi came first. Some say the Ngaya came first. Yet others say the Pandikeri arrived first.

Andruga from Pandikeri became the first chief of Bori. His son Milla Akeri succeeded him. Milla became the greatest chief of Bori. His son Kanyara Draru succeeded him. During Milla's reign, Bori also settled in Owingykibul and Ayipa, a territory east of Opari. Until then that area was a forest; a hunting terrain for Bori and Acholi groups. Scramble for Owinykibul then became a source of conflict of between the Acholi and Madi. Each group claimed Owinykibul as its ancestral land.

By the time different Maʼdi groups settled in Moli and Opari, one group, which lived in Kuku area, left and moved eastward. It passed Mount Nyeri, crossed the Nile, and settled at the foot of Mount Bolizo. The group called its new settlement named the place Guru (later renamed Nimule). The word Guru, in Madi language means valley. According to one narrative, a man called Manini, who led his group from across the Nile, founded Guru. However, another narrative claims that Manini and his people found a man called Aci (also known as Motto) in Guru. According to that storyline, the Nile carried Motto to Guru from Bunyoro. As time passed by, some groups (Pakurukwe, Pakoi, Bari-Bilinya, etc.,) from Kuku and Bari, also came to Guru.

As several Maʼdi groups moved southeast and southwest of Rajaf, one group crossed the Nile, and traveled south. That group settled at a place called Avori – the present-day Loa. In Avori, a man named Vuri, from Pavura family, became the first custodian of the land. Two groups from Avori moved northward and settled near Mount Remo. One group was called Paakori, the other was called Pafoki.

Years later in Avori, one group called itself Lukai. Maʼdi oral history narrators believe the ancestor of Lukai came from Lolubo (Olubo). According one narrative, a man called Jukiri founded the Lukai group. It is believed that Jukiri and his brother Nyikwara were fugitives from Aru, driven away by Lolubo elders.

According to one narrative, in Aru, a group of people gathered under a tree for a meeting. Jukiri and Nyikware were among them. As the meeting went on, the shadow shifted towards the brothers, and Olubo elders were left on the sun. The elders asked the brothers to leave the shadow for them. They refused; so fight broke up. Consequently, the brothers were forced to leave Aru.

The fugitives ran southward – and crossed river Yii. They traveled and reached near Mount Foki. Jukiri, the elder brother, then told Nyikwara, they should separate and go in different directions. So that in case the Lolubo men follow them, find one person, and kill him, the other will survive. The survivor will carry on the family name. So, the brothers separated. Nyikwara went southeast, where in time; he became the ancestor of Acholi-Panyikwara ethnic group. Jukiri travelled southwest and arrived in Avori.

In Avori, Jukiri met Vuri, who was the custodian of the land. Vuri cared for Jukiri until he grew up. He then gave Jukiri his daughter for wife. Jukiri and his wife became the parents of three sons: Girale, Bilaro and Kado. They also had a daughter called Abinia.

After Jukiri settled in Avori, a man called Muludia Kwiakwia also came to Avori. According to one account, he was carried by the Nile – another way of saying he came from the south. Vuri welcomed Muludia and gave him a place to settle. The two became friends. Their friendship lasted until a conflict started between them. Vuri demanded that Muludia should leave Avori. So, fight broke up. During the fight Vuri's son shot and killed Muludia's son.

Jukiri then came and brokered peace between the warring parties. As tradition demanded, Vuri had to pay a ransom, to Muludia. During those years, blood-price could also be paid by women. Vuri did not have a virgin daughter. So, he asked Jukiri to give him his daughter. Jukiri gave Abinia to him. He in turn gave her to Muludia. Then a council of elders settled the conflict between them.

Afterward Muludia left Avori. He went northward and built settlement in Musura, near Kerepi, west of Opari. By then Milla Akeri was the chief of Bori. When Milla heard that Muludia and his people moved from Avori and settled in Musura, he became angry. His army went to drive Muludia away. Fight broke up and Muludia was pushed out of Musura. He went and settled in Kerepi-Borongole. There he had several children among which were the sons: Julu, Toke, Kicere, and Loku. In time, he became the ancestor of the Kerepi and Gonyapi groups. In Kerepi, Loku became the founder of the Abacha family; Kicere became the first chief of Kerepi-Tedire. Eberu, the son Kicere succeeded the father as a chief.

After Muludia left for Musura, in Avori, Jukiri who gave his daughter to Vuri demanded that Vuri should compensate him. He did not want to take any offer from Vuri, other than the chieftaincy, which Vuri held. So Vuri gave Jukiri his chieftaincy as compensation. Jukiri's chieftaincy marked the beginning of the Odrupee rule in Lukai. Girale became the second chief of Lukai after his father Jukiri.

The Lukai people lived in Avori for many years. From Avori they then moved southeast, to Mugali. In Mugali, Odu, the son of Girale become a chief. Odu had two sons Volo and Bada. After Odu died, his uncle Kado succeeded him. After Kado died his nephew, Volo became a chief. After Volo died, Bada succeeded him. When Bada was slain during a war, his brother Amoli succeeded him. After Amoli died his cousin, Loku succeeded him. After Loku died his son, Surur Iforo succeeded him.

It is believed that several factors: drought, inter-clan fights and fights with the Turkish slave raiders (which the indigenous people called Tukutuku), forced Lukai to Mugali. They called Mugali, Agali – meaning, we refused conflicts. However, for their misfortune, conflicts followed them to Mugali. The Tukutuku did not leave them alone.

=== The Ma'di resistance during the age of Tukutuku (Turkiyah) invasion ===
The people of the southern Sudan had almost no contacts with the northern Sudan, until the beginning of Egyptian rule (also known as Turkish Sudan or Turkiyah) in the north in the early 1820s and the subsequent expansion of the slave trade into the south.

According to an oral history, the Nilotic peoples — the Dinka, Nuer, Shilluk, and others — had already established themselves in south Sudan by the time Turks invaded the region. In the nineteenth century, the Shilluk people had established a centralized monarchy which allowed them to conserve their tribal heritage in the face of external pressures in the years which followed the Turkish rule.

By the time the Nilotic peoples had established their dominium in the northern part of the southern Sudan (notably the Bahar El Ghazal region), the non-Nilotic Azande, Moru–Ma'di, etc., had established themselves in Equatoria region. The Azande people occupied the largest part of the region.

Geographical barriers sheltered the people of southern Sudan, and made it difficult for the Turks to invade the region. Moreover, the people of the southern Sudan were hostile to any foreign adventure in their land. But the military might of the Turkish army prevailed in the battles to subdue south Sudan. Because of their proximity to north Sudan, the Nilotic peoples were the first to give in to the Turkyiah.

As the Bahar El Ghazal region fell to the Turkish rule, many Nilotic people moved southward to escape from the new regime. The Turkish army also moved southward to extend its rule. By 1841 the Turkish armies had already entered Equatoria. Their first encounter were with the people of Bari, Kakwa, Pojulu, Mundari and others. When the Turks arrived in Bari, initially they were not met with hostility.

In April 1854, the relatively peaceful relationship between the Bari people and the foreigners came to an abrupt end, when a Turkish trader, without provocation, fired his guns into a crowd of Bari at Gondokoro. In anger the Bari mounted a counterattack, and the result was destructive to both sides. That incident made the Bari people to become more defensive and less friendly towards the traders (mostly Arabs and Turks) who used violent means to obtain ivory tusks, but also started taking people (young men and women) as slaves. Girls were raped, or taken as wives by force. Some of the foreign traders even built fortified warehouses near Gondokoro where people were kept waiting shipment down the White Nile to north Sudan.

In time the Turkish army was able gain complete control in Equatoria, with its trading headquarter now in Gondokoro. Next, the Turkish army then expanded its occupation further south. Consequently, the Madi, Kuku, Lotuko, Acholi and others whose territories lie south of Gondokoro were to fall prey.

Around 1854, the Tukutuku who had already taken over Gondokoro (a Bari town, north of present-day Juba), had also established a camp in Kajo-Keji (a town in Kuku territory). They used the base to mount attacks on the Maʼdi people across the Nile. The attacks of the Tukutuku were not limited on Lukai alone, but rather on the Madi people as a whole.

In eastern front, the Tukutuku had established a base in Obbo (a settlement, about a hundred miles southeast of Gondokoro). In the mid-1860s, the chief of Obbo was a man called Katchiba. As the Tukutuku consolidated its base in Eastern Equatoria, they managed to pull some natives (Bari and Acholi) to their side. With the help of the natives, they waged successful battles on the Maʼdi. For example, in one battle, the Tukutuku colluded with the Acholi-Patiko and Acholi-Palabe. They then attacked Mugali, captured chief Bada and took him to Lebubu (Odrupele) and slain him.

=== The Madi migration to Uganda ===
Given the superior military power of the Tukutuku and the assistance they got from the natives (who joined them), it was only a matter of time, they defeated the Maʼdi people. The Maʼdi people were forced to disperse. Some went deeper into the forests; others went further south, to Uganda. Those who were less fortunate were captured, and taken away. Some of those captured were later conscripted into the Tukutuku army; others became laborers.

When the Tukutuku consolidated its base in the Sudan, some of them went further south, and built some bases in Uganda. In Uganda, a group of Tukutuku camped in Odrupele (Lebubu). Tukutuku commander called, Emin Pasha, made the Madi and other ethnic groups (he conscripted into his army), to build a fort. The fort, today known as Dufile Fort, was completed in 1879. The fort is located on the Albert Nile, inside Uganda. Many of the laborers who built the forte were from Maʼdi people. The Madi people mostly live in Moyo, Oodrupele now.

In 1888 mutineers from Emin's Pasha jailed him and A.J. Mounteney Jephson. They later released the two and rallied to fight Mahdist forces. In 1889, Emin and his army abandoned Dufile Forte. The Belgian forces reoccupied and reconstructed it, from 1902 to 1907. Another group of Tukutuku army from the eastern front (which settled near Obbo) moved southward and settled in Faloro, a town in present-day Uganda. Faloro was part of Lado Enclave.

So by the late 1860s, several Maʼdi groups from Sudan had migrated to Uganda, where they settled in different places. Some in the west side of the Nile, others on the east. The southern territory of Maʼdi groups extended up to Faloro. Faloro was called Maʼdi Country, by the English explorers John Hanning Speke and James Augustus Grant, who visited the area in 1863 A.D. Sir Samuel White Baker, who visited the place also a year later also called Faloro Maʼdi Country

Several Ma'di groups from Moli, Kerepi, Arapi, Pageri, Loa, and Nimule settled in the Metu mountains. Some of the early settlers in Metu included the Padika group. Kerepi people arrived after Padika. In Metu, Kutulungu became the first chief of Erepi and Pamujo, in southern Metu. Lukere became the first chief of northern Metu. Other groups which came to Metu included Pacara and Vura. The first chief of Pacara was Lumara.

From Metu some members of the Vura group moved further west to Moyo district. In Moyo, the first chief of Vura was Aliku, the son of Bandai. Aliku ruled Moyo until the arrival of the British rule. The British arrested him. He was accused of killing an English explorer who came to Moyo. Aliku was taken to prison. He did not come back. It is believed he was killed.

Whereas the groups from northern and central Maʼdi settled in Metu, others went to Moyo. According to Madi oral history narrators (Albino Akasi, Samuel Anzo and Makpe), a group of migrants from Lulubo came to Uganda and settled southwest of Moyo. That group was called Maʼdi Agai, after their leader's name. The group was also called Maʼdi Okollo, meaning "Peripheral Maʼdi" because the group's dialect is rather different mainstream Maʼdi. The other Madi groups referred to Maʼdi Okollo, as Maʼdi Indri, because they owned many goats. One None-Madi ethnic group from the south, probably from Bunyoro came and settled near Maʼdi Okollo. The group was later called Maʼdi Oyuwi. Some Oyuwi members moved eastward and settled near Pakele.

In Sudan, the Bori also dispersed into groups. Some of them then went southeast, to Uganda. Others moved southwest. Those who moved southeast settled in Padibe, where they mixed with Acholi-Padibe and Acholi-Parabongo groups. Those who moved southwest crossed the Nile and settled in Metu. Like the other Maʼdi groups, the Lukai of Mugali also moved to Uganda. Many of them settled in Kitgum. Others settled in Adjumani.

=== The Madi people and Anglo-Egyptian Sudan ===
In the 1840s, Turkiyah (under the khedive of Egypt) had by now consolidated its control in Equatoria region. In 1845, a British man John Petherick who entered the service of Mehemet Ali, and was employed in examining Upper Egypt, Nubia, the Red Sea coast and Kordofan in an unsuccessful search for coal. In 1861, he was made a consul in Euqatoria region. Patherik was later to set his center in Faloro, Madi country.

In March 1861, a British explorer, Mr. Samuel Baker, started an expedition in central Africa, with the aim "to discover the sources of the river Nile". He also hoped to meet the East African expedition led by John Hanning Speke and James Augustus Grant, somewhere about the Victoria Lake. Baker spent a year on the Sudan-Abyssinian border, during which time he learned Arabic, explored the Atbara river and other Nile tributaries. In early 1862 he arrived at Khartoum, and in December the same year, he left the city to follow the course of the White Nile. Months later in arrived in Gondokoro.

In 1862, Speke and Grants who Mr. Baker planned to meet Mr Baker in Gondokoro, arrived in the Madi country, after traveling from Zanzibar passing through several countries: Abyssinia, Uganda, Gani... and Unyoro. In Madi country, the two were supposed to be met by Mr. Petherik, who was entrusted with a mission by the Royal Geographical Society to convey to Gondokoro relief stores for Speke and Grant. Petherick got boats to Gondokoro in 1862, but Speke and Grant had not arrived.

In February 1863, when the two man arrived at Faloro, Mr. Petherik went out for hunting and the visitors were met by of Mr. Mohamed (a black man) who was a vakeel (i.e. assistant consul). The explorers spent several weeks in the Madi country before going to Gondokoro. In his recollections about his stay, Mr Speke was to confess that the Madi people were civilized as compared to the people of Unyoro, Gani, Bari, etc. Mr Speke also recalled of stories about the Turkish slave traders who often clashed with the Madi people.

In April 1863, Samuel Baker finally met Speke and Grant at Gondokoro, who, told him about their discovering of the source of the Nile. The success of the two men made Baker to fear that there was nothing left for his own expedition to accomplish. Nonetheless the two explorers gave him information which enabled him, after separating from them, to achieve the discovery of Albert Nyanza (Lake Albert), of whose existence credible assurance had already been given to Speke and Grant.

After the meeting with Speke and Grant, Baker started his own expedition. He travelled from Gondokoro passing through the Bari, Latooka, Shooa, Madi countries. On the way he faced several hardship. In Latooka country, he stayed for several days, where he met with a Latooka chief, Mr. Bokke. He then continued southward and arrived at Obbo, which at a town of Madi Shooa country. In Obbo, he spent several weeks, where he met with chief of Obbo, Mr. Katchiba. Baker and Katichba discussed several topics.

On March 14, 1864, finally Baker arrived at Lake Albert. He spent several months in the exploration of the neighborhood before returning to his base. He arrived in Khartoum in May 1865. In the following October he returned to England with his wife, who had accompanied him throughout the whole of the perilous and arduous journey.

In 1869, at the request of the khedive Ismail, Baker undertook the command of a military expedition to the equatorial regions of the Nile, with the object of suppressing the slave-trade there and opening the way to commerce and civilization. Before starting from Cairo with a force of 1700 Egyptian troops - many of them discharged convicts - he was given the rank of pasha and major-general in the Ottoman army. Lady Baker, as before, accompanied him. The khedive appointed him Governor-General of the new territory of Equatoria for four years; and it was not until the expiration of that time that Baker returned to Cairo, leaving his work to be carried on by the new governor, Colonel Charles George Gordon.

In 1910, a few months after the death of Leopold II, the king of the Belgians, also came the demise of Lado Enclave (of which Madi territories were a part). This brought a new foreign rule to Maʼdi. In 1912, the British, now the new ruler of the region, arbitrary annexed southern Madi-land to Uganda. With the changes that occurred in both Sudan and Uganda, many Maʼdi migrants in Uganda, decided to go back to Sudan.

Many people from Nimule who settled in Atiyak and Kitgum went back. Some Bori people who settled Parabongo went back to Opari. Others stayed in Owinykibul. The Pageri moved from Ogoligo, in Uganda to Nimule. The elders in Nimule gave the Pageri group a place at foot of Mount Bolijo (now Mount Gordon). The settlement was named Pageri Andu. From Pageri Andu the group moved to northward and settled in Jelei. From Jelei the group settled in present-day Pageri area.

Most of Lukai people also went back to Mugali. However the conflicts between them and Acholi-Palabe continued. Maʼdi oral history narrator Lucia Nya-Tiangwa believes it was the conflict between the Lukai and Acholi-Palabe, which forced Lukai people back from Uganda to Mugali. The British administrators in the region believed the Lukai people were to blame. So one day an army from the Kings African Rifles (KAR) colluded with the Acholi. They came and attacked Mugali. They killed many people – several from the members from the Odrupee ruling family. People killed included Inyani, son chief Laziru Coro and Kaku, the mother of Chief Alimu Dengu.

To escape the massacre, the Lukai people ran to Ndindi, across River Acca, north of Mugali. Those events happened around year 1920. Amoli was the chief of Lukai. In Ndindi, Surur Iforo became chief of Lukai. He was given the task to take the people to a new place, which was more fertile and hospitable. He failed to achieve the task. So his cousin, Alimu Dengu forced Iforo to resign. Alimu Dengu became a chief. He then took the people to a place called Mua. It was also called Wangchori (in Acholi language), meaning, the eyes of man – a place of war.

In Wangchori, Lukai people lived for some years. Lubai replaced Alimu Dengu. After he died, Kasmiro Luku became a chief. Kasmiro died within a year. Laziru Coro became a chief. He ruled for nine months and resigned. Alimu Dengu became a chief, the second time. Lukai people then went back to Mugali. Those events happened around 1930-1945 A.D. The Anglo-Egyptian rule had now brought the Maʼdi chiefs under its control. In attempt to make it easy to rule the indigenous people, the British introduced the notion of paramount chief, who was to rule the whole of Maʼdi. That marked the end of the old era in Maʼdi history and the beginning a new era.

=== Madi people during the Second Sudanese Civil War (1983–2005) ===
Until 1986, to the Madi people the Second Sudanese Civil War, was a foreign story. It did not affect their daily life. Many of them only heard about the war from the radio or from hearsay. However, as the SPLA insurgents started moving southward, at one stage they reached the territories inhabited by the Madi people. One of their first encounters with the Madi people was in Owingibul.

In 1985, insurgent group claiming to be SPLA, robbed and plundered the villages in Owinykibul. Some people who witness the incident in Owingibul run to Nimule, to ask the government for help. To their disappointment they did not get the help they needed. The failure of the government to help them, forced the Madi people in Owingibul and others elsewhere, to consider taking the issue of their security into their hands. The incident in Owingibul also caused the Madi people to form the most negative opinion on SPLA/M.

Further encounters of the Madi people with SPLA soldiers in 1985, only served to harden the position of the Madi people against SPLA. Example, the looting of the property late chief Sabasio Okumu in Loa, the killing of a Madi man called Kayo Mojadia in Loa, the looting of the villages in Moli, made the Madi people to look at SPLA as an enemy and not as a liberation army. And since most of the SPLA soldiers who first came to Madiland were from the Acholi tribe, the Madi people started to look at the Acholi people as aggressors. Such a perception coupled with provocations on the Madi people by some elements in the Acholi tribe, was to breed an enmity between the two tribes, which led to conflicts resulting in dire consequences – for both sides.

The defining movement for the Madi people to take side in the conflict came early in 1986, when some insurgent group in SPLA uniform, killed in cold-blood, Mr. Joseph Kebulu, a very respected Madi politician. Mr. Kebulu was on his election trail, when the bus he was traveling with was stopped at Juba-Nimule road. The gun-men dragged him out of the bus and shot him.

Angered by what was happening to their people, and the inability the government to protect them, the Madi people decided to take things into their hand. So in March 1986, in Nimule, the council of Madi elders gathered to decide how to prepare to face further aggressions and plunders from SPLA in the Madiland. The meeting was chaired by Mr. Ruben Surur, then the chief of Lukai. The council unanimously selected Mr. Poliodoro Draru to lead the Madi people in the fight against the aggressors. The meeting was concluded by a traditional Madi ritual, during which Surur gave his ajugo (the biggest spear of a warrior) to Draru.

The choice of the council of elders who selected Draru as an ajugo, was not an accident of history. It was rather based on Draru's track-record in leadership. Moreover, both Surur and Draru came from the Lukai royal family. In fact Draru was the protégée of His Majesty Alimu Dengu. Draru was supposed to succeed Alimu Dengu, but for several reasons, he did not, so Alimu Dengu became the last King of the Madi people.

Years later, when General Joseph Lagu started the Anyanya movement, Draru wanted to be in the frontline. But General Lagu appointed Draru as intelligence officer. He worked hand in hand with [Mr. Angelo Vuga] (who was also an intelligence officer), in managing the logistics of Anyanya I, and also helped in recruiting young fighters - some of whom had to go to Israel for training.

Now as fate had, Draru had to be in the frontline. To prepare for the future battles, Draru and his chief advisor, Jino Gama Agnasi consulted General Peter Cirilo (of the Sudanese Army, then the governor of Eastern Equatoria) about the situation in Madiland who then gave his blessing for the Madi people to defend themselves. Thus a Madi militia was formed, led by Draru.

As the Madi militia was being was formed, in the meantime the geopolitical situation in the Sudan was changing so fast. The SPLA was becoming stronger as it captured more territories, not least, in Eastern Equatoria region. Moreover, some Madi people decided to join SPLA. Some of the Madi people who were first to join SPLA were Dr Anne Itto (who previously worked as a lecturer at the University of Juba), Mr. John Andruga, and Mr. Martin Teresio Kenyi. These people were later to hold high position in SPLA.

By joining SPLA, first Madi people in the movement thought to turn the SPLA from being the enemy of the people to the liberator of the people. But such as a tactical ploy was not bear the expected fruits. Instead, the Madi people became polarized. One group took side with Draru, the other group stood with SPLA. For example, in Moli clan, two brothers (Mr. Tibi and Tombe Celestino) took opposite sides in the war. Whereas Tibi joined SPLA, Mr. Celestino went with Draru.

The polarization of the Madi society was to bring the Madi society to conflicts in which the Madi people paid so heavily; many with their own lives. Only within a matter of three years (between 1986 and 1988), the Madiland which was very peaceful, became a war zone – a place of great tragedies. For example, in Moli area alone, many innocent people were murdered at river Liro, in resulting battles led by the two brothers: Mr. Tibi and Mr. Celestino. Initially Acholi-Madi clan also took side with the SPLA.

In 1988, realizing that the Madi and Acholi-Madi people had been taken in by the calamity brought by the polarization in the society, in order to stop further tragedies, the Madi and Acholi elders decided that the warring parties reach out to each other.

Consequently, Draru's group met his counterpart. Talks and negotiations were then followed by some sort of agreement. However, it seemed that the agreement between the two groups did not change the dynamics of things very much. On a national scale, the SPLA continued to become stronger, as the Sudanese government and the militias it supported were losing ground. In 1988, SPLA captured several strategic towns in Eastern Equatoria: Magwi, Obbo, etc. When it finally captured Torit, the capital city of Eastern equatorial, it became apparent that it was only matter of weeks, it will also capture Nimule.

So early in 1989 (on 3 March 1989 at 3:00 pm), An army of SPLA soldiers made its way to Nimule. However two days before it arrived Nimule, General Peter Cirilo, sent an urgent message to Mr Draru. He wrote, "It is over, please don't fight and destroy your people for the sake of Pyrrhic victory!" Draru listened to the senior General and didn't risk the lives of his soldiers and many Madi people. So Nimule fell to SPLA – without a big battle.

With the fall of Nimule, the militia led by Draru and even the ordinary Madi people fearing revenge from the SPLA soldiers, escaped to [Uganda]. The fear of the people was not to be unfounded; upon their arrival in Nimule, some SPLA soldiers murdered several civilians in cold-blood. However, as the SPLA established itself in Nimule, it leadership started to appeal to the Madi people who escaped to Uganda and elsewhere to come back home. Some of the Madi people listened to the appeal and came back. Others waited until the Comprehensive Peace Agreement between the Sudanese government and SPLA was signed before repatriating. Yet many Madi people decided to remain in Uganda, even after the CPA. Thus the second civil war, diminished the population of the Madi people in Sudan very considerably.

== Religion ==
=== Ori – the spirits of the reincarnated ancestors ===
Before the coming of Christianity and Islam to Madi, the predominant religion of Madi people was all about the belief in, and the worship of ancestors who were believed to survive death in form of spirits known as ori. It was believed that the ori could intervene directly in human affairs. Thus the Madi attribute every misfortune to the anger of a spirit and in the event of a misfortune or sickness, they would immediately consult an odzo or odzogo (spirit-medium) to find out which ancestor was behind the ordeal. Sacrifices were then offered to the particular spirit in order to avert its malign influence on the living. The powerful families among the Madi were believed to have powerful ancestral spirits to help them however with conversion of majority of Madi people to Christianity, and some to Islam, Rubanga - the Christian God and the Allah of Islam, took the places and roles which once belonged to the ori.

Nonetheless, today in the age where most Madi people have converted to the foreign religions, still some believers in the traditional Madi religion try to build a bridge between Rubanga and Ori. Today some Madi people still keep miniature altars called Kidori, were sacrifices are offered to the ancestral spirits in both in good and bad times as a way to approach God. Often at harvest time, the first harvest must be offered to the spirits to thank them for successfully interceding to God on behalf of the living.

=== Spirituality and the Madi Deities ===
Besides the belief in ori, the Madi people also believe in creatures, which are not the spirits of the reincarnated ancestors, but they are deities in their own right. Some of these deities are sacred trees, hills, rivers, snakes, etc. For example, among the Moli clan, Jomboloko (a tortoise who is believed to be living in a hill around Moli Tokuru hill), is well known deity. Many stories have been told about Jomoloko. Some Moli people still believe in Jomboloko. Also a small clan (pamangra)collected « rain stones »( ayi oni), that the clan leader(rain maker) would use to call upon the ancestors to bring fourth rain.In the pre-Christian age, it was common practice for a group of people believe in more than one deity. In that sense, some Madi people were polytheistic in their belief. However today, belief in those creatures diminished considerably.

=== Christianity ===
Christianity was first introduced to the Sudan, i.e. Nobatia (northern Sudan and part of Dongola), by a missionary sent by Byzantine empress Theodora in 540 AD. The second wave of Christianity to the Sudan came during the time of the European Colonialism. In 1892, the Belgian expediters took parts of southern Sudan that came to be named Lado Enclave (i.e. the western bank of Upper Nile region which is today the southeast Sudan and northwest Uganda). After the death of king Leopold II on 10 June 1910, the Lado Enclave, became the province of the Anglo-Egyptian Sudan, with its capital city at Rajaf. In 1912 the southern part of Lado Enclave become part of northern Uganda, which was also the British Colony. It was during that time the Madi people were divided into the Sudanese and Ugandan Madi. Christianity to the northern part of Lado Enclave was brought via Uganda at about the same time - as Colonialism always went hand in with Christianization

The notion God and the Madi word for it Rubanga, have very recent history. They came with Christianity. For example, in the Roman Catholic Catechesis in Madi language, when asked Rubanga ido oluka adu nga (How old is God), we're expected to answer Rubanga ido oluka ku (God has no beginning). And when asked Adi obi nyi ni oba nyi vu dri ni (who has created you and put you on the Earth), you are expected to answer Rubanga obi mani obama vu dri ni (God has created me and put me on Earth). And we are also asked to believe ta Rubanga abi le ati ri anjeli (the first things God created were angels).

Moving away from the Christian paradigm, if you are to go back in time, you reach beroniga. Before that there was nothing; the notions like time and space are void of meaning and content. Thus vu(space-time) came along with beronigo and all events and creation came after beroniga.

Now without the context of Christianity, in Madi cosmogony there is no say Rubanga obi vu ni. That cannot be the case since Rubanga came to Madi with Christianity, while vu (space-time) came about since beroniga. It is also erroneous to give the quality of goodness to vu since it hasn't any. Vu has always been at the mercy of the ori (the spirit gods). The ori, both good and bad often have their manifestations in trees, snakes, rivers, hills or the souls of departed parents and relatives. While tree-god may die, river-god may dry up, the ori which gave those entities the qualities of godness, never die - they reincarnate! It was at the kidori (stone altars) the Madi people worship ori. In Madi worship is called kirodi di ka (or sometimes vu di ka). When the ori are happy with the people they bless vu, and vu becomes friendly to the inhabitants.

=== Islam ===
The majority of the Madi people in Uganda are now Christians, while a small number are Muslim. Those in South Sudan are mostly Christians or follow traditional religions. Most Christian Ma'di are Roman Catholics with a small percentage who are Anglicans. However a plethora of new churches are springing up daily in the area. According to the 2002 Census of Uganda, 87.9% of Madi are Roman Catholic, 5.9% are Anglican, 4.1% are Muslim, 1% are Pentecostal and 0.6% follow other religions.

There is also a sizeable Muslim community, mostly of Nubi (in Uganda), especially in trading areas like Adjumani, Dzaipi and Nimule. See Juma Oris and Moses Ali. However, even the so-called 'people of the books' often revert to traditional beliefs and practices at traumatic moments. In addition some modern people continue to believe in traditional African religions.

The socio-political and cultural system

Governance, The social and political set-up of the Madi is closely interwoven with spirituality and this forms their attitudes and traditions. The society is organized in chiefdoms headed by a hereditary chief known as the Opi. The Opi exercised both political and religious powers. The rain-makers, land chiefs – vudipi (who exercises an important influence over the land) and the chiefs are believed to retain similar powers even after their deaths. There was a hierarchy of spirits corresponding exactly to the hierarchy of authority as it existed in the society. The Opi (Chief/King) is the highest Authority in Madi, he is followed in rank by the community of elders who are responsible for resolving disputes, in the clans/villages. Historically the office an opi has always been held by a man. There is no record of a female opi.

Legend has it that in the past, a person only needed a seed of grain to pound to provide a meal for a whole family. One day, when the farming population had gone to their farms and the blacksmiths as usual were left all alone at home, greed took hold of them. They wanted more than the single seed the farming community gave them for their services. So on this fateful day, they stole and pounded a mortarful of grain. The gods reacted swiftly and harshly to this disobedience; a single grain seed was never again to be enough. Human beings had to (toil harder for an ever decreasing yield per grain seed. When twins are born, the first of the pair is called opt 'chief (or the related form opia for a female) and the second of the pair is eremugo 'blacksmith' (or muja for a female second twin). The blacksmith is there to provide for the chief.

The main economic activity that the Ma'di have traditionally engaged in is agriculture. The prevalence of tsetse fly depleted the livestock population at the end of the nineteenth century. Almost the whole population live off the land planting and growing mostly seasonal food crops like sesame, groundnuts, cassava, sweet potatoes, maize, millet and sorghum. Most of these are for personal consumption; only the excess is sold for cash. The main cash crops grown are cotton in Uganda and tobacco in the Sudan.

Those who live close by the Nile do some fishing for commercial purposes. The main fishing grounds are Laropi (Uganda) and Nimule (South Sudan). Most of the fish caught in Nimule is smoke dried and transported to be sold in Juba, the capital of South Sudan. An important seasonal activity used to be hunting. This has dwindled in importance partly because of curbing of hunting by governments, and partly because Nimule is designated as a National Park, making it illegal to hum in or around it. The hunting season used to be the dry season when most of the agricultural activities for the year have been completed and the grass is dry enough to be burned.

Blacksmiths have a particular significance in regard to the Ma'di. The Ma'di were at one time associated with the 'Ma'di hoc', which was once used as currency in marriages by both the Ma'di and the neighbouring tribes like the Acholi. who call it kweri ma'di 'Ma'di hoe. This was made by the blacksmiths (eremu). However, the Ma'di have low opinions of the blacksmiths, despite the important economic role they play in the society. They are thought to be a lazy lot who spend the whole day in the shed while the rest are toiling in the hot sun. They are also blamed for the fall of mankind from grace.

== Social customs ==
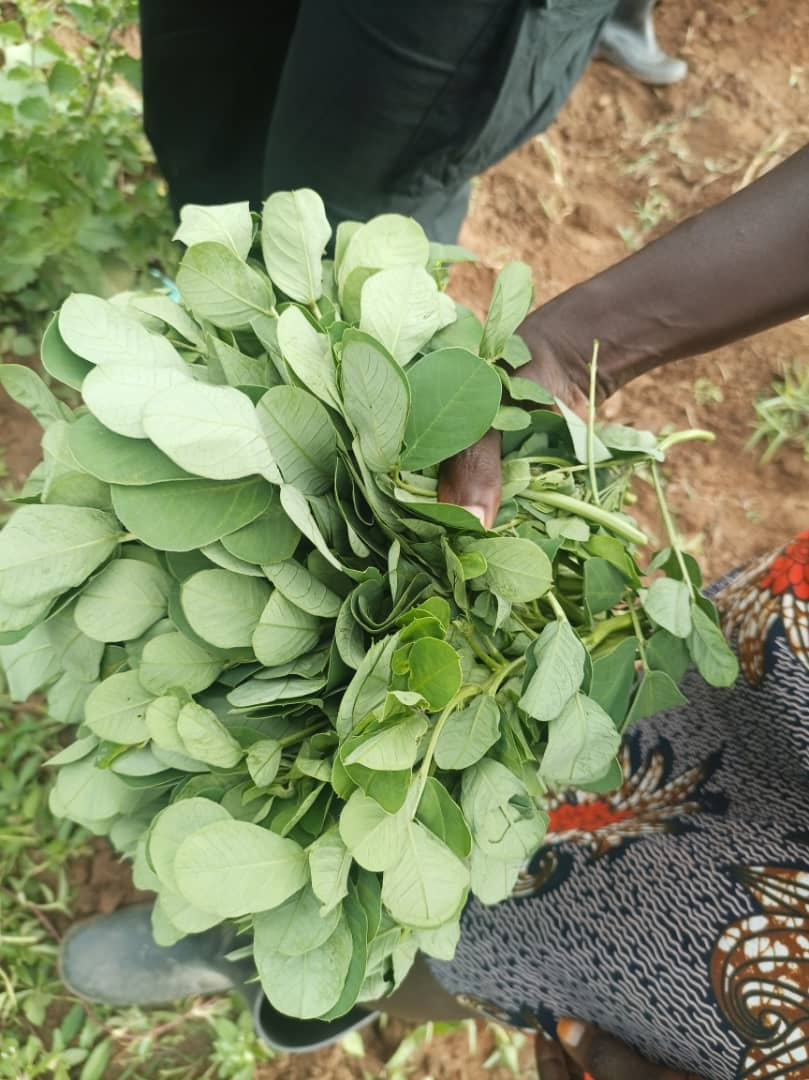
Luge a traditional green vegetables of the Madi culture

The Madi society is established on the notions of clans and kinship under traditional rulers which all the subjects in the same geographical area pay their allegiance. There are clan and village leaders and family units who ensure that law and order within communities are kept and maintained socially, people do not worry within close relations, communal field work, feasts, hunting and funerals take place which brings about consolidation of unity, cooperation and peace. Marriages normally take place in churches, in homes of bridegrooms and in the government Administrators office. Traditional shrines are respected. Hereditary rulers and their spouses are buried in those sacred places (rudu).

== Dances ==
- Mure — the dance of celebration and mourning. It is often danced during celebration (of events such: a victory in war, the birth of a king, etc.) and mourning (the death of king, loss of land during war, etc.). Mure is often danced to the tune of the sounds of wooden trumpets (ture, odiri), animal horns (pkere, bila), mgbiri (dancing bells), and drums (leri). At mure dance, men sporadically utter bellows (sira soka). Every cira is unique and carries coded message. A sira is normally used as sign of identification and authority. Women (often the wives of the men who utter cira) would answer with their own bellow (Gbilili) as sign of recognition and reverence. During mure, war songs (jenyi) are often sung - specially when the Madi people at war. Jenyi could even be sung during the time of battles, accompanied by the sounds of sira, ture and pkere, by Madi warriors to encourage themselves and to threaten the enemies to surrender or escape.
- Gayi — a youth flirtation dance similar to flamenco.
- Kore — a graceful dance
- Kejua — mostly danced by women

== Notable Ma'di individuals ==
- Joseph Lagu, Vice President (Sudan), leader of Anyanya
- Maku Iga, director general, Uganda External Security Organisation
- Anyama Ben, Board Chairman, National Animal Genetic Resource Center and Data Bank (NAGRIC), Board Member, Uganda Registration Services Bureau (URSB), LC 5 Chairman, Adjumani District Local Government.
- Redonto Unzi, Deputy Speaker in Sudan Parliarment - early 1960s

Gen. Martin Kenyi Terenzio - SPLA liberation fighter, founder of EDF (Equatoria Defence Force) - deceased

- Moira, the war hero of Madi who fought for the Madi people
- Aluma David, one of the famous musician known as Trey David
- Mzee Gwanya, One of the famous Muzician of UDI.
- Abraham Kiapi, former Professor of Law at Makerere University for 22 years (1971-1993) He died in 1993 and was buried in Moyo District. He wrote several law books and he was an authority on Constitutional and Administrative Law.

== Important tourist attractions ==
In Uganda there are substantial earthworks of a fort at Dufile which was built in 1879 by Emin Pasha close to a site selected by Charles George Gordon in 1874; Dufile was originally used as a port for steamers and is today passenger ferries link it to Nimule. In the Sudan, there is the Nimule national park, and the Fula Rapids, which may become a major provider of hydro-electricity for the whole region.

== See also ==
- Ma'di language
- Moru- Madi languages
- Central Sudanic languages
- Acholi people
- Bari people
- Kakwa people
- Lado Enclave
- Dufile Fort
- Nimule National Park
- White Nile
