= Aringa language =

Central Sudanic language of Uganda

Aringa
- Ãrị̃ngã tị
- Native to: Uganda
- Region: Aringa county, Yumbe District
- Ethnicity: Aringa
- Native speakers: 495,000 (2014 census)
- Language family: Nilo-Saharan?: Central Sudanic; East; Moru–Madi; Central; Aringa
- Dialects: Andre; Kuluba; Lebati
- Writing system: Latin

Language codes
- ISO 639-3: luc
- Glottolog: arin1244

Aringa, also known as Low Lugbara, is a Central Sudanic language or dialect spoken by the Aringa people in the West Nile region of Uganda. It is related to the languages spoken by the Lugbara and Maʼdi peoples.

Aringa is sometimes considered a dialect of Lugbara language, other times a separate language. The speakers of Lugbara and Maʼdi both consider Aringa to be a separate but related language. There are several divergent dialects: Andre, Kuluba, and Lebati.
