= Adroanzi =

Guardian spirit in Lugbara mythology

Adroanzi ('Adro-children') are a group of nature and guardian spirits in Lugbara mythology.

The Adroanzi are described as the children of Adroa, God of the Lugbara, though some versions of the myths describe them as the children of Adro, the dark and earthly aspect of Adroa. They are also sometimes described as the spirit of the dead.

They are the guardian spirits of the dead, and are also nature spirits who frequent lakes, rivers, streams, large trees, and rocks. They also guard rain groves. They like to follow humans at night, and if a human would turn back and look at the Adroanzi, they would be killed. If left undisturbed, they were seen as helpful spirits, who would protect travelers from robbers, animal predators and other dangers.

They have the form of small men and women. They were also described as having the form of water snakes, and would drown and eat humans.
