= Olu'bo =

Olu'bo may refer to:

- the Olu'bo people
- the Olu'bo language
