= Gborogboro and Meme =

Gborogboro ('The person coming from the sky') and Meme ('The person who came alone') were twins and the first man and woman in Lugbara mythology.

Gborogboro and Meme were a pair of twins created by the supreme god Adroa. The twins were created and lived in a place called Loloi, which was located near Juba in modern-day Sudan. Gborogboro was associated with the heavens while Meme was associated with the earth. Wild animals were said to be born from Meme's womb, with a gazelle bursting from her womb first, followed by the other animals.

The twins married each other and produced another set of boy-girl twins. The twins' offspring then produced another set of boy-girl twins, and this iteration goes on for several generations, with the number of generations and their names differing between myths. In at least one version, the names of the generations are given as Arube and O'du, Jokodra and Lebenyeru, and Yeke and Angbau. The method of conception also differs. In some version, the baby was placed into Meme's womb by Adroa. In other versions, the twins had sexual intercourse, or became pregnant through the pouring of goat's blood between the female's legs.

== Jaki and Dribidu ==
Eventually, the hero-ancestors Jaki and Dribidu were produced by the last generation. The siblings could perform superhuman and magical feats. Dribidu ('The hairy one') was covered in hair, and he was also known as 'Banyale ('Eater of men') as he was known to eat his own children. He was ultimately exiled for his cannibalism, and died at Mount Eti, while Jaki died at Mount Liru.

The siblings were involved in several fantastical myths, one of which involved them curing a woman who had leprosy and then having sexual relations with her. This led to a dispute with the woman's kin, resulting in a war breaking out. The dispute was settled with a fine that was paid to her kin along with a dowry. This was said to be the origin of warfare and the practice of dowry. The siblings wandered the plains producing children with different women, who would become the ancestors of the Lugbara people.

== In Astronomy ==
The crater Gborogboro on Rhea, a moon of Saturn, is named after Gborogboro.
