= Maʼdi language =

Central Sudanic language

Maʼdi
- Maʼdi ti
- Region: Uganda, South Sudan
- Ethnicity: Madi
- Native speakers: (310,000 cited 1982–2002)
- Language family: Nilo-Saharan?: Central Sudanic; Eastern; Moru–Madi; Southern; Maʼdi
- Dialects: Moyo; Adjumani (Oyuwi); Lokai; Ɓurulo; Pandikeri (they are also found in Acholi)

Language codes
- ISO 639-3: mhi
- Glottolog: madi1260

Maʼdi (pronounced [màɗɨ́]) is a Central Sudanic language spoken in Uganda and South Sudan. It is one of the Moru–Madi languages. The Madi people refer to their language as Maʼdi ti, literally "Maʼdi mouth".

The Maʼdi people are found in Magwi County in South Sudan, and in Adjumani and Moyo districts in Uganda. Their population is about 390,000 (90,000 in South Sudan).

Maʼdi is mutually intelligible with Oluʼbo, Lugbara, Moru, Avokaya, Kaliko and Logo, all of which are also Moru–Madi languages.

== Sociolinguistics ==
Most Maʼdi people are bilingual. In Uganda, the educated class speaks English as the second language and some also speak Swahili. In South Sudan, the educated Maʼdis speak English and/or Arabic. The South Sudanese Maʼdi also speak Juba Arabic, spoken in South Sudan and not understood in the North. The form of Juba Arabic spoken by the Maʼdi is influenced by the Nubi language spoken in Uganda among Muslims who are mainly descendants of Gordonʼs troops. Loanwords in Ugandan Maʼdi are therefore mainly of English and/or Swahili origin and in Sudanese Maʼdi of English and/or Juba Arabic origin.

There is an interesting linguistic interaction between the Maʼdi, the Acholi and the Kuku. Many Maʼdi speak Acholi but hardly any Acholi speak Maʼdi. This is possibly because during the first civil war in the Sudan, most Sudanese Maʼdi were settled among the Acholi in Uganda. Possibly for the same reasons, most Kukus speak fluent Ugandan Maʼdi, but hardly any Maʼdi speak Kuku. It is still possible even today to find among the Sudanese Maʼdi people who can trace their ancestry to the neighbouring tribes – Bari, Kuku, Pajulu, Acholi, etc. Hardly any of them can now speak their ancestral languages; they speak Maʼdi only and have become fully absorbed into the Maʼdi community.

Crazzolara claims that there are linguistic traces of Maʼdi found in Nilotic languages like Dinka (especially Atwot), Nuer and Lwo (Acholi, Alur and Lango) and among the Bantu (Nyoro and Ganda). There are also some claims which maintain that there are Acholi speaking clans in Pakele in Adjumani (in Adjumani District), whose Maʼdi accent is said to be completely different from that of the other Maʼdi in the area. In Adjumani itself, the Oyuwi (ojuwt) clans are said to speak three languages: Maʼdi, Kakwa and Lugbara.

== Phonology ==
Maʼdi is a tonal language, which means that meanings of words depend on the pitch. There are three tone levels (high, mid and low). The language has a number of implosives: /ɓ/ (ʼb), /ɗ/ (ʼd), /ʄ/ (ʼj), /ɠɓ/ (ʼgb). There are a number of secondarily (/kʷ/) and doubly articulated sounds (/ɡb/, /kp/) in addition to the singularly articulated sounds (/f/, /v/). The language also has glottal stops (/ʔ/), which can be found word medially and initially.

=== Consonants ===
Consonants in Maʼdi
		Labial	Alveolar		Palatal		Velar		Labial– velar	Glottal	
		Labial	plain	labial	plain	labial	plain	labial	Labial– velar	plain	labial
Plosive	voiceless	p	t	tʷ			k	kʷ	kp	ʔ	ʔʷ
Plosive	voiced	b	d	dʷ			g	gʷ	gb		
Plosive	prenasalized	ᵐb	ⁿd	ⁿdʷ			ᵑg	ᵑgʷ	ᵑᵐɡ͡b		
Implosive		ɓ	ɗ		ʄ				ɠɓ (ɓʷ)		
Affricate	voiceless				tʃ	tʃʷ					
Affricate	voiced				dʒ						
Affricate	prenasalized				ⁿdʒ						
Fricative	voiceless	f	s							h	(hʷ)
Fricative	voiced	v	z								
Fricative	prenasalized	ᶬv									
Nasal		m	n		ɲ		ŋ		ŋm (mʷ)		
Trill			r	rʷ							
Approximant			l	lʷ	j				w		

=== Vowels ===
There are ten vowels in the language, conveniently though inaccurately transcribed as +ATR /a, e, i, o, u/ and −ATR /ʌ, ɛ, ɨ, ɔ, ʊ/. This convention was chosen for "visual clarity" and only approximates the phonetic values.

[-ATR] vowels in Maʼdi
.	Front	Central	Back
Close	ɨ		ʊ
Mid	ɛ		ɔ
Low		ʌ	

[+ATR] vowels in Maʼdi
	Front	Central	Back
Close	i		u
Mid	e		o
Low		a	

== Orthography ==
Currently there are two systems used in writing Maʼdi, categorised as the old and the new system. The old system completely ignores tones, making reading more difficult. The old system also uses only five vowels (a, e, i, o, u). The new systems employs ten vowels (see the tables on the previous section). It also identifies four tones: high (close), mid, low and falling.

/ɠ͡ɓ/ is also written <ʼgb>

== Works in Maʼdi ==
Printed material in Maʼdi is scarce. The only general published works in Maʼdi are missionary publications such as the translation of the New Testament, and prayer and song booklets by the Catholic missionaries. The Maʼdi Ethnic and Heritage Welfare Association in Britain publishes a quarterly bilingual (English and Maʼdi) paper called Maʼdi Lelego.

In the spring of 1998, Radio Uganda began regular broadcasts in Maʼdi.

== Bibliography ==
- Aʼbabiku, Rose. A Key History of Maʼdi.
- Blackings, Mairi; Fabb, Nigel (2003). A Grammar of Maʼdi. Mouton de Gruyter. ISBN 3-11-017940-7.
- Blackings, Mairi (2011). Maʼdi English - English Maʼdi Dictionary (2nd ed.). Lincom Europa. ISBN 9783862880539. OCLC 748104528.
- Fuli, Severino (2002). Shaping a Free Southern Sudan: Memoirs of our struggle. Loa Parish: Loa Catholic Mission Council. OCLC 50912733.
