= Lugbara =

Lugbara may refer to:

- Lugbara people
- Lugbara language
