= Aringa =

Aringa may refer to:

- Aringa people
- Aringa language
- Aringa County
