= Adroa =

Supreme god or spirit of the Lugbara people of central Africa

Adroa is the supreme god or spirit of the Lugbara people of central Africa.

Adroa is a god they worship, and this aspect of the god was known as Adroa 'ba o'bapiri ('God the creator of men'). Adroa was said to have created the first man, Gborogboro, and the first woman, Meme. Gborogboro and Meme were also twins, and they were considered the ancestors of the Lugbara. Adroa is also credited with the establishment of social order, by communicating his laws to the tribal ancestors of the Lugbara.

Adroa has two main aspects, Adroa the good (Lugbara: onyiru), and Adro the bad (Lugbara: onzi). These two dual aspects can be further broken down into different smaller aspects. Adroa, the good aspect, is transcendent and far-removed from mankind. This aspect is sometimes called Adronga or Adrogoa. This aspect includes Adroa in different roles, including Adroa 'ba o'dupiri ('God the taker away of men') as a death deity and Adroa 'bija ('God in the sky'), a sky deity. Adro, the bad aspect, was described as tall, white and only having half a body, and he travels by jumping around on one leg. He is described as earthly, and dwells on the earth along with mankind, especially in rivers. Adro is usually invisible, but will appear to those who are close to death, and is thus also associated with death. Adro was worshiped through child sacrifice, but since the 1930s a ram was substituted as the victim. Some versions do not consider Adro to be the evil equivalent of Adroa, but as a class of earthly spirits who are "refractions" of the good aspect. Both Adroa and Adro are part of a Lugbara man, as a sign of divine creation. In this aspect, the Adroa is also known as Tali. Women are thought to have no Tali. Upon a man's death, the Adro aspect was thought to leave his body, rejoining with Adro in the rivers and becoming Adroanzi. Meanwhile, Tali rejoins Adroa in the sky.

== See also ==
- Lugbara mythology
