= Morokodo people =

Morukodo
Total population
- 42,000

Regions with significant populations
- Western Equatoria

Languages
- Morukodo

Religion
- Animism

Related ethnic groups
- Madi

The Morukodo are an ethnic group numbering over 40,000 people living in the South Sudanese state of Western Equatoria. They speak Morokodo language, a Central Sudanic language
