= Moru–Madi languages =

Cluster of Central Sudanic languages

Moru–Madi
- Geographic distribution: South Sudan, Uganda, and the DRC
- Linguistic classification: Nilo-Saharan?: Central Sudanic; Eastern; Moru–Madi

Language codes
- Glottolog: moru1252

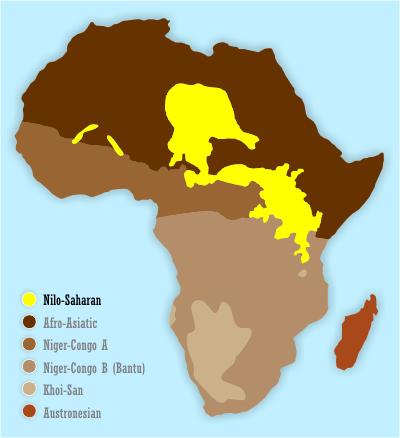
Map showing the distribution of Nilo-Saharan languages.

The Moru–Madi languages of the Central Sudanic language family are a cluster of closely related languages spoken in South Sudan, the Democratic Republic of Congo, and Uganda. Moru is spoken by 100,000 people, and Maʼdi is spoken by twice that number. The most populous languages are Aringa of Uganda, with close to a million speakers, and Lugbara, with 1.6 million.

== Languages ==
The languages in this cluster are found across three countries: Uganda (Maʼdi, Lugbara, Aringa, S. Maʼdi); South Sudan (Aringa, Maʼdi, Loluʼbo, Avukaya, Kaliko, Moru, and Logo); and the Democratic Republic of Congo (Lugbara, Avukaya, Kaliko, and Logo).

- Moru (Waʼdi variety divergent)
- Avokaya
- Keliko
- Omi
- Lugbara
- Okollo–Ogoko–Rigbo
- Logo
- Aringa (Lower Lugbara)
- Maʼdi (Moyo, Adjumani (Oyuwi), Pandikeri, Lokai, Burulo dialects)
- Oluʼbo (Lolubo)

== The name Maʼdi ==
The name Maʼdi is used for various peoples in the region. There is a tendency, especially in the Acholi region of northern Uganda, to refer to anyone from West Nile Region as a Maʼdi, even the Kakwa. The only group in this region who are never called Maʼdi are the Alur.

Joseph Pasquale Crazzolara, for example, states that "all Logbara [...] agree that they are of the Maʼdi nation, that they are Maʼdi. They are called Maʼdi by the Alur of Okooro, their immediate neighbours, in Bunyoro and Buganda." Similarly, the linguist A. N. Tucker described the neighboring Keliko people who occupy the high plateau near the Logbara, as having the "real name Maʼdi". However, the Keliko regard themselves as Keliko rather than as Maʼdi.

== Comparative vocabulary ==
Sample basic vocabulary of Moru–Madi languages from Boone & Watson (1996):

Language	Dialect	eye	ear	nose	tooth	tongue	mouth	blood	bone	tree	water	eat	name
Moru	Kâdiro	mi	bi	kʊmvʊ	si	laɖa	kala	kari	kʊwa	cɛ	jǐ	ɔɲa	ʌvuru
Moru	Lakamadi	mi	bi	kʊmvʊ	si	laɖa	kala	kari	kʊwa	icɛ, cɛ	jǐ	ɔɲa	ʌvuru
Moru	Miza	mi	bi	kʊmvʊ	si	laɖa	kala	kari	kʊwa	icɛ, cɛ	jǐ	ɔɲa	ʌvuru
Moru	Âgyi	mi	bi	kʊmvʊ	si	laɖa	kala	kari	kʷa	icɛ	ìjí	aɲa	ru
Moru	Ândri	mi	bi	imvʊ	si	laɖa	kala	ari	fā	ifɛ	ìjí	ɔɲa	ru
Moru	ʼBâriʼbâ	mi	bi	imvʊ	si	laɖa	kala	ari	kʷa	ifɛ	ìjí	ɔɲa	ru
Moru	Waʼdi	mi	bi	kʊmvʊ	si	laɖa	ti	kari	kʷa	cɛ	ìjí	aɲa	ru
Avokaya	Sudan	lìfí	bí	ɔ̀mvɔ̄	sí	lànɖā	tī	àrɪ́	fà	fɛ̄	lùmvū	ɲà	rú
Avokaya	Zaïre	mǐfí	bí	ɔ̀mvɔ̄	sí	làɖā	tī	àrɪ́	fà	fɛ̄	yǐ	ɲà	rú
Logo	Ogambi, Doka, Lolia, Obeleba, Bhagira	mì	bí	kɔ̀mvɔ̄	sí	làɖā	tī	kàrɪ	fà	fā	yǐ	ɲā	rú
Logo Bari	Kanzako	mìkífí	ɓí	kɔ̀mvɔ̄	sí	làɖā	tī	kàrɪ̄	fà	fɛ̄	yǐ	ɲā	rú
Logo Bari	West	mì	bí	kɔ̀mvɔ̄	sí	làɖā	tī	kàrɪ̄	fà	fɛ̄	yǐ	ɲā	rú
Logo Bari	Mandra	ɲɛ̌fɪ́	ɓí	ɔ̀mvɔ̄	sí	làɖā	tī	àrɪ́	fà	fɛ̄	ɛ̀yí	ɔ̀ɲā	rú
Kaliko	Maʼdi-Didi	mì, mīfí	bí	ɔ̀mvɔ̄	sí	àɖā	tī	kàrɪ́, àrɪ̀	fà	fā, fʌ̄tī	yǐ	ɲā	rú
Kaliko	Southwest	mī, mīfí	bí	ɔmvɔ̄	sí	àɖā	tí	àrɪ́	fā	fɛ́	yǐ	ɲā	rú
Kaliko	Rapaʼba	mī	bí	ɔmvɔ̄	sí	ālāɖā	tɔ́gʊ́	àrɪ́	fà	fɛ́	yǐ	ɲā	rú
Kaliko	Maʼdi-Dogo	mīfí	bí	ɔ̀mvɔ̄	sí	àɖā	-	-	-	pʌ̀tì	yǐ	ɲā	rú
Kaliko	Southeast	mī	bí	ʊ̀mvʊ̄	sí	áɖā	tī, tí	àrɪ́	fà	peti	yǐ, ìjí	ɲā	rú
Kaliko	Omi	mǐfà	bí	ɔ̀mbɔ̄	sí	àɖā	tī	àrɪ́	fàlágɔ́	fʌ̄tī	yǐ	ɲā	rú
Okollo		mule	bí	ōmbʊ́	sí	áɖā	tílɛ́	àrɪ́	cɔ̀ɔ́	pʌ̄tí	yǐ	ɲá	rú
Ogoko		mìfī	bí	ɔ̀mvʊ̄	sí	ɪ́ɖɛ̄	tī	àrɪ́	cɔ̀kɔ́	pàtí	yǐ	ɲà	rú
Lugbara	Zaire (Lu, Zaki, Abedzu)	mìlɛ̄	bí	ɔ̀mvū	sí	aɖa	tī	àrɪ́	fàlákɔ́	pʌ̄tí	yǐ	ɲa	rú
Lugbara	Uganda (Vurra, Ayivu)	mīlɛ́	bí	ɔ̀mvʊ̄	sí	āɖɛ̄	tī	àrɪ́	fàlákɔ́	pʌ̄tí	yǐ	ɲa	rú
Maracha		mìfī	bí	ɔ̀mvʊ̄	sí	ɛ̄ɖɛ̀	tī	àrɪ́	fàlákɔ́	pʌ̀tí	yǐ	ɲá	rú
Terego		mìfī	bí	ɔ̀mvʊ̄	sí	ɛ̄ɖɛ̄	tī	àrɪ́	fàlákɔ́	pàtíkè	yǐ	ɲá	rú
Aringa		mīfí	bílé	ɔ̀mvʊ̄	sí	ɪ̀ɖā	tī	àrɪ́	ìfà	ɪ̀fɛ́	ìjí	ɲá	rú
Maʼdi	Uganda	mī	bí	ɔ̀mvɔ̄	sí	lɛ̀ɖá	ti	àrɪ́	hʷa	kʷɛ	èyí	ɲā	rú
Maʼdi	Lokai	mí	bí	ɔ̀mvɔ̄	sí	lɛ̄dá	tí	àrɪ, ari	kʷà	kʷɛ̄	ēyí	ɲā	rú
Maʼdi	Pandikeri	mí	bí	ɔ̀mvɔ̄	sí	lɛ̄dá	tí	ɛ̀rɪ	kʷà	kʷɛ̄	īyí	ɲā	rú
Lulubo		mī	bí	ɔmbɔ̄	sí	lɛ̄dā	tī	ɛ̀rɪ̄	kʷā	kʷɛ̄	īyí	ɲā	rú
