= Joseph Pasquale Crazzolara =

Joseph Pasquale Crazzolara (12 April 1884 – 25 March 1976) was a Christian missionary in Africa, an ethnologist and a linguist.

== Works ==
- Outlines of a Nuer Grammar (1933)
- A Study of the Acooli Language (1938)
- The Lwoo (1950–54)
- Zur Gesellschaft und Religion der Nueer (1953)
- A Study of the Logbara (Ma'di) Language (1960)
- A Study of the Pokot (Suk) Language (1978)

== Bibliography ==
- Vittur, Franz (2005). P. Pasquale Crazzolara e la sua Africa: la storia di un missionario comboniano (in Italian). S. Martin de Tor (Bolzano): Istitut ladin Micurà de Rü. ISBN 978-88-8171-063-8. OCLC 61201626.
