= Logo people =

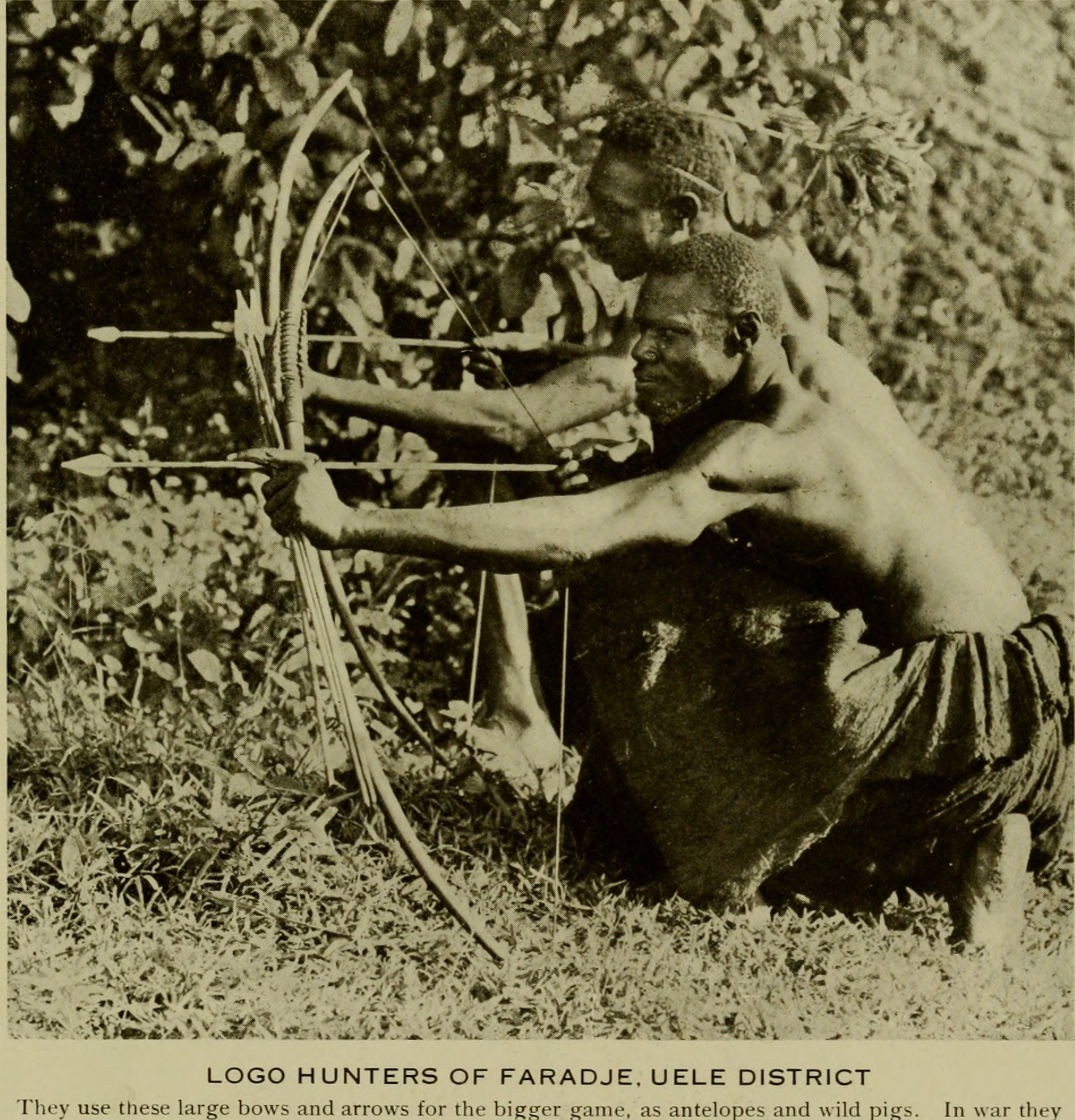
- Logo hunters in Faradje

Total population
- c.200,000

Regions with significant populations
- Democratic Republic of the Congo (Haut-Uélé); Uganda; South Sudan

Languages
- Logoti, Lingala, English

The Logo people or Logoa (plural) are an ethnic group of Nilotic origin who live predominantly in the north-east of the Democratic Republic of the Congo as well as parts of western Uganda and southern South Sudan. There are believed to be more than 200,000 people who identify as ethnically Logo of whom most live in the Congo's Faradje Territory, a remote region in Haut-Uélé Province, where they form the ethnic majority. Logo people also live in Watsa and Aba, both also in Haut-Uélé, and in Yei in South Sudan.

The ethnic group is traditionally associated with the Logo language, known as Logoti, from the Nilo-Saharan family. The language has an estimated 210,000 speakers. A further 100,000 speak the related dialect known as Ogambi. Logoti is similar in derivation to the Nilotic Kaliko, Bari, and Lugbara languages spoken in the same region. The word logo means "human being" in the local language.

Historically, the Logoa were less powerful than the important Mangbetu and Azande ethnic groups in the same region. Originating in Sudan, the Logoa were progressively pushed southwards into their current territories around Faradje by rival ethnic groups and especially expanding Azande influence in the 19th century. Their remote location within the Congo meant that they were however able to avoid becoming subject peoples. The Logoa are divided into a number of tribal units and do not form a single polity. According to anthropologist Jan Vansina, the territory occupied by the Logoa and the Avukaya ethnic group forms a distinct geographic unit.
