= Lugbara mythology =

The Lugbara live in the Democratic Republic of the Congo, Uganda, and South Sudan. Their number totaled approximately 240,000, with around 180,000 residing in north-western Uganda, with the remaining population spread across bordering areas of the modern-day Democratic Republic of Congo and South Sudan. The Lugbara people speak in a Sudanese language. The basic social and economic unit found in Lugbara culture is a lineage group under the authority of a male genealogical elder called ba wara, meaning "big man". These lineage groups, often referred to as sub-tribes, typically lived in a village built atop a hillside or ridge. In addition to the male elder, other religious leaders include diviners, oracles, and rain men.

== Creation Myth ==
Lugbara believe that they are all of one blood, ari alo, and that blood was created by God, Adronga 'ba o'bapiri. Whilst there are many different versions of the Lugbara creation myth, most agree that God created the first beings Gborgboro and Meme at Loloi to the North in South Sudan. Gborgboro and Meme had two children together, Arube and O'du. The siblings and subsequent siblings had children together for several generations. The last pair of siblings were the parents of the hero-ancestor Jaki.

Other versions of the creation myth explain the separation of God and mankind in the sky, the separation of black and white people, the building of a tower of Babel. Furthermore, they explain the appearance of the Lugbara and Kakwa peoples as well as the various tribes and languages of the world. Some versions also explain the creation of the world as it is today.

== Hero-ancestors ==
Lugbara mythology has two hero ancestors, Jaki and Dribidu. Whilst both of their stories share similarities, they are not related to one another and entered the Lugbara Highlands independently of one another. Both shared superhuman and magical abilities and were the first rain makers. In addition, they shared their knowledge of magical medicines with their descendents. Furthermore, their many sons became the founders of the original Lugbara clans.

Jaki entered the Lugbara highlands from the north and north-west, where the Kakwa people reside today.

Dribidu, 'the hairy one', had long hair covering most of his body. He is also referred to as Banyale, 'eater of men', because he ate his children until he was discovered and forced to leave his home on the east bank of the Nile. He traveled through the Nile valley at East Madi in eastern Uganda, and crossed the river at Gimara, entering the Lugbara Highlands.

Both hero-ancestors died on mountains overlooking the Lugbara plains. Jaki on Mount Liru, and Dribidu on Mount Eti.

Both Jaki and Dribidu have myths about how they both found a leper woman who provided him with fire to cook. In both myths, they cure the woman using a medicine that has since been forgotten and in the end, they marry her.

== God in Lugbara Mythology ==
There are many different names for God in Lugbara mythology. John Middleton (1955) wrote that the Lugbara believe that God has two aspects, one transcendent and the other immanent. The transcendent aspect is often referred to as Adroa or Adronga whilst the immanent aspect is referred to as Adro.

Adroa appeared in both good and evil aspects; he was the creator god and appeared on Earth as a man who was near death. He was depicted as a very tall white man with only one half of a body, missing one eye, one leg, etc. His children were called the Adroanzi.

The Adroanzi were nature gods of specific rivers, trees and other sacred wild areas. At night, they followed people and protected them from animals and bandits as long as they did not look over their shoulder to ensure that an Adroanzi was following; if the person did so, the Adroanzi killed them. They ate the people they killed. They were also sometimes known as water snakes. Some Lugbara consider them gardeners.

== Key figures in Lugbara Mythology ==
Adronga 'ba o'bapiri, or God creator of men, created the first beings on Earth, Gborgboro and Meme, as well as creating domestic livestock. God is also referred to as Adro or Adroa.

Gborgboro, means 'the person coming from the sky'. He was created by Adronga 'ba o'bapiri, along with Meme. Father of O'du and Arube.

Meme, means the person with a big body. In some versions of the Lugbara creation myth, Meme is a man but in most she is a woman. She was created by Adronga 'ba o'bapiri, along with Gborgboro. Wild animals came from her womb, the gazelle broke out first and the other animals followed. After the animals had left her womb, she bore two children, O'du and Arube, a girl and a boy.

O'du, means miraculous omen. She was one of the first set of siblings and was born with teeth. Some versions of the myth say she and Arube are the same person.

Arube, means maker of miracles. He was one of the first set of siblings and was born with teeth. Some myths say he is the same person as O'du.

Yeke, means owner of the land. He was the first man to settle and farm land and was the father of Jaki, one of the hero-ancestors.

== Rites of Sacrifice Among the Lugbara ==
Due to extreme variations in culture in different Lugbara groups, there is not one clearly defined rite of sacrifice, nor consistently shared ritual behaviours. Offerings and sacrifices are typically made at a selection of shrines located both near and inside the home, designed to honour the dead and other spirits. Sacrificial rites are an activity that is distanced from regular religious behaviour associated with the Lugbara. There are four rites of sacrifice that occur most commonly across Lugbara:

The first is rua edezu, or cleansing the body. There are several scenarios in which the rua edezu rite may be enacted. A common case is to cleanse sickness from the body of a man who has had a disagreement with a member of his family who has died before the disagreement could be resolved. It is believed that sickness is likely to strike the child of the sick man if he is to take the widow of the dead man. It can be determined that the sickness was sent by Divine Spirit after consultations with oracles and then diviners. The ritual is performed by the patrilineal elder, in which a sheep is assigned to the sick man. The sheep is then walked the perimeter of the sick man's home, given a "ritual address", then killed and eaten by members of the lineage group. A similar rite called angu edezu, meaning cleansing the territory, may be performed in the occurrence of a pregnancy outside of marriage or persistent disagreements.

The second rite is ori owizu, a sacrifice to patrilineal ghosts. This sacrifice is also made as a result of sickness. An animal, such as a goat, ox, bird or most commonly, a sheep, is assigned to the sick person and blessed by an elder. After the sick person has recovered, the animal is killed in their home and divided into three portions; the first portion is given to the dead by placing the meat at their shrines; the second is eaten by the lineage group; the third is taken home to be given to more distant lineage members. The recovered person is then blessed with breath and spit through the use of leaves, then the meat is eaten.

The third rite is an offering given to Divine Spirit. This act is called a'izu, meaning to pray or to beseech. This is an offering given in order to receive rain or to remove an epidemic. In this ritual, a rainmaker adorns a white ram with beads that were once owned by a man who has since died of a disease such as meningitis. The ram is first led in a circle around the entire territory of the lineage group and then chased over a river into mountains by the rainmaker. It is believed that the ram transforms into a leopard and then into rain. Contrary to other rituals, the dead are not involved and there is no direct killing of the animal. A human who had been disembowelled atop a hill was the original offering in this sacrifice and the sheep is the modern replacement.

The fourth rite is an offering to the spirits. This category of Lugbara rite is the most varied across the Lugbara people. In Lugbara religion, spirits are believed to be "in the air", and thus there is no set place where these offerings must occur. It is believed that only diviners are capable of communicating with spirits and offerings are performed by them by entering a trance in a dark hut far from the village. The offering is typically performed near a river, as they are places of great spiritual power. The diviner will offer food and drink to the spirits, such as milk and grains. These offerings take place after a spirit is thought to have communicated with the living either by sending illness or through possession of a person's body.

== See also ==
- Lugbara language
- Lugbara people
- Lugbara proverbs
