= Fongoro language =

Central Sudanic language of Chad

Fongoro
- Formona
- Gele
- Native to: Chad
- Ethnicity: 1,000 (2007)
- Native speakers: a few elders (2007)
- Language family: Nilo-Saharan?: Central Sudanic; Sara–Bongo–Bagirmi; Fongoro

Language codes
- ISO 639-3: fgr
- Glottolog: fong1243
- ELP: Fongoro

Fongoro, or Gele, is a nearly extinct Central Sudanic language of uncertain classification spoken in Chad and formerly in Sudan.
