= Doba language =

Central Sudanic language spoken in Chad

Doba
- Native to: Chad
- Native speakers: (140,000 Mango and Gor (2006); 36,000 Bedjond cited 1969)
- Language family: Nilo-Saharan?: Central Sudanic; Bongo–Bagirmi; Sara; Doba
- Dialects: Bedjond; Gor; Mango

Language codes
- ISO 639-3: Variously: bjv – Bedjond (Nangnda) mge – Mango gqr – Gor
- Glottolog: bedi1236

Doba is a Central Sudanic language of Chad. It is traditionally considered three languages, because it is spoken by three ethnicities with separate identities, the Bedjond, the Mango, and the Gor. However, all have a high degree of mutual intelligibility, and so by that standard are a single language.

Doba is the name of the town which is the center of the Mango people, and is used by linguists as a cover term for the three dialects.

The number of speakers is uncertain, as the latest figure for the Bedjond, 36,000, dates from 1969. Figures for the Gor (87,000) and Mango (52,000) date from 2006.

Bedjond is also spelled Bediondo and Bejondo, and is also known as Bediondo Mbai, Mbay Bejondo, and Nangnda. Dialects are Bedjond, Bébote, and Yom.

Gor is also known as Bodo; Bodo and Yamod are dialects.

Mango is also known as Mongo, Doba, and Mbay Doba.
