= Lugbara proverbs =

Lugbara proverbs locally known as E'yo O'beza refers to wisdom from the Lugbara people passed down by grandparents, parents and other relatives to younger generations since time immemorial through stories, parables, idioms and simple phrases, usually around a bon fire. In modern times though, due to formal education, it's not a celebrated activity but elders still teach and advise the young in their day to day encounters. Below are some examples (the English translation) and: meaning.

== Wise sayings ==
Afa ei ma drikulu (The owner has a big head): The owner has the biggest say in what to do with his property.

Aparaka ma tibi agobi / Eka eyo 'du aparakasi, mi isu afazi ku (Unseriousness feeds on pumpkin leaves/ If you take things jokingly, you don't get anything): Unseriousness misses out on the good things!

Ata a'bua ri, le mima nga azi raka mima nya ndo (Even in the valley plantation, you must first work before you eat): No work, no food!

Awoko so ti andre (Anger pierced the cow's tongue): Don't get angry or else you will get hurt!

Ayia ma ndu yo (There is no other mother): Cherish your mother, there is no other woman who can replace her!

Ayia nduri ozuku fi ni (A stepmother is [like] a porcupine's intestines): Stepmothers are usually bitter.

'Ba azini ma afasi 'ba ze oli oli (Because of someone else's things, you defecate air): If you rely on another man's things, you won't enjoy fully nor have peace of mind!

'Ba je obuka mva alea si ku (You cannot buy a baby strap because of an unborn baby): Similar to the English proverb: Don't count your chicks before they hatch!

'Ba yori ni 'ba je oku ku (For an absent person, you cannot buy a wife)

E'bu/ Aco si aza oye ku (Using the hoe is not madness for nothing): When you cultivate, you harvest something. So whatever you do, expect a benefit!

Embeleke ka i-agi ma iti ne, eri gu sibe imve (When an ape sees its friend's behind, it laughs with white teeth showing): Don't laugh at other people's shortcomings! Afterall, you also have yours.

Eri mi te era liri etia (It is waiting for you under the high granary): If you don't listen now, you will meet issues later on in future.

Ezo anzi inguleni angu vo re (Girls slash very far): If girls are found and married, they don't stay; they are taken but prepare a way for their relatives to go to a new place. Girls are like slashers and can go and marry anywhere.

Mi owu lesu i-adapibori si ku (Do not cry because of spilt milk): Whatever has already happened cannot be changed, let bygones be bygones!

Nyatu li odjimata (Too much eating cut the baboon): Odji was sitting on a tree branch and ants were flying in circles. He picked ants one by one but greed in his mind made him jump to catch the whole circle and he fell. This teaches us to do everything sparingly and not greedily.

O'bi'biasi eto ma jo ve ra (Because of copying, the hare's house got burnt): Be yourself!

Ocoo ini ri atuluku dria (A black dog is sitting on the kitchen-stove): No food will be cooked nor eaten tonight.

O'di'dia nya puro ibi (Newness ate raw grasshoppers): A stranger or somebody new in a place can be made to do anything.

Odru fu Anira ni te (The buffalo killed the man who thought he knew it all)/ Ajobe odru fu ni (Ajobe was killed by a buffalo)/ And(r)era ni odru fu ra (The one who claimed he had seen was killed by the buffalo): Listen to advice!

Okuku dra drinza si/ Drinza si, okuku dra o'boa (The tortoise died of shyness)/ Due to shyness, the tortoise died in its shell: Life saving opportunities will pass you by because of shyness.

Pati ifi i'deni re ku (The seed of a tree doesn't fall very far): A parent's behaviour can be reflected in his/ her children.

Sindani tokoa bongo sozuri ka di tajiri nde (A mere cloth-sewing needle can defeat a rich man to own): Poor people are actually wealthier than rich people in certain aspects.

== See also ==
- Lugbara language
- Lugbara people
