= Logo language =

Central Sudanic language of DR Congo

Logo
- Logoti
- Native to: Democratic Republic of the Congo
- Region: Orientale Province, Democratic Republic of the Congo
- Ethnicity: Logo people
- Native speakers: (210,000 cited 1989)
- Language family: Nilo-Saharan?: Central Sudanic; East; Moru–Madi; Central; Logo
- Dialects: Ogambi; Doka; Lolya; Obilebha; Bhagira; Bari
- Writing system: Latin

Language codes
- ISO 639-3: log
- Glottolog: logo1259

Logo is a Central Sudanic language spoken in the Democratic Republic of the Congo by 210,000 people in 1989 according to SIL.
