= Aringa people =

Ethnic group in northwestern Uganda

Total population
- 500,000+

Languages
- Aringa

Religion
- Sunni Islam

Related ethnic groups
- Lugbara

The Aringa are a Central Sudanic ethnic group primarily residing in the rural areas of Yumbe District, located in the northwestern corner of Uganda. They are also found in other regions of the West Nile sub-region. The Aringa people are considered the indigenous inhabitants of their lands, which were later settled by a group known as the "Nubians." Their language, also called Aringa, belongs to the Central Sudanic language family. According to the 2024 Census of Uganda the Aringa numbered 945,100 people. https://statistics.ubos.org/nphc/drilldown?subregion=34&district=313

== History ==
The Aringa are one the indigenous communities of Uganda as at 1st February 1926. They are united and belong to several clans and sub clans such as the Aringa, Renda, Geya, Yumbe, Lomunga, Mechu, etc. In the 1970s, the Aringa, along with the neighboring Kakwa people, faced accusations from various groups in Uganda for their involvement in carrying out the actions of Idi Amin, who was a Kakwa himself. Mustafa Adrisi, an Aringa, served as Amin's vice president. After the Uganda-Tanzania War and the downfall of Amin's regime in 1979, the Aringa people became targets of persecution by the joint forces of the Uganda National Liberation Army (UNLA) and the Tanzania People's Defence Force. Consequently, many Aringa individuals scattered, seeking refuge in the Democratic Republic of the Congo, Sudan, and various parts of Uganda. As a result, Aringa county was nearly depopulated until some individuals began returning to their villages eight to ten years later.

In 1980, when the UNLA replaced the Tanzanian occupying forces, the UNLA engaged in brutal reprisals against the local civilian population, who were perceived as supporters of former Amin forces. During this time, former Amin forces, including the Uganda National Rescue Front, primarily composed of Aringa individuals, launched incursions from southern Sudan, driving some UNLA units out of the West Nile region. The Former Uganda National Army, composed primarily of Kakwa individuals, also participated in these incursions. In response, the UNLA carried out further reprisals, resulting in widespread destruction of property and massacres in Arua and Moyo Districts. This violence forced an estimated 500,000 West Nile civilians, including Aringa people, to flee to Sudan. Many remained in refugee camps in Sudan until the late 1980s when the National Resistance Army assumed power in Uganda. In 1987, Sudan People's Liberation Army rebels attacked and burned the camps, compelling the refugees to return to Uganda.

== Religion ==
In terms of religion, the majority of Aringa people adhere to Islam, while a small number follow Christianity. Traditionally, the Aringa were hunters and cultivators, and they engaged in small-scale livestock rearing for subsistence purposes. However, in recent times, many Aringa individuals have pursued business ventures, residing in urban areas while their families remain in the villages to care for children and maintain large households.

== See also ==
- Acholi
- Teso
- Alur
- Karamojong
