= Moru language =

Central Sudanic language of South Sudan

Moru
- Kala Moru
- Region: South Sudan
- Ethnicity: Moru
- Native speakers: 230,000 (2017)
- Language family: Nilo-Saharan?: Central Sudanic; East; Moru–Madi; Moru

Language codes
- ISO 639-3: mgd
- Glottolog: moru1253

Moru is a Central Sudanic language spoken in South Sudan by the Moru people. Dialects are Agi, Andri, ʼBaliʼba, Kadiro, also known as Lakamaʼdi, Miza and Moruwaʼdi.

== Demographics ==
A 2013 survey reported that ethnic Morokodo reside in Kozi and Ngode Bomas, Kozi Payam, Maridi County, South Sudan.Moru resides in Loi Jambo Bangolo and Kediba as there is no Moru tribe in Maridi County but rather Morokodo tribe

== Literature ==
The Moru language has been maintained through the use of the language in the church, particularly the Episcopal Church of the Sudan (ECS). A number of editions of the Prayer Book (Buku Mätu Ro) and the hymn book (Buku Loŋgo ro) have been published over the years.

The Moru primer Kito Lusi ro Luka be was first published in 1953 and has been reprinted many times since. This is primarily a primer for use in schools. An adult literacy primer Buzevosite was also produced in the 1970s and published by New Day Publishers in Juba. This primer, in keeping with the strong Christian commitment of the Moru people, has a Christian theme.

The New Testament and Psalms, Taobaro Toʼdi, was first published in 1951. The full Moru bible, Baibolo Alokado, with both the Old Testament and the New Testament was published by the Bible Society in Sudan in 1999.

In 1981 a collection of local folk tales was published in Moru Kediro in the form of two booklets, one of which is available as a pdf file on the internet: Kitoŋwa Tauniʼba yi and Kitoŋwa ʼdi Odoʼba yi.
