= Fula Rapids =

Waterfall in Eastern Equatoria, South Sudan

Fula Falls
- Fula Rapids
- Location within South Sudan
- Location: Nimule, Eastern Equatoria, South Sudan
- Coordinates: 3°40′23.23″N 31°58′29.31″E
- Watercourse: Nile

Fula Rapids or Fula Falls is a waterfall located on the White Nile in South Sudan around 6.5 kilometers north of Nimule Town in Eastern Equatoria State, near South Sudan's border with Uganda.

The government of South Sudan plans to build its main hydroelectricity power station on the Fula Rapids, but the project has been delayed due to the insecurity in the country since 2013.
