= Omi language =

Central Sudanic language of DR Congo

Omi
- Native to: Democratic Republic of the Congo
- Region: Orientale Province
- Native speakers: 91,000 (2005)
- Language family: Nilo-Saharan?: Central Sudanic; East; Moru–Madi; Central; Omi

Language codes
- ISO 639-3: omi
- Glottolog: omii1238

Omi is a Central Sudanic language, spoken in the Aru Territory, Orientale Province, Democratic Republic of the Congo, between the two rivers Nzoro and Lowa. It was once considered a dialect of the Keliko language, but requires separate literature.
