= Oluʼbo people =

Oluʼbo is a Central Sudanic ethnic group in the Equatoria region of South Sudan. They speak the Oluʼbo language as their mother tongue. They are also known as the Lulubo people by their neighbors, but their preferred self-designation is Oluʼbo. The population of this group may exceed 10,000. Most persons in this minority are not Muslim, although some are.
