= Lugbara people =

Central Sudanic ethnic group

Lugbara
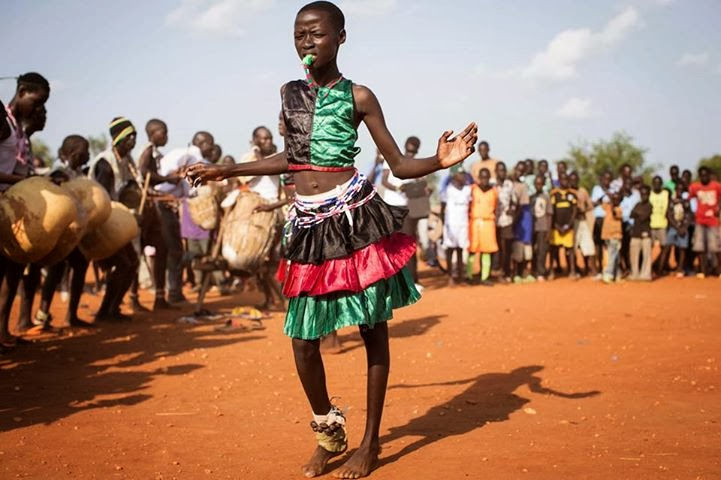

Total population
- 2,091,000

Regions with significant populations
- Uganda: 1,099,733 (2014)
- DR Congo: 646,000
- South Sudan: 10,000

Languages
- Lugbara language, English language

Religion
- Christianity, Islam, Lugbara mythology

Related ethnic groups
- Avukaya, Logo, Aringa, Keliko, Omi, Olu'bo, Madi and other Central Sudanic peoples

The Lugbara are a Central Sudanic ethnic group who live primarily in the West Nile region of Uganda, in the adjoining area of the Democratic Republic of the Congo (DRC) with a few living in South Sudan. They speak the Lugbara language, Lugbara ti, a Central Sudanic language similar to the language spoken by the Madi, with whom they also share many cultural similarities.

== Traditions and culture ==
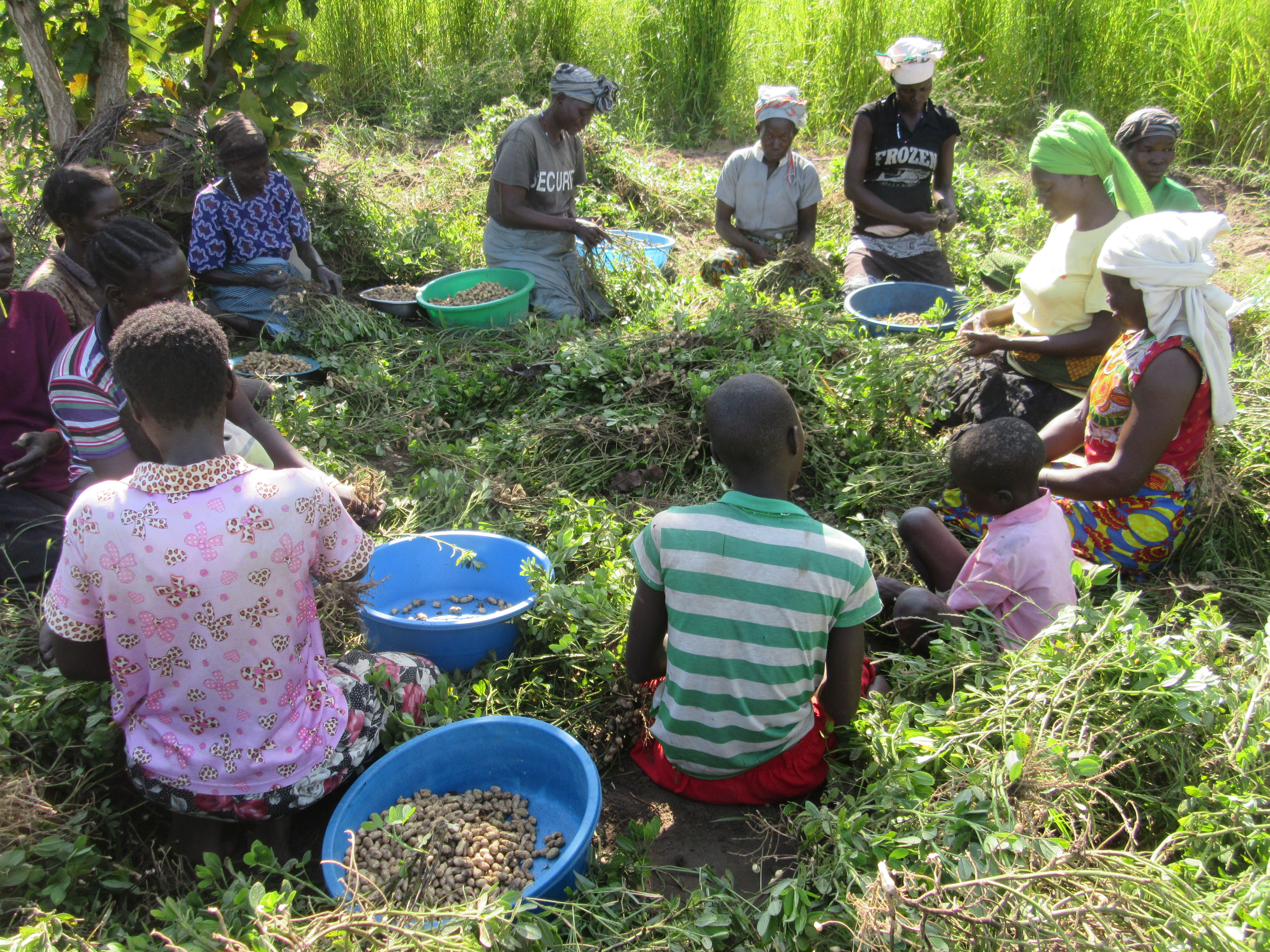
A group of Lugbara women harvesting groundnuts.

Traditionally, the Lugbara are farmers who rear some livestock and poultry, mainly guineafowl locally known as ope; they are the predominant keepers of guineafowl in Uganda. Lugbara occupy the West Nile region of Uganda (Arua City, Arua, Maracha, Terego, Madi-Okollo, Yumbe and Koboko districts of Uganda to be specific). The Lugbara are divided into many dialects which are easily understandable to each other. These include: Ayivu, Maracha, Terego, Vurra and Aringa. Tribes related to the Lugbara in language include Madi and Kaliko in South Sudan. The Lugbara also have a special name-giving ceremony called Cikiri every time a child is born.

In the early days, the Lugbara were a mainly chiefdom-based community. They did not have kingdoms and kings presiding over them like other ethnic groups in Uganda. They mainly had chiefs who were their leaders. They formed friendly alliances with neighboring tribes so as to ensure their security against attacks from other ethnic groups. The earlier Lugbara did not have soldiers or a standing army in their chiefdoms. Every able-bodied man had the duty to protect his village hence all able-bodied men were automatically considered a soldier though this was not a permanent duty. The Lugbara were originally animists as their mythology attests. However, Christianity is now the predominant religion amongst them with Islam another major religion. According to the 2002 Census of Uganda, the majority of Lugbara people at around 48.6% are Roman Catholic, while 21.4% are Anglican and 29.1% are Sunni Muslim.

They are settled subsistence farmers. Cassava is now the traditional staple. They also grow millet, sorghum, legumes, pigeon peas, beans and a variety of root crops. Before cassava was introduced to the Lugbara to manage famine when the cereals millet and sorghum failed due to drought in the 1960s; millet and sorghum used to be their staple food. Chicken, pigs, goats, and at higher elevations, cattle are also important. Groundnuts, Simsim [sesame], chick peas and sweet potatoes are also grown. Maize is grown for brewing beer, and tobacco is a very important cash crop. Emerging cash crops are avocado, pineapple, and mangoes.

In early days of 1874 the North Eastern side of the Democratic Republic of Congo, a faction of the Lugbara were called "The Naked People", due to their attitude towards clothing. Most women did not wear shirts and many of them did not wear even dresses, but they were covered with grass skirts or leaves. Taller than many Congolese, the Lugbara men are great hunters as well, using powerful bows with long arrows that have fishing hooks type tips.

This ethnic group straddles the common border between Uganda and the Democratic Republic of Congo with the majority of their population in the Congo side of the border. Some live in South Sudan.

A collection of the proverbs of the Lugbara have been published, and also a description of how their proverbs relate to ethics. The same author has described other parts of traditional Lugbara customs and society.

Famous and well known Lugbara include Dorcus Inzikuru, the 3000-metre steeple chase world champion in Helsinki 2005 and Jackson Asiku, the previous Commonwealth boxing light-weight champion. Another important Lugbara is John Munduga, an international boxer plus Idi Amin Dada, former president of Uganda mostly remembered/ known for expelling the Asians.

The cultural symbol of the Lugbara is a leopard with 300 spots.

== Notable people ==
- Dorcus Inzikuru
- Jackson Asiku
- Idi Amin Dada
- John Munduga

== See also ==
- Lugbara cuisine
- Lugbara language
- Lugbara mythology
- Lugbara proverbs
