= Keliko language =

Central Sudanic language of DR Congo and South Sudan

Keliko
- Kẹ̃lị̃kọ́
- Region: South Sudan, Democratic Republic of the Congo
- Native speakers: (42,500 cited 1989–2018)
- Language family: Nilo-Saharan?: Central Sudanic; East; Moru–Madi; Central; Keliko

Language codes
- ISO 639-3: kbo
- Glottolog: keli1248

Keliko (Kaliko) is a Central Sudanic language of the Democratic Republic of the Congo and South Sudan.

Omi was once considered a dialect.

== Locations ==
A 2013 survey reported that ethnic Keliko reside in the following bomas of Morobo County, South Sudan. (Morobo County was reported to have a majority of ethnic Kakwa people.)

- Alutu Boma (Wudabi Payam)
- Nyei Boma (Wudabi Payam)
- Yugufe Boma (Lujule Payam)
- Kendre Boma (Lujule Payam)
- Kembe Boma (Lujule Payam)

Ethnic Keliko are also found in Yei County, in Asole Boma (Lasu Payam).

== Writing ==
Keliko is written in a Latin-based alphabet with frequent use of apostrophe, as well as the extra letters ẹ, ị, ŋ, ọ, and ụ and several digraphs and trigraphs. Diacritical marks are frequently used for marking tone.

Small	Capital
a	A
b	B
ʼb	ʼB
c	C
d	D
ʼd	ʼD
dr	Dr
e	E
ẹ	Ẹ
f	F
g	G
gb	Gb
h	H
i	I
ị	Ị
j	J
k	K
kp	Kp
l	L
m	M
mb	Mb
mgb	Mgb
mb	Mv
n	N
nd	Nd
ndr	Ndr
ng	Ng
nj	Nj
ny	Ny
ŋ	Ŋ
ŋm	Ŋm
o	O
ọ	Ọ
p	P
r	R
s	S
t	T
tr	Tr
u	U
ụ	Ụ
v	V
w	W
ʼw	ʼW
y	Y
ʼy	ʼY
z	Z
ʼ	

=== Marking tone ===
- High tone: marked by acute accent, e.g. tị́.
- Mid tone: unmarked
- Low tone: marked by tilde above, e.g. drã
