= Oluʼbo language =

Central Sudanic language of Southern Sudan

Oluʼbo
- Loluʼbo
- Native to: South Sudan
- Ethnicity: Oluʼbo
- Native speakers: 33,000 (2017)
- Language family: Nilo-Saharan?: Central Sudanic; Eastern; Moru–Madi; Southern Madi; Oluʼbo
- Writing system: Latin

Language codes
- ISO 639-3: lul
- Glottolog: olub1238

Oluʼbo or Loluʼbo is a Central Sudanic language spoken by 33,000 Oluʼbo people in Southern Sudan.

== Phonology ==
=== Consonants ===
Consonants
		Labial	Dental	Alveolar	Post- alveolar	Retroflex	Palatal	Velar	Labial- velar	Glottal
Implosive		ɓ		ɗ			ʄ			
Plosive/ Affricate	voiceless	p	t̪		tʃ	ʈ		k	kp	ʔ
Plosive/ Affricate	voiced	b	d̪		dʒ	ɖ		g	gb	
Plosive/ Affricate	prenasalized	ᵐb	ⁿd̪		ⁿdʒ	ᶯɖ		ᵑg	ᵑᵐgb	
Fricative	voiceless	f		s						
Fricative	voiced	v		z						
Approximant				l			j		w	

=== Vowels ===
Vowels
	Front	Back
Close	i	u
Near-close	ɪ	ʊ
Close-mid	e	o
Open-mid	ɛ	ɔ
Open	a	

Vowels form two vowel harmony sets, based on advanced and retracted tongue root. The [−ATR] group is commonly transcribed as /ɪ, ɛ, ɔ, ʊ/, and the [+ATR] group as /i, e, o, u/. /a/ is phonetically [−ATR] but is found in roots of both sets.

There is a tenth vowel quality [ɤ], which only occurs after /u/. When /u/ and [ɤ] are in separate morphemes, [ɤ] is in free variation with [o].

=== Tones ===
Oluʼbo has high /˦/, mid /˧/, and low /˨/ tones.There are also six compound tones, low-mid /˨˧/, low-high /˨˦/, mid-low /˧˨/, mid-high /˧˦/, high-low /˦˨/, and high-mid /˦˧/.
