= Lugbara language =

Language of the Lugbara people

Lugbara
- Native to: Uganda, DR Congo
- Ethnicity: Lugbara
- Native speakers: 1.6 million (2014 Census)
- Language family: Nilo-Saharan?: Central Sudanic; Eastern; Moru–Madi; Central; Lugbara
- Writing system: Latin

Language codes
- ISO 639-3: Either: lgg – Lugbara snm – Southern Maʼdi
- Glottolog: lugb1240 Lugbara sout2828 S. Maʼdi

28 Letters of the Simplified Lugbara Alphabet

Lugbara, or Lugbarati, is the language of the Lugbara people. It is spoken in the West Nile region in northwestern Uganda, as well as the Democratic Republic of the Congo's Orientale Province with a little extension to the South Sudan as the Zande or Azande people.

== Classification and dialects ==
The Aringa language, also known as Low Lugbara, is closely related, and considered a dialect of Lugbara, although the 1996 constitution of Uganda considers it as a different tribe from Lugbara. In fact, among the Lugbara of Uganda, it is one of the five clans (Ayivu, Vurra, Terego, Maracha and Aringa). Some scholars classify the Lugbara language itself as a dialect of the Maʼdi language, though this is not generally accepted. An SIL survey report concluded that the Okollo, Ogoko, and Rigbo dialects, called "Southern Maʼdi", should be classified as dialects of Lugbara.

== Phonology ==
=== Vowels ===
	Front	Central	Back
Close	i		u
Near-close	ɪ		ʊ
Close-mid	ɛ ~ e		ɔ ~ o
Open-mid	ɛ ~ e	(ʌ)	ɔ ~ o
Open		a	

- /ɛ, ɔ/ can also be heard as [e, o] as a result of vowel harmony.
- /a/ can have an allophone of [ʌ] when after sounds /k, ɡ/.

=== Consonants ===
		Labial	Dental		Alveolar	Postalv./ Palatal	Velar	Labial- velar	Glottal
		Labial	plain	trilled	Alveolar	Postalv./ Palatal	Velar	Labial- velar	Glottal
Nasal		m			n	ɲ	(ŋ)		
Plosive/ Affricate	voiceless	p	t	tʳ	t͡s ~ t͡ʃ		k	k͡p	ʔ
Plosive/ Affricate	voiced	b	d	dʳ	d͡z ~ d͡ʒ		ɡ	ɡ͡b	
Plosive/ Affricate	prenasal	ᵐb	ⁿd	ⁿdʳ			ᵑɡ	ᵑᵐɡ͡b	
Plosive/ Affricate	implosive	ɓ			ɗ				
Fricative	voiceless	f			s				h
Fricative	voiced	v			z				
Fricative	prenasal	ᶬv			ⁿz				
Trill					r				
Lateral					l ~ ɺ				
Approximant	plain				l ~ ɺ	j		w	
Approximant	preglottal					ˀj		ˀw	

- /l/ varies dialectally as a lateral flap [ɺ].
- /t͡s, d͡z/ vary dialectally as [t͡ʃ, d͡ʒ].
- /tʳ, dʳ/ can be retroflex [ʈɽ, ɖɽ] with free variation.
- /ʔj/ can be implosive [ʄ] and /ⁿz/ can be [ⁿd͡z] with free variation.
- A labial affricate [p͡f] may occur with dialectal variation, [ŋ] only rarely occurs among different dialects.

14 Consonant Clusters in Ugandan Lugbara (though four have silent letters that can be trimmed)

== Orthography ==
Lugbara was first written by Christian missionaries in 1918, based on the Ayivu dialect. In 2000, a conference was held in the city of Arua in northwestern Uganda regarding the creation of a standardised international orthography for Lugbara.

The Simplified Lugbara alphabet has 28 letters. there is no q or x, and there are four letters for glottalized consonants, namely: ʼb as in ʼbua, ʼd as in ʼdia, ʼw as in ʼwara, and ʼy as in ʼyeta.

== In education ==
In 1992, the Government of Uganda designated it as one of five "languages of wider communication" to be used as the medium of instruction in primary education; however, unlike the other four such languages, it was never actually used in schools. More recently it was included in the curriculum for some secondary schools in the West Nile region, including St. Joseph's College Ombaci and Muni Girls Secondary School, both in Arua District.

== Vocabulary ==
=== Numbers ===
Number	Translation
0.	Toko/ ogbo
1.	Alu
2.	Iri
3.	Na
4.	Su
5.	Towi/ tawu
6.	Azia
7.	Aziri
8.	Aro
9.	Oromi
10.	Mudri/ modri
11.	Mudri drini alu
12.	Mudri drini iri
13.	Mudri drini na
20.	Kali iri
21.	Kali iri drini alu
22.	Kali iri drini iri
23.	Kali iri drini na
30.	Kali na
40.	Kali su
100.	Turu alu
500.	Turu towi
900.	Turu oromi
5,000.	Alifu towi
4M.	Milioni su
7B.	Bilioni aziri
12T.	Trilioni mudri drini iri

=== Greetings and other phrases ===
Lugbara	English
Mi ifu ngoni?	How did you wake up?/ Good morning!
(Mi) ngoni?	How (are you)?
(Ma) muke!	(I'm) fine!
Ma azoru!	I'm sick!
Mi aa ngoni?	How did you stay?
Ayiko ni ma fu!	Happiness is killing me!/ I'm happy!
Abiri ni ma fu(fu)!	Hunger is killing me!/ I'm hungry!
Sa(w)a si?	What time is it?
Etu alu oʼbitisi.	7:00 a.m. [To tell time, you mention the number on the opposite side of the clock. Etu iri is 8 o'clock, etu na is 9 o'clock, etc]
Etu mudri drini alu	5:00 p.m.
Mi efi!	Come in!
Ife mani yi!	Give me water!
Kirikiri!	Please!
Ada!	True!
Inzo!	Lies!
Iko ma aza!	Help me!
Ine!	See!
Mi a'bua ozi si?	How much do you sell bananas?
Ajeni si?	How much [is the price]?
A le Obangulu!	I want mashed whiteants!
Ma mu Gili Gili-a ngoni?	How do I get to Gili Gili?
Arojo ngoa?	Where is the drugshop/clinic/hospital?
Mi ru a'di-i?	What is your name?
Ma ru Ayikobua!	I'm called Ayikobua!
Te mi-i?	How about you?
Mi omve ma Letasi!	You call me Letasi!
Awaʼdi fo!	Thanks!
A le mi!	I love you!/ I need you!/ I want you!
Inya ci?	Is there food?
Ma enga Ediofe-a.	I'm from Ediofe.
Ma mu kanisa-a.	I'm going to church.
Mi ma agi!	You are my friend!
Ma mu Ojapi-a ngoni?	How do I get to Ojapi?
Masikiti ngoa?	Where is the mosque?
Mi ma ji Ragemu-a ra?	Can you take me to Ragem?
Iji ma Ringili-a!	Take me to Ringili!
'Ba mucele ozi ngoa?	Where is rice sold?
Aje/ andru/ drusi/ drozi	Yesterday/ today/ tomorrow/ the day after tomorrow
Ila muke!	Sleep well!
A le ra!	I do want! [The word 'ra' after a verb denotes positivity]
A le ku!	I don't want! [The word 'ku' after a verb denotes negativity]

=== Relationships ===
Grandfather (aʼbi, aʼbipi)

Grandmother (dede, edapi, e'di)

Grandson (mvia)

Granddaughter (zia)

Father (ati, ata)

Mother (andri, andre, ayia)

Husband (agupi)

Wife (oku)

Son (agupiamva, mvi)

Daughter (zamva, zi)

Brother (adri)

Sister (amvi)

Uncles (paternal: atapuru [singular], atapuruka [plural]; maternal: adroyi [singular], adropi [plural])

Aunts (paternal: andrapuru [singular], andrapuruka [plural and in some cases maternal]; maternal: awupi [singular], awupika [plural]

Cousin (atapurumva)

Cousin brother(s) (atapuruka anzi); also adri, adripika

Cousin sister(s) (atapuruka ezopi); also amvi, amvupika

NB: Strictly speaking, the word cousin is alien in Lugbara culture. Cousins are brothers and sisters.

Nephews (adro anzi) - maternal nephews

Nieces (adro ezoanzi, ezapi) - maternal nieces

Father-in-law (anya)

Mother-in-law (edra)

Brother-in-law (oti, otuo)

Sister-in-law (onyere)

=== Days of the week ===
1 week (Sabatu alu, sabiti alu, yinga alu, yumula alu)

A day is called Oʼdu in Lugbara.

Sunday (Sabatu, sabiti)

Monday (Oʼdu alu)

Tuesday (Oʼdu iri)

Wednesday (Oʼdu na)

Thursday (Oʼdu su)

Friday (Oʼdu towi)

Saturday (Oʼdu azia, Sabato)

=== Calendar ===
The simplest way to refer to months (Mba in Lugbara) is to use numbers, for example January is Mba Alu, February is Mba Iri, May is Mba Towi and so on. But below is the other seasonal way of mentioning them.

Januari/ Oco ʼdupa sere (January)

Feburili/ Kuluni (February)

Marici/ Zengulu (March)

Apirili/ Ayi - Wet season (April)

Mayi/ Ayi Eti (May)

Juni/ Emveki (June)

Julayi/ Eri (July)

Agosilo/ Iripaku (August)

Sebitemba/ Lokopere (September)

Okitoba/ Abibi (October)

Novemba/ Waa (November)

Desemba/ Anyu fi kuma (December)

=== Common signs ===
Lugbara	English
Agupi	Men
Oku	Women

=== Colours ===
Eka, Ika by Terego (red)

Foro foro (gray)

Foroto (grayish)

Imve (white)

Imve silili, imve whilili, imve sisirili (very pure white)

Imvesi-enisi (black and white)

Ini (black)

Inibiricici, inicici, inikukuru (very dark)

== Food ==
Lugbara	English
Mucele	Rice
Fun(y)o	Groundnut
Gbanda/ Ola	Cassava
Osu	Bean, Kaiko in Terego dialect
Burusu/ Buruso	Guinea pea
Kaka	Maize
Ago	Pumpkin
Anyu	Simsim
Ondu	Sorghum
Maaku	Potato
(M)ayu(ni)	Yam
Onya	Whiteant
Ope	Guinea fowl
Au	Chicken
Eza	Meat
Ti eza	Cow meat
Ndri eza	Goat meat
Eʼbi	Fish
Kawa	Coffee
Majani	Tea
I'di	Porridge
Kpete	Beer
Mbasala	Onion
Nyanya	Tomato
Cikiri/ Osu nyiri	Chick pea

== Lugbara AI ==
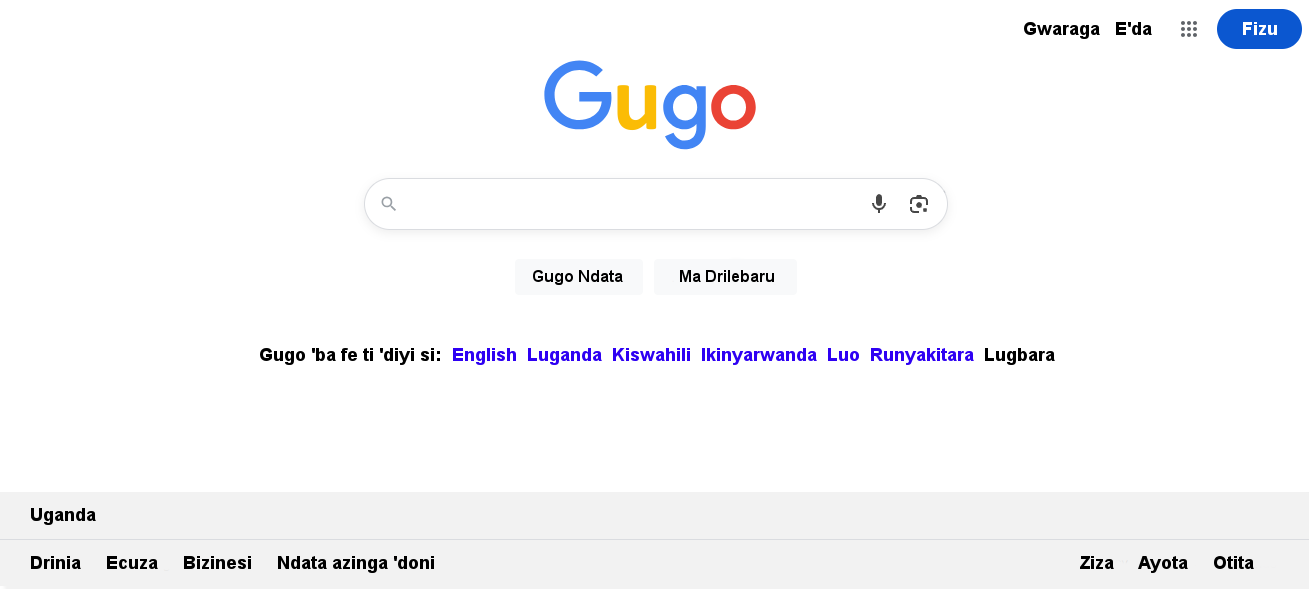
Concept art for Google frontpage in Lugbara

Lugbara AI refers to Artificial Intelligence technology or machines that use Lugbara. The Sunbird Translate system can automatically take text from Lugbara. It includes locally relevant topics such as healthcare, agriculture and society. With its partners including Makerere University AI Lab, Sunbird AI (a Ugandan startup) has built open Lugbara datasets, translation and speech systems. It is also used by banks.

Furthermore, other developers are also working on projects.

== See also ==
- Agofe
- Districts of Uganda
- Lugbara music
- Lugbara proverbs
