= Central Sudanic languages =

Nilo-Saharan language family of Central Africa

Central Sudanic
- Geographic distribution: CAR, Chad, Sudan, South Sudan, Uganda, Congo (DRC)
- Native speakers: ca. 15 million
- Linguistic classification: Nilo-Saharan?: Central Sudanic
- Proto-language: Proto-Central Sudanic
- Subdivisions: Sara–Bongo–Bagirmi; Mangbetu–Asoa; Mangbutu–Lese; Lendu; Moru–Madi; ? Birri–Kresh

Language codes
- ISO 639-5: csu
- Glottolog: cent2225
- Central Sudanic languages in Africa

Central Sudanic is a family of about sixty languages that have been included in the proposed Nilo-Saharan language family. Central Sudanic languages are spoken in the Central African Republic, Chad, Sudan, South Sudan, Uganda, and Congo (DRC). They include the pygmy languages Efé and Asoa.

== Classification ==
Half a dozen groups of Central Sudanic languages are generally accepted as valid. They are customarily divided into East and West branches.

=== Blench (2023) ===
Blench cites the following classification:

- Central Sudanic
  - Eastern (Lendu–Mangbetu)
    - Mangbutu–Lese (5)
    - - Mangbetu–Asua (2–3)
      - - Lendu–Ngiti (2–3)
        - Moru–Madi (10)
  - Birri (1)
  - West (Bongo–Kresh)
    - Sara–Bongo–Bagirmi (40 languages)
    - Kresh (2)
    - ? Sinyar–Formona

Sinyar–Formona is sparsely documented and its placement in the western branch is "provisional".

=== Starostin (2016) ===
Starostin (2016) finds support for Eastern Central Sudanic (Lendu, Mangbetu, Lugbara, etc., concentrated in the northeast corner of DR Congo) but not for the western division, which would include Bongo–Bagirmi and Kresh scattered across Chad, the CAR, and South Sudan.

- Central Sudanic
  - Eastern (Lendu–Mangbetu)
    - Mangbetu (2–3)
    - Mangbutu–Lese (5)
    - Lendu (2–3)
    - Moru–Madi (10)
  - Bongo–Bagirmi (40 languages)
  - Birri–Kresh
    - Birri (1)
    - Kresh (2)

Starostin (2011) notes that the poorly attested language Mimi of Decorse is suggestive of Central Sudanic, though he provisionally treats it as an isolate. Boyeldieu (2010) states that the inclusion of Kresh has yet to be demonstrated, but Starostin (2016) finds good support, with Birri being its closest relative.

=== Bender (1992) ===
Lionel Bender (1992) classifies the Central Sudanic languages as follows, with Central Sudanic bifurcating into a Peripheral branch and a Central branch.

- Central Sudanic
  - Peripheral
    - Moru–Madi
      - Moru (Miza, etc.)
      - Avukaya, Logo, Keliko
      - Madi (Lokai, etc.)
    - Mangbutu: Mamvu; Balese
    - Mangbetu: Meje, Asua, Aka, Lombi
    - Kresh: Kresh; Aja
    - Baadha (a.k.a. Baledha, Lendu)
  - Central
    - Bagirmi-Sara
      - Barma (Bagirmi)
      - Sara-Mbay
      - Sara-Ngambay, Sara Kaba
      - Baka
    - Yulu-Binga
    - Fongoro
    - Shemya (Sinyar)
    - Bongoid
      - Bongo
      - Fer (Kara)
      - Modo, Jur Beli

== Numerals ==
Comparison of numerals in individual languages:

Classification	Language	1	2	3	4	5	6	7	8	9	10
Lendu	Lendu	ɗì / di (by Rev. N.M. Mpanzu)	arɔ / aro	ɡ͡bɔ / ɡbo	θɔ / tho	mbə / mbu	aza / aza	àrʊ̀-ɡ͡bɔ / aruɡbo	àrʊ̀ / aru	ɗrɛ-ði / dredhi	ɗrɛ / dree
Lendu	Ngiti	aɪdí	ɔyɔ	ɪ̀ɓʊ	ɪ̀fɔ	imbo	aza	àrʊ̀ɓʊ̀	àrʊ̀	àrʊ̀ɡyèɪdí	ɪdrɛ
Mangbetu	Mangbetu	kana	sóóndrwé / sóóndrú	sɔ́ta	sɔ́sʉa	tɔ́zɛrɛna / sɔ́zɛrɛna	tɛ́nɡwɛkana / ɛ́tɛana	tónórwe / tónóru	bɔɡɨna	téndeléɡí	tɛ́ɛ́vhɛ́
Mangbutu-Efe	Efe	édí	ɛ̀ɡbɛ̄	tsínà	tsītɔ̀	tsībú	tsínà tsínà (3 + 3)	tsínà tsītɔ̀ (3 + 4)	tsītɔ̀ tsītɔ̀ (4 + 4)	tsītɔ̀ tsībú (4 + 5)	ádíbȍsí
Mangbutu-Efe	Mvuba	eɗì	àkpe	ɛ̀tsɪrà	ɛ̀tsɪrɔ̀	ɛ̀tsɪᵐbú	màⁿzà	làlòɗu	làlɔ̀	àᵐbʊ̀tsɪhʊwa	àᵐʊ̀tsí
Moru-Madi	Moru	àlʊ̄	rì	nā	sū	nd͡ʒī	nd͡ʒī drì àlʊ̄ (5+ 1)	nd͡ʒī drì rì (5+ 2)	nd͡ʒī drì nā (5+ 3)	nd͡ʒī drì sū (5+ 4)	ɓùtè
Moru-Madi, Central	Avokaya	àlō	rì	nā	sū	njī	njī-kázíyá	njī-drì-là-rì (5 + 2)	njī-drì-là-nā (5 + 3)	njī-drì-là-sū (5 + 4)	mūdrí (hands joined)
Moru-Madi, Central	Kaliko (Keliko)	àlō	ìrì	nā	sū	tàu	ázyá	ázîrí	àrò	órōmè	mūdrí (hands joined)
Moru-Madi, Central	Logo	àlo	rì	na	su	nzi	kází	nzi-drì-rì (5 + 2)	nzi-drì-na (5 + 3)	nzi-drì-su (5 + 4)	mudrí (hands joined)
Moru-Madi, Central	Lugbara (Lugbarati)	àlʊ̄	ìrɪ̀	nā	sū	tòwɪ́	ázɪ́á	ázɪ́ìrɪ̀	àrò	óròmɪ̀	mōdrɪ́
Moru-Madi, Central	Omi (Omiti)	àlō	ìrɪ̀	nā	sū	tòwú	ázɪ́á	ázɪ́ɪ̀rɪ̀	àrò	órōmɪ̀	mūdrɪ́
Moru-Madi, Southern	Maʼdi (1)	àlʊ̄	(è)rì	(ī)nā	(ī)sū	tòú	ázɨ́á	tûdērì	àrɔ̀	drítʃàlʊ̄	mūdrí
Moru-Madi, Southern	Maʼdi (2)	àlʊ̄	èrì ~ rì	ìnā ~ nā	ìsū ~ sū	tòú	ázɨ́á	tûdērì	àrɔ̀	drítʃàlʊ̄	mūdrí
Moru-Madi, Southern	Oluʼbo	àlʊ̄	rì	nā	sū	tòú	ázɨ́á	tûdērì	àrɔ̀	tɔ́rɔ̄mɛ̀	mūdúrí
Bongo-Bagirmi, Bongo-Baka, Baka	Baka	ké̘ɗò	ɡ͡bʀ͡ʙɛ̀	ɔ̀tà	ɛ̀sɔ̀	ìɲì	ìɲi dɔ̀à kéɽí (5, on it 1)	ìɲi dɔ̀à ɡ͡bʀ͡ʙɛ̀ (5, on it 2)	ìɲi dɔ̀à ɔ̀tà (5, on it 3)	ìɲi dɔ̀à ɛ̀sɔ̀ (5, on it 4)	sɔ̀kɔ́
Bongo-Bagirmi, Bongo-Baka, Bongo	Bongo	kɔ̀tʊ́	ŋɡɔ̀r	mʊ̀tːà	ʔɛ́w	múì	dɔ̀kɔtʊ́ (5 + 1)	dɔ́ŋɡɔr (5 + 2)	dɔ̀mʊ́tːà (5 + 3)	dɔ̀mʔɛ́w (5 + 4)	kɪ̀ː
Bongo-Bagirmi, Bongo-Baka, Morokodo-Beli	Jur Mödö	kɔ̀tɔ́	rḯyö́	mòtá	sòwɔ́	mùyí̈	mòdɔ́ɔ́kɔ̀tɔ́ (5 + 1)	mòdɔ́mòrḯyö́ (5 + 2)	mòdɔ́ɔ́mòtá (5 + 3)	mòdɔ́mòsòwɔ́ (5 + 4)	ɓùtë́
Bongo-Bagirmi, Kara	Yulu	kȁal(ə̏)	jōoy(ə̄)	mȍotȁ	ȕsȍ	mȕu	mȉtə̏ kȁal(ə̏) {? / one}	mȉtə̏ jōoy(ə̄) {? / two}	mȉtə̏ mȍotȁ {? / three}	mȉtə̏ ȕsȍ ~ mȉȕsȍ {? / four}	kpúu
Bongo-Bagirmi, Sara-Bagirmi, Bagirmi	Bagirmi (Bʼarma)	kɛ́ɗɛ̀	sapi	mtá	só	mí	mìká	tʃílí	marta	doso	dòk kemɛ́
Bongo-Bagirmi, Sara-Bagirmi, Bagirmi	Kenga	kàlāŋ	dìó	mɔ̀tɔ́	sɔ̄ː	mīː	mɛ̀cɛ́	cīlí	mārtá	jɛ́rnàŋ	sīk
Bongo-Bagirmi, Sara-Bagirmi, Bagirmi	Naba (Bilala)	fèné /pènè	rìyó	mɔ̀tɔ́ / mátà	sɔ́	móy	míʃà / máʃà	sī̄lí	rātá	rɔ̄fó	sí
Bongo-Bagirmi, Sara-Bagirmi, Sara, Sara Proper	Bébot	káre	ɟó	mɨ̀té	sɔ́ː	mḭ́ː	mɛ̰hɛ	sɨrí	ɟiɟó (10 -2)	ɟikáre (10 -1)	dɔ̀ɡɨ
Bongo-Bagirmi, Sara-Bagirmi, Sara, Sara Proper	Bedjond	kárē	jōó	mə̀tá	sɔ́	mí	mêhḛ́	sīrí	jī jōó (10 -2)	jī kárē (10 -1)	dɔ̀ɡə̀
Bongo-Bagirmi, Sara-Bagirmi, Sara, Sara Proper	Gulay	kérē	jōó	mùtœ́	sɔ́	mí	mèhé̯	sìrí	sɔ́sɔ́ (4 + 4)	jī kérē (10 - 1)	dɔ̀ɡə̀ / kùtə̀
Bongo-Bagirmi, Sara-Bagirmi, Sara, Sara Proper	Kaba (Kabba) (1)	kaára	jooà	moètaà	sóà	mïù	mïìsaàn	sirïù	jijooà (4 + 4)	jikaàra (10 - 1)	dóèkuè
Bongo-Bagirmi, Sara-Bagirmi, Sara, Sara Proper	Kaba (Kabba) (2)	káɾā	dʒōó	mòtá	sɔ́	mĩ́	mĩ̀sã́n	sīɾí	dʒīdʒōó (4 + 4)	dʒīkáɾā (10 - 1)	dɔ̀kù
Bongo-Bagirmi, Sara-Bagirmi, Sara, Sara Proper	Mango	kárē	jōó	mɨ̀tə́	sɔ́	mí	mèhẽ́	sīrí	jī̄-nàɲ-jōó (10 - 2)	jī̄-nàɲ-kárē (10 - 1)	dɔ̀ɡɨ̀
Bongo-Bagirmi, Sara-Bagirmi, Sara, Sara Proper	Mbay	kə́rā	jōó	mə̀tá	sɔ̄ɔ́	mḭ̄́ḭ	kə́-bɔ̀y-dètə́	tènə̀-mə̀tá (5 + 1)	jī-jōó (10 - 2)	jī-kə́rā (10 - 1)	kə̀lá
Bongo-Bagirmi, Sara-Bagirmi, Sara, Sara Proper	Ngam	kóɡīí	dīyó	mə̀tá	sɔ́	mí	mêhḛ́	sīrí	sɔ́sɔ́ (4 + 4)	ndōhó	kùtə̀
Bongo-Bagirmi, Sara-Bagirmi, Sara, Sara Proper	Ngambay (Sara Ngambai)	kàrā	jōó	mùndá	sɔ́	mí	mìsã́ / màhã́	sīrí	jī̄-này-jōó (10 - 2)	jī̄-này-kárā (10 - 1)	dɔ̀ɡə̀
Bongo-Bagirmi, Sara-Bagirmi, Sara, Sara Proper	Sar (Sara)	kóɡīí	jōó	mə̀tá	sɔ́	mí	mèhé̯	sìrí	sɔ́sɔ́ (4 + 4)	ndōkó	kùtə̀
Bongo-Bagirmi, Sara-Bagirmi, Sara, Sara Proper, Sara Kaba	Kaba Deme	ɗíyá	jó	mùtɔ́	sɔ̀ɔ́	mìí	mìi kàlí (5 + 1)	mìí já jó (5 + 2)	sàlānjā	dɔ̀ kám	dɔ̀ɡɔ̀ / kùtù
Bongo-Bagirmi, Sara-Bagirmi, Sara, Sara Proper, Sara Kaba	Kaba Na	kárē / hàré	jōó	mùtá	sɔ̀ɔ́	mìí	màhá	mìtə́kə́jə́	sàlīnjā	dàhábú	dɔ̀ɡɔ̀
Bongo-Bagirmi, Sara-Bagirmi, Sara, Vale	Lutos	ɗóí	zíò	mútà	só	mí	mí zò ɗóí (5 + 1)	kál m͡bákàɗɛ̀ (8 - 1)	m͡bákàɗɛ́	kál ɓú (10 - 1)	ɓú
Bongo-Bagirmi, Sara-Bagirmi, Sara, Vale	Vale	kīɗá	díyò	mùtá	sɔ́	mí	míkìdí kīɗá (5 + 1)	míkìdí díyò (5 + 1)	ɗɔ̄ɗɔ̄sɔ́ (2 x 4) ??	kàmnànɡà kīɗá (10 - 1)	ɓúfú
Bongo-Bagirmi, Sinyar	Sinyar	kàllà	róò	mùʈʈà	ùssà	mòy	mìccà	mòorsò	màartà	mànɖéy	ʈìyà
Kresh	Kresh (Gbaya)	ɓälã	rǒmó	tötö	sösö	sálã	sálã lẽmbẽ ɓälã (5 + 1)	sálã lẽmbẽ rǒmó (5 + 2)	sálã lẽmbẽ tötö (5 + 3)	sálã lẽmbẽ sösö (5 + 4)	kpú

== See also ==
- List of Proto-Central Sudanic reconstructions (Wiktionary)
- Central Sudanic word lists (Wiktionary)

== Sources ==
- Blench, Roger. 2011. "Can Sino-Tibetan and Austroasiatic help us understand the evolution of Niger-Congo noun classes?", CALL 41, Leiden.
- Blench, Roger. Central Sudanic overview.
- Blench, Roger. 2018. Core and peripheral noun morphology in Central Sudanic languages. Proceedings of the 13th Nilo-Saharan Conference University of Addis Ababa, 6 May 2017
- Starostin, George. On Mimi, Journal of Language Relationship, v. 6, 2011, pp. 115–140.
