= List of ethnic groups in South Sudan =

Map of the ethnic groups of South Sudan

South Sudan is populated by about 64 ethnic groups. The Dinka are the largest ethnic group recorded, followed by the Nuer people as the second largest tribe in South Sudan, the Shilluk follows as the third in number. It is disputed whether Bari is 4th according to their territory which is Juba county. Zande, also known as Azande, are the fifth largest tribe in South Sudan with a total population of 100,000 followed by Balanda with a population of 80,000.

While composed of many ethnic groups, the Fertit in Lol State have formed a unique identity.

Ethnic Group	Size	Region	Language	Language Family
Acholi	30,000-50,000	Equatoria (Imatong State)	Southern Luo (Acholi dialect)	Nilotic
Aja	300	Bahr el Ghazal (Western)	Aja	Central Sudanic
Anuak	100,000	Greater Upper Nile (Boma State)	Anuak	Nilotic
Arabs	348,000		Arabic	Afroasiatic
Atuot	100,000	Bahr el Ghazal (Eastern Lakes State)	Reel	Nilotic
Avukaya	50,000	Equatoria (Maridi State)	Avokaya	Central Sudanic
Bai	6,300	Bahr el Ghazal	Bai	Ubangian
Baka	25,000-30,000	Equatoria (Maridi State)	Baka	Central Sudanic
Balanda Boor	40,000-50,000	Bahr el Ghazal (Wau State), Equatoria (Tambura State)	Belanda Bor	Nilotic
Balanda Bviri		Bahr el Ghazal	Belanda Viri	Ubangian
Banda	22,500	Bahr el Ghazal		Ubangian
Bari	672,000	Equatoria (Jubek State)	Bari	Nilotic
Binga		Bahr el Ghazal (Lol State)	Binga	Central Sudanic
Bongo	19,000	Bahr el Ghazal	Bongo	Central Sudanic
Boya (Larim)	20,000-25,000	Equatoria (Kapoeta State)	Laarim	Surmic
Burun (Maban)	100,000	Greater Upper Nile (Maban County)	Burun	Nilotic
Didinga	150,000	Equatoria (Kapoeta State)	Didinga	Surmic
Dinka	4,500,000	Bahr el Ghazal, Greater Upper Nile	Dinka	Nilotic
Dongotono	120,000	Equatoria (Eastern)	Dongotono	Nilotic
Gbaya/Kerish		Bahr el Ghazal (Western)	Gbaya/Kerish	Ubangian
Gollo		Bahr el Ghazal	Golomo	Ubangian
Ifoto		Equatoria	Lotuko	Nilotic
Imatong	16,000	Equatoria	Lotuko	Nilotic
Indri	600	Bahr el Ghazal (Lol)	Indri	Ubangian
Jiye		Greater Upper Nile (Boma)	Jiye	Nilotic
Jur Beli	100,000	Bahr el Ghazal	Beli	Central Sudanic
Jur Modo	300,000	Western Equatoria	Mödö	Central Sudanic
Jur Mananger	20,000-30,000	Bahr el Ghazal		Nilotic
Kakwa	450,000	Equatoria (Yei River State)	Kakwa	Nilotic
Kaligi (Feroghe)	23,000	Bahr el Ghazal	Kaligi	Ubangian
Kara		Bahr el Ghazal	Tar Gula	Central Sudanic
Keliko	27,000	Equatoria (Yei River State)	Keliko	Central Sudanic
Ketebo	45,000	Eastern Equatoria State	Oketeboi and Lokathan	Nilotic
Kuku	30,000-35,000	Equatoria (Kajo-Keji County)	Kutuk na Kuku	Nilotic
Lango	25,000-30,000	Equatoria (Imatong State)	Lango	Nilotic
Logir	15,000	Equatoria	Lotuko	Nilotic
Lokoya	30,000	Equatoria (Jubek State and Imatong State)	Lokoya	Nilotic
Lopit	25,000-30,000	Equatoria (Imatong State)	Lopit	Nilotic
Lugbara	3,500-5,000	Equatoria (Yei River State)	Lugbara	Central Sudanic
Lotuko (Otuho)	70,000	Equatoria (Imatong State)	Otuho	Nilotic
Lulubo	30,000-40,000	Equatoria (Jubek State and Imatong State)	Olu’bo	Central Sudanic
Luwo (also known as Jur Chol)	60,000-70,000	Bahr el Ghazal	Jur or Luo	Nilotic
Madi	30,000	Equatoria (Imatong State)	Ma'di	Central Sudanic
Makaraka (Adio)		Equatoria		
Mangayat		Bahr el Ghazal (Lol State)	Mangaya	Ubangian
Morokodo	40,000	Equatoria	Morokodo	Central Sudanic
Moru	80,000-100,000	Equatoria (Maridi State)	Moru	Central Sudanic
Mundari	70,000-100,000	Equatoria (Terekeka State)	Mundari	Nilotic
Mundu	50,000-60,000	Equatoria (Maridi State)	Mündü	Ubangian
Murle	300,000-400,000	Greater Upper Nile (Boma State)	Murle	Surmic
Ndogo	40,000	Bahr el Ghazal	Ndogo	Ubangian
Ngulgule	1,900	Bahr el Ghazal	Nyolge	Daju
Nuer	2,000,000	Greater Upper Nile	Nuer	Nilotic
Nyangatom	11,000	Equatoria (Ilemi Triangle)	Nyangatom	Nilotic
Nyangwara	25,000-30,000	Equatoria (Jubek State and Terekeka State)	Bari	Nilotic
Pari	11,000	Equatoria (Imatong State)	Päri	Nilotic
Pojulu	800,000	Equatoria (Jubek State and Yei River State)	Bari	Nilotic
Sere	10,000	Bahr el Ghazal	Sere	Ubangian
Shilluk	1,965,000	Greater Upper Nile (Fashoda State)	Shilluk	Nilotic
Suri (Kichepo)	30,000	Greater Upper Nile (Boma State)	Baale	Surmic
Tennet	30,000-81,000	Equatoria (Imatong State)	Tennet	Surmic
Thuri (Shatt)	70,000	Bahr el Ghazal	Thuri	Nilotic
Toposa	274,000	Equatoria (Kapoeta State)	Toposa	Nilotic
Uduk	9,700	Greater Upper Nile (Northern Upper Nile State)	Uduk	Koman
Yulu	2,500	Bahr el Ghazal	Yulu	Central Sudanic
Zande (Azande)	878,000	Equatoria	Zande	Zande
