= Culture of South Sudan =

The culture of South Sudan encompasses the religions, languages, ethnic groups, foods, and other traditions of peoples of the modern state of South Sudan, as well as of the inhabitants of the historical regions of southern Sudan.

== South Sudan historical sites ==
=== Boma National Park ===
Boma National Park is located in Eastern Equatoria, near the Ethiopian border. While primarily known for its wildlife, Boma National Park is also home to ancient rock art and archaeological sites that provide insights into the early settlements in the region.

=== Khartoum–South Sudan border area ===
Khartoum–South Sudan border area is located in the Upper Nile region. This region has ancient burial mounds and archaeological sites that date back to the pre-colonial era, reflecting the history of the Nilotic peoples.

=== Jebel Barkal ===
Jebel Barkal is located near the northern border with Sudan, in the Upper Nile region.

=== Nimule National Park ===
Nimule National Park is located in Eastern Equatoria, near the Ugandan border. Nimule is a wildlife reserve which also has historical significance due to its proximity to ancient trade routes and early human settlements.

=== Wau Western Bahr el Ghazal state ===
The city of Wau is located in Western Bahr el Ghazal. Wau is one of the oldest towns in South Sudan and has colonial-era architecture, including churches and administrative buildings from the Anglo-Egyptian period.

=== Ancient rock art sites ===
South Sudan is home to numerous ancient rock art sites that depict ancient hunting scenes, animals, and early human life. These sites are evidence of the region's long history of human habitation. They are found particularly in the Kapoeta region of Eastern Equatoria.

== Languages ==
The official language of South Sudan is English.

There are over 60 indigenous languages, most classified under the Nilo-Saharan Language family. Collectively, they represent two of the first order divisions of Nile Sudanic and Central Sudanic.

In the border region between the Western Bahr Al Ghazal state and Sudan are an indeterminate number of people from West African countries who settled here on their way back from Mecca—who have assumed a traditionally nomadic life—that reside either seasonally or permanently. They primarily speak Chadian languages and their traditional territories are in the southern portions of the Sudanese regions of Northern Kordofan and Darfur.

In the capital Juba, several thousand people use dialect forms of Arabic, usually called Juba Arabic. However, South Sudan's ambassador to Kenya stated on 2 August 2011 that Swahili will be introduced to supplant Arabic as a lingua franca. This aligns with the country's intention to orient itself toward the East African Community rather than Sudan and the Arab League.

== Religion ==
While the northern parts of Sudan have been predominantly Muslim, South Sudan is predominantly Christian or follows African traditional animism, while a small number of citizens are Muslims.

== National holidays ==
Public holidays celebrated in South Sudan include Islamic holidays, such as Eid al-Fitr and Eid al-Adha, Christian holidays, such as Christmas and Easter, and secular holidays, such as New Year's Day and May Day. There are also several South Sudanese holidays which are celebrated, which include Peace Agreement Day, SPLA Day, Independence Day, and Martyrs' Day.

== Ethnic groups ==
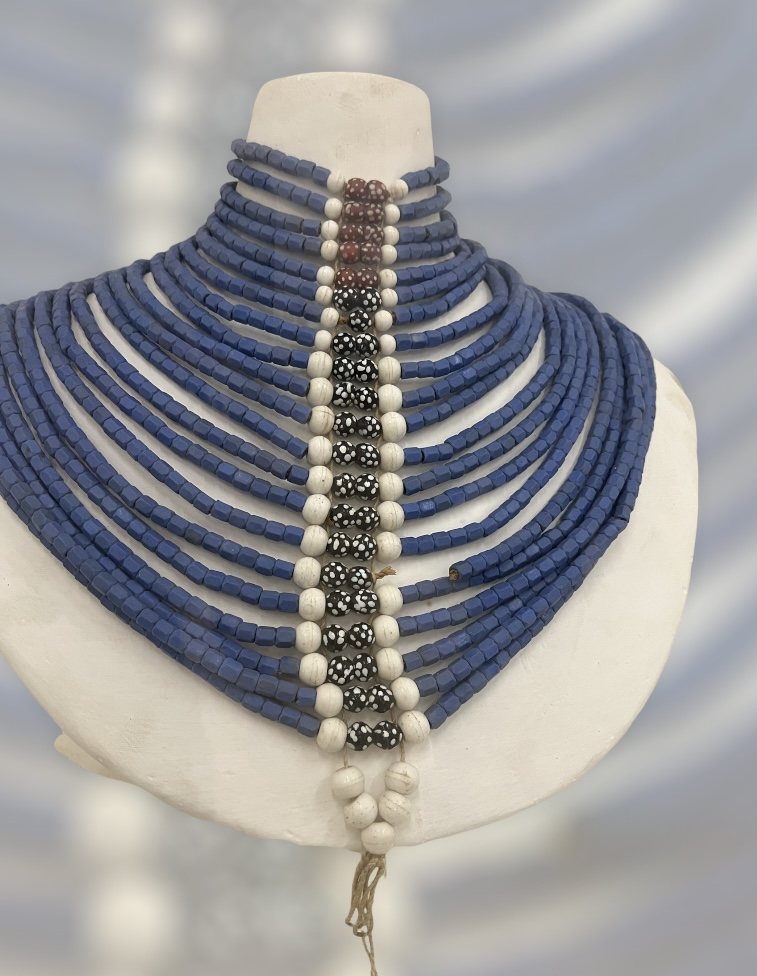
Dinka beaded collar, Sudan Ethnographic Museum 2022.

Ethnic groups in South Sudan include the Nuer, Dinka, Shilluk, Murle, Dongotono, Anuak, Atuot, Burun, Jur Beli, Moru, Pojulu, Otuho, Thuri, Jur Chol or Luwo, Didinga, Avukaya, Mundu, Ketebo, Balanda, Morokodo, Ndogo, Acholi, Lulubo, Lokoya, Kichepo, Baka, Lango, Lopit, Nyangwara, Tennet, Jur Mananger, Kuku, Boya, Lugbara and Sere, among others.

Between 1926 and 1936, the British anthropologist E.E. Evans-Pritchard, the author of several books on culture and lifestyles in southern Sudan, also took thousands of photographs during his anthropological fieldwork. About 2500 of his images, mainly showing the life of the Azande, Moro, Ingessana, Nuer and Bongo peoples are in the collection of the Pitt Rivers Museum, the University of Oxford's museum of anthropology, with many of them published online.

Further, the Pitt Rivers Museum's webpage offers a detailed catalogue of the museum's collections from southern Sudan. These collections comprise more than 1300 artefacts and 5000 photographs. Both the artefacts and photographs serve as a research tool for studying the cultural and visual history of southern Sudan. The site also "provides a map; annotated lists of cultural groups, collectors, photographers, and people portrayed in the photographs; and a set of further resources (relevant literature, websites, and a site bibliography)."

== Society ==
Most South Sudanese keep up the core of their local culture, even while in exile or diaspora. Traditional culture is strongly upheld, with a significant focus placed on knowing one's ethnic origins and language. Although the common languages spoken are Juba Arabic and English, there are plans to introduce Kiswahili to the population to improve the country's relations with its East African neighbors. For disambiguation similar to how the Democratic Republic of the Congo and the Republic of the Congo are distinguished as "Congo-Kinshasa" and "Congo-Brazzaville", the names of Sudan and South Sudan are sometimes differentiated by their capitals as "Sudan-Khartoum" and "Sudan-Juba".

== Music ==
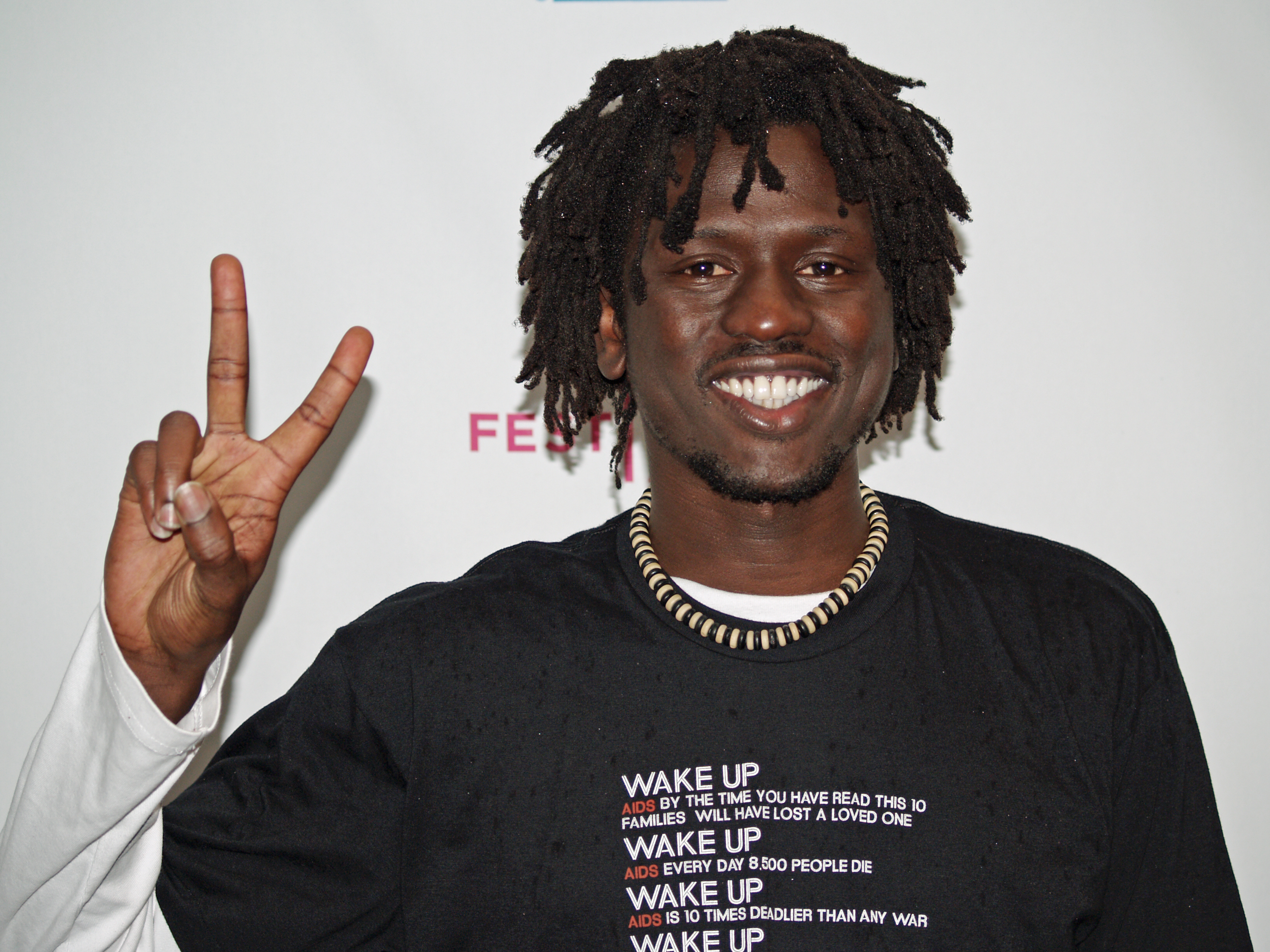
Emmanuel Jal at the Tribeca Film Festival in New York 2008.

South Sudan has a rich tradition of folk music that reflects its diverse indigenous cultures. For example, the folk music of the Dinka people includes highly appreciated poetry, while the Azande are especially known for their storytelling. The drummers of the record Wayo combine spiritual chanting with interlocking grooves. The music, centered around the kpaningbo, a large wooden xylophone played by three people, is completed by the rest of the village, who rotate through a series of bells and percussive instruments.

Due to its geographic location and many years of civil war, the musical culture is heavily influenced by neighboring countries. Many South Sudanese fled to Ethiopia, Kenya and Uganda, where they interacted with the nationals and learned their languages and culture. Many of those who remained in the country, while it was still part of Sudan, or went North to live in Sudan or Egypt, assimilated the Arabic culture and language of their neighbors.

Many music artists from South Sudan use English, Kiswahili, Juba Arabic, their local language, or a mix of languages. During the 1970s and 1980s, Juba was home to a thriving nightlife. Top local bands included the Skylarks and Rejaf Jazz. Popular artist Emmanuel Kembe sings folk, reggae, and Afrobeat. Yaba Angelosi, who emigrated to the United States in 2000, sings Afrobeat, R&B and Zouk. Dynamiq is popular for his reggae releases, while Lil Meek DC and Emmanuel Jal are hip hop artist of international fame.

== Literature ==
Apart from the traditional oral literature of its various ethnic groups, South Sudan has modern literary writers. These include short story writer Stella Gaitano, who has written in Arabic since her days as a student at the University of Khartoum.

Taban Lo Liyong, who was born in southern Sudan in 1939 and studied in the United States during the 1960s, is one of Africa's well-known poets and writers of fiction and literary criticism.

Alephonsion Deng and his brother Benson Deng became known as refugees who fled war and starvation to neighboring Kenya before emigrating to the United States. There, they co-wrote their account as the Lost Boys of Sudan.

== Sport ==
- South Sudan Football Association
- South Sudan national football team
- South Sudan men's national basketball team

== See also ==
- Cinema of South Sudan
- Ministry of Youth and Sports (South Sudan)
- National Archives of South Sudan
