= Kaligi =

Kaligi may refer to:

- Kaligi people, an ethnic group of South Sudan
- Kaligi language, their language

== See also ==
- Căligi, a village in Romania
- Khaligi (disambiguation)
