= List of counties of Western Bahr el Ghazal =

Counties of Western Bahr el Ghazal
- Location: Western Bahr el Ghazal
- Number: 3 Counties
- Populations: (Counties):151,320 (Wau County) – 127,771 (Jur River County) - 54,340 (Raga County)
- Areas: (Counties):46 square miles (120 km^{2}) (Raga County) – 27 square miles (70 km^{2}) (Wau County) 22 square miles (57 km^{2}) (Jur River County)
- Government: County government
- Subdivisions: counties

There are three counties in Western Bahr el Ghazal, a state of South Sudan. Each county is named after their seats, and the three counties are Raga County, Wau County, and Jur River County. Each of these counties are governed by county commissioners. In South Sudan, county seats are called the headquarters of the county.

== Counties ==
=== Wau County ===
Wau County is the most populous county in the state with over 151,000 people, and is the second largest and second smallest county in area. Wau, Wau's county seat, is the capital of Western Bahr el Ghazal, and is the second most populous city in South Sudan, behind Juba, the capital, which comes in number 1. Wau County lies in the center of Western Bahr el Ghazal.

=== Jur River County ===
Jur River County is second most and second least populous county, and is the smallest county in terms by area, and borders the Jur River, which it is named for. Jut River county is the only county in the state not to be named after its county seat.

=== Raga County ===
Raga County is a rather large county, as it is the largest county in South Sudan, however the least populous county in Western Bahr el Ghazal.

== Kafia Kingi ==
Kafia Kingi is a disputed territory at the border of Raga County, Central African Republic and Sudan. The territory has been disputed by Sudan and South Sudan since the latter's independence, as with Abyei. Sudan forces from the north have and continue to control most of the region.
