= Kuajina Payam =

Payam of Jur River County, Western Bahr el Ghazal

Kuajina Payam is a payam (district) of Jur River County in South Sudan state of Western Bahr el Ghazal. is located southeast of the Western Bahr el Ghazal state. The Bomas of Kuajina Payam includes Kuajina, Mbili, Mapel, and Dankachak Boma. The local population is Luwo ethnicity.

The Payam hosts the historical Roman Catholic Mbili Mission in Mbili village, 5 miles west of the main road from Kuajina to Wau. The mission established in 1903 is recognized as the first Catholic church in South Sudan, during the Anglo-Egyptian administration from 1898 to 1956.
