= Ndogo =

Ndogo may refer to:

- Ndogo people
- Ndogo language
