= Mapel Airstrip =

- IATA: n/a; ICAO: n/a

Summary
- Airport type: Public, Civilian
- Serves: Mapel, South Sudan
- Location: Mapel, South Sudan
- Coordinates: 07°17′39″N 28°26′44″E

Map
- Location of Mapel Airstrip in South Sudan

Runways
Direction	Length		Surface
Direction	ft	m	Surface
15/33	3,400	1,040	Unpaved

Mapel Airstrip is an airport in South Sudan.

== Location ==
Mapel Airstrip is located in Jur River County, Western Bahr el Ghazal State, near the town of Mapel.

This location lies approximately 440 kilometres (270 mi), by air, northwest of Juba International Airport, the largest airport in South Sudan. The elevation of Mapel Airstrip is unknown. It has a single, unpaved runway.

== Overview ==
Mapel Airstrip is a small civilian airport that serves the towns of Mapel and Medil. There are no known scheduled airlines serving this airport at this time, but the United Nations Humanitarian Air Service served the field from Rumbek Airport.

== See also ==
- Western Bahr el Ghazal
- Bahr el Ghazal
- List of airports in South Sudan
