= Mangaya language =

Ubangian language of South Sudan

Mangaya
- Mangayat, Buga
- Native to: South Sudan
- Ethnicity: Mangaya (Bug)
- Native speakers: (400 cited 1987)
- Language family: Ubangian: Seri–Mba; Sere; Feroge–Mangaya; Mangaya

Language codes
- ISO 639-3: myj
- Glottolog: mang1387
- ELP: Mangayat

Mangaya (Buga) is a Ubangian language of South Sudan. The endonym is Bug.

As of 2013, they reside in Sopo Payam, Raja County. Ethnic Buja (Buga) live in Sopo Boma, while ethnic Banda live in Mangayat Boma of Sopo Payam.
