= Louis Rizick Dominic =

South Sudanese politician

Louis Rizick Dominic is a South Sudanese politician. He has served as County Commissioner of Raga County, Western Bahr el Ghazal since 18 May 2010.
