= Languages of South Sudan =

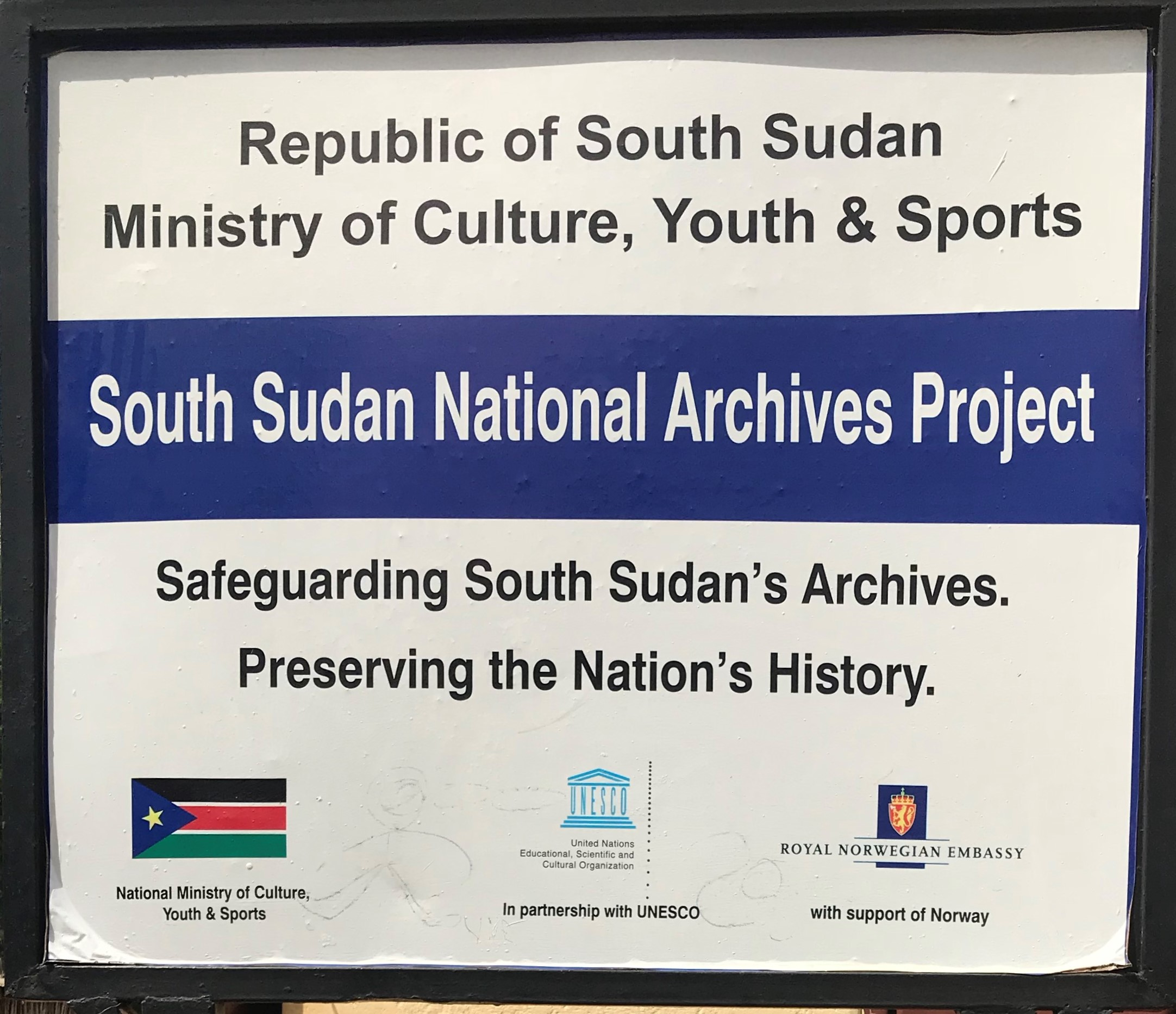
- English sign in Juba
- Official: English
- National: Bari; Dinka; Luo; Murle; Nuer; Zande; and around 6 other languages (Note: The Transitional Constitution of the Republic of South Sudan, Part One, 6(1): "All indigenous languages of South Sudan are national languages and shall be respected, developed and promoted".)
- Foreign: Arabic, French, Swahili
- Signed: South Sudanese Sign Language
- Keyboard layout: QWERTY
- Lingua francas: Juba Arabic; English; Bari; Dinka; Luo; Murle; Nuer; Zande

South Sudan is a multilingual country, with over 60 indigenous languages spoken. The official language of the country is English which was introduced in the region during the colonial era (see Anglo-Egyptian Sudan).

Some of the indigenous languages with the most speakers include Dinka, Nuer, Shilluk, Bari, and Zande.

Both English and Juba Arabic, an Arabic pidgin used by over a million people especially in the capital city of Juba, serve as lingua francas.

== Official language ==
Prior to independence the 2005 interim constitution of the Southern Sudan Autonomous Region declared in Part 1, Chapter 1, No. 6 (2) that "English and Arabic shall be the official working languages at the level of the governments of Southern Sudan and the States as well as languages of instruction for higher education".

The government of the new independent state later removed Arabic as an official language and chose English as the sole official language. Part One, 6(2) of the transitional constitution of the Republic of South Sudan of 2011 states that "English shall be the official working language in the Republic of South Sudan".

Laura Kasinof of Foreign Policy wrote that English was chosen to distance South Sudan from Sudan. South Sudan has expressed interest in adopting Swahili as a second official language in order to deepen ties with the East African Community.

== Indigenous languages ==
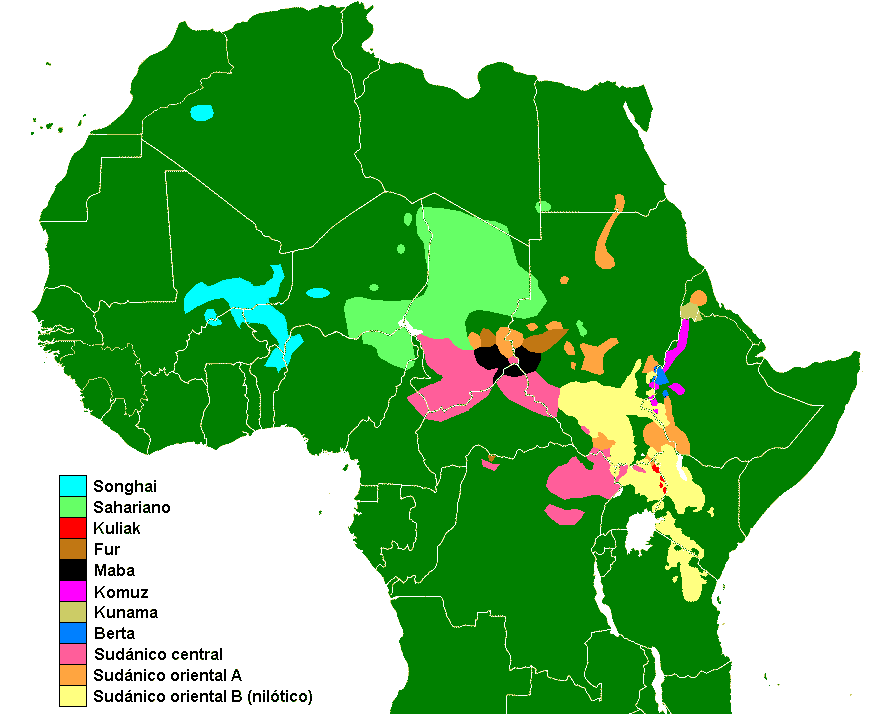
African map of the Nilo-Saharan languages. The Eastern and Central Sudanic branches dominate in South Sudan.

There are over 60 indigenous languages spoken in South Sudan. Most of the indigenous languages are classified under the Nilo-Saharan language family; collectively, they represent two of the first order divisions of Nilo-Saharan (Eastern Sudanic and Central Sudanic). The remainder belong to the Ubangi languages of the Niger–Congo language family, and they are spoken in the southwest.

The most recent available population statistics for many South Sudan indigenous languages go back to the 1980s. Since then, the war of independence led to many civilian deaths and massive displacement of refugees to Sudan and beyond. Due to the drafting of colonial borders in Africa by European powers during the 19th and 20th centuries, some indigenous languages of South Sudan are spoken in neighbouring countries, in some cases more so than in South Sudan. Azande, for example is estimated to have twice as many speakers in the neighbouring Democratic Republic of the Congo, while the Banda group of languages may have more speakers in the Central African Republic than in South Sudan.

The languages with the most speakers in South Sudan are Dinka with 4.5 million speakers, Nuer with 1.8 million speakers, Shilluk with 920,000 speakers, Bari with 420,000 speakers, and Zande with 350,000 speakers. Of the Ubangi languages, available figures indicate that Azande is the only one with a substantial number of speakers in South Sudan.

The interim constitution of 2005 declared in Part 1, Chapter 1, No. 6 (1) that: "All indigenous languages of Southern Sudan are national languages and shall be respected, developed and promoted.

The new transitional constitution of the Republic of South Sudan of 2011 declares in Part 1, Chapter 1, No. 6 (1) that: "All indigenous languages of South Sudan are national languages and shall be respected, developed and promoted." In Part 1, Chapter 1, No. 6 (2) it is defined that: "English shall be the official working language in the Republic of South Sudan, as well as the language of instruction at all levels of education."

== Indigenous language loss ==
Since 1950, three South Sudanese indigenous languages have become extinct, no longer having even ceremonial use—Togoyo, Mittu, and Homa. Of the 68 living languages recognised by ethnologue, 17 are categorised as "in danger." Boguru is used only ceremonially. Aja and Mangayat have only elderly speakers who rarely have the opportunity to use the languages.

West Central Banda, Indri, and Njalgulgule are used commonly among the elderly, but no members of the child-bearing generation speak them actively. An additional 9 languages are not being transferred to children, and although Bongo and Lokoya are spoken by all generations within their population, they are rapidly losing users.

== Non-indigenous languages ==
During the Rejaf Conference held in April 1928 during the Anglo-Egyptian condominium it was decided that schooling in the South would be in the English language. Although after independence the Sudanese government tried to replace English with Arabic, part of the peace agreement in 1972 ensured that English continued as the medium of education in most schools in southern Sudan. English is widely spoken by those who have had the opportunity of going to school, either within South Sudan or in the diaspora.

South Sudan's ambassador to Kenya said on 2 August 2011 that Swahili will be introduced in South Sudan with the goal of supplanting Arabic as a lingua franca, in keeping with the country's intention of orientation toward the East African Community rather than Sudan and the Arab League. Nevertheless, South Sudan submitted an application to join the Arab League as a member state on 25 March 2014, which is still pending. In an interview with the newspaper Asharq Al-Awsat, the Foreign Minister of South Sudan Deng Alor Kuol said: "South Sudan is the closest African country to the Arab world, and we speak a special kind of Arabic known as Juba Arabic". Sudan supports South Sudan's request to join the Arab League.

A group of South Sudanese refugees who were raised in Cuba during the Sudanese wars, numbering about 600, also speak fluent Spanish. They have been named the Cubanos, and most had settled in Juba by the time of the country's independence.

In the state of Western Bahr el Ghazal, in its border region with the neighbouring country of Sudan, there is an indeterminate number of Baggara Arabs (traditionally nomadic people) that resides either seasonally or permanently. Their language is Sudanese Arabic and their traditional territories are in the southern portions of the Sudanese regions of Kurdufan and Darfur. In the capital, Juba, there are several thousand people who use an Arabic pidgin, Juba Arabic. Since South Sudan was part of Sudan for a century, some South Sudanese are conversant in either Sudanese Arabic or Modern Standard Arabic. Juba Arabic is a lingua franca in South Sudan.
