= Al-Shorouk Magazine =

- Format: Weekly
- Publisher: Dar Al Khaleej
- President: Taryam Omran Taryam
- Editor-in-chief: Khaled Taryam
- Founded: 1970
- Language: Arabic
- Headquarters: UAE

Al-Shorouk Magazine is a weekly political magazine published by Dar Al Khaleej for Press, Printing and Publishing. The concern of the magazine is politics, economics, sports, and other affairs. It is issued in Arabic. Every issue has 80 pages.

== Origin and development ==
Al-Shorouk magazine was first issued in July 1970. In the beginning, it was published monthly. Its goal was to spread national and unity awareness, resist colonialism, and respond to the claims of the Shah of Iran regarding Iran's claim of ownership of the three Emirati islands: Abu Musa, Greater and Lesser Tunbs Islands. Al-Shorouk magazine was issued along with its sister newspaper Al-Khaleej. The founders, Trim Imran Trim and Abdullah Imran Trim, attempted to spread the truth to the citizens. They considered it the most basic right of citizenship. Another reason behind creating Al-Shorouk magazine was the awareness of the enormous political transformations in the Persian Gulf region at the end of the sixties and the beginning of the seventies of the twentieth century. The editor of Al-Shorouk magazine is Khaled Abdullah Imran Taryam. Trim Imran Trim and Abdullah Imran Trim, the founders, are also former editors-in-chief.

There is a prevailing national and Arab identity in Al-Shorouk magazine's journalistic position. In the first edition, there is a clear focus on Arab affairs and comment on regional events. Abdullah Imran Trim's article, "Yes to Bahrain Arabism," illustrates this commitment, as does his article under the title "I Tell You," which pays tribute to the soul of martyr Mazen Abu Ghazaleh.

In the second edition, Trim examined the UAE Federation, publishing an article entitled "A Point of View." This article was an early piece demonstrating his new political and journalistic career, in which he emphasized unity, stating, "In the Union, our strength and our ability to build together and effectively participate in the Arab and international family." And then in May 1971, months before the UAE Union was formally established, Trim published a seminal article which promoted what he termed the "Equal Gulf Club." He wrote, "Despite everything, we believe that the great unity is the destiny, and it must happen not just at the Gulf level, but for the larger Arab nation that has been torn apart. Therefore, it is only logical that we work towards another union that fits the new circumstances. The Seventh Union, in this context, seems to be an essential step that cannot be delayed.

== Stop and Re-issue ==
Al-Shorouk had issues at a very early stage. The magazine closed down in February 1970 due to the high cost of publishing it and Al-Khaleej newspaper together. They used to be printed in Kuwait and transported by plane to the Emirate of Sharjah. With Trim Omran's and his brother's intense devotion to editorial independence and freedom from external financial funding, they faced increased political pressure. Both publications were forced out of business after only a year of declaring a united Gulf vision.

Al-Shorouk magazine came back on the 9th of April 1992, after 22 years of not being published.
