= Khaleeji =

Khaleeji (Arabic: خليجي), may refer to:

- The native Arabs from the Arab states of the Persian Gulf, especially those from the Gulf Cooperation Council states
- Culture of Eastern Arabia, associated with Arab states of the Persian Gulf
- Gulf Arabic, a dialect of the Arabic language spoken in Eastern Arabia's coast of the Persian Gulf
- Khaliji (music), a type of music from Eastern Arabia (Arab states of the Persian Gulf)
- Khaleeji (currency), an idea for a common currency for the Gulf Cooperation Council (GCC) member states
- Khaleegy (dance), a traditional dance from the Persian Gulf countries
- Kaligi people, an ethnic group in South Sudan
- Kaligi language, a Ubangian (Niger–Congo) language of South Sudan
- Khaliji, Iran, a village in Kerman Province, Iran

== See also ==
- Khaleej (disambiguation)
