= Feroge =

Feroge or Feroghe may refer to:

- Feroge people, an ethnic group of South Sudan
- Feroge language, their language
