= Luwo people =

Nilotic ethnic group of South Sudan

Luo
Total population
- 193,000

Regions with significant populations
- South Sudan: 193,000

Languages
- Luo language

Religion
- Christianity, African Traditional Religion

Related ethnic groups
- Nilotic peoples, esp. Luo peoples

The Luo are a Nilotic ethnic group that live in Western Bhar Gazal, South Sudan. They are part of a larger group of ethno-linguistically related Luo people of East Africa. They speak the Luo language

They are related to the Luo of Kenya, Uganda and Tanzania. The date of divergence is estimated to have been about eight centuries ago. Their closest relatives are the Anyuak, and Shilluk.There is no tribe called Jurchol in South Sudan. 'Jur' is a reference the Dinka use to refer to someone whose language they don't understand. The Luo of South Sudan are some of the most peaceful people of the land. They believe in a united South Sudan.

== Name ==
The Luwo are known to the Dinka as Jur Chol which is an exonym taken from the Dinka language (compare Jur Beli). Some Luo politicians object to the name.

== Culture ==
The Luo reside in their lands Piluwo or Luwo Land in the Jur River and Wau counties of Western Bahr el Ghazal State and in Aweil Center County of Northern Bahr el Ghazal State. The Luo are also sedentary, meaning they have a centralized living area. They grow sorghum, cassava, sweet potatoes, and beans. They can fish, hunt, and beekeep, making them a well-rounded society.

== Population ==
The Luwo are one of the smaller tribes of South Sudan with population about 171,000. By some accounts, the Luo are the eighth largest ethnic group in South Sudan. They may be found in Aweil, Wau and Tonj states or in Tonj and Western Bahr el Ghazal and Northern Bahr el Ghazal states by the pre-2015 organisation.

A census conducted in 1983 put their population at 80,000.

== Notable people ==
- Joseph Ukel Abango, former Minister of General Education in South Sudan. Veterans South Sudanese politician.
- Peter Lau Madhieu, pioneer of Mapel and major contributor to the SPLM/A
- James Ajongo Mawut, Army Chief of Staff in the Sudan People's Liberation Army
- Elias Waya Nyipuoc, first Governor of Wau State
- Mark Nyipuoch, former Governor of Western Bahr el Ghazal and Current Deputy Speaker of South Sudan's National Legislative Assembly
- Mary Jarvis Yak, Deputy Minister of Finance in South Sudan
- Archbishop Erneu Dut Wien, First South Sudanese Roman Catholic Bishop and Archbishop.
- Jarvis Yak, First South Sudanese Khartoum governor in 1960s.
- Joseph Garang, First South Sudanese to Graduate from Faculty of Law
- Mathiang Muo
- Pione Sisto
