= Khaleej =

Al-Khaleej (Arabic: الخليج) is an Arabic word which means "gulf".

Khaleej may refer to:

- In Gulf Arabic, it primarily refers to the Persian Gulf, on the coast of which the Gulf Arabic dialects are spoken.
- Haliç, the Turkish name of the Golden Horn in Istanbul

== Media ==
- Akhbar Al Khaleej, Bahrain newspaper
- Dar Al Khaleej, UAE publishing company based in Sharjah, UAE
  - Al Khaleej (newspaper), newspaper brand published by Dar Al Khaleej
- Khaleej (TV series), a 1986 Pakistani television drama series
- Khaleej Times, English newspaper brand based in Dubai, UAE
- D 92 road (United Arab Emirates), also known as Al Khaleej Road

== Sports ==
- Khaleej FC, Saudi Arabia football club
- Al Khaleej Club, a UAE football club
- Khaleej Sirte, Libyan football club

== See also ==
- Khaleeji (disambiguation)
