= Acongeong =

- Town
- Location in South Sudan
- Coordinates: 7°55′N 28°10′E
- Country: South Sudan
- Region: Bahr el Ghazal
- State: Western Bahr el Ghazal
- County: Jur River County
- Time zone: UTC+2 (CAT)

Acongeong or Acumcum is a town in the Jur River County of Western Bahr el Ghazal state in the Bahr el Ghazal region of South Sudan. It is located northeast of the city of Wau.

During the Second Sudanese Civil War, UNICEF had a camp in Acumcum to treat malnourished children. Other organizations such as MSF and the World Food Programme of the United Nations were present in Acumcum.
