= Sarah Cleto Hassan =

South Sudanese politician (born 1967)

Governor of Western Bahr el Ghazal
- In office 30 June 2020 – 8 November 2024
- President: Salva Kiir
- Vice President: Riek Machar
- Succeeded by: Emmanuel Okello

Personal details
- Born: 10 November 1967 (age 58) Abu Shaka, Bahr el Ghazal, Republic of the Sudan (now Western Bahr el Ghazal, South Sudan)
- Citizenship: Sudan (until 2011); South Sudan (2011-present)
- Children: 3

Sarah Cleto Hassan Rial (born 10 November 1967) is a South Sudanese politician and human rights activist who was the governor of Western Bahr el Ghazal from 2020 until 2024. She was the only woman among the eight governors appointed by President Salva Kiir on June 30, 2020.

In November 2024, she was replaced as governor by president Kiir, who made her a member of the Council of States. She was succeeded as governor by Emmanuel Okello.

== Early life and education ==
Hassan was born on 10 November 1967 in the village of Abu Shaka, Bahr el Ghazal. She hails from the Golo people of Western Bahr el Ghazal.

She attended the College of Social and Economic Studies, at the University of Juba, previously in Khartoum Sudan and graduated with a B.S. in Statistics and Demography, in 1991 and an M.A. in Political Science/Professional Development from The American University in Cairo in 1996. She obtained a M.A. in the Program for Women in Politics and Public Policy, at the University of Massachusetts Boston in 2006 and a graduate with Certificate of Peace and Conflict Resolution from the Rotary Peace Centre, Chulalongkorn University, Bangkok, Thailand in 2014.

== Personal life ==
Hassan has three sons: Boulo (eldest), Cleto, and Christopher (youngest).
