= Roc-Roc Dong =

Roc-Roc Dong is an administrative unit (payam) within the Jur River County, located in Western Bahr el Ghazal , South Sudan. The administrative headquarters of the payam are situated in Roc-Roc Dong Village, approximately 26 kilometers east of Wau Town, the state capital and principal urban center of the region. The Payam is predominantly inhabited by the Luo community.

Recent news from the last 10 years indicates that Roc Roc Dong in Western Bahr El Ghazal's Jur River County has been a focal point for security operations and community interventions regarding illegal checkpoints, cattle-related conflicts, and local administration. For instance, on February 1, 2017, at least 22 people were reportedly killed in South Sudan’s Jur River County in the aftermath of a conflict between cattle keepers from Warrap state and communities from Wath-Alelo. On November 2, 2017, Governor of then Wau State Angelo Taban fired eight commissioners of which one was Peter Dwai Uyu of Roc-Roc Dong. On May 9, 2024, A SPLA-IO Brigadier general Marko Chol Akue was killed in Roc-Roc Dong after an apparent shoot-out over a land dispute
