= Indri (disambiguation) =

Indri may refer to:

- Archeoindris, an extinct genus of large lemur
- Indri, a lemur of Madagascar
- Indri people
- Indri, India, a city in the Karnal district in the Indian state of Haryana
- Indri (whisky), an Indian brand of whisky
- Indri Search Engine in Lemur Project
- A singular sense organs or faculty, collectively known as Indriya
