= Refugees of South Sudan =

South Sudanese refugees
Total population
- 2,480,744 (July 2026)

Regions with significant populations
- Uganda: 1,043,375
- Sudan: 682,156
- Ethiopia: 483,936
- Kenya: 210,548
- DRC: 57,150

Languages
- Indigenous languages (Dinka, Nuer, Bari, Zande, various others); English, Juba Arabic

Religion
- Christianity, traditional faiths, Islam

South Sudanese refugees are persons originating from the African country of South Sudan, but seeking refuge outside the borders of their native country.

South Sudan became an independent state in 2011, with a population of over 10 million at the time. It has since experienced a civil war from 2013 to 2020, as well as ecosystem mismanagement such as overlogging, which has led to desertification. These conditions have resulted not only in violence and famine, but also in the forced migration of large numbers of the population, both inside and outside the country's borders. In 2016, South Sudan was cited as the largest refugee crisis in Africa south of the Sahara, and the world's third largest. As of 2022, the UNHCR estimated that there were 2.4 million refugees under its mandate originating from South Sudan, making the country the fifth largest source of refugees.

In March 2024, the UNHCR and its partners called for $1.4 billion in aid to support more than two million South Sudanese refugees across five African nations, highlighting the ongoing humanitarian needs of these displaced populations.

== Internally displaced South Sudanese ==
At least 2 million people in South Sudan became internally displaced persons as a result of the South Sudanese Civil War, which lasted from 2013 to 2020.

== Host countries ==
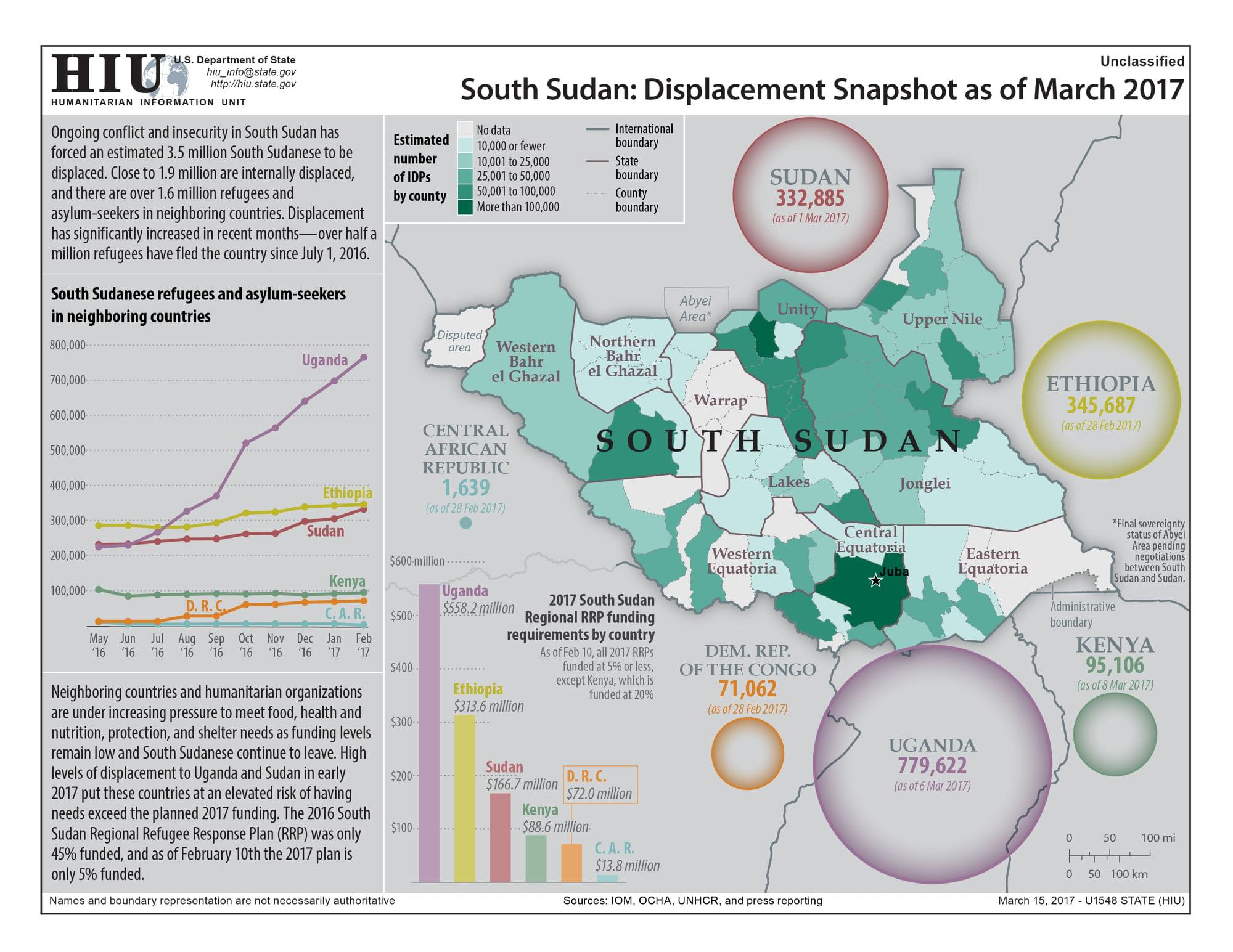
Map showing the displacement of South Sudanese civilians due to the civil war as of March 2017

As of July 2026, an estimated 2,480,744 South Sudanese people were refugees in neighboring countries.

=== Uganda ===
Uganda hosts one of the world’s largest refugee populations and is known for a model based on open borders, land allocation, and access to work and public services. Before South Sudan became an independent state in 2011, Uganda hosted refugees from the area, many of whom returned home after independence. However, following the outbreak of civil war in South Sudan in December 2013, refugee flows resumed, and by 1 January 2014 approximately 7,580 South Sudanese had again entered Uganda, with roughly 1,000 people continuing to arrive each day. Many South Sudanese refugees arriving in Uganda were taken to the Dzaipi transit camp near the border, which, although designed for 3,000 people, became overcrowded with more than 25,000, mostly women and children, lacking adequate shelter and basic services. South Sudanese refugees belonged primarily to two ethnic groups, the Nuer and the Dinka, between whom tensions emerged within the camps.

In January 2016, Uganda experienced a sharp surge in arrivals from South Sudan, with more than twice the expected number of refugees entering the country amid worsening political, social, and economic conditions linked to the prolonged war. Refugees cited drought, hunger, and soaring living costs following currency devaluation as key factors, prompting many internally displaced people to seek asylum in Uganda. Transit centres were stretched to their limits. Most refugees were located at Adjumani, Arua, Kiryandongo and Kampala. From mid-2016 to mid-2017, on average, more than 1,800 South Sudanese refugees fled to Uganda each day. By August 2017, there were more than one million registered South Sudanese refugees in Uganda.

The Bidi Bidi Refugee Settlement in Northwestern Uganda became the largest refugee camp in the world in early 2017, with around 280,000 Southern Sudanese refugees. The Baratuku refugee settlement, established in 1991, hosted successive waves of South Sudanese refugees since the Second Sudanese War. It continues to operate with, as of 2018, significant challenges in supplies and infrastructure. Refugees at the Kiryandongo settlement camp have taken up agriculture.

=== Sudan ===
According to Norwegian Refugees Council (NRC) in Sudan, about 5,000 South Sudanese refugees are settled in semi-settlements around Khartoum; most of which lived in South Sudanese states neighbouring Sudan.

=== Ethiopia ===
About 272,000 refugees from South Sudan were living in the Gambela Region of Ethiopia, as of April 2016. Most of them live in these refugee camps:

- Pugnido camp: ~62,801
- Tierkidi camp: ~54,750
- Kule camp: ~49,410
- Leitchuor camp: ~4,480

Blue Nile students at high schools in Bambasi, Tango, Sherkole, and Ashura refugee camps in Ethiopia report difficulties sitting for the Ethiopian National Examinations. As of 2014, around 5,500 refugees from South Sudan were living at Tirgol, Ethiopia.

=== Kenya ===
In Kenya, 44,000 South Sudanese refugees arrived between late 2013–2015. As a result, Kenya's Kakuma refugee camp expanded by almost half.

== Hosting refugees ==
There are 272,261 registered refugees in South Sudan in 2016: 251,216 are from Sudan, 14,767 are from the DRC, 4,400 from Ethiopia and 1,878 are from the CAR.

== See also ==
- Refugees of Sudan
- South Sudanese diaspora
