= Uguak =

Uguak is a surname. Notable people with the surname include:

- Aher Uguak (born 1998), Canadian basketball player
- Efisio Kon Uguak, South Sudanese politician
