= Gamba language =

Gamba may be:

- Ngambay language of Chad
- Belanda Viri language of South Sudan
