= South Sudanese diaspora =

People of South Sudanese descent living outside South Sudan

Regions with significant populations
- United States: More than 100,000 (2007 estimate)
- Australia: 14,273 (2021 census) – 24,000 (Refugee Council estimate)
- Canada: 5,995 (2021 census)
- United Kingdom: 1,237 (2021 census)

Languages
- Indigenous languages (Dinka, Nuer, Bari, Zande, various others); English, Juba Arabic

Religion
- Christianity, traditional faiths, Islam

Related ethnic groups
- African diaspora

The South Sudanese diaspora consists of citizens of South Sudan and descendants of South Sudanese origin residing outside their homeland.

== History ==
The number of South Sudanese outside South Sudan has sharply increased since the beginning of the struggle for independence from Sudan. Around half a million South Sudanese have left the country as refugees, either permanently or as temporary workforce, leading to the establishment of the South Sudanese diaspora population.

As of 2025, the UNHCR estimated that there were 2.3 million refugees under its mandate originating from South Sudan, making the country the fifth largest source of refugees.

== Locations ==
The largest communities of the South Sudanese diaspora are located in North America, Western Europe, and Oceania are in United States, Canada, United Kingdom, Australia, and small communities exist in Spain, Italy, Germany, Sweden, and New Zealand.

Activist Achol Jok Mach has spoken out about her experience growing up in the diaspora in Cuba and Canada and how it affected her identity, she said: "I was only ever told, "You are South Sudanese"... It was only much later that I learned I was Dinka."

== Diaspora voting ==
Southerners living in Darfur were given the opportunity to vote in the referendum from special polling stations as some tribes advocated unity and others supported separation with a possible ominous precedence for Darfur itself. Polling stations were also set up in eight countries with large South Sudanese populations, namely Australia, Canada, Egypt, Ethiopia, Kenya, Uganda, the United Kingdom and the United States. In the United States, where an estimated 25,000 to 50,000 South Sudanese reside, polling booths were opened in eight states: Virginia, Massachusetts, Illinois, Texas, Tennessee, Nebraska, Arizona and Washington. Similar polling booths were set up in the Canadian cities of Calgary and Toronto, to cater to the South Sudanese population there; an estimated 40,000 to 50,000 Sudanese live in Canada, about 2,200 of whom had registered to vote in either of the two cities.

Members of the South Sudanese diaspora have been split as to their support for or against separation; members of some tribes advocate unity, while members of other tribes supported separation. Some Canadian South Sudanese have called for a boycott of the referendum, accusing the International Organization for Migration, which was tasked with operating the vote in that country, of "being influenced by the government in Khartoum." Calgary-based journalist Mading Ngor of The New Sudan Vision dismissed these claims as "a conspiracy theory," adding "It's a very fragmented community here along tribal lines." Although over 99% of those in the South voted for independence, 42% of those who lived in the north at the time voted for unity.

== See also ==
- South Sudanese Americans
- South Sudanese Australians
- South Sudanese Canadians
- Embassy of South Sudan, London
- Refugees of South Sudan
