= Ndogo language =

Ubangian language of South Sudan

Ndogo
- Region: South Sudan
- Ethnicity: Ndogo
- Native speakers: 48,000 (2017)
- Language family: Ubangian: Seri–Mba; Sere; Sere–Bviri; Ndogo

Language codes
- ISO 639-3: ndz
- Glottolog: ndog1248

Ndogo is a Ubangian language, one of the nine major languages of South Sudan, and is taught in primary school. It is used as a secondary language by the Gollo and some of the Gbaya, among others.

A 2013 survey reported that ethnic Ndogo reside in Besselia and Mboro Bomas, Beselia Payam, Wau County, South Sudan.
