= Wol Akec Akol =

South Sudanese politician

Colonel Wol Akec Akol is a South Sudanese politician and military figure. He has served as Minister of Agriculture of Western Bahr el Ghazal since 18 May 2010.
