= John Peter Miskin =

South Sudanese lawyer and politician

Mowlana John Peter Miskin is a South Sudanese lawyer and politician. He has served as Minister of Legal Affairs of Western Bahr el Ghazal since 18 May 2010.
