= Sere language =

Ubangian language of DR Congo

Sere
- Region: Democratic Republic of the Congo
- Ethnicity: Sere
- Native speakers: (2,500 in DRC cited 1971?); 30 in CAR (1988 census)
- Language family: Ubangian: Seri–Mba; Sere; Sere–Bviri; Sere

Language codes
- ISO 639-3: swf
- Glottolog: sere1264

Sere is a minor Ubangian language of the northeastern Democratic Republic of the Congo. The name is variously spelled Serre, Shaire, Shere, Sheri, Sili, Siri, French Chere or prefixed as Basili, Basiri.
