= Bai language (South Sudan) =

Ubangian language spoken in South Sudan

Bai
- Bari
- Native to: South Sudan
- Ethnicity: Bai
- Native speakers: (2,500 cited 1971)
- Language family: Niger–Congo?: Atlantic–Congo; Volta–Congo; Savanna?; Ubangian; Seri–Mba; Sere; Sere–Bviri; Bai

Language codes
- ISO 639-3: bdj
- Glottolog: baii1251
- ELP: Bai

Bai (Belanda, Biri, BGamba, Gumba, Mbegumba, Mvegumba) is a Ubangian language of South Sudan.

As of 2013, ethnic Bai reside in Khorgana Boma, Beselia Payam, Wau County.
