= Gulf Today =

English-language newspaper

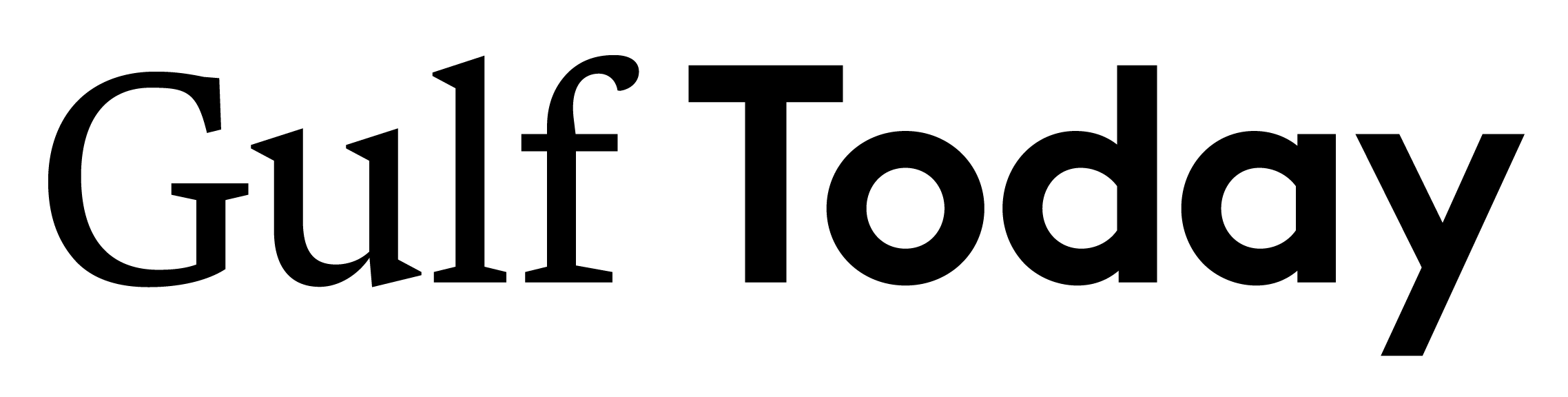
- Type: Daily newspaper
- Format: Broadsheet
- Publisher: Dar Al Khaleej
- Founded: 15 April 1996; 29 years ago
- Language: English
- Headquarters: Sharjah
- Sister newspapers: Al Khaleej
- Website: gulftoday.ae

Gulf Today is an English-language daily newspaper based in Sharjah, the United Arab Emirates. It is one of the four UAE broadsheet newspapers.

The newspaper was launched on 15 April 1996 by brothers Taryam Omran Taryam and Abdullah Omran Taryam, owners of Dar Al Khaleej for Press, Printing and Publishing.

The Dar Al Khaleej group also publishes Al Khaleej, an Arabic daily broadsheet newspaper.

Gulf Today publishes an all-colour magazine, Panorama, which is distributed free with the daily at the weekends. Panorama covers film, sports, literature, politics and entertainment from Hollywood to Bollywood. The editor in chief is Aysha Taryam.
