= Ferdinand Goi =

- Born: 1935; Baggari, Anglo-Egyptian Sudan
- Died: 8 November 1970 (aged 34–35) Gulu, Uganda
- Allegiance: Anyanya (1963–1970)
- Conflicts: First Sudanese Civil War

Lt. Ferdinand Ukelo Goi (1935 - 8 November 1970) was a pastor and military commander of Anyanya from Southern Sudan.

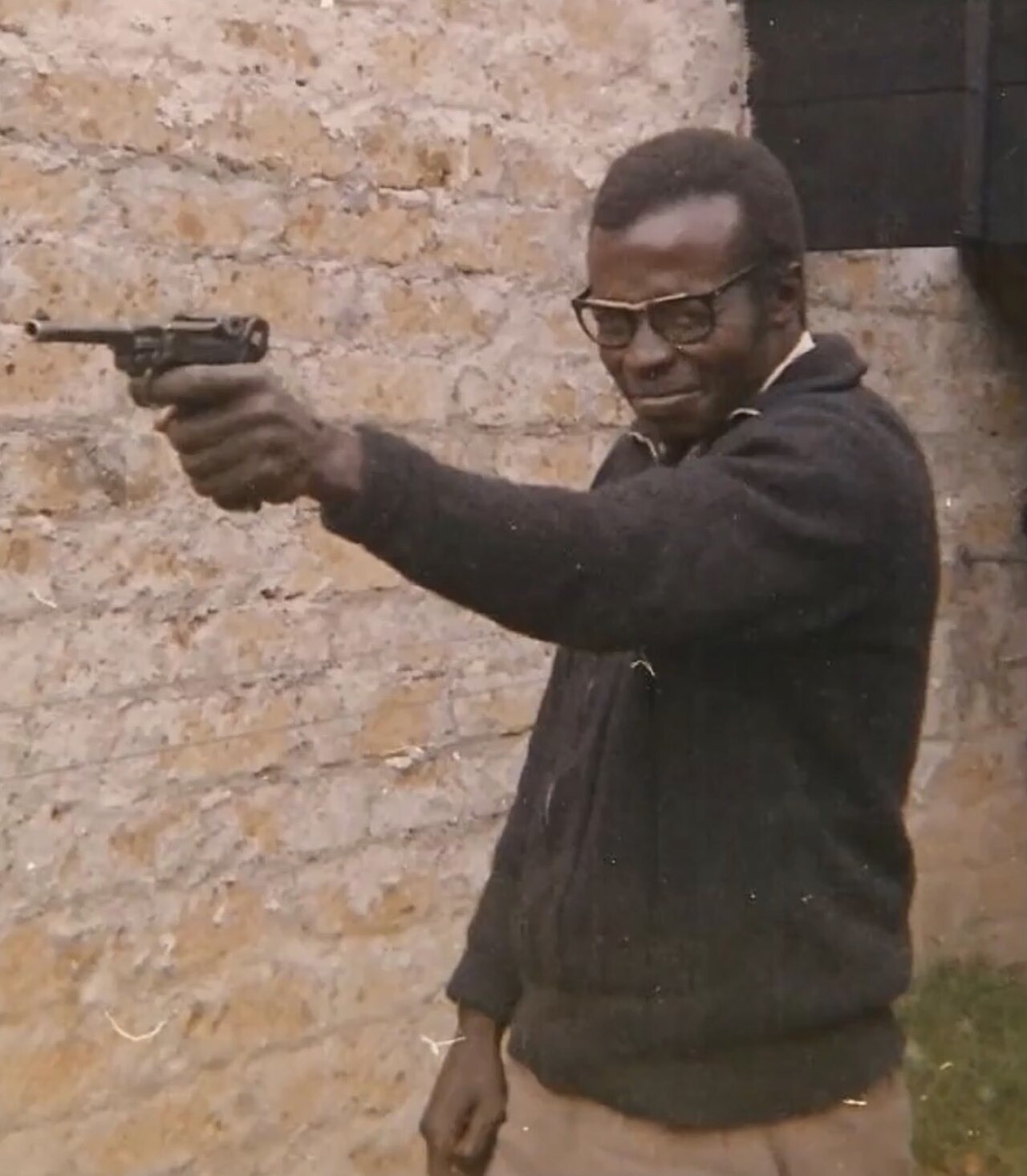
Goi at shooting range in Cordonnia, Maccerata Province.

== Early life and education ==
Belonging to Balanda Bviri, Goi was born in 1935 in Baggari near Wau. He had a younger sister, and he studied for the priesthood at minor seminary in Bussere for two years (1956-1958). Afterward, he enrolled in a seminary in Milan. While living in Milan, he made contact with the SANU party's leadership in Congo and decided to join the rebel group.

== Rebellion career ==
Goi left Milan and joined the rebels in Wau in May 1963. He then established a camp in the Central African Republic. In November, he was appointed as the commander of Anyanya. In the same month, he lured two police officers in Bussere by falsely reporting that a fight had occurred two kilometers away, causing the deaths of two people. While accompanying the police to the scene, he killed them and took their rifles and uniforms.

In July 1964, Goi established a camp from the Central African Republic to Bakiri, an area located between Tumbura and the border. From Bakiri's camp, he carried out ambush attacks on police and military posts. On 9 November 1964, he issued a letter urging the Southern Sudanese not to rely on outside help in fighting the government and requesting that civilians who possessed weapons hand them over to the rebels.

Goi received a huge amount of money from Wau in 1965. Through that donation, he was able to buy modern weapons from Congo and carried out attacks in Tumbura and Source Yubu. During the attack on both localities, he reportedly killed 18 police officers single-handedly with a machine gun. His attack in Tumbura was so intense that the town was under siege and almost fell to the rebels. By the end of 1965, he became the main commander of Anyanya in western Bahr el Ghazal after ousting Filbert Ucini Vomongo. Due to his activity, he became the government's fugitive. During the Battle of Kpaile in 1966, he sustained an injury that left his right hand paralyzed, forcing him to fight only with his left hand.

Anyanya soon fell into division among its political leaders, causing Goi to lose confidence in the organization's leadership. Soon, he left the camp for the Central African Republic, East Africa, and then Angudri. In Angudri, he led the coup attempt against the ALF leadership on 20 February 1967. However, the coup attempt failed, and he fell sick and returned to Bahr el Ghazal in March 1967. Later, his soldiers arrested him for trying to stage a coup against the ALF leadership. He was released three months later by Frederick Fodul.

Upon Goi's release from imprisonment, his influence within the rank waned, causing him to leave Bahr el Ghazal at the end of 1968. Afterward, Aggrey Jaden offered him a position as Deputy Minister of Defense, which he declined. In 1969, he became the Deputy Minister of Defense under the Anyidi Revolutionary Government.

== Late life ==
Goi soon fell into heart disease, causing him to go to Italy in 1969 for medical treatment. In March 1970, he stayed in Italy for three months, where he lobbied several Italians to provide support for Anyanya. Through his lobby, Anyanya received military uniforms, money, and medical supplies from Italy. He died on 8 November 1970 in St Mary's Hospital with his wife Anna Kadimela beside him in Gulu from complications of heart disease, malaria, and sleeping sickness. Goi is survived by his nieces, nephews, and great nieces and nephews across the United States, Canada, and Italy.

== Bibliography ==
- McCall, Storrs (1972). Unpublished manuscript on the history of the first civil war in South Sudan (Anya-Nya). Sudan Open Archive (Report). London: Sudan Open Archive.
