= Abdullah Omran Taryam =

Emirati businessman

- عبدالله عمران تريم

Minister of Justice
- In office 9 December 1971 – 19 February 1972
- President: Zayed bin Sultan Al Nahyan
- Prime Minister: Maktoum bin Rashid Al Maktoum; Rashid bin Saeed Al Maktoum
- Preceded by: Office established
- Succeeded by: Ahmad Bin Sultan Al Qasimi
- In office 20 November 1990 – 25 March 1997
- President: Zayed bin Sultan Al Nahyan
- Prime Minister: Maktoum bin Rashid Al Maktoum
- Preceded by: Office established
- Succeeded by: Office abolished

Minister of Education
- In office 19 February 1972 – 01 July 1979
- President: Zayed bin Sultan Al Nahyan
- Prime Minister: Maktoum bin Rashid Al Maktoum; Rashid bin Saeed Al Maktoum
- Preceded by: Sultan bin Muhammad Al-Qasimi
- Succeeded by: Saeed Mohammed Salman

Personal details
- Born: 1948 Sharjah, Trucial States
- Died: 30 January 2014 (aged 65–66)
- Relatives: Taryam Omran Taryam (brother)
- Education: University of Cairo; University of Exeter
- Known for: co-founder of Dar Al Khaleej Printing & Publishing

Abdullah Omran Taryam (1948–2014) was the co-founder of Dar Al Khaleej Printing & Publishing, the publishing house based in Sharjah, United Arab Emirates. Together with his brother, Taryam Omran Taryam, he founded the first UAE daily national newspaper Al Khaleej, as well as the English-language daily Gulf Today.

== Early life ==
Abdullah Omran Taryam was born in Sharjah in 1948 and educated in Sharjah and Kuwait. He received a Bachelor's degree in history from the University of Cairo in 1966, then completed his doctorate in modern history at the University of Exeter in the United Kingdom in 1986.

In 1970, Abdullah co-founded Dar Al Khaleej together with his brother Taryam, and launched a weekly magazine Al Shurouq. This was followed on 19 October 1970 with the launch of Al Khaleej, the first newspaper in what was then the Trucial State of Sharjah. On 15 April 1996, the brothers subsequently launched the English language national daily Gulf Today.

Abdullah worked as a secondary school teacher at Al Orouba School before becoming Director of the Department of Education in Sharjah.

== Political career ==
Together with his brother, Abdullah was part of the team that negotiated the establishment of the union of the United Arab Emirates, which became independent on 2 December 1971.

Abdullah Taryam was the UAE's first Minister of Justice from 1971 to 1972, going on to serve as UAE Minister of Education from 1972 to 1979. He served a second term as Minister of Justice from 1990 to 1997.

Together with his brother, Abdullah developed Dar Al Khaleej's stable of titles to include two newspapers, two weekly and two monthly magazines. He was a prominent journalist and author as well as a businessman, and was the author of The Establishment of the United Arab Emirates 1950-85, published by Routledge. He was described as a "role model" in the field of journalism. In 2002, together with Taryam he launched the annual Taryam and Abdullah Omran Press Award.

Abdullah Omran Taryam died on 30 January 2014 of a stroke. His passing was marked by national mourning.
