= Morris Yel Akol =

South Sudanese politician

Minister of Finance of Western Bahr el Ghazal
- In office 18 May 2010 – 9 September 2013
- Preceded by: Office established
- Succeeded by: Lillian Valentino Rizik

Personal details
- Born: 1969 (age 56–57)

Morris Yel Akol is a South Sudanese politician. He has served as Minister of Finance of Western Bahr el Ghazal from 18 May 2010 to 9 September 2013.
