= Belanda Viri language =

Ubangian language of South Sudan

Belanda Viri
- Bviri
- Native to: South Sudan
- Ethnicity: Balanda Bviri
- Native speakers: 73,000 (2017)
- Language family: Niger–Congo: Atlantic–Congo; Volta–Congo; Ubangian; Seri–Mba; Sere; Sere–Bviri; Belanda Viri

Language codes
- ISO 639-3: bvi
- Glottolog: bela1255

Belanda Viri (Bviri, Belanda, Biri, BGamba, Gumba, Mbegumba, Mvegumba) is a Ubangian language of South Sudan.

== Locations ==
A 2013 survey reported that ethnic Balanda reside in the following payams of South Sudan.

- Bagari Payam, Wau County (in Momoi, Biringi, Ngo-Alima B, Bagari, Ngodakala, Farajala, and Ngisa bomas)
- Bazia Payam, Wau County (in Taban, Gittan, Maju, Kpaile, and Gugumaba bomas)
- Diem Zeber Payam, Raga County (in Uyujuku Centre boma)
- Tambura County ( Tambura and Mupoi Payams), Nagero County ( Namatina and Duma payams, Di Ayanga and Ngogala Bomas), Ezo County (Yangiri Payam and Moso Boma), Nzara County and Yambio County (Nadiangere and Ri Rangu Payams) of Western Equatoria State of South Sudan.
