= Tagbo language =

Ubangian language spoken in DR Congo

Tagbo
- Region: Democratic Republic of the Congo
- Ethnicity: Tagbo
- Native speakers: 17,000 (2002)
- Language family: Ubangian: Seri–Mba; Sere; Sere–Bviri; Tagbo

Language codes
- ISO 639-3: tbm
- Glottolog: tagb1255

Tagbo (Tagbu, Tagba) is a Ubangian language of Democratic Republic of the Congo.
