= Jarvis Yak =

Sudanese politician

- جيرفس ياك

Governor of Khartoum

Member of the Third Sudanese Sovereignty Council
- In office 10 june 1965 – 25 May 1969

Minister of Irrigation and Hydro-electric Power

Personal details
- Children: Mary Jarvis Yak; Anthony Jarvis Yak; Constantine Jarvis Yak
- Occupation: Politician • Administrator

Jarvis Yak (Arabic: جيرفس ياك) was a Sudanese Governor Khartoum, a former minister, and administrator who worked in most of the northern states since the 1950s.

== Biography ==
Yak was the Irrigation and Hydro- electric Power minister before joining the Third Sudanese Sovereignty Council (10 June 1965 – 25 May 1969) as to represent the Southern Sudan region, which consisted of five members, and its members were amended twice to include Yak on 27 May 1968. The council that came after general parliamentary elections in 1965, the third in the history of Sudan, as it replaced the Second Sudanese Sovereignty Council, which was managing the country's affairs for a transitional period after the overthrow of the rule of Lieutenant General Ibrahim Abboud. The Chairman of the Sovereignty Council was Ismail al-Azhari. The council was dissolved after Lieutenant General Jaafar al-Numeiri's 1969 coup against power, who in turn formed the Revolutionary Command Council, which replaced the Sovereignty Council.

During Jaafar Nimeiry era, Yak served as the Governor of Khartoum, being the only southern Sudanese to hold the position.

Yak was a close friend of John Garang. Garang wrote to Yak before his execution "Do not be sad, my friend, for it is like a plane landing in the open sea".

== Personal life ==
Jarvis Yak son, Anthony, was born in Wau, Western Bahr el Ghazal and a member of the Supreme Committee for Supporting the Referendum in the South and a leader in the National Congress Party. His daughter, Mary Jarvis Yak was educated at the University of Khartoum before becoming a politician in South Sudan. Constantine Jarvis Yak, Yak's son, is the parliamentary representative for the Sudanese-African Parties Bloc in the Sudanese National Council. His granddaughter, Elizabeth Constantine Jarvis Yak, was part of the Southern Students Association at the University of Khartoum before South Sudan independence.
