= Yulu language =

Central Sudanic language spoken in Africa

Yulu
- Binga
- Native to: Central African Republic, Democratic Republic of Congo, South Sudan, Sudan
- Ethnicity: Yulu, Binga
- Native speakers: (13,000 cited 1987–2011)
- Language family: Nilo-Saharan?: Central Sudanic; Bongo–Bagirmi; Yulu
- Dialects: Yulu; Binga

Language codes
- ISO 639-3: yul
- Glottolog: yulu1243
- ELP: Yulu
- Yulu is classified as Vulnerable by the UNESCO Atlas of the World's Languages in Danger.

Yulu (also spelled Youlou, pronounced [juːluː]) is a Central Sudanic language spoken by the Yulu people of South Sudan and the Central African Republic (CAR). It has an estimated 7,000–13,000 speakers.

Yulu is classified as a Central Sudanic language of the Bongo–Bagirmi branch. It has been written using Latin script (with adjustments for sounds with no corresponding letters) since the Rejaf Language Conference in 1928 attempted to standardize a writing system for the region's indigenous languages.

Many Sudanese people prefer to speak Arabic; however, there is a new movement to promote the instruction of local languages in school. This is particularly because a large proportion of speakers are not literate in Yulu. Between 30 and 50 languages are spoken in South Sudan; Yulu was not recommended by the Rejaf Language Conference to be taught in schools, possibly contributing to its endangerment.

Yulu has four tones in speech: high, mid, low and extra-low. One of its defining features is the use of compound verbs. Compound verbs are a cluster of between two and four related verbs that create meaning when combined. Some of the most comprehensive linguistic information on Yulu was written by Stefano Santandrea, a Catholic priest from Rome who lived in Bahr al-Ghazal for several decades.

== Classification ==
Yulu has been geographically classified differently by different experts, some of whom refer to it as "Central Sudanic", some as "Eastern Sudanic", and still others as "West-Central Sudanic". Boyeldieu and Greenberg both place it in the "Bongo-Bagirmi" group of languages, while Tucker and Bryan refer to it as a "non-Bantu language of north-eastern Africa". Yulu is similar to Binga, the two being mutually intelligible, and there is debate as to whether they are separate languages or dialects of one. The Rejaf Language Conference classified the two as one language, and Gabjanda agrees that it makes more sense to see them as dialects of the same language. Santandrea, meanwhile, says that Yulu is the standard form, as opposed to a dialect. The vocabulary between the two languages does differ significantly. Yulu also shares certain linguistic features with Gula and Modo, and both cultural and linguistic features with Kara and Binga.

== History ==
The Yulu population itself only numbers some thousands, and subsists mostly on agriculture, hunting, and honey production. They are not assumed to be indigenous to the region they currently inhabit, and the mythology surrounding the Yulu's origin tells that they migrated northwest through Fur from the Blue Nile to reach the area of Sudan where they currently reside. Later, some Yulu were pushed farther west into the CAR.

Many Yulu speakers prefer speaking Arabic, the official language of Sudan and one which was embraced by the academic community. In 1960, Arabic was required in education past grade 3 and through university. The Navaisha Peace agreement added more flexibility, though, by allowing small provinces to adopt local languages as official ones. Teachers and academics in the Bahr el-Ghazal region of Sudan have pushed for the more widespread use of local languages in schools, specifically pointing out that many, including Yulu, survived in books published by Catholic missionaries, which should be taken advantage of.

== Geographic distribution ==
Linguistic map of the non-Arab peoples of Darfur

Yulu is not the dominant indigenous language in the region within which it is spoken, however, it is used over a wide geographic area, consequently making it difficult to know how many speakers there are. The estimated 7,000 speakers are divided between roughly 4,000 in the CAR and 3,000 in Sudan. Within the CAR, the language is spoken in the Ouanda Djallé and Ouadda sub-prefectures, while in Sudan it is primarily spoken in the southwestern area of Darfur and Western Bahr el-Ghazal.

A 2013 survey reported that ethnic Yulu reside in Dem Jalab Boma, Ringi Payam, Raja County, South Sudan.

== Phonology ==
=== Consonants ===
The following table provides an overview of the consonant phonemes.

		Labial	Alveolar	Post-alveolar	Velar	Labial-velar	Glottal
Nasal		m	n	ɲ	ŋ		
Stop/ Affricate	voiceless	p	t	t͡ʃ	k	k͡p	ʔ
Stop/ Affricate	voiced	b	d	d͡ʒ	g	ɡ͡b	
Stop/ Affricate	prenasal	ᵐb	ⁿd	ᶮd͡ʒ	ᵑɡ		
Stop/ Affricate	implosive	ɓ	ɗ		ɠ		
Fricative	voiceless	f	s				h
Fricative	voiced	v	z				
Rhotic			r				
Approximant			l	(j)		(w)	

=== Vowels ===
The following table provides an overview of the vowel phonemes.

	Front	Central	Back
Close	i		u
Mid	e		o
Open		a	

/i, u/ are heard as [j, w] in peripheral positions.

==== Vowel realizations ====
Four of the vowel phonemes allophonically assume different vowel lengths depending on whether they have a high tone or a falling tone. Two of them also alternate vowel quality. /a/ does not face this alternation.

Tone-based vowel realizations of Yulu vowels
	High	Falling
/e/	e	ɛː
/o/	o	ɔː
/i/	i	iː
/u/	u	uː

== Grammar ==
One of Yulu's distinctive features is its system of four tones, classified as high, mid, low, and extra-low. It also boasts a relatively distinctive phenomenon of clustering verbs, anywhere between two and four at a time. These clusters work together to describe one process as if it were a single verb, and are not always distinguishable from one another within the cluster, in part because when one verb in a cluster ends in a vowel and the next verb begins with one, the two sounds overlap. These clusters are common in texts, and occur roughly 75% as often as single verbs. Verbs in Yulu always have a subject marker as well as a verb stem, and sometimes contain a verbal dependency or verbal plural marker.

== Writing system ==
The Rejaf Language Conference recommended adopting the Latin script, with adjustments for the sounds that do not exist within it, as Yulu's writing system.

== Bibliography ==
- Gabjanda, James Dahab (1976). An axiomatic functionalist analysis of the phonology of Yulu (Thesis). The University of St Andrews. hdl:10023/2642.
