= Tagbu people =

Tagbu is an ethnic group in the Democratic Republic of the Congo and Sudan. They speak Tagbu, a Ubangian language. Tagbu speakers were estimated to number 17,000 in 2002.
