= Bai people (South Sudan) =

Ethnic group in South Sudan

Regions with significant populations
- Western Bahr el Ghazal

Languages
- Bai language

Religion
- African traditional religion; Islam

The Bai people are an ethnic group speaking the Bai language in South Sudan. The Bai language is a Niger–Congo language. There are several thousand Bai. The Bai people mostly inhabit the Southern Sudanese state of Western Bahr el Ghazal. Their population declined likely due to centuries of slave raids and invasions.

== Religion ==
Little is known about the Bai peoples' religion, but it can be assumed that they practice traditional African religion. Many have converted to Islam.
