= Binga people =

Ethnic group in South Sudan

The Binga are an ethnic group living in the South Sudanese state of Western Bahr el Ghazal and in Darfur. They speak a dialect of Yulu.
