= Gollo people =

Ethnic group in South Sudan

The Golo or Gollo are an ethnic group living in the South Sudanese state of Western Bahr el Ghazal. The area occupied by the Gollo lies to the west of the town of Wau and is delimited by Deil Zubier (North), the source of the Mbomou River (east), the confluence of the Wara River (west) and the Kpango River (south). The most important settlements are Kayango, Abushakka, Manga.

Their language, Golomo (meaning "Golo language" or "Golo speech"), may belong to the Sere group of languages.

The society is mainly agrarian, with little trade with neighboring tribes.

The tribe has been plagued by multiple upheavals that has seen its numbers reduced to several thousand in recent times and has eroded its political organization.
