= Balanda Bviri people =

The Balanda Bviri are an ethnic group living in the South Sudanese states of Western Bahr el Ghazal and Western Equatoria. They speak Bviri, one of the Ubangian languages.

The Balanda Bviri live in both Western Equatoria (Tambura, Nagero, Namatina, Mopoi, Yangiri, Nadiangere, Kobir Bawo) and Western Bahar El Ghazal (Bazia, Bagari and Dem Zubier).

== Notable people ==
- Ferdinand Goi, Anyanya commander
