= Nyamusa people =

Ethnic groups in South Sodan

Regions with significant populations
- Western Equatoria

Languages
- Nyamusa-Molo

Religion
- predominantly traditional African religion

The Nyamusa are an ethnic group of Western Equatoria in South Sudan. They speak Nyamusa-Molo, a Central Sudanic language.
