= Ndogo people =

Ndogo
Regions with significant populations
- South Sudan: 43,000
- DR Congo: 8,100

Languages
- Ndogo

Religion
- Christianism and Animism

Related ethnic groups
- Sere, Tagbu

The Ndogo are an ethnic group from Western Bahr el Ghazal in South Sudan, part of the Fertit.

They have an estimated population of 40,000, scattered around Wau, Raga and Deim Zubier.
