= Dar Al Khaleej =

Emirati publishing company

Dar Al Khaleej Printing & Publishing (Arabic: دار الخليج للطباعة والنشر) is a publishing house based in Sharjah, United Arab Emirates. It was established in 1970 by brothers Taryam Omran Taryam and Abdullah Omran Taryam, initially publishing the Arabic-language newspaper Al Khaleej.

The publishing group subsequently expanded its activities to include the English-language daily Gulf Today, magazines and the Al Khaleej Studies Centre.

== History ==
=== Founding ===
Dar Al Khaleej was founded in 1970 by Taryam Omran Taryam and Abdullah Omran Taryam. The first issue of Al Khaleej was published on 19 October 1970 in Sharjah.

At the time, newspaper printing facilities in the UAE were limited. Al Khaleej was initially printed in Kuwait and transported to the UAE for distribution.

The newspaper ceased publication in 1972 and resumed publication in 1980.

=== Expansion of publications ===
Following the resumption of Al Khaleej, Dar Al Khaleej expanded its publishing activities. Al Shuruq, which had initially been published as a monthly political magazine, was relaunched as a weekly publication in 1992. Kul Al Usrah, a magazine covering family and society, was launched in 1993.

The group launched the English-language daily Gulf Today, the monthly business magazine Al Iqtisadi and the children's magazine Al Azkiyaa in 1996.

Gulf Today was launched on 15 April 1996. Contemporary reference material on the newspaper identifies Dar Al Khaleej as its publisher and Al Khaleej as its sister newspaper.

== Al Khaleej Studies Centre ==
The Al Khaleej Studies Centre originated as a studies department established in 1980 following the resumption of Al Khaleej. It subsequently developed into a specialised unit in 1999 and became a studies centre in 2004.

The centre publishes books, research and reports and organises scientific, cultural and intellectual seminars and conferences.

== Digital publishing ==
Dar Al Khaleej operates digital publishing platforms in addition to its print publications. In 2021, Dar Al Khaleej and web development company Vardot received an Acquia Engage Award in the Media and Entertainment category for work on the publisher's digital platform.

Acquia reported that the redesigned platform produced an 83% increase in new users and an 83% increase in average time on the site, while the time required to publish content decreased by a factor of four. The project also involved the migration of more than 1.5 million articles and media items.

== Publications ==
Dar Al Khaleej has published several newspapers and magazines, including:

- Al Khaleej, an Arabic-language daily newspaper launched in 1970.
- Gulf Today, an English-language daily newspaper launched in 1996.
- Al Shuruq, a political magazine first published in 1970 and relaunched as a weekly in 1992.
- Kul Al Usrah, a magazine covering family and society, launched in 1993.
- Al Iqtisadi, a monthly business magazine launched in 1996.
- Al Azkiyaa, a children's magazine launched in 1996.
