= Taryam Omran Taryam =

Emirati businessman

- تريم عمران تريم

President of the Federal National Council
- In office 1977–1981
- Preceded by: Thani Abdullah Humaid
- Succeeded by: Hilal bin Ahmed bin Lootah

Personal details
- Born: 1942
- Died: May 16, 2002 (aged 59–60)
- Relatives: Abdullah Omran Taryam (brother)
- Known for: co-founder of Dar Al Khaleej Printing & Publishing

Taryam Omran Taryam (1942 – May 16, 2002) was the co-founder of Dar Al Khaleej Printing & Publishing, a publishing house based in Sharjah, United Arab Emirates. Together with his brother, Abdullah Omran Taryam, he founded the first UAE daily national newspaper Al Khaleej, as well as the English-language daily Gulf Today.

== Early life ==
Born in Sharjah in 1942 and educated in Sharjah and Kuwait, Taryam Omran Taryam completed his education with a degree from Egypt. In 1970, Taryam co-founded Dar Al Khaleej together with his brother Abdullah, and launched a weekly magazine, Al Shurouq. This was followed on 19 October 1970 with the launch of Al Khaleej, the first newspaper in what was then the Trucial State of Sharjah.

An active participant in the process leading to the establishment of the United Arab Emirates on 2 December 1971, he was subsequently appointed as the new nation's first Ambassador to Egypt and also the first UAE Permanent Ambassador to the Arab League. He was Speaker of the UAE Federal National Council (FNC) from 1977 to 1981. He subsequently focused on his business interests, developing Dar Al Khaleej's stable of titles to include two newspapers, two weekly and two monthly magazines. He was a prominent journalist as well as a businessman.

== Other interests ==
As well as chairing Dar Al Khaleej, Taryam served as Deputy Chairman of the Board of Trustees of the Sultan bin Al Owais Cultural Establishment, the Deputy Chairman of the Emirates Committee for Arab Integration, a board member of the Arab Unity Studies Centre and a member of the Gulf Development Forum. In 2002, together with Abdullah, he launched the annual Taryam and Abdullah Omran Press Award.

== Death ==
Taryam Omran Taryam died on May 16, 2002.
