= Jur Beli people =

Total population
- 78,000

Languages
- Beli

Religion
- Ethnic religions (60%) and Christianism (40%)

Related ethnic groups
- Bongo, Baka, Yulu, Binga, Kara

The Jur Beli (also, Jurbiel, Beli or Rubek Jur) are an ethnic group living in South Sudan.
