= Togoyo language =

Extinct Ubangian language of South Sudan

Togoyo
- Togoy
- Native to: South Sudan
- Extinct: Mid 1980s
- Language family: Ubangian: Seri–Mba; Sere; Indri–Togoyo; Togoyo

Language codes
- ISO 639-3: tgy
- Glottolog: togo1252

Togoyo (Togoy) is an extinct Ubangian language of South Sudan.
