= Sere languages =

Proposed Ubangian language family of Central Africa

Sere
- Sereic, Ndogoic, Sere–Ndogo
- Geographic distribution: South Sudan, Democratic Republic of the Congo
- Linguistic classification: Ubangian: Seri–Mba; Sere
- Subdivisions: Feroge–Mangaya; Indri–Togoyo; Sere–Bviri

Language codes
- ISO 639-3: –
- Glottolog: sere1262

The Sere languages (also called the Ndogoic or Sere–Ndogo languages) are a proposed family of Ubangian languages spoken in South Sudan and the Democratic Republic of the Congo. Several are endangered or extinct. The most populous Sere language is Ndogo of South Sudan, with about 30,000 speakers.

Traditionally classified as part of the Sere languages, Feroge–Mangayat and Indri–Togoyo could be separate groups that may not belong within Sere.

== Languages ==
Per Ethnologue 26, the structure of the family is as follows:

- Sere
  - Feroge–Mangaya
    - Feroge
    - Mangayat
  - Indri–Togoyo
    - Indri
    - Togoyo †
  - Sere–Bviri
    - Bai–Viri
      - Bai
      - Belanda Viri
    - Ndogo–Sere
      - Ndogo
      - Sere
      - Tagbu

Per Glottolog v4.8, the structure of the family is as follows:

- Sereic
  - Feroge–Mangaya
    - Feroge
    - Mangayat
  - Sere–Indri
    - Indri–Togoyo
      - Indri
      - Togoyo †
    - Sere–Bviri
      - Bai–Viri
        - Bai
        - Belanda Viri
      - Ndogo–Sere
        - Ndogo
        - Tagbu–Sere
          - Sere
          - Tagbu

Although the Sere–Bviri languages are clearly related to each other, it is not clear if they are related to Feroge–Mangayat and Indri–Togoyo. The recently extinct Indri–Togoyo languages have pronouns that look Niger–Congo, and are not similar to those of the other languages.
