= Mary Jarvis Yak =

South Sudanese politician

Deputy Minister of Finance and Planning
- Incumbent
- Assumed office 28 April 2016

Minister of Human Resource Development
- Incumbent
- Assumed office 10 July 2011

Personal details
- Parent: Jarvis Yak (father)
- Education: University of Khartoum
- Occupation: Politician

Mary Jarvis Yak, sometimes known as Mary Jarvase Yak, is a South Sudanese politician. As of 2016 she is the current deputy minister of Finance and Planning in the Transitional Government of National Unity (TGoNU) of the Republic of South Sudan, appointed by the President of the Republic of South Sudan -H.E. Salva Kiir on 28 April 2016.

== Education ==
Yak has earned a bachelor's degree in Economics from the University of Khartoum. She also has a master's degree in Gender and Development from the University of Sussex.

== Career ==
Yak has been a Member of Parliament for Southern Sudan, a woman's rights activist, and served as Chairperson of the Sudan Women Association.

Mary Jarvis Yak was the Minister for Human Resource Development in the Cabinet of South Sudan, being appointed on 10 July 2011. By 2012, Yak held the title of Deputy Minister of Planning. As Deputy Minister of Planning, Yak signed a protocol agreement with African Development Bank Group, allowing South Sudan to become a member of the Bank Group. Yak advocated South Sudan joining the Bank Group as a way to foster social economic development and poverty reduction.

By 2013 Yak held the title of Deputy Minister of Finance and Economic Planning. As Deputy Minister of Finance and Economic Planning, Yak announced the government did not have the funds to regularly pay all salaries, but that the government could pay 2 months salary to civil servants.

She was appointed the Deputy Minister of Finance and Planning in the Transitional Government of National Unity (TGoNU) of the Republic of South Sudan, appointed by the President of the Republic of South Sudan -H.E. Salva Kiir on 28 April 2016. In February 2016, Yak and the United Nations Development Programme launched the Diagnostic Trade Integration Study to create economic development in South Sudan.

== See also ==
- SPLM
- SPLA
- Cabinet of South Sudan
- Jarvis Yak, Mary Jarvis Yak's father
