= Emmanuel Kembe =

Emmanuel Kembe (born January 9, 1969) is a Balanda South Sudanese reggae musician.

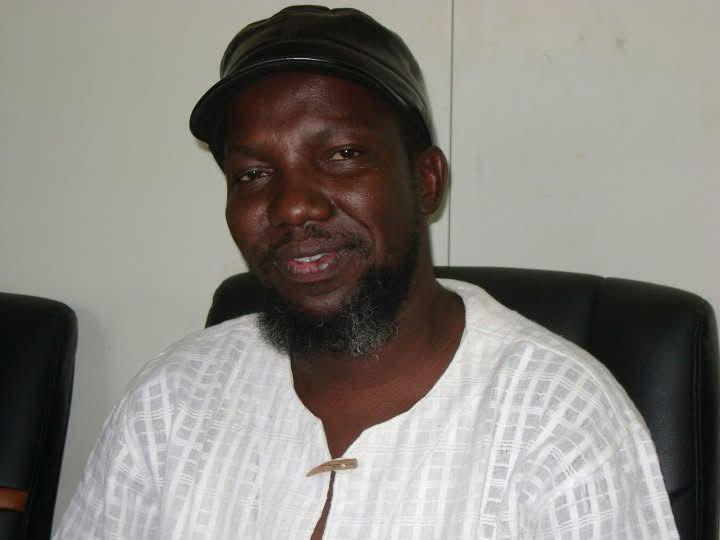
Visiting a friend.

== Biography ==
Emmanuel Mark Kembe was born in Wau, Western Bahr el-Ghazal, New Sudan, in the present Republic of South Sudan.

Kembe lived in exile between 1994 and 2005. Shen Shen was his first album.

== Music career ==
Born a singer songwriter singing mostly in English, his Pop-Reggae features, musician through his inspirational reggae music, Kembe has gained fame through the various works he has done by his music career. He founded Kembe Music International in 2010.

== Contributions ==
Kembe has performed songs about patriotism, peace and the reconstruction of the country and as a peace activist, he has majored in the cultural as well as diverse issues affecting the Country of South Sudan. He has performed in various concerts such as that organized by United Nations. He has carried out peace concerts aimed at bringing people together in the small country like South Sudan. Comedy for Peace organized by UNMISS had him perform in order to build connections and unity.
