= Baka people (Congo and South Sudan) =

African ethnic group

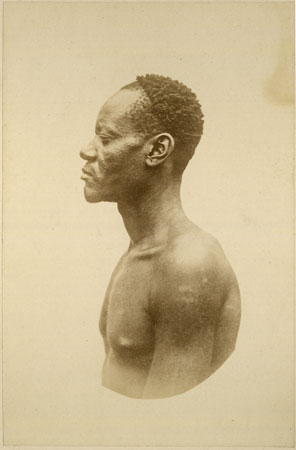
Baka man

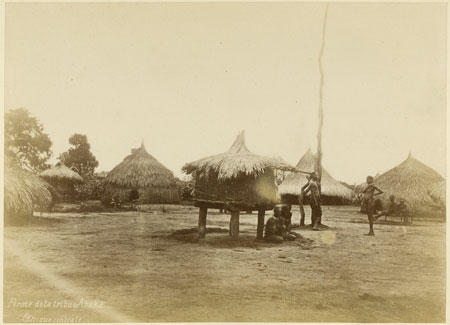
Baka homestead, late-19th century

The Baka is an ethnic group found in both South Sudan and in the Democratic Republic of the Congo. The majority the Baka people live in Western and Central Equatoria Regions in South Sudan. In South Sudan, the Baka people are mainly Christians and number about 65,000 people (1993).

The Baka are of the Central Sudanic group and they inhabit the land mass stretching from the Suuwe Stream to Logo around Yei. The majority of them have inhabited the areas of Maridi for thousands of years. Between 1926 and 1930, E. E. Evans-Pritchard, while conducting fieldwork in the Southern Sudan referred to the Baka people as the Central Sudanic group (not the Baka Pygmies of Congo and elsewhere) and they inhabit the areas of Maridi and Yei and they form the largest ethnic group in Maridi. Evans Pritchard further stated that the Baka people are linguistically akin to the Morokodo, Bongo, Nyamusa and ‘Beli of Southern Sudan.

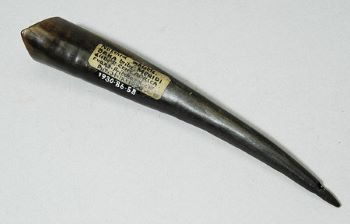
Baka Flute in 1930

Richard Buchta was an Austrian explorer in East Africa. A translation from his personal diary said: "I have visited the Baka people and tracked for months throughout their land of Maridi, southern part of the Sudan, and I experienced the wrath of the humidity from under the canopied forests, the freshness of the air from the mountains, the cooling drops from the rains, the soothing sounds from the flow of the streams from the highlands and the lulling sounds from the Baka songs. The Baka people of Sudan are truly masters of their forests, rivers, wild plants and mountains, and they are hunters and gatherers mixed with the practices of subsistence farming in patches of lands here and there in the deep forests. Above all they are excellent songsters of their jungles, and their songs are often interwoven with the echoes from the rolling mountains, responsive to the flowing rivers and bounces back from the flapping leaves of the trees of their lands. Even the birds and insects of the jungles sing back to the Baka songsters".

== Baka Legend and Creation Mythos ==
In Buchta's diary, he wrote: "the Baka people are mythical, and the essence of their mythology is the creation mythos which advanced a set of recurrent beliefs and fairy tales about the creation of the first man by Lomo (God). This mythos is embedded in a deep belief that according to legend, the first human being ever been created by Lomo (God) was a Baka man and Lomo named him Mái-yána (Mái-I am, yána – here), which means that I am here. Lomo then ordered Mái-yána to go to Ambingiri Mountain to sing and wait on the foot of the mountain for a companion. Mái-yána did exactly what Lomo instructed him to do. By dusk, he continued to sing and suddenly from a far distance, he heard beautiful voices of ladies singing along with him. The voices which drew closer and closer were of the seraphim ladies who were returning to enter into the mountain which happens to be their homestead. The ladies passed by Mái-yána and as the stone wall of Ambingiri Mountain opened up for the ladies to enter in, Mái-yána rushed and held one of the ladies by the arm and said to her "I know you". The lady replied that "I know you too". God immediately poured his blessings which came down from the mountain in the form of a heavy fog to cover Mái-yána and the seraphim lady. God then said to Mái-yána. "This is my daughter and I name her Mîîlumaa" (Mîîlu – I like or love it, maa – myself), which means I like or love it myself or by myself".

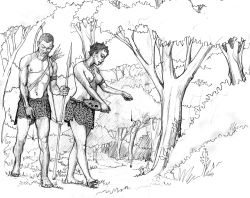
Planting the first coffee and ngofo

"As the fog cleared, God then handed to Mái-yána a bow and arrows and a spear. God turned to Mîîlumaa and gave her a kubi (a flat basket made out of reeds and grasses) containing three important seeds which are a Coffee seed, a seed of mgberi and a seed of Ngofo. God said to Mái-yána and his companion Mîîlumaa to go on a journey to Muroko forest to plant the seed of Ngofo and wait for it to grow into a big tree. From the Ngofo tree, Mái-yána must extract its buck to make many beehives in order for the bees to colonize it and make the best honey with a distinct tang and flavor. God also instructed Mái-yána to plant the one coffee seed under a tree canopy and watch over it to grow so that he and his companion can roast the coffee beans and to send its relishing aroma for God to enjoy and also for them to drink for generation to come. Finally, God instructed Mîîlumaa to plant and cultivate the seed of mgberi and make out of its harvests some of the best delicacies for them to eat and enjoy for generation to come".

Mái-yána and his companion Mîîlumaa therefore began their journey to Muroko forest which lasted 20 days and 20 nights. Mái-yána and Mîîlumaa schemed through the lush green land of Maridi; listening to the chirping birds, and the trilling and hissing insects; crossing cold and gushing streams; hiking and descending through mountains; and evading the ever drizzling and rain drops. According to legend, God then gave them leopard skin cloths to cover up and to keep them warm. God then said to Mái-yána and Mîîlumaa that with the leopard skin cloths, they must always sing and dance in expression of their feelings, emotions, sorrows, arts, and messages. So, before any of their singing and dancing performances, they must sing and chant the leopard's name so as to fend off the undesirable energy and invite in the leopard's agility and Vigor.

Mái-yána and Mîîlumaa arrived in Muroko forest and settled. They planted the seeds of coffee, mgberi and Ngofo. The seeds germinated and multiplied into healthy trees and creepers. Mái-yána and Mîîlumaa produced children and had grandchildren. They toured together the vast lush green land, the impenetrable forests, the rolling hills and the gushing rivers. As Mái-yána and his companion Mîîlumaa grew old, they gathered their children, the grandchildren and hiked into a range of mountains. After a few days they reach the summit of one of the mountains. They stood on the summit of the mountain and Mái-yána turned to his companion, children and grandchildren and chanted "Lomo ni bo, Lomo ni mongu eyii" (meaning is present and God is the Almighty) in acknowledgement of the wonders of God's creation. Mái-yána then sat down, leaned on one of the rocks and raised his hands to point towards the sunrise direction and said: "Put me to rest as I face that sunrise and when Mîîlumaa follows me, put her to rest next to me but to face the sunset". With these words he closed his eyes and passed on".

== Baka Spiritualism ==
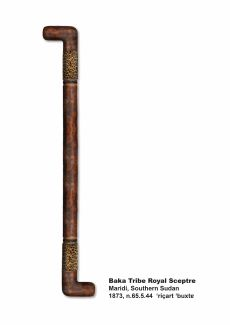
A picture of a Baka Tribe Royal Sceptre

‘riçart ‘buxtɐ (Richard Buchta) has also written that: "The most remarkable and unique nature of the Baka people is their spiritualism which is intertwined within their mythology. In the first place, the basis of the Baka people spiritualism is deeply rooted in their belief that a Baka man and woman are products of creation by one supernatural power known as Lomo, which is translated to mean God. This spiritualism and its distinctive emphasis on one God (Lomo) denote monotheism. Furthermore, the Baka spiritualism is also embedded into a creed which illustrates that the same one God (Lomo) can translate himself separately to each individual according to his or her required role in the community or family. Many times a Baka prayer is usually recited in a homestead by a call for the God of so and so, and the God of this or that person. This does not imply in any way that the Baka people believe in many Gods. It simply means that the same one God manifests himself separately to each and every person depending on the roles and powers God ascribes to him or her for intercession purposes. The purpose of such a call during prayers by the Baka is to place emphasis on the belief on the already ascribed roles and powers that God has granted. Above all, such a call of belief is a recognition that the same God's manifestation runs through the family or community's chain of consanguinity from time in memorial to the present and must be utilized during worship and plight.

Secondly, the Baka people spiritualism goes further to manifest itself in the roles and functions of the Baka Chiefs or Ngére (translated to mean lord). So all Baka Chiefs whether they are on official affirmation as Chiefs or not, are all believed to be ordained by God (Lomo). Thus each of the Chiefs (Ngére) has been granted specialized and distinct tasks and responsibilities which they are required to execute here on earth. In special times, Ngére can even conduct an act of intercession. As a result there is a Ngére for human fertility; a Ngére for protection; a Ngére for war; a Ngére for rituals; a Ngére for blessings; a Ngére for production and harvests; a Ngére for rain; a Ngére for wind, fog and fire; a Ngére for dispute management and justice, a Ngére for land, forests, mountains and rivers; a Ngére for artisan and blacksmith works, a Ngére for songs and folklore, a Ngére for conferment, a Ngére for constellation, a Ngére as an emissary and a Ngére for prophecy".
