= Indri people =

Muslim ethnic group of South Sudan

Total population
- c. 1,000

Regions with significant populations
- South Sudan

Languages
- Indri language

Religion
- Sunni Islam

Indri are the members of an ethnic group in Western Bahr el Ghazal, South Sudan. Most of them are Muslims. The total Indri population is around 1,000. They speak Indri, a Ubangian language.
