= Runcu, Vâlcea =

Runcu
- Commune
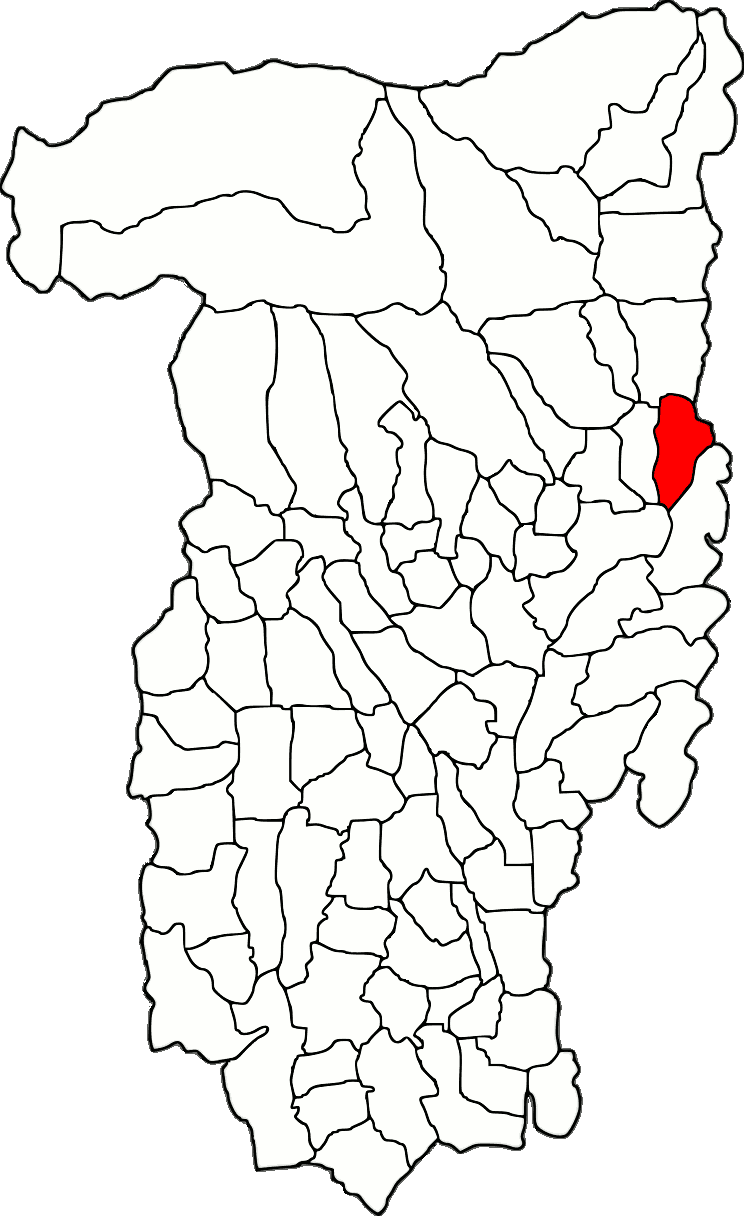
- Location in Vâlcea County

- Location in Romania
- Coordinates: 45°10′N 24°27′E
- Country: Romania
- County: Vâlcea
- Area: 51.62 km^{2} (19.93 sq mi)
- Population (2021-12-01): 860
  - Density: 17/km^{2} (43/sq mi)
- Time zone: UTC+02:00 (EET)
  - Summer (DST): UTC+03:00 (EEST)
- Vehicle reg.: VL

Runcu is a commune located in Vâlcea County, Muntenia, Romania. It is composed of seven villages: Căligi, Gropeni, Runcu, Snamăna, Surpați, Valea Babei and Vărateci.
