= Efisio Kon Uguak =

South Sudanese politician and military figure

Colonel Efisio Kon Uguak (~1920s – October 23, 2014) was a South Sudanese politician and military figure. He served as Deputy Governor and Minister of Administration of Western Bahr el Ghazal from 18 May 2010 until July 2011, when he was replaced by Morris Yel Akol Tiit.
