= Sere people =

The Sere are an ethnic group numbering over 10,000 living in the South Sudanese state of Western Bahr el Ghazal. Their old home was a place called Ndedegumbva or Ndedekumbva, said to be recorded on the maps of old explorers.

Their original country lies between the rivers Boku and Kere, though some of them were settled on the left of the river Boku. In local tradition, the Zande king Ikpiro sent some of his people to conquer the Sere, but they were utterly defeated, their leaders being caught, burnt to death, and torn to pieces. Ikpiro later came himself, destroying their land, killing numbers of old people, and enslaved the women and the young. The Sere combatants moved northward, but they were soon surrounded by the Azande troops. The Sere then took to their stony hills and hid in the caves. The Azande heaped up straw and wood all around them, and so the "flower" of the Sere were either burned alive or impaled when trying to flee.

Most of the Sere remained in their old country under Zande rule, where they occupied a territory of about 100 kilometres wide all around. Some of the Sere fled to the Bahr-el-Ghazal. After they had fled from the Azande, they settled on the left side of the river Pongo River (also spelled Kpango or Pango), south of the Wau-Dem-Zubeir, better known as simply Deim Zubeir. Their boundary north was the little stream Ngoku. They later fought with Azande again, and were driven eastward. Subsequent wars with a chief named Karamalla saw the not-so-numerous Sere community split in two, with some following the Azande under a king named Tombura, while others went with Karamalla. Among the former were Sere chiefs Dessi and Rihan Wademoyo, and among the latter was Rihan's elder brother, Farajalla Zubeir.

Dessi and Wademoyo were made members of the council of Tombura. Dessi later fell from grace with him and was killed. Wademoyo was afraid to suffer the same plight, but was able to prove that he was from a different clan than Dessi and was spared. When the Sudan government settled in the Bahr-el-Ghazal, large numbers of the Sere returned from the north, including Farajalla Zubeir, while others poured in from Tombora when they heard of the return of their old leaders. Some of these returning Sere, who came from the Zande settled on the left of the river Bussere, south-west of the Balanda Bviri, and Rihan was appointed to rule them. From there, they were brought on to the Balanda Circular Road, which goes from Wau-Dem-Zubeir to Mboro. Later, they were ordered to join the other Sere community on the left of the Kpango river, under Chief Bandas Vito Umbili, where they remain to this day.
