= Sopo, South Sudan =

Coordinates: 8°01′N 26°04′E

Sopo is a village located in the Bahr el Ghazal region of South Sudan. The village has a hospital.
