= Kaligi language =

Ubangian language spoken in South Sudan

Feroge
- Kaligi
- Native to: South Sudan
- Region: Western Bahr el Ghazal
- Ethnicity: Kaligi
- Native speakers: 26,000 (2017)
- Language family: Niger–Congo?: Atlantic–Congo; Volta–Congo; Adamawa–Ubangi; Ubangian; Seri–Mba; Sere; Feroge–Mangaya; Feroge

Language codes
- ISO 639-3: fer
- Glottolog: fero1244

Feroge (Feroghe), endonym Kaligi, is a Ubangian language of South Sudan.

As of 2013, ethnic Feroghe resided in Raja North Boma, Raja Payam, Raja County.
