= Mangayat people =

Mangayat
Total population
- 600

Regions with significant populations
- Western Bahr el Ghazal

Languages
- Mangayat

Religion
- Sunni Islam

The Mangayat (also, Bugwa and Bukwa) are an ethnic group living in the South Sudanese state of Western Bahr el Ghazal.

They speak Mangayat, an Ubangian language. The number of persons in this ethnic group likely is below 1000.
