= Al Khaleej (newspaper) =

Arabic-language broadsheet newspaper published in Sharjah

Al Khaleej الخليج
- Type: Daily newspaper
- Format: Broadsheet
- Founder(s): Taryam Omran Taryam and Abdullah Omran Taryam
- Publisher: Dar Al Khaleej
- Founded: 19 October 1970; 55 years ago
- Language: Arabic
- Headquarters: Sharjah, United Arab Emirates
- Circulation: 37,000 (2013)
- Sister newspapers: Gulf Today
- Website: Al Khaleej

Al Khaleej (Arabic: الخليج, lit. 'The Gulf') is a daily Arabic-language broadsheet newspaper published in Sharjah, United Arab Emirates by Dar Al Khaleej. The daily is the first newspaper published in the country.

== History ==
Al Khaleej was launched by brothers Taryam and Abdullah Omran Taryam on 19 October 1970. However, the paper was closed down because of financial difficulties on 22 February 1972 after nearly 300 issues. In 1979 it was relaunched as a daily with 16 pages. The sister daily of the paper is Gulf Today.

From 1980 to 1983 Adly Barsoum, an Egyptian journalist and writer, worked in the newspaper as deputy editor-in-chief and played a major role in the reformation and development of the newspaper. During the developing process Al Khaleej became one of the most important publications in the Arab States of the Persian Gulf. Adly Barsoum had made a major coverage while working at Al Khaleej when he was the only Arab journalist who entered Beirut during the Israeli invasion of the city in 1982, and he met with Yasser Arafat for one of the most important interviews during these crucial times.

The purchase of new printing equipment in the 1990s enabled the company to increase the number of pages and print other publications. Al Khaleej is now one of the most popular Arabic-language newspapers in the country. The estimated circulation of the daily in 2003 was 60,000 copies, making it the first in the country. It was 37,000 copies in 2013.

== Editing Staff ==
- Editor-in-chief: Khaled Abdullah Omran
- The executive editor-in-chief: Raed Barqawi
- Managing editor: Mahmood Hasuna
- Editor of economic affairs: Khoder Makki.
- Editor of local affairs: Jamal Aldwayri.
- Editor of political affairs: Ibrahim Maari
- Editor of news: Osman Alnimr
