= Yulu people =

Ethnic group in central Africa

Yulu is an ethnic group in Central African Republic, Democratic Republic of the Congo and South Sudan. They speak Yulu, a Central Sudanic language. The population of this group is at several thousand.
