= Jur Mananger people =

The Jur Mananger (or Mananger) are a Luo Nilotic ethnic group numbering 20,000 to 30,000 people living in Gogrial District of South Sudan. They speak a Western Nilotic language related to Luo and Shilluk.
