= Indri language =

Ubangian language of South Sudan

Indri
- Native to: South Sudan
- Ethnicity: Indri
- Native speakers: 700 (2007)
- Language family: Niger–Congo?: Atlantic–Congo; Volta–Congo; Adamawa–Ubangi; Ubangian; Seri–Mba; Sere; Indri–Togoyo; Indri
- Writing system: Unwritten

Language codes
- ISO 639-3: idr
- Glottolog: indr1247
- ELP: Indri

Indri (Yanderika, Yandirika) is a Ubangian language of South Sudan.
