= Wau County =

County of Western Bahr el Ghazal, South Sudan

- County
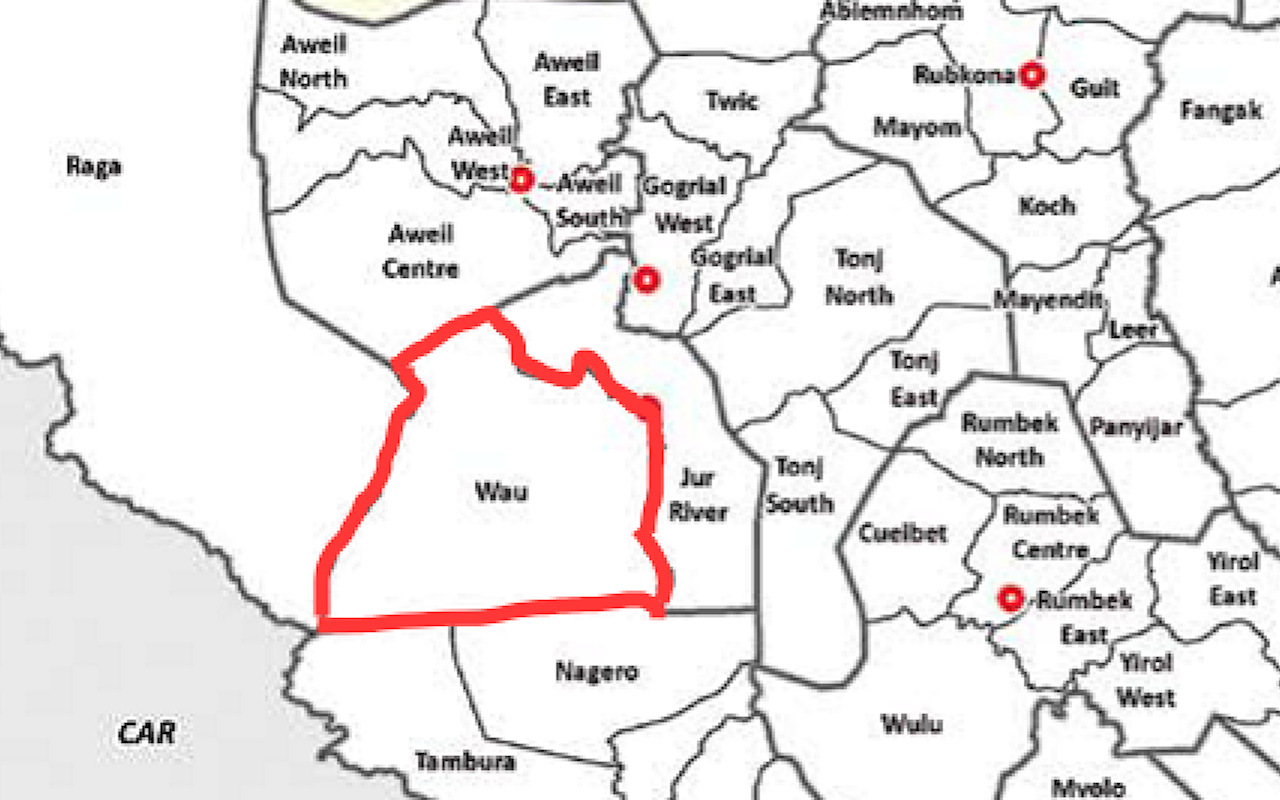
- Country: South Sudan
- Region: Bahr el Ghazal
- State: Western Bahr el Ghazal
- Named for: Wau (capital city)
- Seat: Wau

Area
  - Total: 19,251.27 km^{2} (7,432.96 sq mi)

Population
  - Total: 232,910
- Time zone: UTC+2 (CAT)

Wau County is a county in Western Bahr el Ghazal state, in the Bahr el Ghazal region of South Sudan. Wau County was home to the state's capital, Wau. It is the most populous county in the state with over 232,910 people.

The seat of Wau County is the third most populous city in South Sudan.

== Geography ==
Wau County is both the second largest and second smallest county in area of Western Bahr el Ghazal. It is surrounded by Raga County, Jur River County, Aweil Centre County (county of Northern Bahr el Ghazal), Nagero County and Tombura County (both counties of Western Equatoria).

Wau County is in the Northwest region of South Sudan, and is in the middle of Western Bahr el Ghazal.

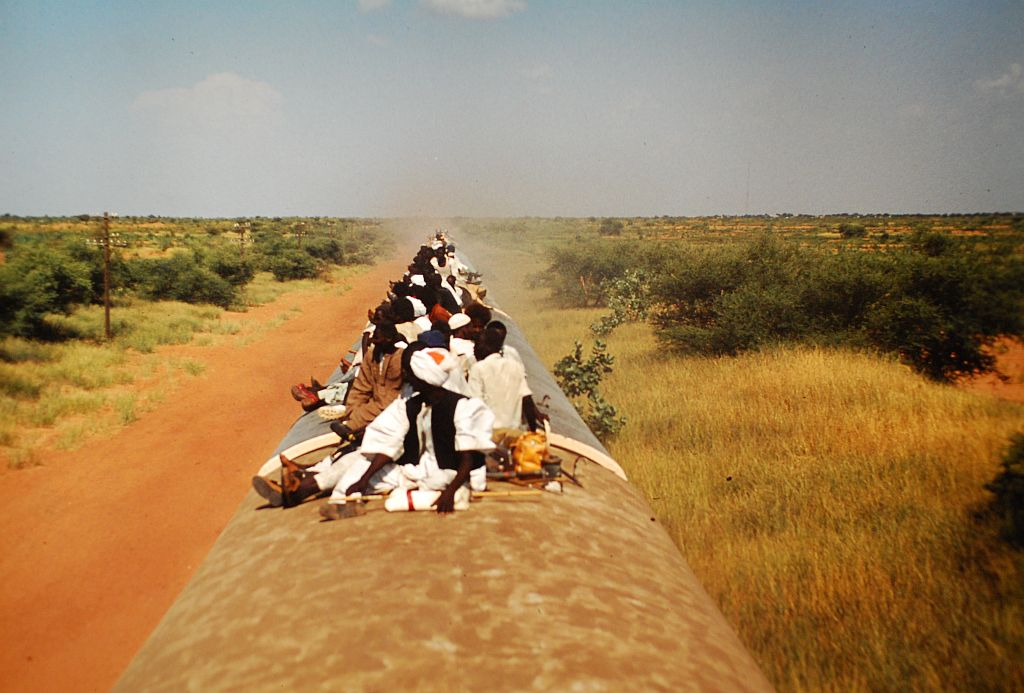
Train in Wau County

== Ethnic groups ==
As of 2013, ethnic groups reported in Wau County were Balanda, Azande, Bongo, Gollo, Ndogo, and Bai. Balanda made up the large ethnic group.
