= Kaligi people =

Sudanese Ethnic Group

Kaligi / Feroghe
Total population
- 10,000–23,000

Regions with significant populations
- Western Bahr el Ghazal

Languages
- Kaligi language

Religion
- Sunni Islam (80%) and Christianism (20%)

Related ethnic groups
- Other Ubangian peoples

The Kaligi (Arabic: Feroghe) are an ethnic group in South Sudan. Most of its members are Muslims. The number of persons in this group is above 10,000. They live in Western Bahr el Ghazal.

They originally lived scattered in an area between the Bora River to the south and Bahr al-Arab to the north. Their lack of unity as a people allowed them to be conquered by Darfur. During the 19th century the Kaligi were forced to migrate southwards due to the pressure of Mahdist campaigns against some local minorities. Sultan Ali Dinar's mother belonged to this ethnic group, which is why the sultan gifted the Kaligi with copper drums that they continue to play every Idd to this day.

There are seven Kaligi clans named after the sons of Hamad: Kara, Fartak, Osman, Taher, Abuzala, Aliga (Khalifa) and Abbakar.

Their economy is based on agriculture and copper deposits and they are considered very religious. Kaligi leaders were loyal to the north during the civil wars and after the 1989 Coup they joined the NIF, making the Kaligi people loyal to the new military regime. During NIF rule the Kaligi strengthened as the dominant minority in Bahr al-Ghazal.

== See also ==
- Kaligi language
