= Jur River County =

Coordinates: 7.9404°N 28.03041°E

- County
- Location in South Sudan
- Country: South Sudan
- Region: Bahr el Ghazal
- State: Western Bahr el Ghazal
- Headquarters: Nyin Akok

Area
  - Total: 3,878 sq mi (10,044 km^{2})

Population (2017 estimate)
  - Total: 181,402
  - Density: 46.777/sq mi (18.061/km^{2})
- Time zone: UTC+2 (CAT)

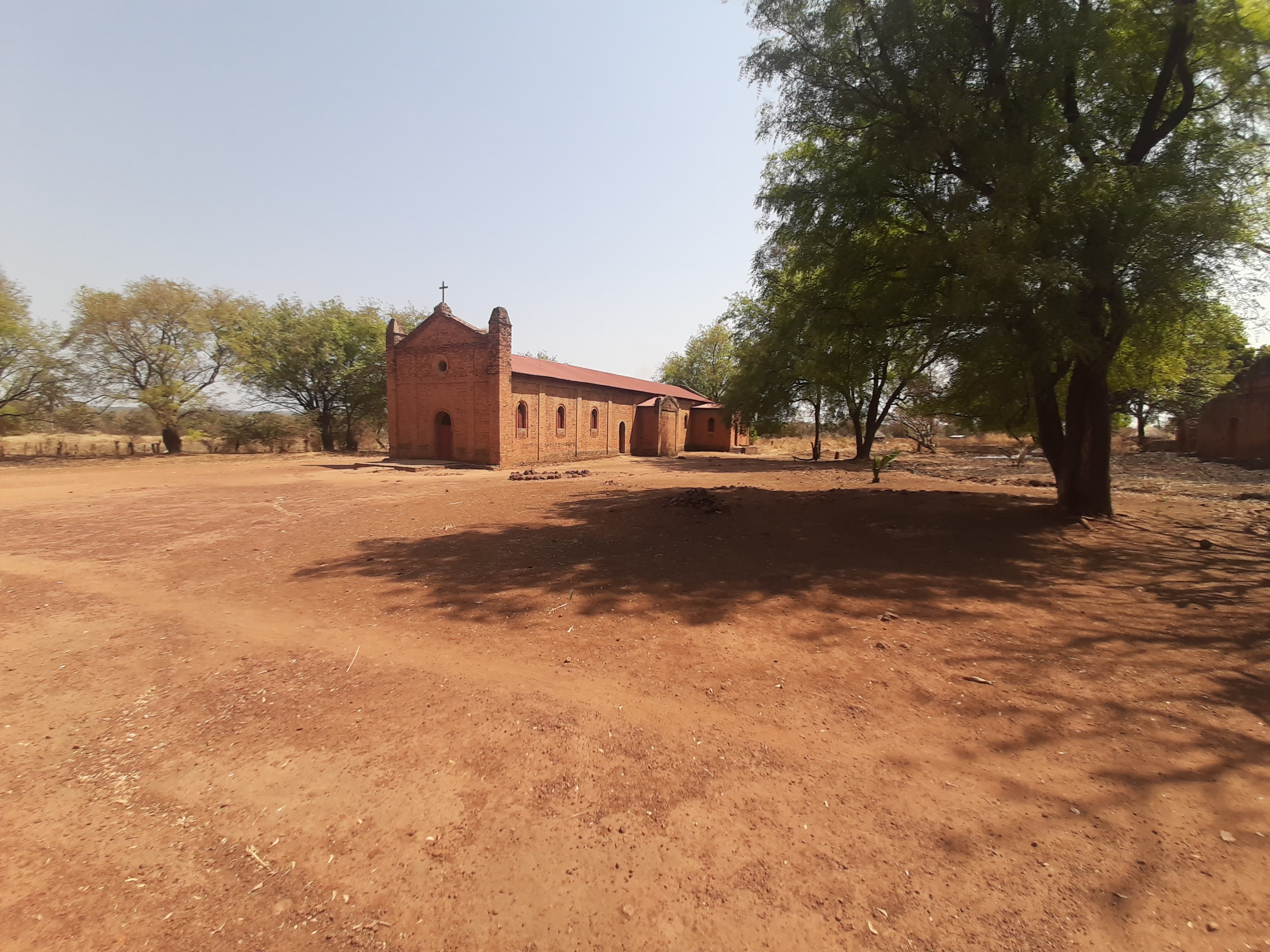

Jur River County is a county in the Western Bahr el Ghazal state in the Bahr el Ghazal region of South Sudan, located in east and northeast parts of the state, Jur River County is divided into five payams (districts): Kangi Payam, Udoci, Marial Bai, Rocrocdong, and Kuajiena. Each one of these Payms are further divided into several Bomas. Jur River County headquarters has been controversially relocated in 2012 by the state government to Nyin Akok Village on the eastern bank of the Jur River.

== Demographics ==
The county has a population of 127,771 inhabitants according to the 2008 census, most of them are from Luwo tribe, besides a minority of Dinka Marial Bai who lives in northeast of the county.

The list of Jur River County major settlements:

- Achana Rocrocdong Payam
- Achot Rocrocdong Payam
- Akuoyo Kuajiena Payam
- Alel Thony Kangi Payam
- Atido Udici Payam
- Bar Chennee
- Bar Urud Kangi Payam
- Bar Yar
- Dankachak
- Dhekau
- Gette
- Kangi
- Kappara
- Kuajina
- Kuanyo
- Kyango
- Mbili
- Mapel
- Marial Bai
- Nyin Akok
- Udici
- Rocrocdong
- Tharkueng
- Wadhalelo
- Maleng
- Guarong
