= Raga County =

- County
- Raga County's Location (Highlighted in Red)
- Country: South Sudan
- Region: Bahr el Ghazal
- State: Western Bahr el Ghazal
- Named for: Raga (Town)
- Headquarters: Raga

Area
  - Total: 61,792.46 km^{2} (23,858.20 sq mi)

Population
  - Total: 77,203
- (2017 estimate)
- Time zone: UTC+2 (CAT)

Raga County is a county in Western Bahr el Ghazal state, in the Bahr el Ghazal region of South Sudan. It is the largest county in the nation. In Arabic, Raga County can be known as "Raja".

== Geography ==
Raga County is located in the northwestern part of South Sudan. It borders Sudan from north in Radom and Fifi in Hufrt-anahas (international border) in the south it has border with Wau state in Khor-Hajar, while in the east the official border is the Bora stream. In the west is bordering Republic Centre Africa, The total area is approximately 25.460 Kilometer squares.

Raga is one of the components of Bahr el Ghazal; it was a colonial province that covered the western Nile basin in the south of (Turco-Egyptian Sudan).

== Historical administrative points ==
At the start of 1956, Raga County was a full district, which was when the Republic of Sudan had gained its independence.

- 1983: In the period of President Nimeri Raga county (Mudriya) was established. It was when South Sudan was divided into three regions with the regional government in Juba.
- 1994: President Bashir divided Sudan into twenty six states (sixteen in the north and ten in south). Raga was a county under Western Bahr el-Ghazal state.
- 2015: Raga County was separated from Western Bahr el-Ghazal and two counties from Awiel was annexed to it to form what called Lol state, since then the situation remained stagnant.
- 2020: Raga County reverted back to Western Bahr el-Ghazal state.

== Ethnic groups ==
As of 2013, ethnic groups reported in Raga County were Balanda, Banda, Buja, Feroghe, Kara, Kresh, Shat, and Yulu.

Raga County is a home for Fertit ethnic groups namely:

- Niagugule, Indri, Togoyo, Forge, Bandalla (in the east, north, and centre)
- Zande, Balanda Viri, Chatt, Banda, Mangayat, Kresh-Uruo (in the south)
- Kresh, Yulu, Benga, Kara, Aja (in the west)

Each group from the above mentioned have different native tongues, but they live together throughout the history of this area.

== Population ==
Raga County's population is 54,340. It is the least populous county in Western Bahr el Ghazal.

== Towns and cities ==
- Raga
- Sopo
