= Western Bahr el Ghazal =

State of South Sudan

- State
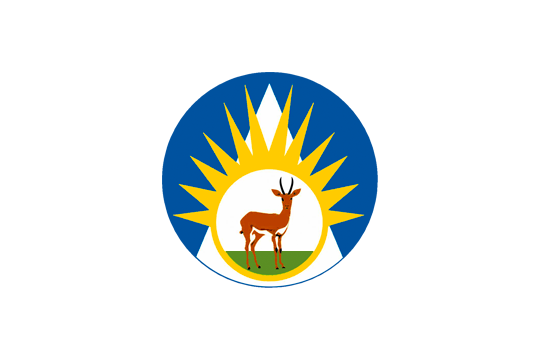
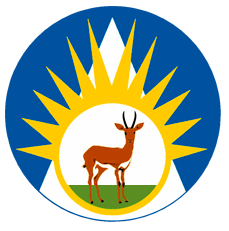
- Flag Seal

- Location in South Sudan.
- Coordinates: 07°53′N 25°52′E
- Country: South Sudan
- Region: Bahr el Ghazal
- Capital: Wau

Government
  - Governor: Sherif Daniel Sherif

Area
  - Total: 91,079.95 km^{2} (35,166.17 sq mi)

Population (2017 estimate)
  - Total: 473,636
  - Density: 5.20022/km^{2} (13.4685/sq mi)
- Time zone: UTC+2 (CAT)
- HDI (2021): 0.416 low · 4th of 10

Western Bahr el Ghazal is a state in South Sudan. It has an area of 93,900 km^{2} (36,255 sq mi) and as of 2020 has estimated 600,000 in population. It is part of the Bahr el Ghazal region. Its capital is Wau. The state shared international borders with Sudan to the north and the Central African Republic to the west. The portion now occupied by Raga County (pronounced 'Raja') is the southern part of the historical region known as "Dar Fertit".

== History ==
This state, and Raga County in particular, was the part of South Sudan that was most affected by the slave trade conducted by nearby Muslim sultanates from the 18th century on and by Mameluk Egypt in the second half of the 19th century, and Raga County is the only part of South Sudan with a significant number of Muslims and Arabs. In addition to the Baggara Arabs, another local Muslim ethnic group is the Feroghe (Feroge, etc.). Traditionally, the northern part of Raga County falls within the "Baggara belt", the 1400 kilometer wide section of the central Sahel in which cattle herding Arabic speaking tribes conduct seasonal nomadic migrations. When the slave trade soared in the 1860s and 1870s, the region's population shrank dramatically, plunging by 75 percent to about 400,000. Depopulation was due to several factors all related to wars that were provoked by the upsurge in slaving promoted by Egypt, factors including: actual capture of inhabitants, emigration of refugees, and epidemics. The population according to the 2008 census was lower still. This may have been partly due to the second Sudanese civil war, 1983-1999, which devastated most of South Sudan, exacting a toll of two million dead civilians and hundreds of thousands of refugees.

During the Sudanese era power was controlled mainly by the Feroghe, including the NIF stalwart Ali Tamim Fartak, who ruled Western Bahr al-Ghazal from 1992 or 1993 until 1997. He later served as governor of South Darfur, as Minister of Electricity and as Minister of Education. Fartak currently leads the Islamic Movement for the Liberation of Raja.

In October 2015, Western Bahr el Ghazal was split into two new states, Lol State and Wau State, following an act by President Salva Kiir to establish 32 new states of South Sudan.

Following a peace agreement at the conclusion of the South Sudanese Civil War in 2020, Western Bahr el Ghazal was reestablished along with the rest of the original ten states of South Sudan. Kiir appointed Sarah Cleto Hassan as governor, and the only woman to be appointed of eight governors.

== Geography ==
Western Bahr el Ghazal is situated in South Sudan's Bahr el Ghazal region, bordering Northern Bahr el Ghazal and Warrap to the west and Western Equatoria to the south. To the north it shares a border with the states of South Darfur and East Darfur in Sudan. To the west it shares a border with Haute-Kotto and Haut-Mbomou in the Central African Republic. It claims Kafia Kingi, though this is disputed by the government of Sudan, which asserts the area is a part of South Darfur. The Lol River crosses through the state.

== Demographics ==
Local ethnic groups included the Luo, and Balanda Boor, Balanda Viri, Balanda Uoyu Juku (Balanda Viri, Balanda Bagari) (Balanda are one people settling in different locations hence Dem Zubier, Bagari, Bazia and Tambura are geographical names not tribal. They were found in both western Equatoria and Western Bahar El Ghazal states), Luo, Ndogo, Kresh, Bai, Baggara Arabs, and many others. Despite the common element "Balanda" in their names, the first two ethnicities are not related. Despite frequent mentions of the existence of a "Fertit people" in Western Bahr el Ghazal, there is no such people.

== Administration ==
The Governor of Western Bahr el Ghazal serves as the state's chief executive. As of 2024, Emmanuel Parimo Okello is the incumbent governor, replacing Sarah Cleto Hassan. Okello was replaced by Sherif Daniel Sherif on 3 September 2025. As of 2010, the ministers of various departments included the following:

- Morris Yel Akol, Minister of Finance
- Wol Akec Akol, Minister of Agriculture
- John Peter Miskin, Minister of Legal Affairs
- Efisio Kon Uguak, Minister of Administration

=== Counties ===
Western Bahr el Ghazal is divided into three counties.

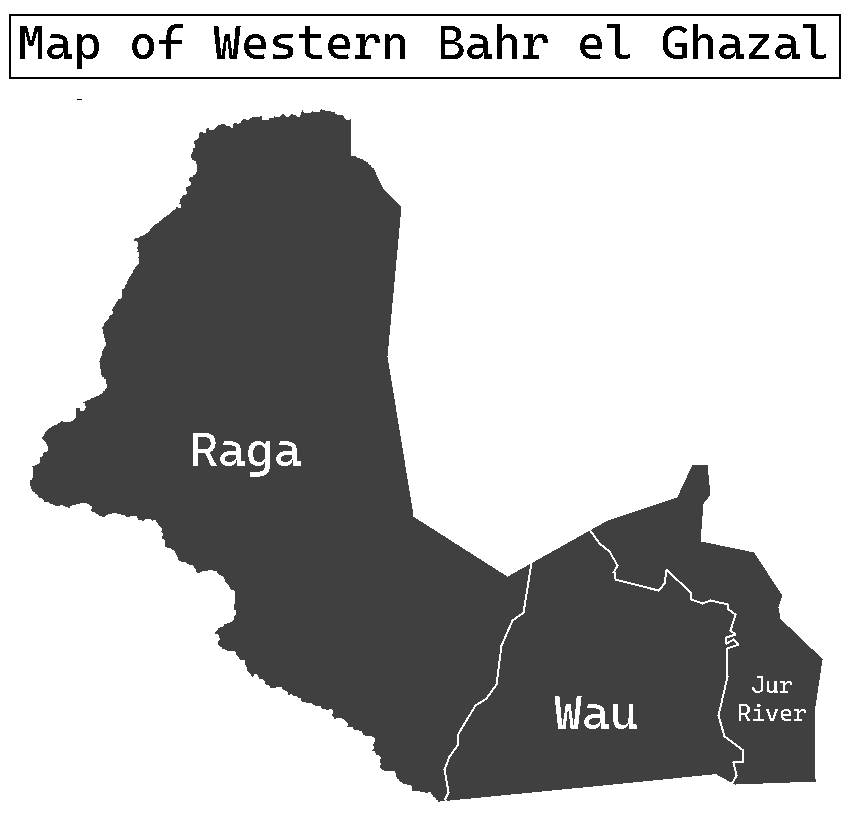
County map of Western Bahr el Ghazal

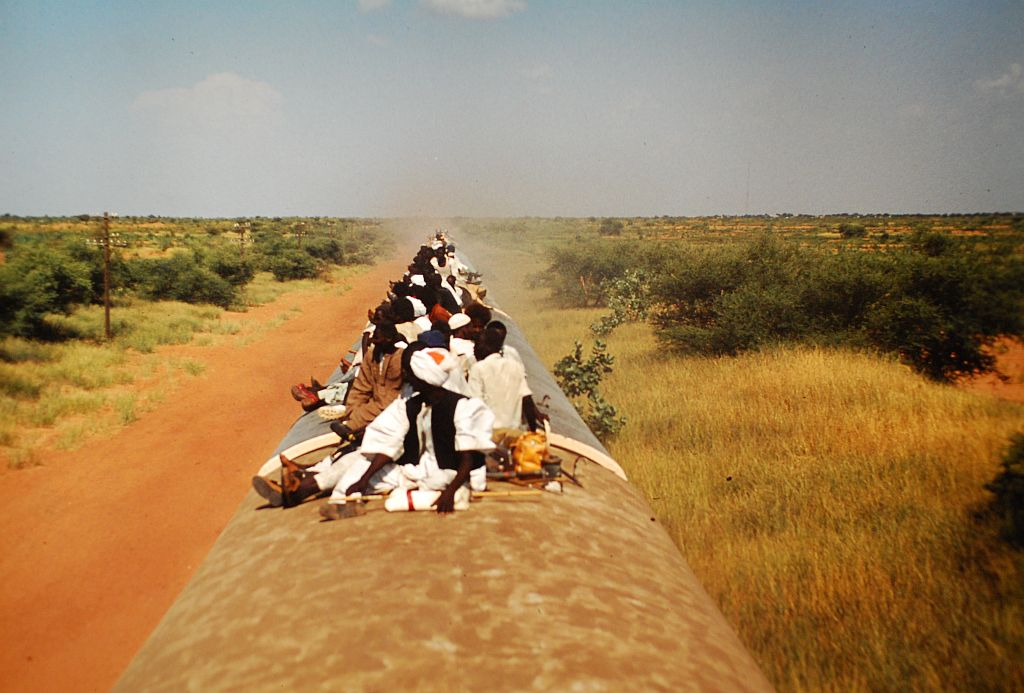
Train in Western Bahr el Ghazal

County	Area (km^{2})	Population Census 2008
Jur River	10,032.22	127,771
Raga	61,792.46	54,340
Wau	19,251.27	151,320

The counties are further divided into Payams, then Bomas. South Sudan claims Kafia Kingi as part of Western Bahr el Ghazal, though Sudan disputes it as a part of South Darfur.

== Main cities and towns ==
- Wau is the capital city of the state.
- Raga is located in the western part of the state.
- Acongeong is located northeast of Wau.
- Deim Zubeir is located in the central part of the state.
- Mapel is located in the eastern Wau
- Udici is located in the north-west of Wau
- Kuajiena Jur River County
- Kangi Jur River County
- Boro Madina Raga County
- Bussery Wau County
- Marial Bai Jur River County

== Notes ==
- Cordell, Dennis (1983). "The savanna belt". In Birmingham, David; Martin, Phyllis M. (eds.). History of Central Africa. Vol. 1. Longman.
- Thomas, Edward. 2010. The Kafia Kingi enclave. London and Nairobi: Rift Valley Institute.
