= Ngbaka =

The name Ngbaka is used for several Ubangian peoples and their languages, such as:

- Ngbaka Gbaya language
- M'Baka people and Mbaka language
- Ngbaka languages
