= Central Africa =

Core region of the African continent

- Central Africa
- Countries: Sovereign states (9): Angola; Cameroon; Central African Republic; Chad; Democratic Republic of the Congo; Equatorial Guinea; Gabon; Republic of the Congo; São Tomé and Príncipe
- Time zones: UTC+01:00; UTC+02:00

Regions of the African Union: Northern Western Southern Eastern Central Note that Ceuta and Melilla in Northern Africa are parts of Spain.

This video over Central Africa and the Middle East was taken by the crew of Expedition 29 onboard the International Space Station in October 2011.

Central Africa (French: Afrique centrale; Spanish: África central; Portuguese: África Central) is a subregion of the African continent comprising various countries according to different definitions. Middle Africa is an analogous term used by the United Nations in its geoscheme for Africa and consists of the following countries: Angola, Cameroon, Central African Republic, Chad, Democratic Republic of the Congo, Equatorial Guinea, Gabon, Republic of the Congo, and São Tomé and Príncipe. The United Nations Office for Central Africa also covers Burundi and Rwanda, although both are classified under East Africa in the geoscheme. These eleven countries are or were members of the Economic Community of Central African States (ECCAS). Six of those countries (Cameroon, Central African Republic, Chad, Equatorial Guinea, Gabon, and Republic of the Congo) are also members of the Economic and Monetary Community of Central Africa (CEMAC) and share a common currency, the Central African CFA franc.

ECCAS/CEMAC state, part of Middle Africa ECCAS state, part of Middle Africa ECCAS state only

The African Development Bank, on the other hand, defines Central Africa as seven countries: Cameroon, Central African Republic, Chad, Republic of the Congo, Democratic Republic of Congo, Equatorial Guinea, and Gabon.

== List of Central African countries as per the UN Geoscheme ==
- Angola
- Cameroon
- Central African Republic
- Chad
- Congo
- Democratic Republic of the Congo
- Equatorial Guinea
- Gabon
- São Tomé and Príncipe

== Background ==
Membership of ECCAS

The Central African Federation (1953–1963), also called the Federation of Rhodesia and Nyasaland, was made up of what are now the nations of Malawi, Zambia, and Zimbabwe. Similarly, the Anglican Church of the Province of Central Africa covers dioceses in Botswana, Malawi, Zambia, and Zimbabwe, while the Church of Central Africa, Presbyterian has synods in Malawi, Zambia, and Zimbabwe. These states are now typically considered part of East or Southern Africa.

== Geography ==
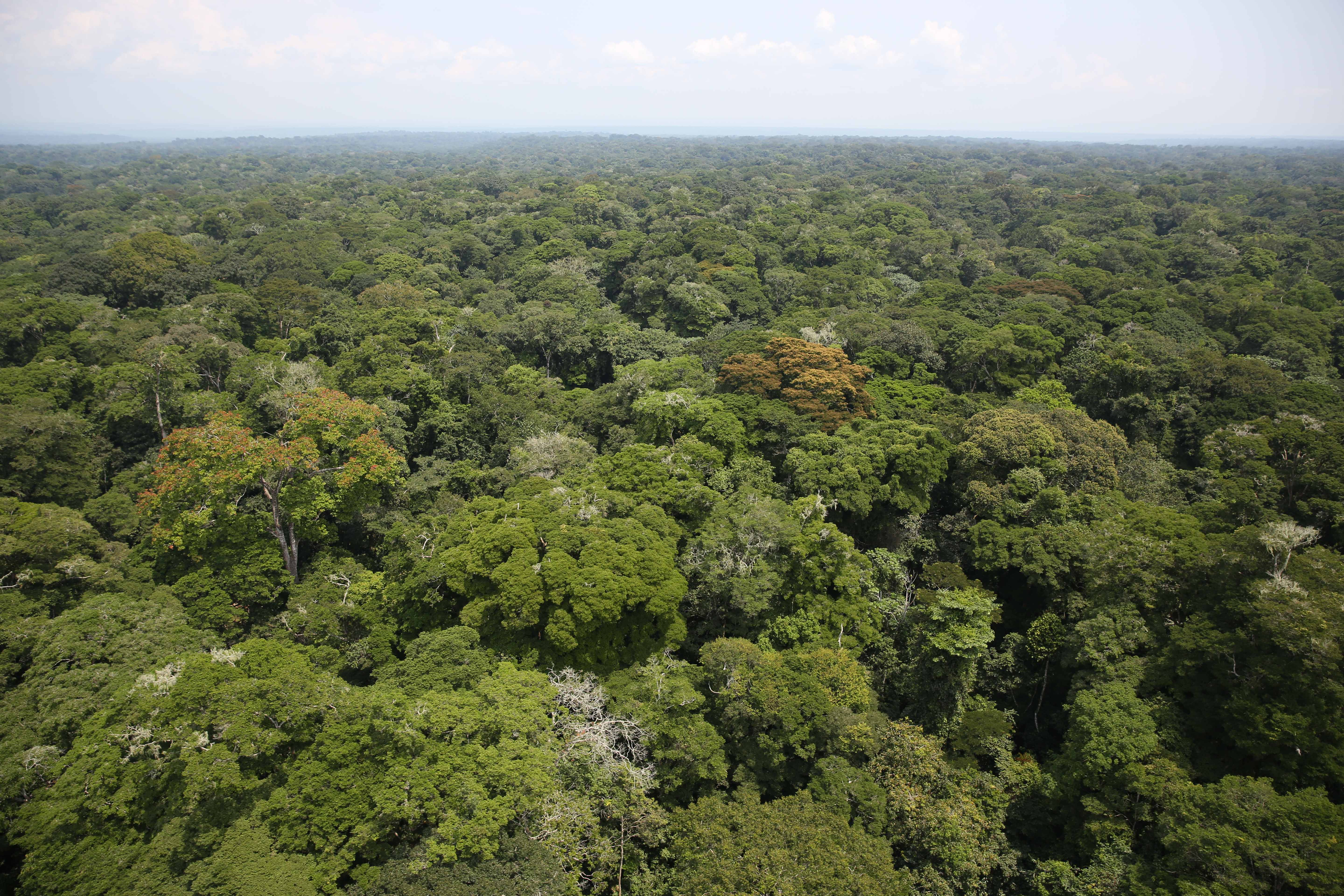
Ituri Rainforest in the Congo Basin

The Congo River basin has historically been ecologically significant to the populations of Central Africa, serving as an important supra-regional organization in Central Africa.

== History ==
=== Prehistory ===
Archeological finds in Central Africa have been made which date back over 100,000 years. According to Zagato and Holl, there is evidence of iron smelting in the Central African Republic that may date back to 3000 to 2500 BCE. Extensive walled settlements have recently been found in Northeast Nigeria, approximately 60 km (37 mi) southwest of Lake Chad dating to the first millennium BCE.

Trade and improved agricultural techniques supported more sophisticated societies, leading to the early civilizations of West Africa: Sao, Kanem, Bornu, Shilluk, Baguirmi, and Wadai.

Around 2500 BCE, Bantu migrants had reached the Great Lakes Region in Central Africa. Halfway through the first millennium BCE, the Bantu had also settled as far south as what is now Angola.

=== Ancient history ===
==== Sao civilization ====
The West African Sao civilization flourished from ca. the 6th century BCE to as late as the 16th century CE in northern Central Africa. The Sao lived by the Chari River south of Lake Chad in territory that later became part of Cameroon and Chad. They are the earliest people to have left clear traces of their presence in the territory of modern Cameroon. Today, several ethnic groups of northern Cameroon and southern Chad but particularly the Sara people claim descent from the civilization of the Sao. Sao artifacts show that they were skilled workers in bronze, copper, and iron. Finds include bronze sculptures and terra cotta statues of human and animal figures, coins, funerary urns, household utensils, jewelry, highly decorated pottery, and spears. The largest Sao archaeological finds have been made south of Lake Chad.

=== Kanem Empire ===
The Kanem and Bornu Empires in 1810

The West-Central African kingdom of Kanem–Bornu Empire was centered in the Lake Chad Basin. It was known as the Kanem Empire from the 9th century CE onward and lasted as the independent kingdom of Bornu until 1900. At its height it encompassed an area covering not only much of Chad, but also parts of modern eastern Niger, northeastern Nigeria, northern Cameroon and parts of South Sudan. The history of the Empire is mainly known from the Royal Chronicle or Girgam discovered in 1851 by the German traveler Heinrich Barth. Kanem rose in the 8th century in the region to the north and east of Lake Chad. The Kanem empire went into decline, shrank, and in the 14th century was defeated by Bilala invaders from the Lake Fitri region.

=== Bornu Empire ===
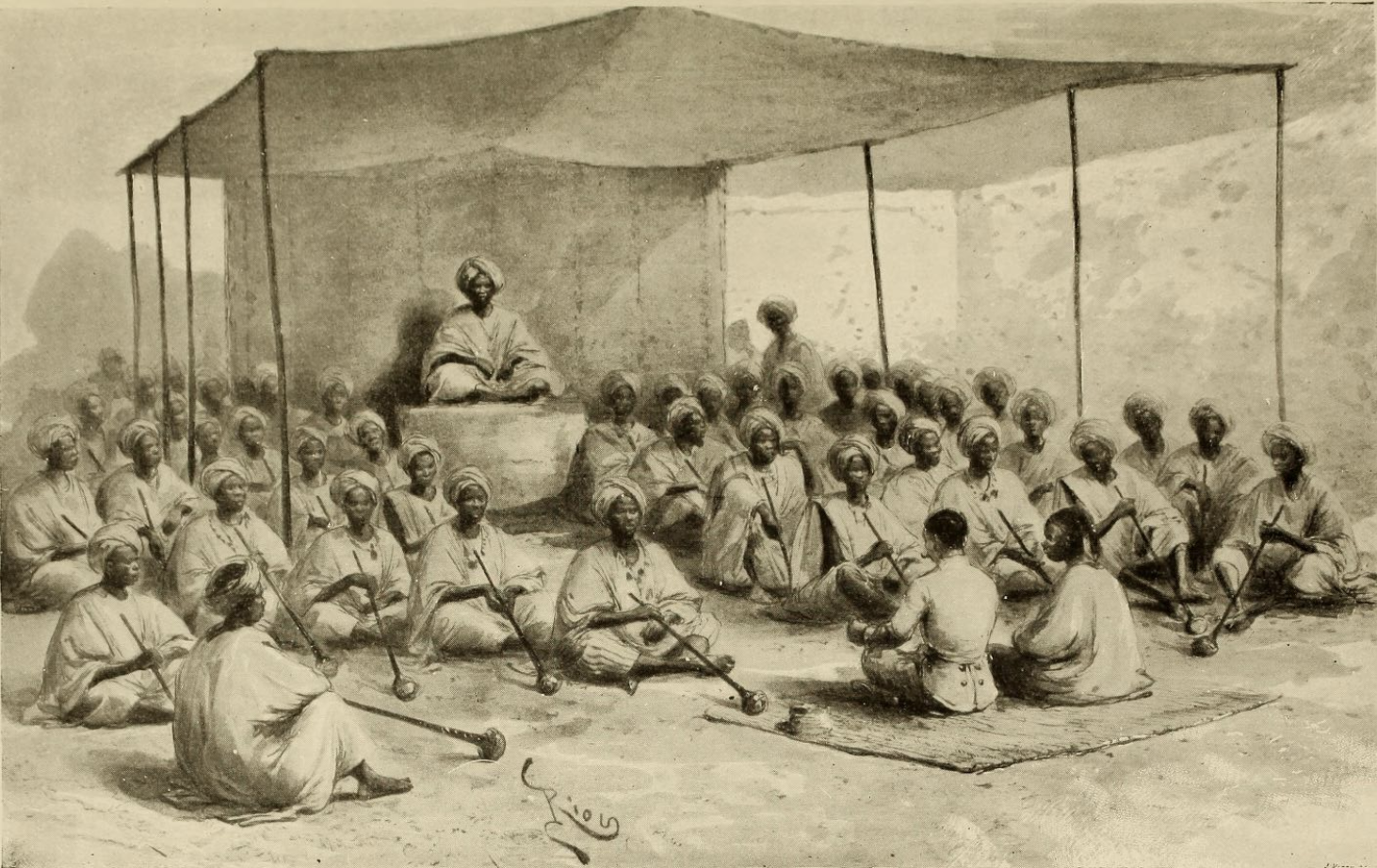
Galadima of Bornu receiving French officer Parfait-Louis Monteil, 1891

The Kanuri people of West Africa led by the Sayfuwa migrated to the west and south of the lake, where they established the Bornu Empire. By the late 16th century the Bornu empire had expanded and recaptured the parts of Kanem that had been conquered by the Bulala. Satellite states of Bornu included the Damagaram in the west and Baguirmi to the southeast of Lake Chad.

=== Shilluk Kingdom ===
The Shilluk Kingdom was centered in South Sudan from the 15th century from along a strip of land along the western bank of White Nile, from Lake No to about 12° north latitude. The capital and royal residence were in the town of Fashoda. The kingdom was founded during the mid-15th century CE by its first ruler, Nyikang. During the 19th century, the Shilluk Kingdom faced decline following military assaults from the Ottoman Empire and later British and Sudanese colonization in Anglo-Egyptian Sudan.

=== Baguirmi Kingdom ===
The Kingdom of Baguirmi existed as an independent state during the 16th and 17th centuries southeast of West-Central Africa Lake Chad region in what is now the country of Chad. Baguirmi emerged to the southeast of the Kanem–Bornu Empire. The kingdom's first ruler was Mbang Birni Besse. Later in his reign, the Bornu Empire conquered and made the state a tributary.

=== Wadai Empire ===
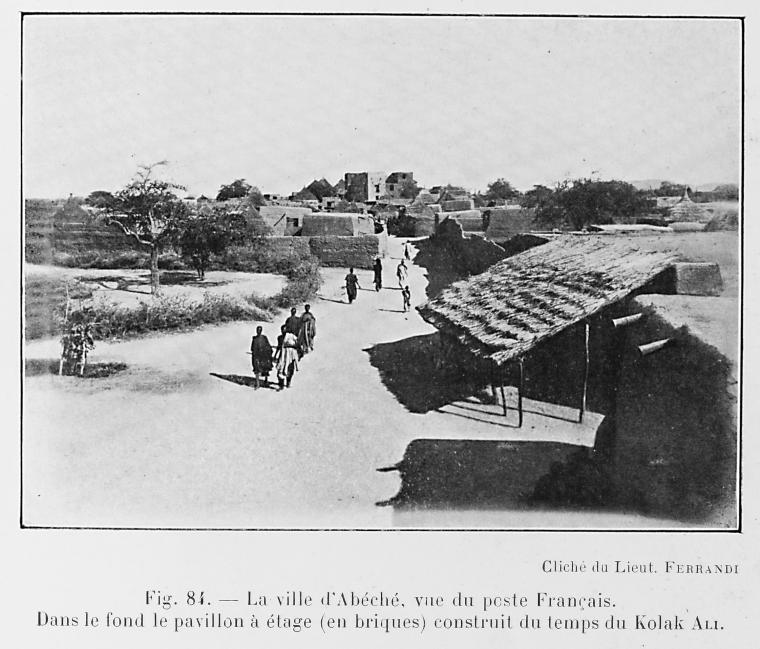
Abéché, capital of Wadai, in 1918 after the French had taken over

The Wadai Empire was centered in Chad from the 17th century. The Tunjur people founded the Wadai Kingdom to the east of Bornu in the 16th century. In the 17th century, there was a revolt of the Maba people who established a Muslim dynasty. At first, Wadai paid tribute to Bornu and Durfur, but by the 18th century, Wadai was fully independent and had become an aggressor against its neighbors.

=== Lunda Empire ===
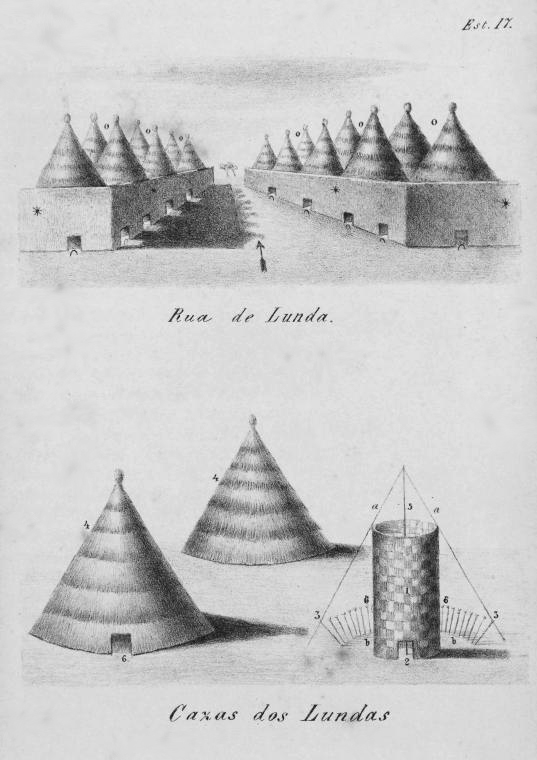
Lunda town and dwelling

Following the Bantu Migration from Western Africa, Bantu kingdoms and empires began to develop in southern Central Africa. In the 1450s, a Luba from the royal family Ilunga Tshibinda married Lunda queen Rweej and united all Lunda peoples. Their son Mulopwe Luseeng expanded the kingdom. His son Naweej expanded the empire further and is known as the first Lunda emperor, with the title Mwata Yamvo (mwaant yaav, mwant yav), the "Lord of Vipers". The Luba political system was retained, and conquered peoples were integrated into the system. The mwata yamvo assigned a cilool or kilolo (royal adviser) and tax collector to each state conquered.

Numerous states claimed descent from the Lunda. The Imbangala of inland Angola claimed descent from a founder, Kinguri, brother of Queen Rweej, who could not tolerate the rule of mulopwe Tshibunda. Kinguri became the title of kings of states founded by Queen Rweej's brother. The Luena (Lwena) and Lozi (Luyani) in Zambia also claim descent from Kinguri. During the 17th century, a Lunda chief and warrior called Mwata Kazembe set up an Eastern Lunda kingdom in the valley of the Luapula River. The Lunda's western expansion also saw claims of descent by the Yaka and the Pende. The Lunda linked Central Africa with the western coast trade. The kingdom of Lunda came to an end in the 19th century when it was invaded by the Chokwe, who were armed with guns.

=== Kongo Kingdom ===
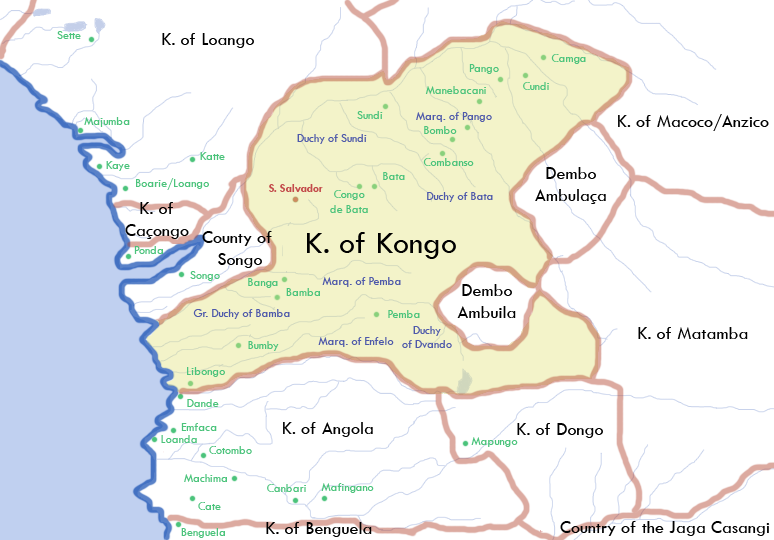
Kongo in 1711

By the 15th century CE, the farming Bakongo people (ba being the plural prefix) were unified as the Kingdom of Kongo under a ruler called the manikongo, residing in the fertile Pool Malebo area on the lower Congo River. The capital was M'banza-Kongo. With superior organization, they were able to conquer their neighbors and extract tribute. They were experts in metalwork, pottery, and weaving raffia cloth. They stimulated interregional trade via a tribute system controlled by the manikongo. Later, maize (corn) and cassava (manioc) would be introduced to the region via trade with the Portuguese at their ports at Luanda and Benguela. The maize and cassava would result in population growth in the region and other parts of Africa, replacing millet as the main staple.

By the 16th century, the manikongo held authority from the Atlantic in the west to the Kwango River in the east. Each territory was assigned a mani-mpembe (provincial governor) by the manikongo. In 1506, Afonso I (1506–1542), a Christian, took over the throne. Slave trading increased with Afonso's wars of conquest. About 1568 to 1569, the Jaga invaded Kongo, laying waste to the kingdom and forcing the manikongo into exile. In 1574, Manikongo Álvaro I was reinstated with the help of Portuguese mercenaries. During the latter part of the 1660s, the Portuguese tried to gain control of Kongo. Manikongo António I (1661–1665), with a Kongolese army of 5,000, was destroyed by an army of Afro-Portuguese at the Battle of Mbwila. The empire dissolved into petty polities, fighting among each other for war captives to sell into slavery.

Kongo gained captives from the Kingdom of Ndongo in wars of conquest. Ndongo was ruled by the ngola. Ndongo would also engage in slave trading with the Portuguese, with São Tomé being a transit point to Brazil. The kingdom was not as welcoming as Kongo; it viewed the Portuguese with great suspicion and as an enemy. The Portuguese in the latter part of the 16th century tried to gain control of Ndongo but were defeated by the Mbundu. Ndongo experienced depopulation from slave raiding. The leaders established another state at Matamba, affiliated with Queen Nzinga, who put up a strong resistance to the Portuguese until coming to terms with them. The Portuguese settled along the coast as trade dealers, not venturing on conquest of the interior. Slavery wreaked havoc in the interior, with states initiating wars of conquest for captives. The Imbangala formed the slave-raiding state of Kasanje, a major source of slaves during the 17th and 18th centuries.

=== Modern history ===
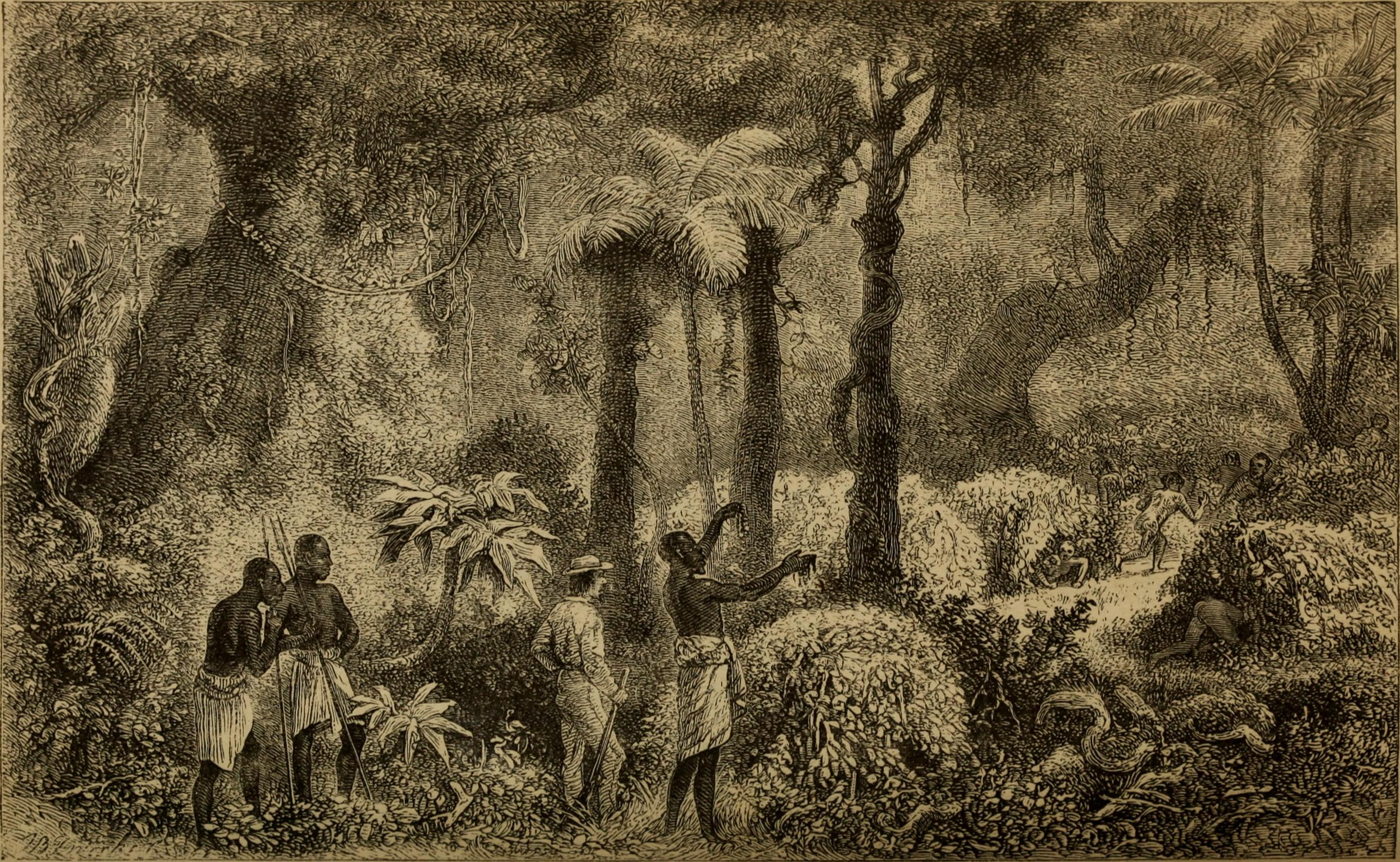
French explorer Paul Du Chaillu confirmed the existence of Pygmy peoples of central Africa.

During the Conference of Berlin in 1884–85 Africa was divided up between the European colonial powers, defining boundaries that are largely intact with today's post-colonial states. On 5 August 1890 the British and French concluded an agreement to clarify the boundary between French West Africa and what would become Nigeria. A boundary was agreed along a line from Say on the Niger to Barruwa on Lake Chad, but leaving the Sokoto Caliphate in the British sphere. Parfait-Louis Monteil was given charge of an expedition to discover where this line actually ran. On 9 April 1892 he reached Kukawa on the shore of the lake. Over the next twenty years a large part of the Chad Basin was incorporated by treaty or by force into French West Africa. On 2 June 1909, the Wadai capital of Abéché was occupied by the French. The remainder of the basin was divided by the British in Nigeria, who took Kano in 1903, and the Germans in Cameroon.

The countries of the basin regained their independence between 1956 and 1962, retaining the colonial administrative boundaries. Chad, Gabon, the Republic of the Congo, and the Central African Republic became autonomous states with the dissolution of French Equatorial Africa in 1958, gaining full independence in 1960. The Democratic Republic of the Congo also gained independence from Belgium in 1960, but quickly devolved into a period of political upheaval and conflict known as the Congo Crisis (1960–1965) which ended with the installment of Joseph Mobutu as president and renamed the country Zaire in 1971. Equatorial Guinea gained independence from Spain in 1968, leading to the election of Francisco Macías Nguema, now widely regarded as one of the most brutal dictators in history. In 1961, Angola became involved in the Portuguese Colonial War, a 13-year-long struggle for independence in Lusophone Africa. It gained independence only in 1975, following the 1974 Carnation Revolution in Lisbon. São Tomé and Príncipe also gained independence in 1975 in the aftermath of the Carnation Revolution. In 2011, South Sudan gained its independence from the Republic of Sudan after over 50 years of war.

In the 21st century, many jihadist and Islamist groups began to operate in the Central African region, including the Seleka and the Ansaru.

Over the course of the 2010s, the internationally unrecognized secessionist state called Ambazonia gained increasing momentum in its home regions, resulting in the ongoing Anglophone Crisis in Cameroon.

== Economy ==
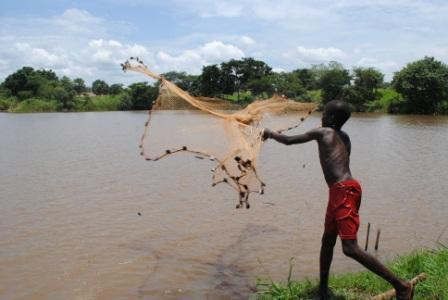
Fishing in Central Africa

The main economic activities of Central Africa are farming, herding and fishing. At least 40% of the rural population of northern and eastern Central Africa lives in poverty and routinely face chronic food shortages. Crop production based on rain is possible only in the southern belt. Slash-and-burn agriculture is a common practice. Flood recession agriculture is practiced around Lake Chad and in the riverine wetlands. Nomadic herders migrate with their animals into the grasslands of the northern part of the basin for a few weeks during each short rainy season, where they intensively graze the highly nutritious grasses. When the dry season starts they move back south, either to grazing lands around the lakes and floodplains, or to the savannas further to the south.

In the 2000–01 period, fisheries in the Lake Chad basin provided food and income to more than 10 million people, with a harvest of about 70,000 tons. Fisheries have traditionally been managed by a system where each village has recognized rights over a defined part of the river, wetland or lake, and fishers from elsewhere must seek permission and pay a fee to use this area. The governments only enforced rules and regulations to a limited extent. Local governments and traditional authorities are increasingly engaged in rent-seeking, collecting license fees with the help of the police or army.

Oil is also a major export of the countries of northern and eastern Central Africa, notably making up a large proportion of the GDPs of Chad and South Sudan.

== Demographics ==
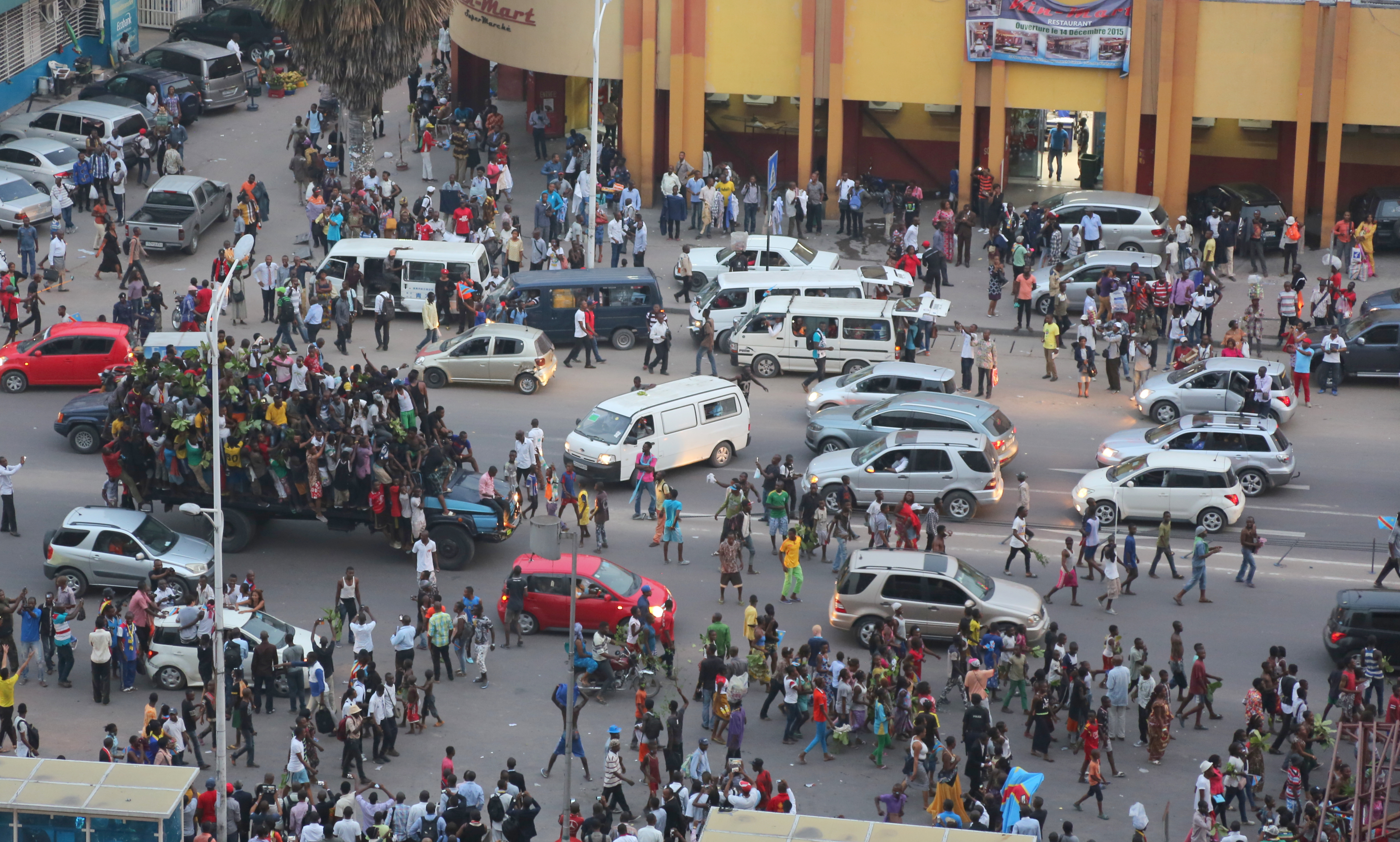
Kinshasa is a megacity with more than 15 million inhabitants.

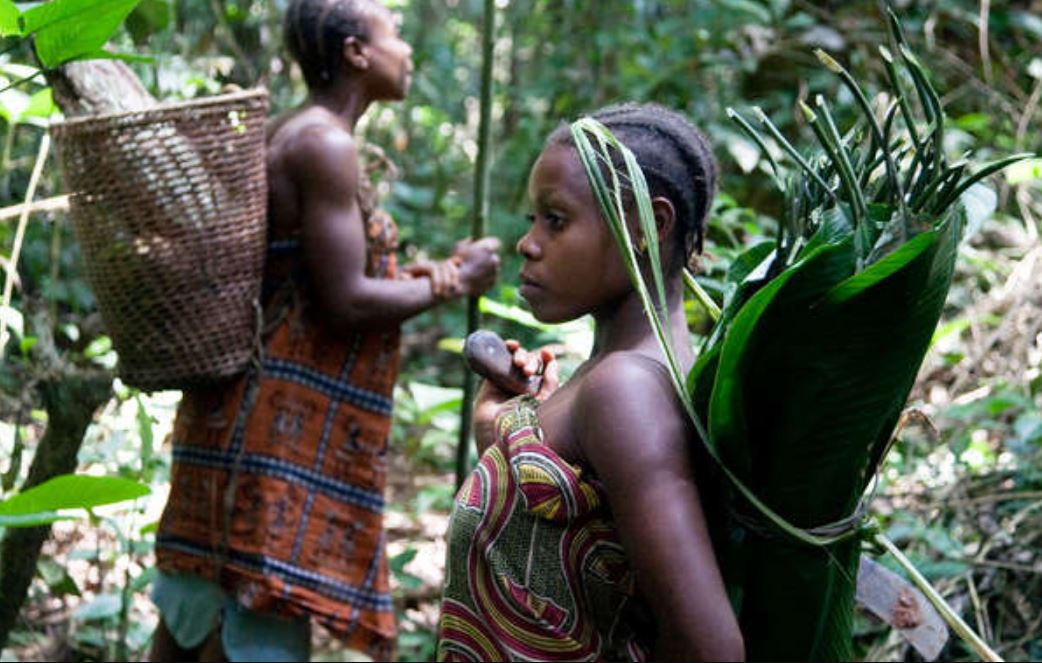
Pygmy hunter-gatherers in the Congo Basin

Following the Bantu Migration, Central Africa is primarily inhabited by Native African or Bantu peoples and Bantu languages predominate. These include the Mongo, Kongo and Luba peoples. Central Africa also includes many Nilo-Saharan and Niger-Congo Ubangian communities: in north western Central Africa the Nilo-Saharan Kanuri predominate. Most of the Ubangian speakers in Africa (often grouped with Niger-Congo) are also found in Central Africa, such as the Gbaya, Banda and Zande, in northern Central Africa.

Notable Central African supra-regional organizations include the Lake Chad Basin Commission and the Economic Community of Central African States.

The predominant religions of Central Africa are Christianity and traditional faiths. Chad is the only country in the region where Islam in the majority religion. Islam is also common in Cameroon, being practiced by about 30% of the population. Smaller Muslim communities exist in the other countries too.

Name	Capital	Currency	Official languages	Area (km^{2})	Population (2021)
Angola	Luanda	Kwanza	Portuguese	1,246,700	34,503,774
Cameroon	Yaoundé	Central African CFA franc	French, English	475,442	27,198,628
Central African Republic	Bangui	Central African CFA franc	Sango, French	622,984	5,457,154
Chad	N'Djamena	Central African CFA franc	French, Arabic	1,284,000	17,179,740
Democratic Republic of the Congo	Kinshasa	Congolese franc	French	2,344,858	95,894,118
Republic of the Congo	Brazzaville	Central African CFA franc	French	342,000	5,835,806
Equatorial Guinea	Malabo	Central African CFA franc	Spanish, Portuguese, French	28,051	1,634,466
Gabon	Libreville	Central African CFA franc	French	267,668	2,341,179
São Tomé and Príncipe	São Tomé	São Tomé and Príncipe Dobra	Portuguese	964	223,107

Due to common historical processes and widespread demographic movements between the countries of Central Africa before the Bantu Migration into much of southern Central Africa, the cultures of the region evidence many similarities and interrelationships. Similar cultural practices stemming from common origins as largely Nilo-Saharan or Bantu peoples are also evident in Central Africa including in music, dance, art, body adornment, initiation, and marriage rituals.

Some major Native African ethnic groups in Central Africa are as follows:

Name	Family	Language	Region	Country	Population (million)	Notes
Sara	Nilo-Saharan, Central Sudanic	Sara	Chad Basin	Chad, Cameroon, Central African Republic	3.5	
Gbaya	Niger-Congo, Ubangian	Gbaya language	Chad Basin	Central African Republic	1.5	
Zande	Niger–Congo, Ubangian	Zande	Chad Basin	South Sudan, Central African Republic, Democratic Republic of Congo	1–4	
Kanuri	Nilo-Saharan, Western Saharan	Kanuri	Chad Basin	Eastern Nigeria, Niger, Cameroon, Chad	10	
Banda	Niger-Congo, Ubangian	Banda language	Chad Basin	Central African Republic	1.5	
Luba	Niger-Congo, Bantu	Luba language	Sub-Equatorial	Democratic Republic of Congo	10–15	
Mongo	Niger-Congo, Bantu	Mongo language	Sub-Equatorial	Democratic Republic of Congo	10–15	
Kongo	Niger-Congo, Bantu	Kongo language	Sub-Equatorial	Democratic Republic of Congo, Angola, Republic of Congo	10	

== Culture ==
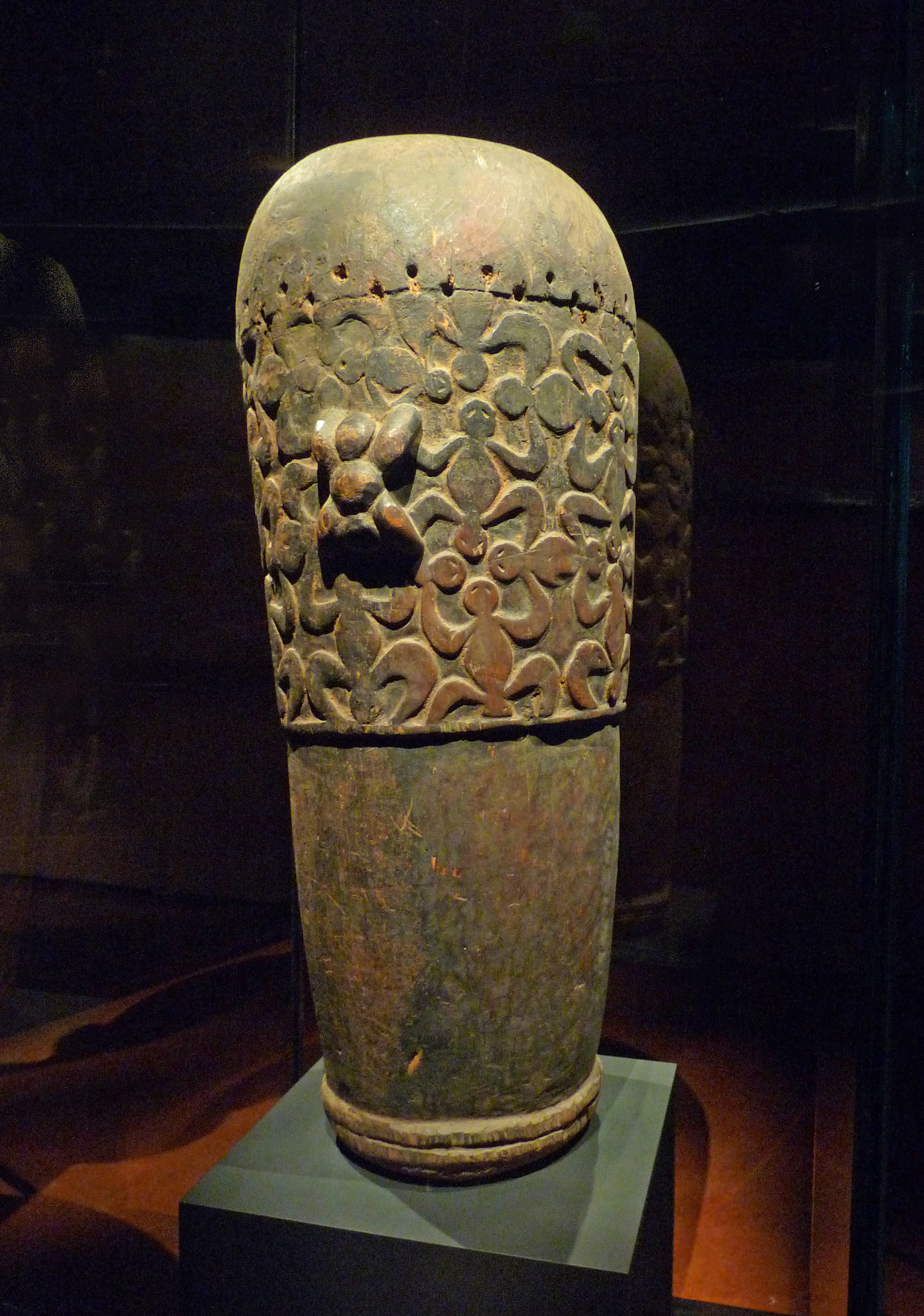
Art from Cameroon

== Architecture ==
Further information in the sections of Architecture of Africa:

- Ancient Central African Architecture
- Medieval Central African Architecture

== Science and technology ==
Further information in the sections of History of science and technology in Africa:

- Mathematics
- Textiles
- Communication systems
- By country

== See also ==
- British Central Africa Protectorate (1891–1907, now Malawi)
- Central African Federation (1953–1963, now Malawi, Zambia and Zimbabwe)
- French Equatorial Africa
- Mittelafrika
- Royal Museum for Central Africa (Brussels, Belgium)
