= Barambu people =

Ethnic group in the Democratic Republic of the Congo

Barambu
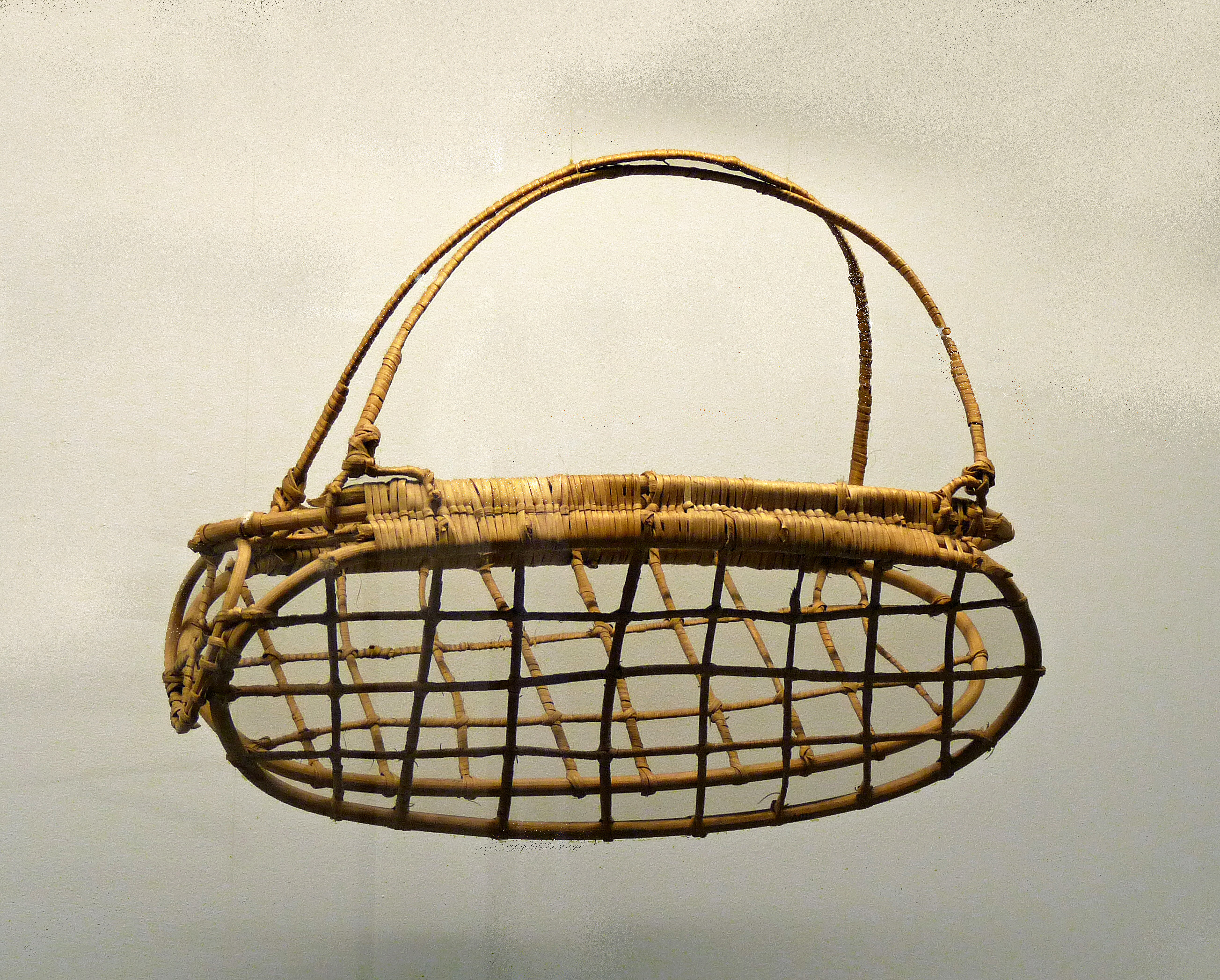
- Barambu basket for chickens, Musée royal de l'Afrique centrale

Regions with significant populations
- Democratic Republic of the Congo, Bas-Uélé province: 61,000

Languages
- Barambu, French

Religion
- predominantly Christianity

The Barambu (or Barambo) are an ethnic group who live in the northeast of the Democratic Republic of the Congo.

== Population ==
The Joshua Project as of 2020 gave the population as 61,000 located in the Poko territory of Bas-Uélé province, between the Bomokandi and Uélé rivers. They were almost all Christian, broken down as Roman Catholic 41%, Protestant 28%, Other Christian 19% and Independent 12%.

== Origins ==
The Italian explorer Giovanni Miani, who visited the Uele region in 1872, was the first European to mention the Barambu people. A 1948 account by S. Santandrea summarized what was then known of the Barambo and other peoples of the Bahr el Ghazal basin. The Zande call them Amiangba or Amiangbwa, but this may also cover the Pambia. The Barambu appeared to have been a large tribe that crossed the Mbomou River before the Zande people and mostly settled along the Uele River, although some stragglers ended up on the upper Api River. After the "Sudanese" sections of the tribe crossed the Congo-Nile Divide they settled between the Mongu and Ringasi rivers. In 1948 about 2,900 tax payers of the tribe inhabited the country between the hills near Tombora and the Boku River in the French Congo.

== Language ==
The name Barambu or Barambo means in their language "man", and is similar to bambu, which means "man" in the related Pambia language. According to Glottolog, the Barambu language as of 2017 had AES status "threatened" and may be classified as:

- Atlantic-Congo
  - Volta-Congo
    - North Volta-Congo
      - Cameroun-Ubangian
        - Ubangian
          - Zandic
            - Barambo-Pambia
              - Barambu

== Sources ==
- "Barambu, Amiangba in Congo, Democratic Republic of", Joshua Project
- Hammarström, Harald; Forkel, Robert; Haspelmath, Martin; Bank, Sebastian, "Spoken L1 Language: Barambu", Glottolog 4.3
- Omasombo Tshonda, Jean (2011), Haut-Uele : Trésor (PDF) (in French), Musée royal de l'Afrique centrale, ISBN 978-2-8710-6578-4
- Santandrea, S. (1948), "Little known tribes of the Bahr el Ghazal basin", Sudan Notes and Records, 29 (1), University of Khartoum: 78–106, JSTOR 41716540
