= Ubangian languages =

Language family mainly of the Central African Republic

Ubangian
- Geographic distribution: Central African Republic, Cameroon, Gabon, Republic of the Congo, Democratic Republic of the Congo, and South Sudan
- Linguistic classification: Niger–Congo?: Atlantic–Congo; Volta–Congo; Savanna?; Ubangian
- Subdivisions: Banda; Ngbandi; Zande; Sere; Ngbaka; Mba; Gbaya?

Language codes
- Glottolog: uban1244 (Ubangian + Zande)

The Ubangian languages form a diverse linkage of some seventy languages centered on the Central African Republic and the Democratic Republic of the Congo. They are the predominant languages of the CAR, spoken by 2–3 million people, including one of its official languages, Sango. They are also spoken in Cameroon, Chad, the Republic of Congo, and South Sudan.

== External classification ==
Joseph Greenberg (1963) classified the then-little-known Ubangian languages as Niger–Congo and placed them within the Adamawa languages as "Eastern Adamawa". They were soon removed to a separate branch of Niger–Congo, for example within Blench's Savanna languages. However, this has become increasingly uncertain, and Dimmendaal (2008) states that, based on the lack of convincing evidence for a Niger–Congo classification ever being produced, Ubangian "probably constitutes an independent language family that cannot or can no longer be shown to be related to Niger–Congo (or any other family)." Blench (2012) includes Ubangian within Niger–Congo. Güldemann (2018) notes that although evidence for the inclusion of Ubangi within Niger-Congo is still weak, the same also applies to many other branches which are uncontested members of Niger-Congo.

== Internal classification ==
Boyd and Moñino (2010) removed the Gbaya and Zande languages. The half dozen remaining branches are coherent, but their interrelationships are not straightforward. Williamson & Blench (2000) propose the following arrangement:

- Ubangian
  - Banda
  - Ngbandi (Sango, with 2 million speakers total, is Ngbandi-based)
  - Sere–Mba
    - Sere
    - Ngbaka–Mba
      - Ngbaka (note the principal Gbaya language is also called Ngbaka)
      - Mba

In addition, there is the Ngombe language, whose placement is uncertain due to a paucity of data.

Note: The ambiguous name Ngbaka is used for various languages in the area. Generally, singular Ngbaka language refers to one of the main Gbaya languages, whereas plural Ngbaka languages refers to a branch of Ubangian.

=== Güldemann (2018) ===
Güldemann (2018) recognises seven coherent "genealogical units" within Ubangian, but is agnostic about their positions within Niger–Congo.

- Gbayaic
- Zandic
- Mbaic
- Mundu-Baka
- Ngbandic
- Bandaic
- Ndogoic

== Comparative vocabulary ==
Sample basic vocabulary of Ubangian languages from Moñino (1988):

Classification	Language	eye	ear	nose	tooth	tongue	mouth	blood	bone	water	tree	eat	name
Gbaya	Proto-Gbaya	*gbà.l̥í/l̥í	*zɛ̀rà	*zɔ̰̀p	*ɲín	*léɓé ~ lémbè	*nú	*tɔ̀k	*gbà̰là̰	*l̥ì	*tè	*ɲɔŋ/l̥i	*l̥ín ~ l̥íŋ
Gbaya	Gbaya Bodoe	gbà.yík/yík	zèr	zɔ̀k	ɲín	léɓé	nú	tɔ̀k	gbàɲà	yì	tè	ɲɔŋ/yi	ɲín
Gbaya	Gbaya Biyanda	gbà.lí/lí	zàlà	zɔ̀	yínì	lémbè	nú	tɔ̀k	gbàlà	lì	tè	yɔŋ	líŋ
Gbaya	Gbeya	gbà.rí/rí	zɛ̀rà	zɔ̰̀p ~ zɔ̰̀fɔ̰̀	ɲín	lép ~ léfé	nú	tɔ̰̀k	gbà̰rà̰	rì	tè	ɲɔŋ/ri	ɲín
Gbaya	Manza	l̥ī	zàrà	zɔ̰̀	gòkò	lɛ̀fɛ̀	nū	tɔ̀	gbà̰l̥à̰	l̥ì	tè	ɲɔŋɔ	l̥ī
Gbaya	Mbodomo	lí	zàrà	zɔ̀p	ɲíní	lémbé	nú	ngíà	gbàlà	lì	tì	ɲɔŋ	líŋ
Gbaya	Bangando	gbà.lí/lí	jàlà	jɔ̀	ɲíì	ɗàmbè	nú	mbɛ́	gbàà	lì	tè	ɲɔŋgi/li	lí
Gbaya	Bofi	gbà.lī/lī	zàrà	zɔ̰̀	?	lēmbé	nū	tɔ̀ʔɔ̀	gbàlà	lì	tè	ɲɔŋ	líŋ
Ngbandi	Sango	lɛ́	mɛ́	hɔ̰́	pēmbē	mēngā	yángá	mɛ́nɛ̄ ~ ménē	bìō	ngú	kɛ̄kɛ̄ ~ kēkē	tɛ̀	īrī
Ngbandi	Yakoma	lɛ̄	mɛ̄	hɔ̰̄	tɛ̰̄	(lì.)mɛ̄ngá	ɲɔ̄, yāngā	mɛ́rɛ́	bỳō	ngú	kɛ̄kɛ̄	tɛ̀	ʔīrī
Ngbandi	Kpatiri	lá	mɛ́	hɔ̄	tɛ́	mīngā.ɲɔ̄	ɲɔ̄	mɛ́lɛ̄	bì	ngú	wì	tɛ̀	īrī
Baka	Ngbaka Mabo	zí.là/là	zḛ̀-	hṵ̄	tḛ̄-	mīnī-	mò-	nzḛ̄-	kúà-	ngó	náā	hō̰	ʔēlē-
Baka	Monzombo	là-	zḛ̀	ɲō̰	tḛ̄-	mī	mò-	nzḛ̄	bēyè	ngó	ló	zō̰	ʔē
Baka	Gbanzili	là/lí.là	zè	ʔō̰, ŋwū	tɛ́- ~ té-	mīlī ~ mēlē	mò-	nzɛ̄	kúà-	ngó	ná	zɔ̄	yēlē
Baka	Baka	là-	jɛ̀-	ɓàngà-	tɛ̄-	mī(l)-	mò-	njɛ̄, māndā	békè	ngō	lō	jō	ʔē-
Baka	Mayogo	jǐlà/bólà	-jɛ́	(w)ó	-tɛ́	-mí	-bú	ngɔ́tɛ́	běkì	-ngú	ndùlá	-zō	-lé
Baka	Mundu	jíà/rràgó	gó.jɛ̀	gò	tɛ́	mí	kɔ́.mò	ngɔ́tɛ́	bíkì	ngú	rró	zózò	írí
Mba	Ndunga-le	và-/bùlá-	jɔ̀mbɔ́-	mbētú-	tɛ́-	mí-	mó-	ɓíndá-	ɓéɓé	ngó-	gá-	-zɔ́-	ɗe-
Mba	Mba-ne	lá-/sí-	jɔ̄mbɔ̄-	hɔ̄mbɔ̀-	tɛ́-	mí-	cé-, mbɔ̀cɔ̀-	zí-	ɓēɓē	ngó-	gá-	zɔ̄-	ɗé-
Mba	Dongo-ko	lɔ̀-/sīē-	gyê	ŋù-	tɛ̀-	lyò-	mò-	nzì-	ɓèɓè	ngó-	pá-	zó-	lì-
Mba	Ama-lo	-fá-/-kúmbú-	-sí-	-wá̰-	-sɛ́-	-mɛ́-	-mú-	-kúkú-	ngátī-	-ngù-	-ngbúgà	sú-	-lí-
Sere	Sere	rɔ̄	tè	hɔ̀	tì	mɛ̀	nzɛ̄	zùmù	kpɔ̀kpɔ́	ngɔ̄	mú	zɔ̀	mà
Sere	Bare	vʌ̄.lō/tì.ló	sù	ŋò	vʌ̄.tì	mè	nzō	mvēlē	kʊ.ɓílì	ngō	ngʊ́	zà	lè
Banda	Lìndá	àlà/ēcī	ə̄tū	ngāwɨ̄	ə̄ʒī	tīmà	àmà	ə̄njī	gbābī	ə́ngú	āyɔ̄	zɨ̄	ʔɨ̄rɨ̄
Banda	Yàngere	làlà/cīcī	tūtū	màwō	zīzī	tìmè	màmà	njīnjī	gbēbī	ngúngú	ndōjō (~ njōjō ?)	zē	ʔērē
Banda	Ngàò	àlà/cícī	ūtū	màwū, ūwū	īʒī	tīmà	àmà	īnjī	gbāgbī	úngú	ōyō	zī	ʔīrī
Banda	Vàrà	àlà/cácū	ōtū	ngāwū	ēʒī	tīmà	àmà	ə̄njī	gbābī	ə́ngú	āyɔ̄	zɨ̄	ʔārā
Banda	Wójò	àlà/cɛ́cū	ūtū	ṵ̄w̰ṵ̄	kājī	tāmbī	àmà	(ʒ)īʒī	gbābī	úngú	(y)ōyō	zɨ	ērē
Banda	Dákpá	àlà/cácū	ōtū	ə̄wū	ə̄ʒī	tīmà	àmà	ə̄ʒī	gbābī	ə́ngú	ndɔ̄gɔ̄rɔ̄	zɨ̄	ʔīrē ~ ʔērē
Banda	Làngbàsi	làlà/cácù	tūtū	wūwū	ʒīʒī	tīmà	màmà	ʒīʒī	gbābī	ngúngú	yōyō	zɨ	ʔēʁə̄
Banda	Mbanza	célà/cúcū	tūtū	w̰ṵ̄w̰ṵ̄	zīzī	tīmbī	màmà	zī	gbābī	ə́ngú	yɔ̄yɔ̄	zɨ ~ zi	ʔēlē
Zande	Zande	bā̹ngìrī/kpā̹kpū	tū̹	ō	rīndē	mīrā	ngbā	kūrē	mēmē	ī̹mè/dí	ngūà	ri	rī̹mā ~ rū̹mā
Zande	Nzakara	bāngìlī	tū	ʔʊ̰̄	līndī	mīnlā	ngbā	kʊ̄lɛ̄	mɛ̄mɛ̄	ndīgì	ngʊ̄nlà	lɪ	nlūmā
Zande	Geme	índīrī/kpūkpū	tū	hɔ̄	līndī	māl.ngbā	ngbā	kūlē	mɛ̄mɛ̄	díī	wīlì	li	lūmā

=== Numerals ===
Comparison of numerals in individual languages:

Classification	Language	1	2	3	4	5	6	7	8	9	10
Banda	Mbanza (Mabandja)	bale	ɓìsi	vɔtɑ	vɑnɑ	mindu	ɡɑzɑlɑ	ɡɑzɑlɑ mɑnɑ bɑle (6 + 1)	nɡebeɗeɗe	nɡebeɗeɗe mɑnɑ bɑle (8 + 1)	ɓufu
Banda, Central Core, Banda-Bambari	Banda-Linda (1)	bale	biʃi	vɘta	vana	mīndū	mīndū ama nɘ bale (5 + 1)̄	mīndū ama nɘ bīʃi (5 + 2)	mīndū ama nɘ vɘta (5 + 3)	mīndū ama nɘ vana (5 + 4)	moɾofo
Banda, Central Core, Banda-Bambari	Banda-Linda (2)	bɑ̀lē	bīʃì	və̀tɑ̀	və̀nɑ̄	mīndû	mīndû ɑ̀ bɑ̀le (5 + 1)̄	mīndû ɑ̀ bīʃì (5 + 2)	mīndû ɑ̀ və̀tɑ̀ (5 + 3)	mīndû ɑ̀ və̀nɑ̄ (5 + 4)	mórófō
Banda, South Central	Ngbugu (1)	bàlē	bīʃùwú ~ bīʃǔ	vɔ̄tǎ	vɔànə̄	mīndúwù ~ mīndû	mīndû ma.̀nə̄ bàlē ~ mīndû kàlá bàlē	mīndû ma.̀nə̄ bīʃǔ ~ mīndû kàlá bīʃǔ	mīndû ma.̀nə̄ vɔ̄tǎ ~ mīndû kàlá vɔ̄tǎ	mīndû ma.̀nə̄ vɔànə̄ ~mīndû kàlá vɔànə̄	lə́.kɔ̄nɔ́.ɡbá
Banda, South Central	Ngbugu (2)	bàlè	bìʃùú	vòtàá	vwànɔ̄	mìndúù	mìndúù mànɜ̄ bàlè (5 + 1)̄	mìndúù mànɜ̄ bìʃùú (5 + 2)	mìndúù mànɜ̄ vòtàá (5 + 3)	mìndúù mànɜ̄ vwànɔ̄ (5 + 4)	lɜ̀konòɡ͡bè (lit: all the fingers)
Banda, South Central	Langbasi (Langbashe)	bɑ̀lē	bīʃì	vòtɑ̀	vɔ̀ɑ̀nō	mīndû	mīndû mɑ̀nə̄ bɑ̀le (5 + 1)̄	mīndû mɑ̀nə̄ bīʃì (5 + 2)	mīndû mɑ̀nə̄ vòtɑ̀ (5 + 3)	mīndû mɑ̀nə̄ vɔ̀ɑ̀nō (5 + 4)	kpɔ́lɔ́ kɔ̄nɔ́ (litː ' two hands ')
Banda, West Central	Banda-Tangbago	bɑ̀ɭē	bīʃì	vōtɑ̀	vɑ̀nɑ̄	mīndû	mīndû ɑ̀mɑ̀ nə̀ bɑ̀ɭē (5 + 1)	mīndû ɑ̀mɑ̀ nə̀ bīʃì (5 + 2)	mīndû ɑ̀mɑ̀ nə̀ vōtɑ̀ (5 + 3)	mīndû ɑ̀mɑ̀ nə̀ vɑ̀nɑ̄ (5 + 4)	móɾófò
Gbaya-Manza-Ngbaka, Central	Bokoto	n͡dáŋ	bùwá	tàɾ	nã́ɾ	mȭɾkȭ	mȭɾkȭ zã́ŋã́ n͡dáŋ (5 + 1)	mȭɾkȭ zã́ŋã́ bùwá (5 + 2)	mȭɾkȭ zã́ŋã́ tàɾ (5 + 3)	mȭɾkȭ zã́ŋã́ nã́ɾ (5 + 4)	ɓùkɔ̀
Gbaya-Manza-Ngbaka, Central	Bossangoa Gbaya	k͡pém	ɾíːtò	tàː	nàː	mɔ̃̀ːɾɔ̃̀	ɗòŋ k͡pém (5 + 1)	ɗòŋ ɾíːtò (5 + 2)	nũ̀nã́ː (2 x 4) ?	kùsì	ɓú
Gbaya-Manza-Ngbaka, East	Ngabaka	kpó	bɔ̀à	tàlɛ̀	nālɛ̄	mɔ̀lɔ̄	ɡàzɛ̀lɛ̀	ɡàzɛ̀lɛ̀-nɡɔ́-nɛ-kpó (6 + 1), sambo *	nɡbɛ̀ɗɛ̀ɗɛ̀	kùsì	ɓū
Gbaya-Manza-Ngbaka, Northwest	Northwest Gbaya	kpɔ́k	yíítòó	tààr	náár	mɔ̀ɔ̀rɔ́	mɔ̀ɔ̀rɔ́-ɗòŋ-kpɔ́k (5 + 1)	mɔ̀ɔ̀rɔ́-ɗòŋ-yíítòó (5 + 2)	mɔ̀ɔ̀rɔ́-ɗòŋ-tààr (5 + 3)	mɔ̀ɔ̀rɔ́-ɗòŋ-náár (5 + 4)	ɓú
Ngbandi	Northern Ngbandi	kɔi	sɛ	ta	siɔ	kɔ̃	mana	mbara mbara	miambe	ɡumbaya	sui kɔi
Ngbandi	Yakoma	òkɔ̀, ̀kɔ̀	ǒsɛ̀, ̌sɛ̀	òtá, ̀tá	òsyɔ̄, ̀syɔ̄	òkṵ̄, ̀kṵ̄	òmɛ̀rɛ̄, ̀mɛ̀rɛ̄	mbárámbárá	myɔ̀mbè	ɡūmbáyā	bàlé.kɔ̀ {ten.one}
Sere-Ngbaka-Mba, Ngbaka-Mba, Mba	Dongo	ɓawɨ	ɡ͡bwɔ̀	àrà	anà	vʉwɛ̀	kázyá	zyálá	nɡya-iɲo-ɡ͡bwɔ̀ (10 - 2) ?	nɡya-iɲyo-ɓayi (10 - 1) ?	ànɡ͡bà
Sere-Ngbaka-Mba, Ngbaka-Mba, Mba	Mba	úma	ɓiné	byala	aⁿɡ͡bote	ɓúma	ɓúma tele (5 + 1)	ɓúma te sené (5 + 2)	ɓúma te ɓyala (5 + 3)	ɓúma te aⁿɡ͡bote (5 + 4)	abusa
Sere-Ngbaka-Mba, Ngbaka-Mba, Ngbaka, Eastern, Mayogo-Bangba	Mayogo	ɓīnì	ɓīsī	ɓātā	ɓāɗā	búlúvūè	māɗíà	mānāníkà	mādʒɛ́nà	ōdúkpábīnì (10 - 1) ??	ndʒɛ̄kpà
Sere-Ngbaka-Mba, Ngbaka-Mba, Ngbaka, Eastern, Mundu	Mündü	bìrì, bìrìnɡ͡bɵ	ɓəsù	bata	bala	ɓúruve	màɗìyà	lɵ̀rɵzi	ɡ͡badzena	menewá	nzòkpa
Sere-Ngbaka-Mba, Ngbaka-Mba, Ngbaka, Western, Baka-Gundi	Baka	kpóde	bíde	batà	bàna	θuwè	θuwè tɛ kpóde (5+ 1)	θuwè tɛ bíde (5+ 2)	θuwè tɛ batà (5+ 3)	θuwè tɛ bàna (5+ 4)	kamo / θuwè tɛ θuwè (5+ 5)
Sere-Ngbaka-Mba, Ngbaka-Mba, Ngbaka, Western, Baka-Gundi	Limassa	kpóde	bíde	báíde	bàna	vue	síta	támbali	séna	vue lɛ bàna (5+ 4)	kpa bo pɛ (lit. all/both hands of person)
Sere-Ngbaka-Mba, Ngbaka-Mba, Ngbaka, Western, Bwaka	Ngabaka Ma'bo	k͡páàá ~ k͡páàkɔ́	ɓīsì	ɓātà	ɡ͡bīānā	ʔèvè ~ vè	sítà ~ sítā	sílànā	sɛ́nā	vìíìnā (5+ 4)	nzò k͡pā̰ (litː ' head / hand ')
Sere-Ngbaka-Mba, Ngbaka-Mba, Ngbaka, Western, Gbanzili	Gbanzili	k͡pókà	ɓīsì	ɓɔ̄tà ~ ɓōātà	ɓùānā ~ ɓɔ̄nā	vūè	sítà	sélènā ~ sáɓá	sánā	vūè-nà-ɓùānā (5+ 4) / liɓòà *	nzò k͡pā ~ ɡ͡bà
Sere-Ngbaka-Mba, Ngbaka-Mba, Ngbaka, Western, Monzombo	Monzombo	k͡póì	bīʃì	bālà	bàānā	vūè	ʃítà	ʃíēnā	sɛ́nā	ʔi̋vúēnā	nʒò k͡pā̰ (litː 'head of hand or arm')
Sere-Ngbaka-Mba, Sere, Sere-Bviri, Bai-Viri	Belanda Viri	njẽe	soó	taú	nãu	vöö́	vöö́-njoí-njẽe (5 + 1)	vöö́-njoí-soó (5 + 2)	vöö́-njoí-taú (5 + 3)	vöö́-njoí-nãu (5 + 4)	ɓï̃kürü
Sere-Ngbaka-Mba, Sere, Sere-Bviri, Ndogo-Sere	Ndogo	ɡbaànjé	só, sósò (used as an adjective)	táʔò	nàʔò	vó	vó-njeé-ɡbaànjé(5 + 1)	vó-njeé-só (5 + 2)	vó-njeé-táʔò (5 + 3)	vó-njeé-nàʔò (5 + 4)	muʔɓì (litː 'on hands ')
Zande, Zande-Nzakara	Nzakara (1)	kílī	īyō	ātā	ālù	ìsìbē	ìsìbē-ālí-kílī (5 + 1)	ìsìbē-ālí-īyō (5 + 2)	ìsìbē-ālí-ātā (5 + 3)	ìsìbē-ālí-ālù (5 + 4)	ŋɡ͡bō
Zande, Zande-Nzakara	Nzakara (2)	kílī	ījō	ātā	ālù	ìsìbē	ìsìbē-ālí-kílī (5 + 1)	ìsìbē-ālí-ījō (5 + 2)	ìsìbē-ālí-ātā (5 + 3)	ìsìbē-ālí-ālù (5 + 4)	ŋɡ͡bɔ̃̄
Zande, Zande-Nzakara	Zande	sá	úé	bíátá	bīànɡì ~ bīàmà (according to dialects)	bīsùè	bīsùè bàtì̧ sá (litː 'five save one')	bīsùè bàtì̧ úé (litː 'five save two')	bīsùè bàtì̧ bíátá (litː 'five save three')	bīsùè bàtì̧ bīànɡì ('five save four')	bàwē
