= Ali language =

Gbaya language of the CAR

Ali
- Native to: Central African Republic
- Native speakers: (65,000 cited 1996)
- Language family: Niger–Congo?: Atlantic–Congo; Savannas; Gbaya; Eastern; Gbanu–Ngbaka; Manza; Ali

Language codes
- ISO 639-3: Either: aiy – Ali ngg – Ngbaka Manza
- Glottolog: ngba1286

Ali (’Àlī) is a Gbaya language of the southwestern Central African Republic. Ngbaka Manza is closer to ’Ali proper than it is to its namesakes Manza or Ngbaka, though all may be mutually intelligible to some extent.
