= Northwest Gbaya language =

Savannas language spoken in Central Africa

Northwest Gbaya
- Native to: Cameroon, Central African Republic
- Native speakers: (65,000 in Cameroon cited 1980); 200,000 in CAR (1996), 2,000 in Congo (1993)
- Language family: Niger–Congo?: Atlantic–Congo; Savannas; Gbaya; Western; Northwest Gbaya
- Dialects: Kàrà; Làì; (3rd variety)

Language codes
- ISO 639-3: gya
- Glottolog: nort2775

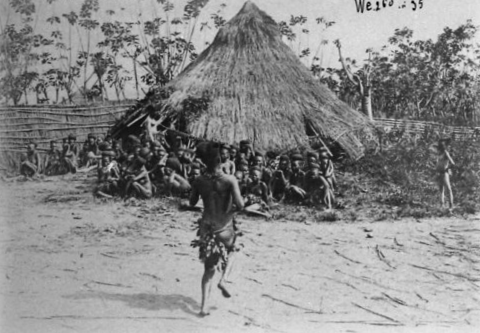
Gbaya tribesmen in the village of Gaza c.1905

Northwest Gbaya is a Gbaya language spoken across a broad expanse of Cameroon and the Central African Republic. The principal variety is Kara (Kàrà, Gbaya Kara), a name shared with several neighboring languages; Lay (Làì) is restricted to a small area north of Mbodomo, with a third between it and Toongo that is not named in Moñino (2010), but is influenced by the Gbaya languages to the south.

For male initiation rites, the Gbaya Kara use a language called La'bi.

== Phonology ==
The following information is based on the 'Bodoe (Kàrà) and northern dialects:

=== Consonants ===
| | | Labial | Alveolar | Palatal | Velar | Labio- velar | Glottal |
|---|---|---|---|---|---|---|---|
| Nasal | | m | n | ɲ | ŋ | ŋ͡m | |
| Plosive | voiceless | p | t | | k | k͡p | ʔ |
| Plosive | voiced | b | d | | ɡ | ɡ͡b | |
| Plosive | prenasal | ᵐb | ⁿd | | ᵑɡ | ᵑᵐɡ͡b | |
| Plosive | implosive | ɓ | ɗ | | | | |
| Fricative | voiceless | f | s | | | | h |
| Fricative | voiced | v | z | | | | |
| Tap/Trill | | (ⱱ) | r | | | | |
| Approximant | | | l | j | | w | |

- The labio-dental flap /ⱱ/ appears only in ideophonic adverbs within word-initial or intervocalic position.

=== Vowels ===
Oral vowels
| | Front | Central | Back |
|---|---|---|---|
| Close | i iː | | u uː |
| Close-mid | e eː | | o oː |
| Open-mid | ɛ ɛː | | ɔ ɔː |
| Open | | a aː | |

- /w/ can be heard as centralized [ẅ] when preceding front vowels /i, e, ɛ/.

Nasal vowels
| | Front | Central | Back |
|---|---|---|---|
| Close | ĩ ĩː | | ũ ũː |
| Open-mid | ɛ̃ ɛ̃ː | | ɔ̃ ɔ̃ː |
| Open | | ã ãː | |

- /w/ is heard as nasalized [w̃] when preceding nasal vowels.

== Writing system ==
Paulette Roulon-Doko uses a uses a phonetic transcription in her works on Northwest Gbaya. The nasal vowels are noted there with the tilde under the vowel letter ⟨a̰, ɛ̰, ḭ, ɔ̰, ṵ⟩.

Northwest Gbaya phonetic alphabet
| a | b | ɓ | d | ɗ | e | ɛ | f | g | gb | h | i | k | kp | l | m | mb | n | nd | ng | ngb | ɲ | ŋ | nm | p | ɔ | p | r | s | t | u | v | ʋ | w | y | z | ʔ |

In Cameroon, an alphabet based on the General Alphabet of Cameroonian Languages is used, notably in the translation of the Bible into Gbaya published by the Alliance biblique du Cameroun. The nasal vowels are noted there with the cedilla under the vowel letter ⟨a̧, ɛ̧, i̧, ɔ̧, u̧⟩.

Northwest Gbaya alphabet (Cameroon)
| a | b | ɓ | d | ɗ | e | ɛ | f | g | gb | h | i | k | kp | l | m | mb | n | nd | ng | ngb | ny | ŋ | nm | p | ɔ | p | r | s | t | u | v | w | y | z | ’ |
