= Bangba language =

Ubangian language of DR Congo

Bangba
- Native to: Democratic Republic of Congo
- Native speakers: (11,000 cited 1993)
- Language family: Ubangian: Sere–Mba; Ngbaka; Eastern; Mayogo–Bangba; Bangba

Language codes
- ISO 639-3: bbe
- Glottolog: bang1345

Bangba (Abangba) is a minor Ubangian language of DRC Congo. It is not close enough to other Eastern Ngbaka languages for mutual intelligibility.
