= Manza =

Manza may refer to:

- Manza language, a language of the Central African Republic
- Mânza River, in Romania
- Manza Bay, a bay of Tanzania
- Tata Manza, an automobile by Tata Motors, India

== People with the surname ==
- Ferruccio Manza (born 1943), Italian cyclist
- Nicholas Manza Kamakya (born 1985), Kenyan long-distance runner
