= Bofi =

Bofi of BofI may refer to:

- Axos Financial, formerly BofI, based in California
- Bank of Ireland, a commercial bank based in Ireland
- Bofi language of the Central African Republic (ISO 639-3 code: bofi)
