= Gbaya =

Gbaya may refer to:

- Gbaya people
- Gbaya languages
- Gbaya, Guinea, a community in Nzérékoré Prefecture
