= Gix =

GIX or Gix may refer to:

- George Von Elm (1901–1961), American golfer
- Ghana Internet Exchange
- Gilima language
