= Wojo =

Wojo is a common nickname for many people with long Polish or other eastern European surnames beginning "Woj-".

Wojo or WOJO could refer to:

== People ==
- David Wojcinski (born 1980), former Australian rules footballer
- Bob Wojnowski (born 1961), Detroit News sports writer, co-host of Stoney and Wojo with Mike Stone
- Steve Wojciechowski (born 1976), American college basketball head coach and former player
- Aleksander Wojtkiewicz (1963–2006), Polish chess player
- The Great Wojo, professional wrestler Greg Wojciechowski (born 1951)

== Other uses ==
- Detective Stan Wojciehowicz, a character from the television sitcom Barney Miller
- WOJO, a radio station (105.1 FM) licensed to Evanston, Illinois, United States
- Wojo, a dialect of the West Banda language, spoken in the Central African Republic and South Sudan
- Wojo railway station, a stop on the Prambanan Express in Indonesia
