= MZV =

MZV may refer to:

- Mulu Airport, the IATA code MZV
- Manza language, the ISO 639-3 code mzv
