= Matupi =

Matupi may refer to:

- Matupi Township in Mindat District, Chin State, Myanmar
  - Matupi, Myanmar, its chief town
  - Matupi language or Batu, spoken by residents of the town
- Matupi Harbour, New Britain
- Matupi Cave, in the Democratic Republic of the Congo
