= Ngala language =

Ngala may be:

- Lingala language, a Bantu trade language
- Bangala language, another Bantu trade language, close to Lingala
- Ngala language (Chadic), a Kotoko language
- Ngala language (Sepik), an Ndu language
- Ngala language (Zande), described by Santandrea
- the Ngala dialect of Khumi Chin
- Nga La language
