= Ma language =

Ubangian language spoken in DR Congo

Ma
- aMãlo
- Native to: Democratic Republic of the Congo
- Native speakers: (4,700 cited 1977)
- Language family: Ubangian: Sere–Mba; Ngbaka–Mba; Mba languages; Ma

Language codes
- ISO 639-3: msj
- Glottolog: made1252

Ma, also known as a-Mã-lo, Amadi, Madi, Madyo, is a Ubangian language spoken in Haut-Uele Province, the Democratic Republic of the Congo.
