= Gbanu language =

Gbaya language of the Central African Republic

Gbanu
- Native to: Central African Republic
- Ethnicity: Gbaya
- Native speakers: (95,000 cited 1996)
- Language family: Niger–Congo?: Atlantic–Congo; Savannas; Gbaya; Eastern; Gbanu–Ngbaka; Gbanu

Language codes
- ISO 639-3: gbv
- Glottolog: gban1260

Gbanu (Gbànù, Banu, Gbanou) is a Gbaya language of the Central African Republic. The people do not consider themselves to be ethnically Gbaya.

== Phonology ==
Gbanu has 14 vowels, oral /i e ɛ a ɔ o u/ and nasal /ĩ ẽ ɛ̃ ã ɔ̃ õ ũ/. Syllables may be maximally CVN, where N is /m/ or /n/. There are four tones on CV syllables, high, low, rising, and falling. Words have six tone patterns, those four plus dipping (falling–rising) and peaking (rising–falling).

=== Vowels ===
	Front	Front, Nasal	Back	Back, nasal
Close	i	ĩ	u	ũ
Close-mid	e	ẽ	o	õ
Open-mid	ɛ	ɛ̃	ɔ	ɔ̃
Open	a	ã		

=== Tones ===
Tone	Rising	High	Low	Falling

=== Consonants ===
m	n	j~ɲ		w~ŋm	
mb	nd		ŋɡ	ŋmɡb	
ɓ~ˀm	ɗ~ˀn				
p	t		k	kp	ʔ
b	d		ɡ	ɡb	
f	s			h	
v	z				
	nz				
	l				

Intervocallically, the only voicing distinction that is maintained is /s, z/; otherwise only voiceless oral stops and fricatives occur between vowels. Nasal consonants lightly nasalize surrounding vowels, and nasal vowels, including those triggered by nasal consonants, nasalize the glottalized consonants. The approximants /j w/ do not occur with nasal vowels, and so may not be phonemic; /j~ɲ/, /w~mŋ/ may be posited as the underlying phonemes.
