= Ngbundu language =

Ubangian language of the DR Congo

Ngbundu
- Native to: Democratic Republic of the Congo
- Native speakers: (16,000 cited 1984 census)
- Language family: Ubangian: Banda; Ngbundu

Language codes
- ISO 639-3: nuu
- Glottolog: ngbu1241

Ngbundu is a minor Ubangian language (Banda) of the Democratic Republic of the Congo.
