= Bozom language =

Gbaya language of the CAR

Bozom
- Native to: Central African Republic
- Native speakers: (33,000 cited 1996)
- Language family: Niger–Congo?: Atlantic–Congo; Savannas; Gbaya; Western; Bokoto–Bozom; Bozom

Language codes
- ISO 639-3: gbq
- Glottolog: gbay1286

Bokoto (Ɓòzôm, Gbaya-Bozoum) is a Gbaya language of the Central African Republic. Ethnologue reports it may be mutually intelligible with Gbaya-Bossangoa.
