= Mbaka people =

Mbaka
Total population
- 300,000

Regions with significant populations
- Central African Republic, DR Congo

Languages
- Native; Mbaka; Also; Sango, Lingala, French

Religion
- Christianity, traditional African religions

The Mbaka are a minority ethnic group in the Central African Republic and northwest Democratic Republic of the Congo. The M'Baka speak the Mbaka language and have a population of roughly 300,000.

== Language ==
The Mbakas speak Mbaka language, a Ubangian language. The Gilima variety is assigned to a separate ISO 639-3 code.

== Notable Mbaka people ==
- Jean-Bédel Bokassa, former president and self-styled emperor of Central African Republic
- Brigette Dacko, former first lady of the Central African Republic and second wife of David Dacko
- David Dacko, first President of Central African Republic
- Barthélemy Boganda, first prime minister of Central African Republic
- Koffi Olomide, Congolese singer
- Alphonsine Yangongo-Boganda, Central African politician, member of National Assembly (1998–2003)
