= Nzakara language =

Zande language of Central Africa

Nzakara
- Native to: Central African Republic, Democratic Republic of the Congo
- Native speakers: (50,000 in CAR cited 1996)
- Language family: Niger–Congo?: Atlantic–Congo; Volta–Congo; Savannas?; Ubangian; Zande languages; Zande–Nzakara; Nzakara
- Writing system: Latin

Language codes
- ISO 639-3: nzk
- Glottolog: nzak1247

Nzakara (Ansakara, N’sakara, Sakara, Zakara) is a Zande language spoken in eastern Central African Republic, spilling over into the Democratic Republic of the Congo. It may be intelligible with Zande proper, at least for some speakers.

== Writing system ==
Nzakara alphabet
a	b	d	e	f	g	gb	i	ɨ	k	kp	l	m	mb	mv	n	nd	ng	ngb	ny	nz	o	p	s	t	u	ʉ	v	w	y	z
