= Dongo language =

Ubangian language of DR Congo

ʼDongo
- Ɗongoko
- Native to: Democratic Republic of Congo
- Native speakers: (13,000 cited 2000)
- Language family: Ubangian: Sere–Mba; Ngbaka–Mba; Mba languages; ʼDongo

Language codes
- ISO 639-3: doo
- Glottolog: dong1290

ʼDongo (Donga, Ɗongo-ko) is a Ubangian language spoken in Haut-Uele Province, DR Congo.
