= Alphonsine Yangongo-Boganda =

Central African secretary and politician (born 1949)

Member of National Assembly
- In office 1998–2003
- Constituency: 3rd arrondissement

Personal details
- Born: 2 August 1949 (age 77) Bobangui, Ubangi-Shari (now the present-day Central African Republic)
- Party: MDD; MESAN ?-2005
- Occupation: Politician

Alphonsine Marie Yangongo-Boganda (born 2 August 1949) is a Central African secretary and politician.

== Early life and education ==
Belonging to Mbaka people, Alphonsine was born on 2 November 1949 in Bobangui to Barthélemy Boganda (Note: Barthélemy Boganda never officially acknowledged Alphonsine as his first child.) and Marceline Remandazou. Her parents were separated in an unknown year, and she was raised by her stepmother, Michelle. However, she had a tense relationship with her stepmother, prompting her to live with her uncle secretly in Bambari. In 1962, Dacko took Alphonsine and she was handed over to her paternal uncle, Norbert Yangongo, to be raised. She took secretarial studies at the Lycée technique in Bangui.

== Career and late life ==
Upon graduating from school, Alphonsine entered civil service on 4 January 1968 and was placed at the Ministry of Public Health as a secretary.

Alphonsine began her political career by joining MDD party. She ran for the 1998 Central African parliamentary election as an MDD candidate representing the 3rd arrondissement and won a seat in parliament. In the National Assembly, she was part of the opposition and a member of the Committee on Education and Social Affairs. In February 1999, she filed a complaint against Crime Prevention Central Agency (OCRB) who conducted an unwanted search in her home for allegedly possessing illegal guns. Later, she dropped the complaint after the head of OCRB sent his apology.

She later left MDD and joined MESAN. However, she was expelled from the party in 2005 due to her endorsement of Olivier Gabirault's candidacy at 2005 Central African general election. During the 2005 election campaign, she served as Gabirault's campaign director.

Alphonsine currently lives in France.

== Award ==
- , Knight Order of Central African Merit – 7 November 1975.

== Bibliography ==
- van Walraven, Klaas (2017). "The Diaries of Barthélémy Boganda, Priest and Politician in French Equatorial Africa (1910–1959)". History in Africa. 44.
