= Monzombo language =

Ubangian language spoken in the Congos

Kpala
- Native to: Democratic Republic of the Congo, Republic of Congo
- Region: Équateur Province (NW)
- Native speakers: (19,000 cited 1986–1993)
- Language family: Ubangian: Sere–Mba; Ngbaka; Western; Kpala

Language codes
- ISO 639-3: Variously: moj – Monzombo kpl – Kpala yng – Yango
- Glottolog: monz1253
- ELP: Monzombo
- Yango

Monzombo is a minor Ubangian language of the Congos.

There are three varieties, Monzombo (Mondjembo), Kpala (Kwala), and Yango, which Ethnologue lists separately. It is not clear how distinct they are.
