= Barambu language =

Zande language spoken in DR Congo

Barambu
- Native to: Democratic Republic of the Congo
- Native speakers: (26,000 cited 1990 census)
- Language family: Niger–Congo?: Zande; Barambo–Pambia; Barambu

Language codes
- ISO 639-3: brm
- Glottolog: bara1361
- ELP: Barambu

Barambu is Zande language spoken in the northeast of the Democratic Republic of the Congo. It is spoken by the Barambu people.
