= Ndunga language =

Ubangian language spoken in DR Congo

Ndunga
- Native to: Democratic Republic of Congo
- Region: Lisala Territory, Mongala Province
- Native speakers: (2,500 cited 1977)
- Language family: Ubangian: Sere–Mba; Ngbaka–Mba; Mba languages; Ndunga

Language codes
- ISO 639-3: ndt
- Glottolog: ndun1249

Ndunga (Bondonga, Modunga, Mondugu, Mondunga) is a Ubangian language spoken in 8 villages of Lisala Territory in Mongala Province, DR Congo (Ethnologue, 22nd ed.).
