= Geme language =

Zande language of the CAR

Geme
- Ngba Geme
- Native to: Central African Republic
- Native speakers: (550 cited 1996)
- Language family: Niger–Congo?: Atlantic-Congo; Volta-Congo; Adamawa–Ubangian; Ubangian; Zande languages; Zande–Nzakara; Geme
- Dialects: Geme Tulu; Geme Kulagbolu

Language codes
- ISO 639-3: geq
- Glottolog: geme1244
- ELP: Geme

Geme is a Zande language spoken in two small villages of the Central African Republic.

Gɛ̀mɛ́ or Jɛ̀mɛ́ is spoken north of Ndélé in two villages that are 9 kilometers apart from each other, namely Aliou (350 people, known as the Gɛ̀mɛ́ Tulu) and Goz Amar II (50 people, known as the Gɛ̀mɛ́ Kúlágbòlù). Together, their common language is known as Ngba Gɛ̀mɛ́.
