= Laʼbi language =

Ritual language spoken in Cameroon

Laʼbi
- Native to: Cameroon
- Speakers: 4,400 L2 speakers (2006)
- Language family: Niger–Congo?: Atlantic–Congo; Mbum–Day?; Laʼbi

Language codes
- ISO 639-3: lbi
- Glottolog: labi1244

Laʼbi is the esoteric ritual language of male initiation among the Gbaya Kara, the Mbum, and some Sara Laka, in the area of Touboro near where the CAR, Chad, and Cameroon meet. It has no native speakers, but is used by 4,400 people. It is related to Mbum, with substantial loans from one or more Sara languages.

A word list is given in Periquet (1915).
