= Ngala language (Zande) =

Zande language spoken in DR Congo

Ngala
- Native to: Democratic Republic of the Congo
- Language family: Niger–Congo?: Zande; Barambo–Pambia; Ngala

Language codes
- ISO 639-3: None (mis)
- Glottolog: ngal1296

Ngala is a Zande language spoken in the northeast of the Democratic Republic of the Congo. It has been influenced by one or more of the Banda languages.
