= Yangere language =

Ubangian language of the Central African Republic

Yangere
- Native to: Central African Republic
- Native speakers: (27,000 cited 1996)
- Language family: Ubangian: Banda; Central; Yangere

Language codes
- ISO 639-3: yaj
- Glottolog: band1348

Yangere is a Ubangian language of the Central African Republic. It is closely related to Central Banda. The Banda Yangere are centered around Berberati.
