= Biyanda-Buli language =

Gbaya language of the CAR

Biyanda-Buli
- Southwest Gbaya
- Native to: Central African Republic
- Native speakers: 200,000 (2007); Includes Toongo
- Language family: Niger–Congo?: Atlantic–Congo; Savannas; Gbaya; Southern; Biyanda-Buli
- Dialects: Biyanda; Buli

Language codes
- ISO 639-3: gso (partial)
- Glottolog: sout2785

Biyanda (Ɓìyàndà) and Buli (Ɓùlì) constitute a Gbaya language of the Central African Republic. Ethnologue groups them as Southwest Gbaya, but it is not clear how many of the Southwest varieties are part of the same language; Toongo and Mbodomo, for example, are not closely related, though Toongo speakers identify ethnically as Buli, and Ethnologue also lists Mbodomo as a separate language.

== Phonology ==
Consonants
	Labial	Alveolar	Palatal	Velar	Labiovelar	Glottal
Plosive	p b	t d		k g	kp gb	ʔ
Implosive	ɓ	ɗ				
Prenasalized	ᵐb	ⁿd, ⁿz		ᵑg	ᵑgb	
Fricative	f v	s z				h
Nasal	m	n		ŋ		
Approximant	w	l	j			

Vowels
	Front	Central	Back
High	i		u
Mid-high	e		o
Mid-low	ɛ		ɔ
Low		a	

There are also four tones; high, low, falling, and rising.
