= Mayogo language =

Ubangian language of DR Congo

Mayogo
- Native to: Democratic Republic of Congo
- Native speakers: (100,000 cited 1991)
- Language family: Ubangian: Sere–Mba; Ngbaka; Eastern; Mayogo–Bangba; Mayogo

Language codes
- ISO 639-3: mdm
- Glottolog: mayo1261

Mayogo (also spelled Mayugo, Majugu, Maigo, Maiko, Mayko and also called Kiyogo) is a Ubangian language spoken by the Day (Angai), Maambi, and Mangbele peoples of the Democratic Republic of the Congo. It is not close enough to Bangba, the most closely related language, for mutual intelligibility.

== Writing system ==
Mayogo alphabet
a	b	bh	d	dh	dy	dj	e	f	g	gb	h	i	ɨ	k	kp	l	m	mb	n	nd	ndj	ng	ngb	nv	o	ɵ	p	s	t	ts	u	ʉ	v	w	y	z
