= Matupi Cave =

- Matupi Cave
- 1.193327°N 30.008462°E
- Location: Democratic Republic of the Congo

Matupi Cave is a cave in the Mount Hoyo massif of the Ituri Rainforest, Democratic Republic of the Congo, where archaeologists have found evidence for Late Stone Age human occupation spanning over 40,000 years. The cave has some of the earliest evidence in the world for microlithic tool technologies.

== Location and significance ==
Matupi Cave is one of some 40 caves in the Mount Hoyo limestone massif in the Ituri rainforest, Democratic Republic of the Congo. It is a large cave (c. 7 metres high, 8 metres deep and 5 metres wide), which makes it ideal for living. The Matupi Cave site was excavated in 1973-74 by a joint archaeological expedition from the Institut des Musées Nationaux du Zaïre (DRC) and the Royal Museum for Central Africa (Tervuren, Belgium). The excavation campaign was led by professor Francis Van Noten, then head of the Prehistory-Archaeology section in Tervuren.

Excavations yielded Iron Age and Late Stone Age artifacts, as well as rich faunal and sporadic palynological remains. The special significance of the Matupi Cave finds is that these provide some of the earliest evidence for microlithic tool technologies found in Central Africa and beyond (up to +40,000 years before present – BP). Moreover, the Matupi Cave excavations prove that the term Late Stone Age should not be used in a chronological sense, but only in a technological one. Finally, Matupi Cave provides important clues as to climatological changes taking place in the area over at least the past 12,000 years.

== Excavation campaign and finds ==
Professor Van Noten and his team excavated 10 square metres in the cave in spits of 5 cm on a 1 square metre grid system.

Artifacts

The excavations revealed distinct layers. The deposits of the top layer (15–25 cm) contained modern items mixed with Iron Age artifacts. Below this, from 25 to 210 cm, the excavation team came upon an unspoilt microlithic Late Stone Age deposit. In grid I-G alone 8,045 artifacts of microlithic material were found, of which 824 (10.2%) are either implements or artifacts that show traces of use. Almost all artifacts are of milky vein quartz. Only about 4% of the raw material consists of other rocks (quartzite, flint, sandstone, etc.). The concentration of the artifacts was relatively low in the upper levels (25–65 cm), very rich in the middle levels (65–140 cm: including a fragment of a decorated bored stone), and again poorer in the lower (140–185 cm) and lowest levels (185–210 cm). The most common implements found are scrapers, borers and burins.

The artifacts that show traces of use are mostly flakes and flake fragments. All are typical of a Late Stone Age industry, with different modes of production in evidence. The high proportion of wood-working tools suggests that many artifacts, no longer in evidence, may have been made out of wood. This possibly includes wood projectiles for weapons.

Burnt soil and concentrations of charcoal, principally in the middle levels, point to more or less large hearths, in which small burnt quartzite pebbles occur. The only other archaeological feature is an irregular stone wall, seemingly closing off the main area at the entrance of the cave from a corridor leading to the darker interior parts. At the middle level, a sequence of hearths on the daylight side of this wall suggests a frequently occupied living area.

Faunal Remains

Prof. Wim Van Neer of the Royal Museum for Central Africa carried out extensive taphonomic, palaeoecological and palaeoeconomical analysis of the faunal remains found in Matupi Cave. The remains of animal bones are extremely fragmented: the length of 90% of the fragments found does not exceed 2.5 cm. As a consequence, it was only possible to securely identify about 8% of all bone fragments. Again, the richest finds belong to the middle layers. Many identified fragments can be characterised as food refuse and originated from bovids, cephalophus (duiker and other types of small antelopes), suidae, (fruit) bats and rodents. More or less sporadic remains of birds, reptiles, fish and molluscs are believed to have been mainly brought in by man.

Pollen and Spores

Finally, palynological analyses carried out by Dr. E. Roche revealed the presence of pollen and spores at the top and base of the deposit only. At the 25–50 cm level, these were identified as originating from Gramineae, Petridaceae and Polypodiaceae. The Gramineae are typical for an open savanna landscape, while the Pteridaceae and Polypodiaceae are indicative of moist forests or gallery-forests. Rare pollen of Gramineae were also found at a depth of 500–525 cm, again indicating a savanna environment.

Additional data collected in Matupi Cave in the 1980s on speleothems (mineral deposits formed from ground water such as stalagmites and stalactites) to this day remain to be analysed (communication of the Royal Museum for Central Africa).

== Dating ==
The dating of the different excavated layers has been secured through carbon-14 dating. For the middle layer, C-14 evidence was corroborated by thermoluminescence dating. The proposed approximative dates for the different layers are:

Matupi Cave C-14 Dating
Excavated Layer (depth in cm.)	Proposed dates (Before Present)
Top (Iron Age) – 15–25 cm	< 3,000 BP
Upper (Late Stone Age) – 25–65 cm	ca. 3,000 – 12,000 BP
Middle (Late Stone Age) – 65–140 cm	ca. 12,000 – 21,000 BP
Lower (Late Stone Age) – 140–185 cm	ca. 21,000 – 32,000 BP
Lowest (Late Stone Age) – 185–210 cm	ca. 32,000 – > 40,700 BP

The dating of artifacts (bone fragments) found at the lowest level to +40,000 BP, makes that the microliths found at this level at Matupi Cave rank among the oldest in Africa (and beyond) for a Late Stone Age site. The presence of Late Stone Age materials in all excavated layers means that the term “Late Stone Age” does not have a chronological meaning, but rather a technological one.

The abundance of fruit bat remains that show no marks of having been eaten, combined with a lower density of artifacts found in the upper layers, are a clear indication that the cave may have been abandoned for longer periods of time before being inhabited again.

== Climatological changes ==
The nature of the faunal remains and the palynological analyses provide evidence for climatological changes taking place in the Matupi Cave area. The upper levels yielded a preponderance of animals typical of high forest and other densely wooded biotopes. The presence of forest animals decreases strongly below 30 cm. Their place is taken by animals typical of open habitats. Using radiocarbon samples from grids I-E and I-G, this transition from savanna to forest habitat can only be dated very approximately, due to irregularities in sedimentation. It seems cautious to conclude that the transition from savanna or savanna with nearby gallery-forest to dense forest (as it exists today around Matupi Cave) must have occurred between 12,000 and 3,000 BP. This is not inconsistent with climate research for Central Africa that postulates a wetter climate, more conducive to forest extension, from about 12,000 BP and particularly between 10,000 and 5,000 BP.

== See also ==
- Archaeology of Central Africa
