= Mba languages =

Mba
- Geographic distribution: Democratic Republic of the Congo
- Linguistic classification: Ubangian: Seri–Mba; Ngbaka–Mba; Mba

Language codes
- Glottolog: mbai1246

The four Mba languages form a small family of Ubangian languages scattered across the northern Democratic Republic of the Congo. The languages are,

- Ma (a-Mã-lo)
- Ɗongo-ko
- Mba-ne
- Ndunga-le

The most populous is Mba itself, with about 40,000 speakers. Ma is the most divergent. The four Mba languages are not particularly closely related to each other and display considerable lexical diversity.

== Language contact ==
The Mba languages have received significant influences from Bantu to the south, and from Zande languages to the north. For example, some Mba languages such as Ndunga have borrowed many noun prefixes from nearby Bantu languages (Pasch 1986, 1987, 1988).

== Internal classification ==
Mba internal classification according to Pasch (1986):

Mba

- A-Ma-Lo
- Ndunga-Mba-'Dongo
  - 'Dongo-ko
  - Ndunga-Mba
    - Ndunga-le
    - Mba-ne
