= South Banda language =

Ubangian language spoken in central Africa

South Banda
- Native to: Central African Republic, Democratic Republic of the Congo
- Native speakers: (200,000 cited 1996)
- Language family: Ubangian: Banda; South Banda

Language codes
- ISO 639-3: Either: lnl – South Central Banda lna – Langbashe
- Glottolog: sout2786

South Banda is a dialect continuum of the Banda languages spoken by around 200,000 or so people, primarily in the Central African Republic but with ten thousand or so in the Democratic Republic of the Congo (6,000 as of the 1984 census). The two varieties may be mutually intelligible.

== Phonology ==
=== Consonants ===
		Labial	Dental/ Alveolar	Post- alveolar	Palatal	Velar		Uvular	Glottal
		Labial	Dental/ Alveolar	Post- alveolar	Palatal	plain	lab.	Uvular	Glottal
Nasal		m	n		ɲ				
Plosive/ Affricate	voiceless	p	t	t͡ʃ		k	k͡p		ʔ
Plosive/ Affricate	voiced	b	d	d͡ʒ		ɡ	ɡ͡b		
Plosive/ Affricate	prenasal	ᵐb	ⁿd	ⁿd͡ʒ		ᵑɡ	ᵑᵐɡ͡b		
Plosive/ Affricate	implosive	ɓ	ɗ						
Fricative	voiceless	f	s	ʃ				(χ)	h
Fricative	voiced	v	z	ʒ				ʁ	
Tap				ɽ					
Lateral			l						
Approximant					j		w		

- /ʁ/ is heard as a voiceless fricative [χ] when occurring after a voiceless consonant.

=== Vowels ===
	Front	Central	Back
Close	i ĩ	ɨ	u ũ
Close-mid	e	ə	o
Open-mid	ɛ	ə	ɔ ɔ̃
Open		a ã	
