= Mba language =

Ubangian language of DR Congo

Mba
- Native to: Democratic Republic of Congo
- Native speakers: (36,000 cited 2000)
- Language family: Ubangian: Sere–Mba; Ngbaka–Mba; Mba languages; Mba

Language codes
- ISO 639-3: mfc
- Glottolog: mbaa1245

Mba, also known as (Ki)Manga or (Ki)Mbanga, is a Ubangian language spoken in the Banjwade area of Banalia Territory, Tshopo Province, DR Congo (Ethnologue, 22nd ed.).
