= Ngbaka Minagende language =

Gbaya language of DR Congo

Ngbaka
- Ngbaka Minagende
- Ngbaka Gbaya
- Native to: Democratic Republic of Congo
- Native speakers: (1.02 million cited 2000)
- Language family: Niger–Congo?: Atlantic–Congo; Savannas; Gbaya; Eastern; Gbanu–Ngbaka; Ngbaka

Language codes
- ISO 639-3: nga
- Glottolog: ngba1285

Ngbaka (Ngbàkà) is a Gbaya language spoken by just over a million people in the Democratic Republic of the Congo. It is a regionally important language, used by the Gilima, Ngbundu, Mbandja and Mono peoples, and is taught in primary schools; 10% are literate in Ngbaka.

Ngbaka is a common local ethnic name; the language may be distinguished from other languages called "Ngbaka" as Ngbaka Gbaya or Ngbaka Minagende.

There are no significant dialectal differences within Ngbaka, and it may be mutually intelligible with members of the Manza dialect cluster.

== Phonology ==
=== Consonants ===
		Labial	Alveolar	Palatal	Velar	Labio- velar	Glottal
Nasal		m	n	ɲ	ŋ	ŋ͡m	
Plosive	voiceless	p	t		k		ʔ
Plosive	voiced	b	d		ɡ		
Plosive	prenasal	ᵐb	ⁿd		ᵑɡ		
Implosive	voiced	ɓ	ɗ			ɠ͡ɓ	
Implosive	voiceless					ɠ̊͡ɓ̥	
Implosive	prenasal					ᵑᵐɠ͡ɓ	
Fricative	voiceless	f	s				h
Fricative	voiced	v	z				
Fricative	prenasal		ⁿz				
Trill			(r)				
Tap		ⱱ	ɺ				
Approximant			l	j		w	

- The trill /r/ mainly occurs in ideophones, in both initial and final position. When it occurs in loanwords, it is often pronounced as a lateral [l].
- The glottal stop /ʔ/ mostly occurs before word-initial vowels.
- Sounds /ŋ͡m, ʔ, h, w/, do not appear in intervocalic position.
- /ŋ/ does not appear in word-initial position
- The fricative /f/ can be pronounced in the western dialects as a voiceless stop [p].
- The voiceless stop /k/ can be pronounced as a voiced stop [ɡ] in the western dialects.

=== Vowels ===
	Oral vowels			Nasal vowels		
	Front	Central	Back	Front	Central	Back
Close	i iː		u uː	ĩ		ũ
Close-mid	e eː		o oː			
Open-mid	ɛ ɛː		ɔ ɔː	ɛ̃		ɔ̃
Open		a aː			ã	

== Writing system ==
Alphabet ngbaka
Uppercase
A	B	ʼB	D	ʼD	E	Ɛ	F	G	Gb	H	I	K	Kp	L	M	N	Ng	Ngg	O	Ɔ	S	T	U	V	W	Z
Lowercase
a	b	ʼb	d	ʼd	e	ɛ	f	g	gb	h	i	k	kp	l	m	n	ng	ngg	o	ɔ	s	t	u	v	w	z

Nasalisation is indicated with a tilde on the vowel : ⟨ã, ɛ̃, ĩ, ɔ̃, ũ⟩.

The tones of the syllables are shown with diacritics to prevent ambiguity :

- the high tone is indicated with the acute accent : ⟨á, é, ɛ́, í, ó, ɔ́, ú, ã́, ɛ̃́, ĩ́, ɔ̃́, ṹ⟩ ;
- the low tone is indicated with the grave accent : ⟨à, è, ɛ̀, ì, ò, ɔ̀, ù, ã̀, ɛ̃̀, ĩ̀, ɔ̃̀, ũ̀⟩ ;
- the following tones are not usually indicated in the spelling but may be indicated in some linguistic works :
  - the medium tone with the vertical line above : ⟨a̍, e̍, ɛ̍, i̍, o̍, ɔ̍, u̍, ã̍, ɛ̃̍, ĩ̍, ɔ̃̍, ũ̍⟩ ;
  - the falling tone with the circumflex accent : ⟨â, ê, ɛ̂, î, ô, ɔ̂, ã̂, ɛ̃̂, ĩ̂, ɔ̃̂, ũ̂⟩ ;
  - the rising tone with the caron/hacek : ⟨ǎ, ě, ɛ̌, ǐ, ǒ, ɔ̌, ã̌, ɛ̃̌, ĩ̌, ɔ̃̌, ũ̌⟩.
