= Gbaya languages =

Language family

Gbaya
- Gbaya–Manza–Ngbaka
- Geographic distribution: Central African Republic, Democratic Republic of the Congo, Republic of the Congo, Cameroon
- Linguistic classification: Niger–Congo?: Atlantic–Congo; Volta-Congo; Savannas; Gbaya
- Proto-language: Proto-Gbaya

Language codes
- ISO 639-2 / 5: gba
- Glottolog: gbay1279

The Gbaya languages, also known as Gbaya–Manza–Ngbaka, are a family of perhaps a dozen languages spoken mainly in the western Central African Republic and across the border in Cameroon, with one language (Ngbaka) in the Democratic Republic of the Congo, and several languages with few speakers in the Republic of the Congo. Many of the languages go by the ethnic name Gbaya, though the largest, with over a million speakers, is called Ngbaka, a name shared with the Ngbaka languages of the Ubangian family.

== History ==
Moñino (1995:22) proposes that the Proto-Gbaya homeland was located in an area around Carnot, Central African Republic., also Gbaya people are in western part of South Sudan mainly Dem Zebeer to Raga all the way to Boro on Central African border.

== Classification ==
The Gbaya languages are traditionally classified as part of the Ubangian family.

Moñino (2010), followed by Blench (2012), propose that they may instead be most closely related to the Central Gur languages, or perhaps constitute an independent branch of Niger–Congo, but that they do not form a group with Ubangian. Connections with Bantu are mostly limited to cultural vocabulary, and several Central Sudanic words suggest that the proto-Gbaya were hunter-gatherers who acquired agriculture from the Sara.

Proto-Gbaya vocabulary shared with Adamawa languages includes millet farming vocabulary, as well as terms for the elephant, guineafowl, Parkia biglobosa, Khaya senegalensis, and Ceiba pentandra, which are indicative of a language continuum native to a savanna environment.

== Languages ==
Moñino (2010) reconstructed proto-Gbaya and proposes the following family tree:

- Gbaya
  - - Southern
      - Bàngàndò
      - Ɓùlì, Ɓìyàndà
    - Western (Northern)
      - - Tòòngò
        - Làì, Kàrà
      - - Ɓòkòtò
        - Ɓòzôm, Gbɛ́yá
  - Eastern
    - - Mbódɔ̀mɔ̀
      - Ɓòfì
    - - - - ʔÀlī, Ngbākā-Mānzā
          - Mānzā
        - Ngbàkà
      - Gbànù

Several of these varieties may be mutually intelligible, such as Ngbaka, Ngbaka Manza, and Manza.

There are one or two other small Gbaya languages scattered in Congo and along the Cameroon border, such as Bonjo.

== See also ==
- List of Proto-Gbaya reconstructions (Wiktionary)
