= Mbandja language =

Banda language spoken in central Africa

Mbandja
- Native to: Democratic Republic of the Congo, Republic of Congo, Central African Republic
- Native speakers: (360,000 cited 2000)
- Language family: Ubangian: Banda; Mbandja
- Dialects: Kala; Gbado

Language codes
- ISO 639-3: zmz
- Glottolog: mban1263

Mbandja (Banja, Mbanza) is the largest of the Banda languages. There are 350,000 speakers in DRC, 10,000 in the Republic of Congo, and an unknown number in CAR.

== Phonology ==
=== Consonants ===
		Bilabial	Labio- dental	Dental/ Alveolar	Post- alveolar	Palatal	Velar		Glottal
		Bilabial	Labio- dental	Dental/ Alveolar	Post- alveolar	Palatal	plain	lab.	Glottal
Nasal		m		n		ɲ	(ŋ)		
Plosive/ Affricate	voiceless	p		t	t͡ʃ		k	k͡p	ʔ
Plosive/ Affricate	voiced	b		d	d͡ʒ		ɡ	ɡ͡b	
Plosive/ Affricate	prenasal	ᵐb		ⁿd	ⁿd͡ʒ		ᵑɡ	ᵑɡ͡b	
Plosive/ Affricate	implosive	ɓ		ɗ					
Fricative	voiceless		f	s	ʃ				
Fricative	voiced	β	v	z	ʒ				ɦ
Fricative	prenasal			ⁿz					
Rhotic				r					
Lateral				l					
Approximant						j		w	

- [ŋ] mainly occurs as a sound of /n/, when preceding a velar consonant.

=== Vowels ===
Oral vowels
	Front	Central	Back
Close	i	ɨ	u
Mid	e	ə	o
Mid	ɛ		ɔ
Open		a	

Nasal vowels
	Front	Central	Back
Close	ĩ		ũ
Mid	ẽ		õ
Open		ã	
