= Bokoto language =

Gbaya language spoken in Central African Republic

Bokoto
- Bhogoto
- Ɓòkòtò
- Native to: Central African Republic
- Native speakers: (130,000 cited 1996)
- Language family: Niger–Congo?: Atlantic–Congo; Savannas; Gbaya; Western; Bokoto–Bozom; Bokoto

Language codes
- ISO 639-3: bdt
- Glottolog: boko1261

Bokoto (Bhogoto, Ɓòkòtò) is a Gbaya language of the Central African Republic.
