= Toongo language =

Gbaya language of the Central African Republic

Toongo
- Native to: Central African Republic
- Language family: Niger–Congo?: Atlantic–Congo; Savannas; Gbaya; Western; Toongo

Language codes
- ISO 639-3: (part of Southwest Gbaya [gso])
- Linguist List: gso-too
- Glottolog: None

Toongo (Tòòngò) is a Gbaya language of the Central African Republic. Its speakers identify as ethnically Buli, but the languages, though closely related, are distinct.
