= Ngbaka languages =

Language family

Ngbaka
- Mundu–Baka
- Geographic distribution: Central African Republic, Cameroon, Gabon, Republic of the Congo, Democratic Republic of the Congo, South Sudan
- Linguistic classification: Ubangian: Seri–Mba; Ngbaka–Mba; Ngbaka
- Subdivisions: Eastern; Western

Language codes
- ISO 639-3: –
- Glottolog: ngba1292

The dozen Ngbaka languages are a family of Ubangian languages spoken in the Central African Republic and neighboring areas. It includes Pygmy languages such as Baka and Gundi. The most populous Ngbaka languages are Mbaka in the western branch, spoken by a quarter million people, and Mayogo in the eastern branch, spoken by half that number.

Like the Mba languages, the Ngbaka languages are spoken across discontiguous areas scattered across various central African countries.

== Languages ==
Glottolog 3.4, following Winkhart (2015), gives the structure of the Baka-Mundu family as follows:

- Eastern
  - Mayogo–Bangba: Bangba, Mayogo
  - Mündü
- Western
  - Baka (Baka–Ganzi, Gundi, Limassa, Ngombe)
  - River Western
    - Mbaka / Bwaka (Ngbaka Ma'bo, Gilima)
    - Gbanzili (Gbanziri–Buraka)
    - Monzombo (Monzombo, Kpala–Yango)

The varieties listed for each may not be mutually intelligible.
