= Pambia language =

Zande language of DR Congo

Pambia
- Apambia
- Native to: Democratic Republic of the Congo
- Extinct: (date missing)
- Language family: Niger–Congo?: Zande; Barambo–Pambia; Pambia

Language codes
- ISO 639-3: pmb
- Glottolog: pamb1243

Pambia (Apambia) is an extinct Zande language spoken in the northeast of the Democratic Republic of the Congo.
