= Gbeya language =

Gbaya language spoken in Central Africa

Gbeya
- Native to: Central African Republic
- Native speakers: (ca. 250,000 cited 1996–2005)
- Language family: Niger–Congo?: Atlantic–Congo; Savannas; Gbaya; Western; Bokoto–Bozom; Gbeya

Language codes
- ISO 639-3: Either: gbp – Gbaya-Bossangoa sqm – Suma
- Glottolog: gbey1244 dekk1240

Gbeya (Gbɛ́yá, Gbaya-Bossangoa) is a Gbaya language of the Central African Republic. Ethnologue reports it may be mutually intelligible with Bozom.

Suma (Súmā) is a language variety closely related to Gbeya.

== Phonology ==
=== Consonants ===
		Labial	Alveolar	Palatal	Velar	Labialvelar	Glottal
Plosive	voiceless	p	t		k	k͡p	ʔ
Plosive	voiced	b	d		ɡ	ɡ͡b	
Plosive	prenasal	ᵐb	ⁿd		ᵑɡ	ᵑᵐɡ͡b	
Plosive	implosive	ɓ	ɗ				
Nasal	preglottal	ˀm	ˀn				
Nasal	plain	m	n		ŋ	ŋ͡m	
Fricative	voiceless	f	s				h
Fricative	voiced	v	z				
Lateral			l				
Tap/Flap		ⱱ	ɾ				
Approximant				j		w	

=== Vowels ===
	Front	Central	Back
Close	i		u
Close-mid	e		o
Open-mid	ɛ		ɔ
Open		a	
