= Archaeology of Central Africa =

An image depicting Central Africa. The countries highlighted in green are considered to be a part of Central Africa.

Central Africa is generally considered to encompass ten countries (Cameroon, south-Chad, Central African Republic (CAR), Equatorial Guinea, Republic of the Congo, Gabon, the Democratic Republic of the Congo (DRC), Rwanda, Burundi, Angola) which amounts to more than six million square kilometers or roughly the size of the United States west of the Mississippi River. Despite its large size, very little archaeological research has been done in the region.

== Research ==
Archaeological research has been scarce in Central Africa. One reason is that half of Central Africa is covered by rainforest. Because of this many archaeologists believed prehistoric occupation was improbable and, if there had been, preservation would be low. Because of the rainforest and the poverty in the area, infrastructure is underdeveloped, which makes traveling to possible sites difficult. Central Africa has also had high outbreaks of deadly diseases such as AIDS and Ebola fever, and has also experienced numerous "coups d'etat, prolonged civil wars, and even genocide." The first archaeological research was completed in the early 1900s. Modern studies began in the 1960s, and more systematic studies were completed from 1980-1990. The most recent research has focused on creating regional chronologies.

== Early habitation ==
Archaeologists questioned if humans could survive only on forest resources before the emergence of agriculture. Research done by Els Cornelissen et al suggests that occupation was possible before agriculture and may have actually been very hospitable. Because of the ecodiversity of the area, the people inhabiting the area would have had access to a variety of resources, making it a more stable environment to live in.

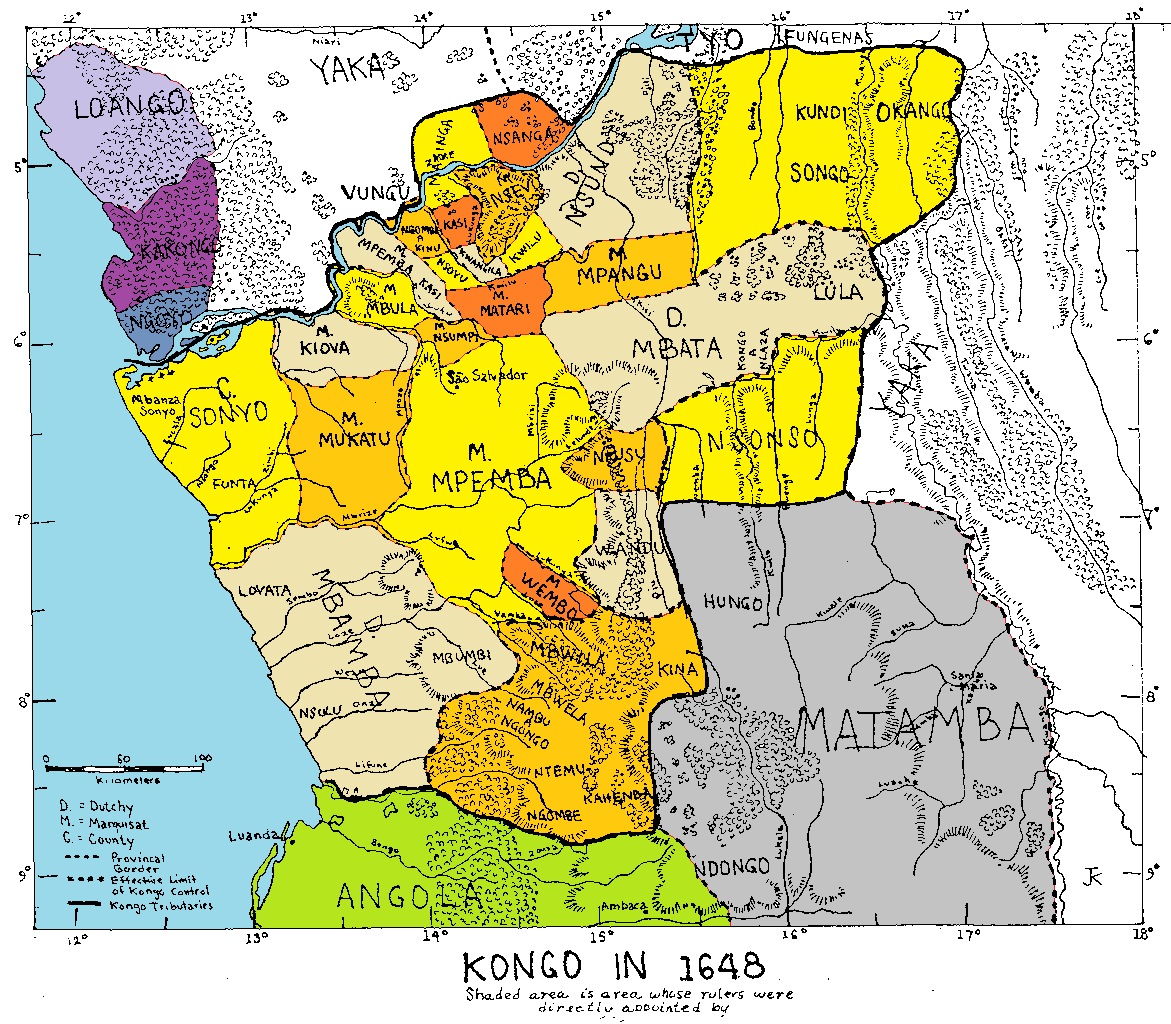
The area colored in light purple is the general area where Denbow researched.

Evidence of some of the earliest inhabitants was found in 1982 and 1983 by J. Preuss at Bikoro in the Democratic Republic of the Congo. Preuss found a number of stone artifacts including projectile points, "segments, cores, flakes, and unmodified waste". These artifacts would have been used by hunter-gatherers and are estimated to have been made during the Late Stone Age between 12,000-3,000 years BP.

More research in the 1980s found picks, choppers and, hand-axes representative of the Middle Stone Age. Clist argues that these tools could be 40,000 years old, meaning humans have been occupying the area for at least 40,000 years.

James Denbow recently excavated and dated sites on the Loango Coast between Gabon and Cabinda. He dated sites only as early as approximately 3250 BP- 2050 BP. These 10 sites "produced only lithic debris... were very small and contained concentrations of chert flakes and fragments."

=== Gray Sand ===
Gray Sand is a pre-ceramic Later Stone Age (LSA) site that is located 10 kilometers north of the mouth of the Kouilou River. This site dates to approximately 3342-2888 BP. This site was a non-ceramic LSA site where archaeologists recovered "42 chert and 265 quartzite flakes and fragments [but] no formal stone tools..." The quartzite could be locally found but the chert could have only been found approximately 50 kilometers east in the Mayombe Mountains. Chert made up almost 14 percent of lithics found at the site which indicates that people living at Gray Sand had interactions or territories as far as the Mayombe Mountains. Later lithic material, from approximately 2461-2147 BP, was found in the stratigraphy above the LSA lithics which showed a preference for local quartzite.

== Transition to Iron Age ==
The Late Stone age in Central Africa ended approximately 3,500 years ago. By 3500 - 3000 years BP, the climate and the environment had changed as well as the peoples and practices of peoples inhabiting the region. A shift from rainforest to savanna created an opportune environment for farming.

Oslisly et al suggest that by approximately 3500 BP the hunter gatherers living in Central Africa were pushed out by agricultural migrants from the north. These early agriculturalists are differentiated by dug garbage pits which differs from waste practices of earlier inhabitants. During the Neolithic phase, 3500–2000 years BP, "new technologies such as pottery and stone polishing" developed and were mastered. The presence of stone hoes indicates that the new inhabitants were farming.

A debate has emerged as to whether the vegetation change occurring at the time was due to climate change or agricultural practices. Because the vegetation change was contemporaneous with the Bantu Expansion, or "the migration of Bantu-speaking farmers across Central Africa," the chronology could be correct.

=== Akonétye ===
Akonétye is a small village in Southern Cameroon where, beginning in 2004, Conny Meister and Manfred Eggert excavated sites. There are two sites, one to the north of the modern city of Akonétye, called the northern site, and one to the south of the modern city, called the southern site. At the southern site, Meister and Eggert believe they have found the oldest graves containing iron in Central Africa.

==== Southern Site ====
Radiocarbon dates place the excavated pits in the southern site to the "first half of the first millennium AD." At the southern site, Meister and Eggert found what is believed to be the oldest graves containing iron in Central Africa. In feature AKO 05/6 no skeletal material was found, but the "content as well as the content's arrangement suggested that they are graves. This interpretation is supported by the discovery of bone residue during the preparation and conservation of the iron bracelets." Feature AKO 05/2, yielded "three almost complete ceramic vessels, several iron bracelets and two socketed iron hoes, both of which [were] decorated." No skeletal remains were found at this feature either, however, decomposed bone material was again found. Meister and Eggert also believe that this was a grave. The third and final grave was discovered in feature AKO 05/6. This grave was marked by "intentionally deposited, party worked stones" and inside three pots and iron offerings, including an iron spoon, double- diamond shaped iron objects, were found. Also found were iron bracelets, and an iron axe and hoe.

== The Later Iron Age and Historic Period ==
There is a gap in the archaeological record between the Early Iron Age and the Later Iron Age, from about 1050 - 850 years BP. The time after the Early Iron Age can be broken into "two broad categories based on vessel shape, decoration, and the presence or absence of European trade groups."The first of the two categories will be referred to as Phase 1 Later Iron Age which dates from approximately 850 - 450 years BP. The second of the two categories will be referred to as Phase 2 Later Iron Age: The Historic Period, which dates from about 450 - 50 years BP.

=== Phase 1 Later Iron Age ===
Very few sites could be definitely dated to Phase 1 of the Later Iron Age. Denbow suggests that this could be due to population patterns shifting from "dispersed, small settlements during the Early Iron Age to a more centralized pattern in which small villages coalesced into larger towns."

==== Loubanzi ====
Loubanzi is a large Phase 1 Later Iron Age site that has dated to approximately 535 - 317 years BP, the date was supported by the fact that no European trade goods were found at the site. One possible scenario, suggested by Denbow, is that Loubanzi "was an early ward or precinct on the outskirts of the larger settlement of Bouali (Bwali), the capital of the Loango kingdom described in the sixteenth and seventeenth centuries." Ceramics shaped like chamber pots, as well quartzite and chert, oyster shells and fragments of iron were recovered from the site.

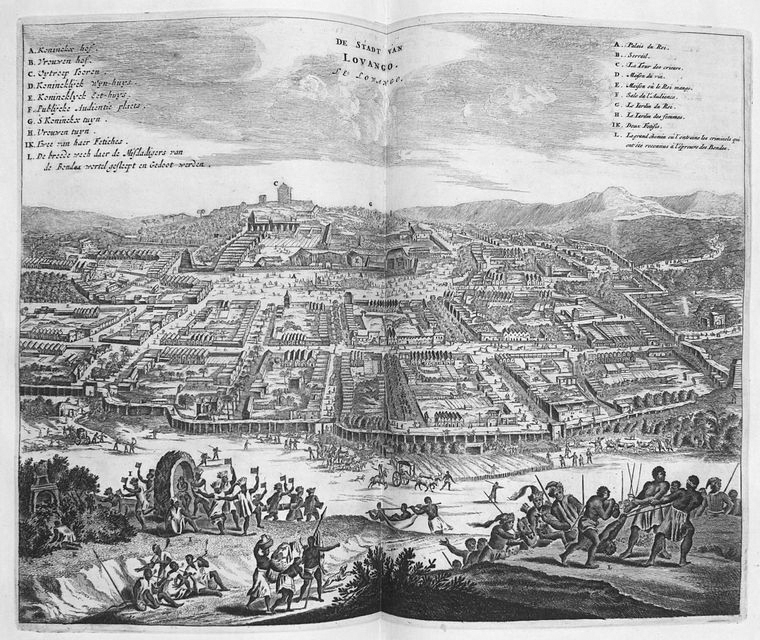
An artist's depiction of Bwali. This image may be inaccurate as the artist never visited the city.

=== Phase 2 Later Iron Age: Historic Period ===
Very few actual excavations have been done on Phase 2 Later Iron Age Sites, mostly only surface reconnaissance. Indigenous ceramics with woven motifs were found in association with European porcelain and earthenware. Historical records from Peter Van den Broecke, a Dutch cloth trader, and Andrew Battell, "a long-term resident of Loango," both describe the capital city of Bwali. Van den Broecke described Bwali as "lying close to the show and surrounded by a wall." Battell describes Bwali as having a "royal compound separated from the rest of the town, a royal court where war and other matters of national import were deliberated, and a great market."
