= Banda languages =

Language family

Banda
- Geographic distribution: Central African Republic, Democratic Republic of the Congo, South Sudan
- Ethnicity: Banda people
- Linguistic classification: Niger–Congo?: Atlantic–Congo; Volta–Congo; Savanna?; Ubangian; Banda
- Subdivisions: Central; South; Mbandja; Ngbundu; West

Language codes
- ISO 639-2 / 5: bad
- ISO 639-3: –
- Glottolog: band1341

Banda is a family of Ubangian languages spoken by the Banda people of Central Africa. Banda languages are distributed in the Central African Republic, Democratic Republic of the Congo, and South Sudan.

== Languages ==
=== Olson (1996) ===
Olson (1996) classifies the Banda family as follows (Ethnologue 16 employs this classification):

- Central
  - Central Banda (a dialect cluster, incl. Mono)
  - Yangere
- South Banda (SC)
- Mbandja (S)
- Ngbundu (SW)
- West Banda (WC)

=== Moñino (1988) ===
A comprehensive list of Banda languages and dialects listed in Moñino (1988) is provided as follows. All of them are spoken in the Central African Republic unless otherwise noted in parentheses, since some Banda languages and dialects are also spoken in the DR Congo and South Sudan.

Banda

- Central (39 languages)
  - Yakpà (also in DR Congo), Gubú (also in DR Congo), Kpágùà (also in DR Congo), Ngùndù, Bòngò, Wasá (also in South Sudan), Dùkpù (also in South Sudan)
  - Lìndá, Jòtò, Ndòkpà, Ngápó
  - Southern Gbàgà, Nbìyì, Bèrèyà, Ngòlà, Ndi, Kâ, Gbambiya, Hàì, Galabò, Vídìrì (Mvédèrè) (also in South Sudan), Bàndà-Bàndà, Burú (only in South Sudan), Wùndù (only in South Sudan), Gòv̂òrò (only in South Sudan)
  - Bàndà-Ndele, Bàndà-Kpaya (only in South Sudan), Ngàò, Ngbalá, Tàngbàgò (also in South Sudan), Júnguru (also in South Sudan)
  - Mbere, Búkà, Mòrùbà, Sàbángà, Wádà (also in South Sudan)
  - Vàrà (also in South Sudan), Tògbò (also in South Sudan)
  - Yàngere
- Peripheral (11 languages)
  - West Central: Dákpá, Gbî, Northern Gbàgà, Wójò
  - South Central: Làngabàsi (or Làngbàsi) (also in DR Congo), Ngbúgù, Làngbà
  - Central: Mbanza (also in DR Congo), Mbanja (only in DR Congo)
  - Southwestern: Ngbùndù (also in DR Congo), Kpala (only in DR Congo)

Banda-Ndélé groups are Govo, Ngàjà, Gbòngó, Mbàtá, Gbàyà, Tulu, and Dabùrù (Moñino 1988).

== Central Sudanic influences ==
The Banda languages have a Bongo-Bagirmi substratum (Cloarec-Heiss 1995, 1998). Central Sudanic, particularly Bongo-Bagirmi, influence is evident in Banda phonology, morphosyntax, and lexicon (including cultural vocabulary, and names for flora and fauna). Many of these influences are absent in other Ubangian language groups.
