= Zande language =

Language spoken in Central Africa

Zande
- Pazande
- Native to: Democratic Republic of the Congo, Central African Republic, South Sudan
- Ethnicity: Zande
- Speakers: (L1: 1.8 million cited 1996–2017); L2: 100,000 (2013)
- Language family: Niger–Congo?: Atlantic-Congo; Volta-Congo; Savannas?; Ubangian; Zande languages; Zande–Nzakara; Zande
- Dialects: Dio; Makaraka
- Writing system: Latin

Language codes
- ISO 639-3: zne
- Glottolog: zand1248

Zande is the largest of the Zande languages. It is spoken by the Azande, primarily in the northeast of the Democratic Republic of the Congo and western South Sudan, but also in the eastern part of the Central African Republic. It is called Pazande in the Zande language and Kizande in Lingala.

Estimates about the number of speakers vary; in 2001 Koen Impens cited studies that put the number between 700,000 and one million.

== Phonology ==
=== Consonants ===
		Labial	Alveolar	Retroflex	Palatal	Velar	Labio- velar
Nasal		m	n		ɲ		
Plosive	voiceless	p	t			k	k͡p
Plosive	prenasal	ᵐb	ⁿd			ᵑɡ	ᵑɡ͡b
Plosive	voiced	b	d			ɡ	ɡ͡b
Fricative	voiceless	f	s				
Fricative	prenasal	ᶬv	ⁿz				
Fricative	voiced	v	z				
Rhotic			r ~ ɽ				
Approximant					j		w

- Alveolar sounds /d, z, ⁿz, s, t, ⁿd/ have allophones as palato-alveolar sounds [d͡ʒ, ʒ, ⁿʒ, ʃ, t͡ʃ, ⁿd͡ʒ] when preceding /i/.
- The retroflex tap /ɽ/ can be heard as an alveolar trill [r] in free variation.

=== Vowels ===
Oral and Nasal vowels
	Front		Back			
	Front		unrounded		rounded	
Close	i	ĩ			u	ũ
Near-close	ɪ	ɪ̃			ʊ	ʊ̃
Close-mid	e	ẽ			o	õ
Open-mid	ɛ	ɛ̃	ʌ	ʌ̃	ɔ	ɔ̃
Open			a	ã		

== Writing system ==
Zande spelling rules were established at the 1928 Rejaf Language Conference following the principles of the International African Institute.

Zande alphabet of Gore 1931
a	b	d	e	f	g	i	k	m	n	o	ö	p	s	t	u	v	w	y	z

Nasalized vowels are indicated using the tilde : ⟨ã ẽ ĩ õ ũ⟩. Consonants with double articulation are represented by digraphs: ⟨gb kp mv nv ny⟩.

In 1959, Archibald Norman Tucker published a Zande alphabet proposed during the Bangenzi Conference of 1941.

Zande alphabet of Tucker 1959
a	ä	b	d	e	f	g	h	i	i̧	k	m	n	o	p	r	s	t	u	u̧	v	w	y	z	’

Nasalized vowels are indicated using the tilde : ã ẽ ĩ ĩ̧ õ ũ ũ̧ r̃. Consonants with double articulation are represented by digraphs or trigraphs : kp gb ny mb nv nd nz ng ngb mgb

SIL International published a Zande alphabet in 2014.

Zande alphabet (SIL)
a	ə	b	d	e	f	g	gb	h	i	ɨ	k	kp	l	m	mb	n	nd	ngb	nv	ny	nz	o	p	s	t	u	ʉ	v	w	y	z

== Sample text in Zande (Jehovah's Witnesses) ==
Avunguagudee, oni nangarasa rukutu awironi na gu sosono yo i mangi agu asunge dunduko na ngbarago i afuhe fuyo i mangihe, singia si tii Bambu Kindo yo, watadu ba bakere adunguratise yo?

Translation

Parents, do you encourage your children and teenagers to work cheerfully at any assignment that they are given to do, whether at the Kingdom Hall, at an assembly, or at a convention site?

== Morphology ==
=== Pronouns ===
==== Personal pronouns ====
	Subject	Object
I/me	mi	re
you (sg.), thou/thee	mo	ro
he/him	ko	ko
she/her	ro	ri
he/she (indef.), him/her	ni	ni
we/us	ani	rani
you (plural)	oni	roni
they/them	i/yo	yo

==== Animal pronouns ====
	Subject	Object
it	u	ru
they/them	ru	ra

The objective forms of these pronouns are regularly used as suffixes denoting the first or intimate form of the genitive. Those nouns which end in se drop this syllable before the suffixed pronoun. For instance,

- boro 'person' > borore 'my body'
- ngbaduse 'chest' > ngbadure 'my chest'
- kpu 'home' > kpuro 'thy home'

==== Possessive pronouns ====
	Singular
mine	gimi
yours (sg.), thine	gamo
his	gako
hers	gari
his/hers (indef.)	gani

	Plural
its (animal)	gau
its (neuter)	gaa
ours	gaani
yours	gaoni
theirs	gayo
theirs (animal)	gaami

Possessive pronouns can be used as reflexive pronouns. For instance,

- Mi ye ti gimi. 'I have come myself.'
- A ndu ti gani. 'Let us go ourselves.'

==== Reflexive pronouns ====
	Singular
myself	tire
yourself (sg.), thyself	tiro
himself	tiko
herself	tiri
itself (animal)	tiru
itself (neuter)	tie

	Plural
ourselves	tirani
yourselves	tironi
themselves	tiyo
themselves	tira

For example, Mi a mangi e ni tire. 'I did it by myself.'

=== Nouns ===
Pluralising a noun in Zande is typically done by adding the prefix a before the stem.

- boro 'person' > aboro 'people'
- nya 'beast' > anya 'beasts'
- e 'thing' > ae 'things'

=== Verbs ===
Verbs often change tense by adding the corresponding tense marker. For instance:

- mi na manga 'I am doing' (tense marker, temple auxiliary)
- mi a manga 'I do' (tense marker, temple auxiliary)'

The verb does not change with their subject (pro)noun. For instance

- mi na manga 'I am doing'
- mo na manga 'thou art doing'
- ko na manga '(s)he is doing'
- ani na manga 'we are doing'
- oni na manga 'you are doing'
- i na manga 'they are doing'

Verbal negation is expressed by placing nga after the verb and then ending the negative statement with the particle te or ya at the end of the sentence.

Negative auxiliaries are separated to enclose subordinate clauses contained in the main negative statement, so affirmative verbs can usually be surrounded by them.

Verb + nga…te/ya (te/ya is placed at the end of the entire sentence)

The indicative 'nga... te'

The Imperative 'nga...ya'

For example,

- Mi a manga a. 'I do it.'
- Mi a manga nga a te. 'I do not do it.'
- Ka mo ni mangi nga a ya. 'Do not do it.'

=== Numbers ===
The traditional Zande numerical system is based on finger and toe (i.e. digit) counting, which lacks a full set of discrete number words beyond 10 or 20 – such numbers are expressed descriptively, often with additive constructions.

==== Basic numerals ====
- sa 'one'
- ue 'two'
- biata 'three'
- biama 'four'
- bisue 'five'
- bawe 'ten'
- ira 'fifteen'

==== Additive constructions ====
When the number exceeds five, it is transferred to the other hand to continue counting, using additive operations that builds upon basic/core numerals, with the use of the verbial constructions bati (lit. 'to step over') for 6–9, bati/yari sende yo (lit. 'to step over from below') for 11–14, and yari ku bani (lit. 'to step over to the other side') for 16–19.

The standalone numeral 20 is expressed as boro ru e (lit. 'a person stands it'), since a person's hands and feet add up to 20 digits. 30 and 40 are expressed as 20+10 and 20+20, respectively. 20 is expressed as ue bawe ('two ten', 2*10) if it is part of a larger number.

6–9

- bisue bati sa 'six' (lit. 'five over one')
- bisue bati ue 'seven' (lit. 'five over two')
- bisue bati biata 'eight' (lit. 'five over three')
- bisue bati biama 'nine' (lit. 'five over four')

11–14

- bawe bati/yari sende yo sa 'eleven' (lit. 'ten over one')
- bawe bati/yari sende yo ue 'twelve' (lit. 'ten over two')
- bawe bati/yari sende yo biata 'thirteen' (lit. 'ten over three')
- bawe bati/yari sende yo biama 'fourteen' (lit. 'ten over four')

16–19

- ira yari ku bani sa 'sixteen' (lit. 'fifteen over one')
- ira yari ku bani ue 'seventeen' (lit. 'fifteen over two')
- ira yari ku bani biata 'eighteen' (lit. 'fifteen over three')
- ira yari ku bani biama 'nineteen' (lit. 'fifteen over four')

21–29

For numerals 21–29, the verbial constructions zi be (lit. 'taken by the arm') or yari ku bani are used.

For instance, boro ru e zi be sa and boro ru e yari ku bani sa both mean 'twenty-one'.

Larger numbers

- 100 – kama ('hundred')
- 120 – kama na ue bawe (lit. '[one] hundred and twenty')
- 200 – ue kama
- 1,000 – kuti ('thousand')
- 2,000 – ue kuti
- 1,000,000 – mirioni ('million', itself borrowed from French)

== Morphosyntax ==
=== Word Order ===
S + V + O

Mi nga gude -> 'I am a boy'

mi -> 'I', nga -> 'am', (to be), gude -> 'boy'

=== The order of possessor noun-possessed noun in relation ===
bami -> 'my father'

(ba -> 'father', mi -> 'my')

possessed noun needs to add a suffix (objective pronoun form) to express what it is belonged to whom.

kporo -> 'a village' (abbr. Kpu)

kpure -> 'my home', kpuro -> 'thy home', kpuko -> 'his home'

before a noun is becomes KU

ku kuma ->'a man’s home' (kuma -> 'man', ku -> 'home')

ku Gangura -> 'Gangura’s home'

=== The order of demonstrative-noun in relation ===
Demonstrative Adjectives

gere -> 'this', gi…re agi…re -> 'these' (plural)

gure -> 'that', gu…re. agu…re -> 'those' (plural)

Mo fu gere fe re -> 'give me this'

Mo di gure -> 'take this'

When they are used with noun pronouns, the syllables need to be separated so that they surround the noun pronoun and sometimes include the entire clause that modifies the noun pronoun.

gi boro re -> 'this person'

gi ko re -> 'this man'

agi aboro re -> 'these people'

agi yo re -> 'these people' (lit. these they)

agu bambu re -> 'those house' (bambu -> 'house')

=== The order of numeral-noun in relation ===
the number add always behind the noun and the noun usually uses its singular form

For instance,

sape bisue -> 'five knives'

=== The serial verb constructions with "ki" ===
Eg1. Yesu ki bi yo i ni pe ko -> 'Jesus saw them following him.'

(bi -> 'saw', yo -> 'them', i ni pe -> 'following', ko -> 'him')

Eg2. Mi a ndu ki bo ko -> 'I went and saw him.'

Eg3. Ko a ndu ki mangi e ki yega -> 'He went and did it and came home.'

=== Forming a comparative construction ===
wa -> 'like' it is usually put before the adjective

  - eg. Ga ango ni kikii ru wa kina gimi ru -> 'Your dog is a big one just like mine.'

ti -> 'than' it is usually put after the adjective

  - eg. Ga gu kuma bambu re ngba ti gamo -> 'That man’s house is better that yours.'

susa (i) -> to surpass

  - Ga roko bakere susi gimi? -> 'Is your cloth bigger than mine?'
