= West Banda language =

Ubangian language spoken in Central Africa

West Banda
- Golo
- Native to: Central African Republic, South Sudan
- Native speakers: (7,500 cited 1982–1996)
- Language family: Ubangian: Banda; West Banda

Language codes
- ISO 639-3: bbp
- Glottolog: west2458

West Banda is a minor Banda language, spoken by 10,000 or so people.

== Dialects ==
Dialects are Dakpa, Gbaga-Nord (Gbaga-2), Gbi, Vita, and Wojo (Hodjo), as reported by Ethnologue and Moñino (1988).

Dákpá speakers live in some villages near the Sara people of Nyango; clans are Yangbà and Dèkò.

== Phonology ==
=== Consonants ===
		Bilabial	Labio- dental	Dental	Alveolar	Post- alveolar	Palatal	Velar	Labial- velar	Glottal
Plosive	voiceless	p		t			c	k	kp	ʔ
Plosive	voiced						ɟ	ɡ	ɡb	
Plosive	prenasalized	ᵐb		ⁿd			ᶮɟ	ᵑɡ	ᵑᵐɡb	
Fricative	voiceless		f		s	ʃ				h
Fricative	voiced		v		z	ʒ				
Fricative	prenasalized		ᶬv		ⁿz					
Nasal		m		n			ɲ		ŋm	
Tap/Flap			ⱱ	ɾ						
Lateral					l					
Approximant							j		w	

=== Vowels ===
	Front	Mid	Back
Close	i	ɨ	u
Close-mid	e		o
Mid		ə	
Open-mid			ɔ
Open		a	

Vowel tones in West Banda are rising /ǎ/, falling /â/, mid /ā/, low /à/, and high /á/.
