= Zande languages =

Languages of Africa

Zande
- Zandic
- Geographic distribution: Central African Republic, Democratic Republic of the Congo, South Sudan
- Linguistic classification: Niger–Congo?: Atlantic–Congo; Volta–Congo; Savannas?; Ubangian?; Zande
- Subdivisions: Barambo–Pambia; Zande–Nzakara

Language codes
- ISO 639-2 / 5: znd
- Glottolog: zand1246

The Zande languages are half a dozen closely related languages of the Central African Republic, the Democratic Republic of the Congo, and South Sudan. The most populous language is Zande proper, with over a million speakers.

== Languages ==
Per Boyd (1988), the structure of the family is as follows:

- Barambo–Pambia: Barambu, Pambia, Ngala
- Zande–Nzakara: Geme, Nzakara, Zande

== Classification ==
Zande is traditionally included among the Ubangian languages, although Moñino (2010) does not group it within Ubangian. It is not clear if it is a member of the Niger–Congo family, or where it might be in that family.

== Morphology ==
=== The Verb ===
Verbs often change tense by adding the corresponding tense marker. For instance:

- mi na manga = I am doing (tense marker, temple auxiliary)
- mi a manga = I do (tense marker, temple auxiliary)

Besides, the verb will not change with their subject nouns. For instance

- mi na manga = I am doing
- mo na manga = Thou are doing
- ko na manga = He (she) is doing
- ani na manga = We are doing
- oni na manga = You are doing
- i na manga = They are doing

=== The Adjective ===
Zande language has adjectives. The adjectives are always placed after the word they modify.

=== The Noun ===
Pluralising a noun in Zande language is often done by adding "a" before a singular noun. For instance:

- boro=a person aboro=people
- nya=a beast anya=beasts
- e=a thing ae=things

=== The Number ===
The Zande have a more limited method of counting, never exceeding the numbers 20 and 40. Usually Zande people count by counting fingers and toes. Therefore when a number over twenty is counted another person must count the number beyond twenty and so on. So all the numbers over twenty or over ten are not separate numbers but are described in a sentence.

==== The system of 1-5 ====
sa=1 ue=2 biata=3 biama=4 bisue=5
