= Bofi language =

Gbaya language of the CAR

Bofi
- Ɓòfì
- Native to: Central African Republic
- Ethnicity: include Mbenga (perhaps Baka)
- Native speakers: (24,000 cited 1996)
- Language family: Niger–Congo?: Atlantic–Congo; Savannas; Gbaya; Eastern; Mbodomo–Bofi; Bofi

Language codes
- ISO 639-3: bff
- Glottolog: bofi1238

Bofi (Ɓòfì, Boffi) is a Gbaya language spoken in Boda and Bimbo subprefectures in southwestern Central African Republic. Those speakers in Bimbo are mostly Bambenga pygmies. Although they no longer live in the forest, their area was forested in 1950.
