= Mbaka language =

Language spoken by the Mbaka people of CAR and Congo

Mbaka
- Ngbaka Ma'bo
- Native to: CAR, Republic of Congo
- Ethnicity: M'Baka
- Native speakers: (200,000 cited 1984–2000)
- Language family: Ubangian: Sere–Mba; Ngbaka; Western; Mbaka

Language codes
- ISO 639-3: Either: nbm – Ngbaka Ma’bo gix – Gilima
- Glottolog: bwak1244

The Mbaka or Bwaka language, Ngbaka Ma'bo (also called Gbaka, Ma'bo, Ngbwaka, Ngbaka Limba) is a major Ubangian language spoken by the Mbaka people of CAR and Congo.

It is not clear how distinct the Gilima variety is, or whether it should be considered a separate language. It does have its own ISO 639-3 code.

== Phonology ==
=== Consonants ===
		Labial	Dental/ Alveolar	Palatal	Velar		Glottal
		Labial	Dental/ Alveolar	Palatal	plain	lab.	Glottal
Nasal		m	n	ɲ			
Plosive/ Affricate	voiceless	p	t		k	k͡p	ʔ
Plosive/ Affricate	voiced	b	d		ɡ	ɡ͡b	
Plosive/ Affricate	prenasal	ᵐb	ⁿd		ᵑɡ	ᵑᵐɡ͡b	
Plosive/ Affricate	implosive	ɓ					
Fricative	voiceless	f	s				h
Fricative	voiced	v	z				
Fricative	prenasal		ⁿz				
Approximant			l	j	w		

=== Vowels ===
	Front	Central	Back
Close	i (ĩ)		u (ũ)
Close-mid	e ẽ		o õ
Open-mid	ɛ		ɔ
Open		a ã	
