= Mbodomo language =

Savannas language spoken in Cameroon

Mbodomo
- Mbódɔ̀mɔ̀
- Native to: Cameroon
- Native speakers: (8,000 cited 1992)
- Language family: Niger–Congo?: Atlantic–Congo; Savannas; Gbaya; Eastern; Mbodomo–Bofi; Mbodomo

Language codes
- ISO 639-3: gmm
- Glottolog: gbay1281

Mbodomo (Mbódɔ̀mɔ̀, Gbaya-Mbodomo) is a Gbaya language of Cameroon.
