= Manza language =

Ubangian language of the CAR

Manza
- Mandja
- Native to: Central African Republic
- Ethnicity: Mandja
- Native speakers: (220,000 cited 1996)
- Language family: Niger–Congo?: Atlantic–Congo; Savannas; Gbaya; Eastern; Gbanu–Ngbaka; Manza; Manza

Language codes
- ISO 639-3: mzv
- Glottolog: manz1243

Manza (Mānzā, Mandja) is a Ubangian language spoken by the Mandja people of the Central African Republic. It is closely related to Ngbaka and may be to some extent mutually intelligible.

== Phonology ==
The phonology consists of the following:

=== Consonants ===
		Labial	Alveolar	Palatal	Velar	Labio- velar	Glottal
Nasal		m	n	(ɲ)	ŋ	ŋ͡m	
Plosive	voiceless	p	t		k	k͡p	
Plosive	voiced	b	d		ɡ	ɡ͡b	
Plosive	prenasal	ᵐb	ⁿd		ᵑɡ	ᵑᵐɡ͡b	
Plosive	implosive	ɓ	ɗ				
Fricative	voiceless	f	s				h
Fricative	voiced	v	z				
Fricative	prenasal		ⁿz				
Tap		ⱱ	ɾ				
Approximant			(l)	j		w	

- Sounds /ɾ/ and /ⱱ/ are very rare in word-initial position.
- /ⁿz/ can be heard in free variation as a prenasal affricate sound [ⁿd͡ʒ].
- [l] is only heard in free variation of /j/.
- /j/ can be heard as [ɲ] when preceding a nasal vowel.

=== Vowels ===
Oral vowels
	Front	Central	Back
Close	i		u
Close-mid	e		o
Open-mid	ɛ		ɔ
Open		a	

- /a/ can have an allophone of [ɐ], when in complementary distribution.

Nasal vowels
	Front	Central	Back
Close	ĩ		ũ
Open-mid	ɛ̃		ɔ̃
Open		ã	

- The nasalization of /ɛ̃/ may also be heard more lower as [æ̃] in free variation.

== Writing system ==
Manza alphabet
a	b	bh	d	dh	e	ɛ	f	g	gb	h	i	k	kp	l	m	mb	n	nd	ndj	ngb	ŋ	ŋg	ŋm	o	ɔ	p	r	s	t	u	v	vb	w	y	z

The tones are indicated on the letters using diacritics:

- the middle tone is indicated using the umlaut: ⟨ä, ë, ɛ̈, ï, ö, ɔ̈, ü⟩ ;
- the high tone is indicated using the circumflex accent: ⟨â, ê, ɛ̂, î, ô, ɔ̂, û⟩.
