= Atoroba Peni Rikito =

Restored Azande monarch in South Sudan (r. 2022–present)

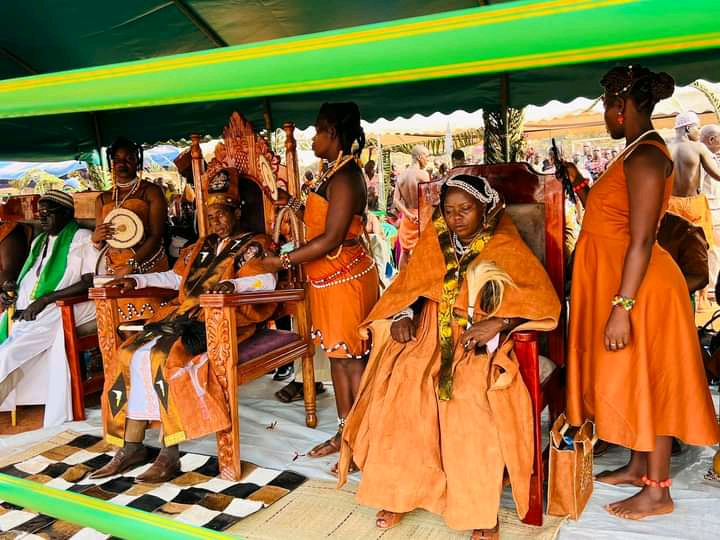

King of Azande Kingdom
- Reign: 9 February 2022 – present
- Predecessor: Monarchy restored (Gbudwe in 1905)
- Born: Yambio
- Dynasty: Avongara

Atoroba Peni Rikito is the great-grandson of King Gbudwe who became the King of Azande on 9 February 2022.

== Ascension ==
Atoroba Peni Rikito became King of the Azande Kingdom. The kingdom had not had a king for 117 years, since the death of Gbudwe in 1905.

The Azande Kingdom is dominated by the Azande people, located Western Equatoria State of South Sudan. Its royal seat or capital is based in Yambio, which is also the state capital of Western Equatoria State.
