= South Stone Airlines =

South Sudanese airline company

- Founded: 2016
- Operating bases: Juba International Airport
- Focus cities: Juba
- Fleet size: 1
- Headquarters: Juba, South Sudan

South Stone Airlines was a privately owned passenger charter airline in South Sudan, which was founded in 2016.

== Location ==
The airline maintained its headquarters in the city of Juba, the capital of South Sudan.

== History ==
South Stone Airlines was established in 2016. As of January 2026, the airline is listed as "Out of Business".

== Destinations ==
As of October 2019, South Stone Airlines served the following destinations:

- South Sudan
  - Juba: Juba International Airport (main hub)
  - Yambio: Yambio Airport

== Fleet ==
The South Stone Airlines fleet consisted of the following aircraft as of April 2016.

South Stone Airlines fleet
Aircraft	In fleet	Order	Passengers	Notes
Antonov An-30A-100	1	0	30	
Total	1	0		

== Accidents and incidents ==
On Saturday 4 June 2016, an Antonov An-30A-100 registration TN-AHP, owned by South Stone Airlines, landed at Yambio Airport, overshot the runway, crossed the highway and came to a stop in a potato field. The nose landing gear collapsed and the aircraft received substantial damage. All 30 occupants survived.

== See also ==
- List of airlines of South Sudan
