= Ture (Zande character) =

Trickster in Zande folklore

Ture is a character in the folklore of the Zande people of North Central Africa. A trickster figure, he is "the chief character in Zande folktales", in which he employs what among the Azande is called sanza, or speech with a double meaning. According to E. E. Evans-Pritchard, who collected and published a number of Zande stories, most of them involve Ture.

In one Zande animal story, he is named in a short song as someone who might call a child to entice it away from her mother.

He is also named in a proverb: ba iwafu ture a du sa, "Ture...had only one operator of the rubbing-board oracle". This is glossed as, "A man has only one real friend among so many acquaintances, who is the one who helps him. There are not many people who would help a man. There are very few who would help him."

== List of tales ==
- "How Ture Killed Bigtooth"
- "Ture and Yangaimo"
- "The Running of Ture and One-Leg"
- "The Fathers of Ture who were Bambasi and Bangirimo"
- "How Ture Killed His Father"
- "Ture and Bakureako"
- "Ture and Duwainga"
- "How Ture Burnt Leopard All Over" (in which Leopard consults a poison oracle)
- "Ture, the Youth, the Old Woman, and the Ripe Fruit"
- "About Ture, a Shield, and a Man and His Sister"
- "Ture and a Man's Fish"
- "Ture, Frog, and the River Baku"
- "Ture and Man-Killer Again"
- "Eye-Bees and Big-Eared Men"
- "Ture and Eye-Bee"
- "How Ture Fought with Nzangirinza"

== Publications ==
A collection of Zande stories about Ture, and the most important source of them, Sangba Ture, was published by the missionary Mrs. Edward Clive Gore in 1921, and republished in either 1951 or 1954 (by Canon Riley); the first and revised editions were published by the Sheldon Press in London. Mrs. Gore and her husband were with the Church Mission Society, which had a station in Yambio. According to Evans-Pritchard, many of the tales in her collection were written down by a Zande at a nearby Catholic mission, and then loaned to a Major Larken, a district commissioner for the British Colonial Service, who in turn gave them to Gore. The foreword to the collection was written by Enoka Mangbondo, who may also be responsible for the other stories in the collection. They were, according to Evans-Pritchard, all recorded before 1921 in the Sudan.

== Bibliography ==
- Gore, Mrs. Edward Clive (1931). Sangba Ture: Zande folk-lore. Sheldon Press. Rev. ed. 1954.
- Gore, Mrs. Edward Clive (1931). Pa Rika Anya na Asanza. Rev. ed. (edited by G. Riley) 1951.
