= Doruma =

Ndoromo (Doruma)
- Town
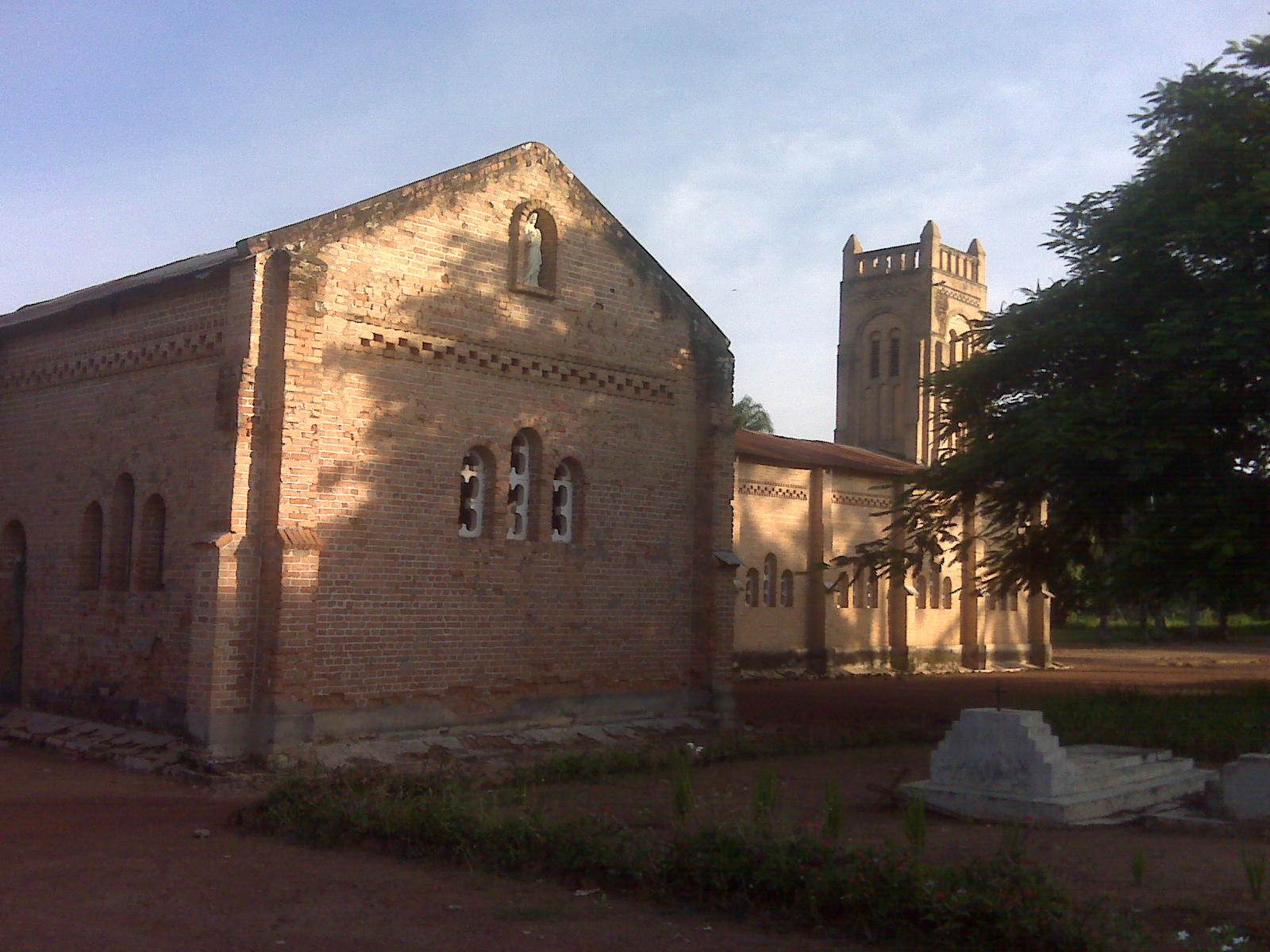
- The church in Ndoromo, home to the Roman Catholic Diocese of Ndoromo–Dungu.

- Location in Democratic Republic of the Congo
- Coordinates: 4°44′N 27°42′E
- Country: Democratic Republic of the Congo
- Province: Haut-Uele
- Established: 1800's

Population (2005)
  - Total: 18,000 (inhabitants & IDPs)
- Climate: Aw
- National language: Pa-Zande (Zande language) and Lingala

Ndoromo is a city in the northeastern regions of the Haut-Uele Province in the Democratic Republic of the Congo, adjacent to the border with South Sudan.

== History ==
The origin of the name Ndoromo comes from the name Ndoromo or Ndolomo, which is the name of the Azande King who ruled the people in that area prior to the arrival of the Belgian colonialists. Ndoromo is known for its natural vegetations, especially its thick forests, exotic wild animals and birds. The town is a major supplier of palm oil to nearby towns; such as Ezo, Nzara, Sakure and Yambio. Ndoromo is also known for its fragrance rice and delicious oranged-coloured mushrooms which the locals call 'Rute-Mbiro'.

== War ==
During the later part of December 1990, Ndoromo became a hosting town for Sudanese refugees who were fleeing a civil war, which had reached the Sudanese towns of Maridi, Yambio, Ezo, and Tombura. In 1992, the UNHCR in agreement with the Prince of Ndoromo and other governmental authority opened the Nambasa Refugees Camp. This camp was situated some several kilometres southward of Ndoromo town, and it remained opened until October 1998, when the then-rebels of Sudan, SPLA, took advantage of the war that was going on in the Democratic Republic of the Congo (DRC) at the time and entered both the Ndoromo and Dungu towns.

The SPLA faced little resistance as most of the AFDL soldiers had been transported to the battle front lines such as in Kisangani and other major towns. The rebels SPLA came and told the population that the government of Congo under Laurent Desire Kabila was collaborating with the Sudanese government to transport Sudanese soldiers direct from Khartoum all the way to Dungu and Ndoromo in order to retake the towns that they had lost. While still in the towns, the SPLA robbed and looted the Catholic Diocese of Dungu-Ndoromo. They looted the diocese vehicles, motorcycles, bikes and any thing they found valuable. They also forcefully took all the refugees back with them to Sudan. Those refugees who didn't want to return to a war zone Sudan had to seek refuge again, this time in the Central African Republic. These refugees were not only under pressure from the SPLA, but they also faced harm from the Congolese population, who blamed them for being the reason why the SPLA rebels came to Ndoromo and Dungu.

== The LRA ==
The people of Dungu and Ndoromo in recent times have fallen victims to Joseph Kony's Lord's Resistance Army (LRA) killing of civilians, house burning, and rape.

For many years, in the Haut Uélé District of DR Congo, the LRA rebel group has plundered villages. Since December 2008, the Ugandan Army has supported the Congolese Army in eradicating such rebel groups. Following a strong military action from the army, rebels dispersed in the region yet continued to plunder villages in smaller numbers. This, in turn, has caused panic and sparked residents to seek refuge in the bush, a phenomenon exemplified in towns like Dungu and Ndoromo, or even farther south.

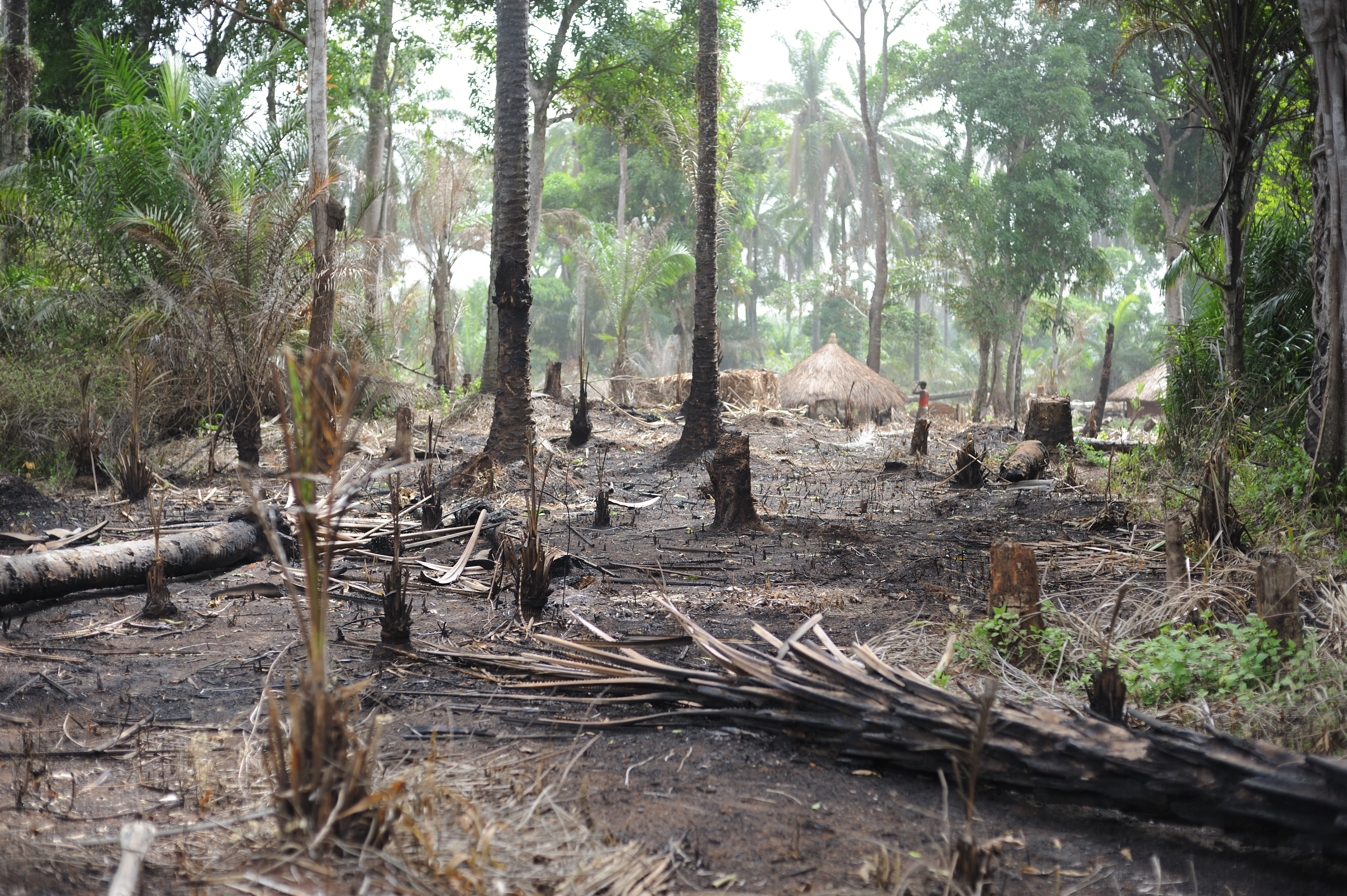
Zande tribe refugee camp under construction outside Doruma, 2009.

Since the end of December 2008, the LRA has come closer to Ndoromo, and its strategy shifted from the plunder of villages to kidnapping 11- to 17-year-old children to enlist as child-soldiers, to the mere massacre of local populations. 189 dead and 111 missing people have been reported before 24 December 2008, along with reports of tortured children and fires in the bush and fields, preventing the population from running away.

In such a context, the town of Ndoromo, protected by the Congolese and Ugandan armies, and normally hosting around 6,000 inhabitants, came to host in one month more than 17,000 Internally Displaced Persons (IDPs) from neighbouring locations, arriving deprived from any personal belonging.

== Transportation ==
The town is served by Doruma Airport.

== Healthcare ==
As of March 2012, there was a hospital located in Doruma.
