= Zande literature =

Zande literature consists of the (mostly oral) literature of the Zande people of North Central Africa.

A collection of Zande stories, Pa Rika Anya na Asanza, was published by the missionary Mrs. Edward Clive Gore in 1931, and republished in 1954; she and her husband, the Canon Edward Clive Gore, also published a number of volumes on Zande language. Many of the Zande stories were translated into English and published by E. E. Evans-Pritchard.

== Proverbs ==
E. E. Evans-Pritchard argued that sanza, sometimes translated as "double-speak", is the dominant mode in Zande proverbs, and indeed it is used as a general term to describe proverbial sayings. The term also means "spite, hate, envy, and jealousy". He also maintains that, based on his studies, the Azande have many more proverbs than, for instance, the Nuer and Anuak people.

Evans-Pritchard published many of these proverbs in a number of articles for the Royal Anthropological Institute of Great Britain and Ireland. He comments that these proverbs do not feature rhyme or alliteration, but they have a notable rhythm or balance, "sometimes a balanced opposition, between the two halves of the sentence. Thus: sambiasambia i a so ko perapera / tiriki i a so ko pu, 'cautious one was grazed by the spear / it went right through the careless one'; i ni rigi nduka / nduka ki rigi ira ha, 'they feed the ridge / and the ridge feeds its owner'; i ni ngere ti boro / wa i ni ngere ti baga?, 'can one look into a person / as one looks into an open-wove basket?'; mvuru a ru ti mukumtuku / ki ya u kii ti ni, 'the little gazelle stood by the fallen (uprooted) tree / and said he was bigger than it...'; i na dia nga bambu ku ari yo / ka wada a ku sende no te, 'they do not begin a hut at the top / to thatch it downwards'." The proverbs often require an intimate understanding of the natural environment of the Zande people, as well as a knowledge of the sanza and the Zande folk tales, which the proverbs often lean on. Evans-Pritchard speculates that the relative preponderance of hunting references (as opposed to agricultural references) signals a past shift toward agriculture, and that the lack of reference to three Zande institutions ("rule of the Vongara aristocracy, witchcraft beliefs, and consultation of oracles") might mean the proverbs are older than these.

== Folk tales ==
Many of the folk tales involve animals; "Azande broadly classify animal life into anya, animals (mostly mammals), azile, birds, awo, snakes, atio, fish and agbiro, insects. Reptiles, except the snakes, tend to be described as anya, animals, if they are large and as agbiro, insects, if they are small." Game animals are divided into bi and zamba, which Evans-Pritchard translates as "light" and "dark"; the first category is sometimes not allowed to eat, for instance for boys who have recently been circumcised. Animals that are "ill-omened (ahu kpere)" include a wild cat (dandara), the jackal, the slough of the iguana (presaging death), the chameleon (presaging the death of a relative), a chimpanzee when on the ground.

A frequent figure of speech in Zande stories, as with proverbs, is sanza, or "double-speak".

== Trickster tales ==
The main trickster figure in Zande tales is Ture. In "Ture and Bigtooth", Ture steals a man's breadfruit from a tree and then tricks the man's children into killing their father. In "Ture and Yangaima", Yangaima acquires wealth by way of his father's plumes, which Ture steals from him. Both ascend in the sky to fight over them, and Yangaima now tricks Ture and gets his plumes back--in one version, Ture falls to the ground and begins to die.
