= Simon Kero =

South Sudanese traditional musician (born 1968)

Simon Kero (born 1968) is a South Sudanese traditional musician from Yambio, celebrated for his hit song "Bambe Ma Kaimo."

In October 2024, after performing at a concert in Juba, he found himself stranded without funds or food due to a payment dispute.
