= The Secret Life of Bill Clinton =

The Secret Life of Bill Clinton: The Unreported Stories
- First edition book cover from 1997
- Author: Ambrose Evans-Pritchard
- Language: English
- Genre: Politics, Biography
- Publisher: Regnery Publishing
- Publication date: 25 November 1997
- Publication place: United States
- Media type: Print (Hardback)
- Pages: 460
- ISBN: 9780895264084

The Secret Life of Bill Clinton: The Unreported Stories is a critical biography about certain episodes during the administration of former United States president Bill Clinton by English author and investigative journalist Ambrose Evans-Pritchard.

== Content ==
The book, published in 1997 by Regnery Publishing, Washington, D.C, an imprint of Eagle Publishing caused controversy in the USA. Evans-Pritchard, the author, at the time was chief editor in Washington DC for the Sunday Telegraph. In particular, the book investigates the death of former deputy White House counsel Vincent Foster.

Evans-Pritchard had initially intended the book to be titled The Secret History of the Clinton Presidency, in reference to Secret History, a sixth-century book by Procopius of Caesarea "about Justinian and Theodora and the wicked things that went on in the Byzantine court - the salacious gossip and terrible goings-on and murders and so forth".

The Secret Life makes various allegations about Clinton, including drug use, visits to prostitutes and dishonesty. In the book he also repeats the Oklahoma City bombing conspiracy theory that the Oklahoma City bombing was an FBI sting operation that went horribly wrong, that warnings by an ATF undercover agent were ignored, and that the Justice Department subsequently engaged in a cover-up.

In Clinton's America, Evans-Pritchard alleged: "The way American reporters cover Arkansas is exactly the way they covered Nicaragua, which is they didn't go out into the hills and talk to ordinary people."

== Reaction ==
Evans-Pritchard's work has been criticized as: "little more than wild flights of conspiratorial fancy coupled with outrageous and wholly uncorroborated allegations", although Robert Novak defends Evans-Pritchard as: "...being no conspiracy-theory lunatic.... [H]e was known in Washington for accuracy, industry and courage."

However, long-time Clinton defender Gene Lyons, columnist for the Arkansas Democrat-Gazette and author of Fools for Scandal: How the Media Invented Whitewater (Franklin Square Press, 1996), says in an article: 'When necessary, Evans-Pritchard resorts to even more questionable methods. The temptation, in addressing so manifestly absurd and error-filled a piece of work, is to raillery. In form, Evans-Pritchard's book is a feverish concatenation of what his countryman, Guardian Washington correspondent Martin Walker, calls "the Clinton legends" into one vast, delusional epic.'
