= Bitima =

- Location in Democratic Republic of the Congo
- Coordinates: 4°21′11″N 28°37′33″E
- Country: Democratic Republic of the Congo
- Province: Haut-Uele
- Territory: Dungu
- Chiefdom: Wando
- Climate: Aw

Bitima is a village situated in Haut-Uele Province, Democratic Republic of the Congo.

== History ==
LRA attacked Bitima in September 2008. Due to the presence of LRA, the locals fled Nabiapai, Gangura, Yambio, and Makpandu in South Sudan in September and October 2008. LRA stormed Bitima on 25 December 2008 as part of 2008 Christmas massacres, killing 13 people. The locals who sought refuge in South Sudan returned to the village in April and May 2009 due to the presence of FARDC.

== Economy ==
The villagers heavily rely on the agricultural sector by harvesting rice, peanuts, corn, cassava, vegetables, and sweet potatoes.

== Education ==
There is a primary school in Bitima. LRA burned the school on an unknown date.

== Healthcare ==
Bitima has a health center. In August 2010, the health center was closed.

== Infrastructure ==
There is a border post in Bitima manned by FARDC soldiers.

== Bibliography ==
- Solidarités International; UNICEF (2010). RD Congo: RRMP HUBU - DIAGNOSTIC MULTISECTORIEL « MSA LIGHT », BITIMA, 26-28 AOÛT 2010 (PDF) (Report).
