= Azande Kingdom =

East African kingdom formed about 300 years ago

The Zande, also known as the Azande Kingdom, is a kingdom predominantly dominated by the Zande people or tribe. It is located in the area of Western Equatoria State of South Sudan. Its royal seat or capital is based in Yambio which is also the state capital of Western Equatoria State.

== History ==
Reliable sources cite that the Azande Kingdom was founded approximately 300 years ago.

It's not clear who the first king of the Azande Kingdom was, but one of the prominent rulers of the kingdom was King Gbudwe who ruled the kingdom from 1870 to 1905. King Gbudwe was killed during the British patrol led by Major Boulnois in February 1905 after resisting the British administration at the time.

The current king of the Azande Kingdom is Atoroba Peni Rikito who was crowned on 9 February 2022 and is the great-grandson of Gbudwe.

== Administration ==
As with many African kingdoms, the Azande Kingdom is political and religious in nature. The ruler of the kingdom is responsible for social command and security of the kingdom. The kingdom is divided into provincial states and the king rules over the central province and appoints governors, with one of his eldest sons being the most important of them, to rule over the surrounding provinces of his kingdom.

== Geography ==
The Azande who are also part of Bantu group of people can be found in the southeastern Central African Republic, northeastern part of the Democratic Republic of the Congo and in the south-central and southwestern part of South Sudan.

The Azande language is similar to the other Bantu languages. Approximately five dialects are said to be spoken throughout the area they occupy. The Azande people of South Sudan mainly live in places such as Central Equatoria, Western Equatoria and Western Bahr el Ghazal States in areas like Yei, Maridi, Yambio, Tambura, Deim Zubeir, Wau Town and Momoi. The Azande are predominantly agriculturalists who plant crops like maize, beans and sorghum and fruits too. The favorite Azande meal is cassava leaves prepared with palm oil commonly known as Nzeme Mbiro and eaten with boiled cassava or posho.

== Historiography ==
The foremost scholarly work on Azande history is The Azande: History and Political Institutions (1971) by E. E. Evans-Pritchard (an early- to mid-20th-century British anthropologist), with little work done on the topic since. Evans-Pritchard conducted his fieldwork between 1926 and 1930; Clifford Geertz characterised his work as aiming to bring Africans into the sphere of English understanding and "into a world conceived in deeply English terms, and confirming thereby the dominion of those terms", with which Paola Ivanov concurred, and he also advocated for indirect rule. According to Ivanov, Evans-Pritchard's work offered many valuable insights that were presented intuitively and simply, but at times it suffered from carelessness and shallow analyses. She wrote that he built on the colonial historiography that preceded him, becoming influenced by derogatory clichés therein, such as seeking to research Azande traditional society and culture as a single uniform unit that was historically static, portraying the Azande and their expansion as inherently imperialistic and militaristic, and uncritically using hearsay about the Avongara clan being cannibals (fanned by a 19th-century stereotype of the Central African interior that portrayed the Azande as 'savage cannibals' with tails or dogs' heads, known as "Nyam Nyam"). His work also greatly underestimated how much Azande political institutions were transformed during the early period of colonial rule.
