= Aba, Democratic Republic of the Congo =

Aba
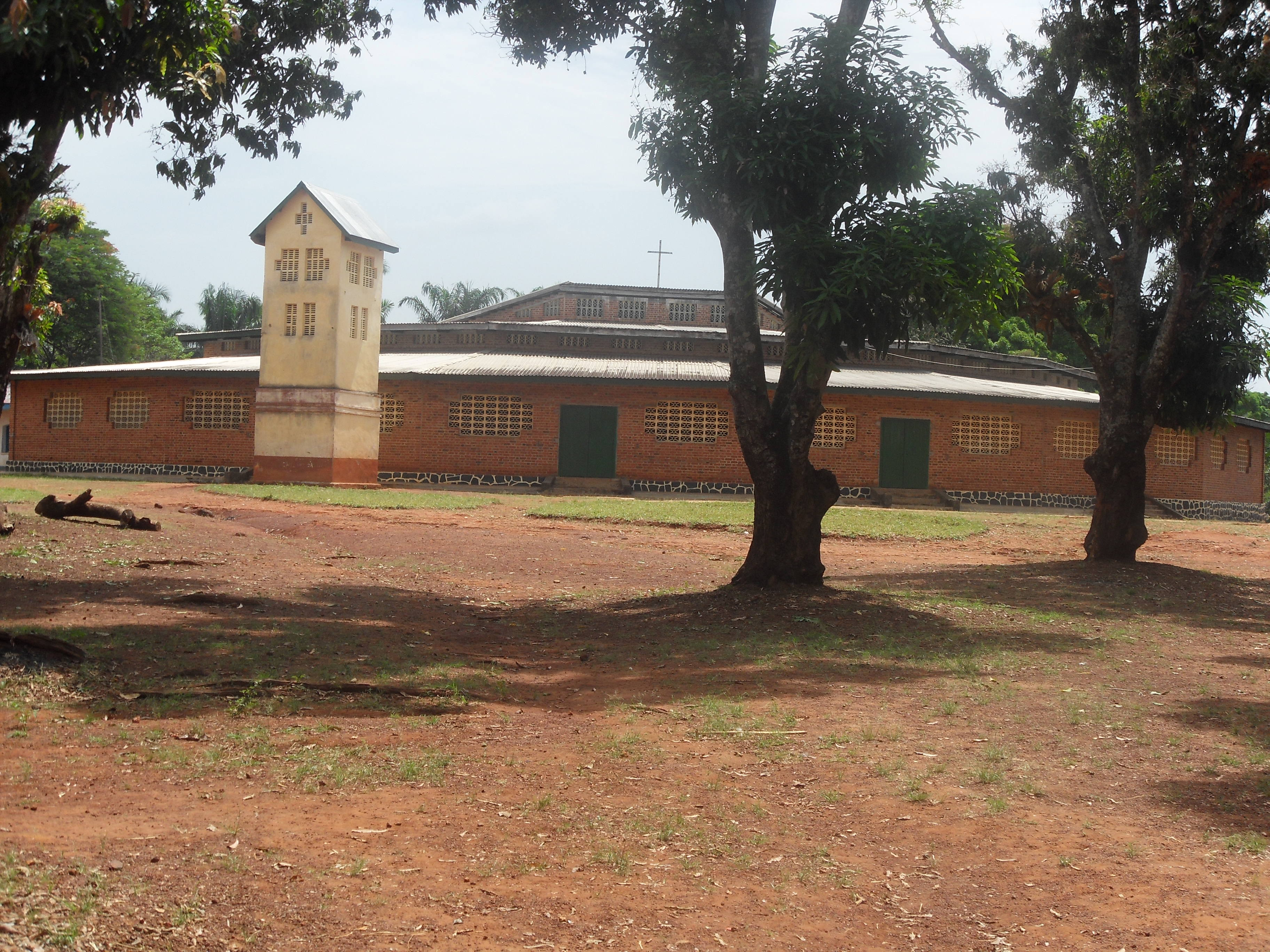

- Location in Democratic Republic of the Congo
- Coordinates: 3°52′N 30°14′E
- Country: Democratic Republic of the Congo
- Province: Haut-Uele
- Climate: Aw
- National language: Lingala

Aba is a city in the northeast of the Haut-Uélé province in the Democratic Republic of the Congo; it is near the border with South Sudan.

In 2005 the Lord's Resistance Army was reported to be in Aba. MONUC, a United Nations peacekeeping operation, deployed troops to assist.

Aba is the location of the Meri site, a refugee location for South Sudanese fleeing the fighting in Lasu. More than 30,000 people sought refuge there between 2013 and 2017.

== Transport ==
It is served by Aba Airport.
