= Aba Airport =

- IATA: none; ICAO: FZJF

Summary
- Serves: Aba, Democratic Republic of the Congo
- Elevation AMSL: 3,051 ft / 930 m
- Coordinates: 03°51′35″N 30°15′15″E

Map
- Location of airport in the DRC

Runways
Direction	Length		Surface
Direction	m	ft	Surface
07/25	985	3,232	Grass
- GCM Google Maps

Aba Airport (ICAO: FZJF) is an airport serving Aba, a city in the Haut-Uélé province of the Democratic Republic of the Congo. The runway is 2 kilometres (1.2 mi) east of the city.
