= Gbudwe =

Azande ruler

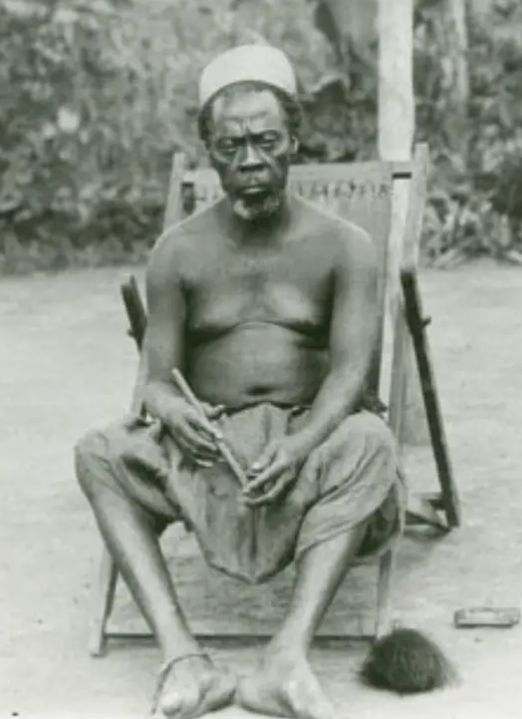
- King Gbudwe in the early 1900s
- Born: c. 1835; Azande Kingdom
- Died: February 10, 1905 (aged c. 70); Azande Kingdom
- Military career
- Service years: 1870-1905
- Rank: King Of Azande
- Conflicts: Battle Of Burekiwe

Gbudwe Bazingbi (c. 1835), also known as Yambio, was the Azande King in South Sudan from 1870–1905.

His real name was Mbio, which means 'a kind of small antelope'. He had renamed himself "Gbudwe" (also "Gbudue"), meaning 'to tear out a man's intestines'.

== Description ==
Edward Evan Evans-Pritchard quotes a description of King Gbudwe of the Azande:

"King Gbudwe was a short man, though not excessively short... he was stout also... His breasts protruded like those of a woman... His eyes were little protruding eyes, and they sparkled like stars. When he looked at a man in anger they were terrible; then they went grey like ashes... When he approached people from afar you could not mistake King Gbudwe. He was a marvelous prince."

He was unusual among Azande kings in preferring to lead from the front, and as a young man, he often took part in the fighting in person. He possessed a magic whistle, which was said to guarantee victory if blown before a battle. He encouraged his men to eat the Arabs they killed, although cannibalism was probably not normal Azande practice.

== Relationship with other societies ==
King Gbudwe hated and despised both Egyptian Arabs and whites, dismissing them all in a memorable phrase as "dirty little crop-headed barbarians". In the early 1870s, he fought a vicious civil war with his brothers after the death of their father, and after consolidating his power he went on to win several battles against the Arabs, French, and the British.

In 1882, after one disastrously unsuccessful attempt, an official expedition was sent against him by the Egyptian authorities in Bahr el Ghazal Province, whose governor at the time was the Englishman Lupton Bey. The Egyptians with the help of rival Azande captured King Gbudwe and imprisoned him.

In the following year, the Mahdists overran Sudan, and they decided to release him. King Gbudwe then went home and supervised the extermination of all the Arabs who were left in his country (Zandeland). One of Evans-Pritchard's informants summarizes his subsequent relations with his fellow Azande:

"When he heard it said of a prince that he had many followers he made war against him, and he sent one of his sons in The Modern Mid Western Equatoria to reside there and to rule over the non Zande referred to as Awuro to be his subjects. He met resistance from many other tribes, the during the resistance with the Azande king, many people were displaced, to the mountainous Area of Western Equatoria. The King had the objective of ruling the whole Western Equatoria. Thus Gbudwe prospered and became a great king, for he made war against any prince who opposed him. He only was a great king and continued as such. Gbudwe was a powerful and a daring man, for he overcame all princes, and for him alone they became meek. After he had overcome them all he rested in peace, and he distributed provinces to all his sons, and he left it to them to make war against many peoples."

The Mahdists left him alone until 1898, when, just months before their own regime was destroyed at the Battle of Omdurman, they sent an army under Arabi Dafalla to deal with him. King Gbudwe soundly defeated these forces at the Battle of Burekiwe (Yambio). By this time, however, the main threat was not from the Arabs, but from the three European powers whose spheres of interest met in Azandeland - the British, the French, and the Belgian King Leopold's Congo Free State.

Other Azande princes had already been fighting the whites, with varying success, since the beginning of the 1890s. In 1904 Gbudwe was persuaded to lead an attack on some forts which the Belgians had built in his territory, even though - because of his policy of hostility towards all foreigners - he had still not managed to acquire significant numbers of firearms. The Azande assault was beaten off with heavy losses.

In the aftermath, many of his vassals defected to the Belgians and British, and the combination of heavy casualties and demoralization fatally weakened the once-mighty conqueror. King Gbudwe's capital, Yambio was in an area that was allocated to the Anglo-Egyptian Sudan when the border with the Congo Free State was eventually settled, and in 1905 a British column arrived there. Its intentions were unclear to the Azande, but as it approached the people fled, and King Gbudwe was discovered sitting at the door of his hut, entirely alone.

== Death ==
Isolated, deserted by his warriors, and staring into the rifle barrels of a company of tough Sudanese soldiers, the old chief picked up a rifle and started shooting. At least one askari fell wounded; then return fire hit Gbudwe in the arm and thigh. He dropped his rifle, and some soldiers ran up to take him, prisoner, so he drew a pistol which he had been hiding behind his back and dropped three more of them. Showing remarkable restraint, the soldiers grabbed him and took him alive, but soon Gbudwe was dead - he either starved himself to death or was murdered while in custody by his own grandson. Either way, with his demise the era of Azande independence was finally over; their country was partitioned among the colonial powers, and their traditional warlike activities were forbidden. And to summarize the above statement King Gbudwe died on February 10, 1905.
