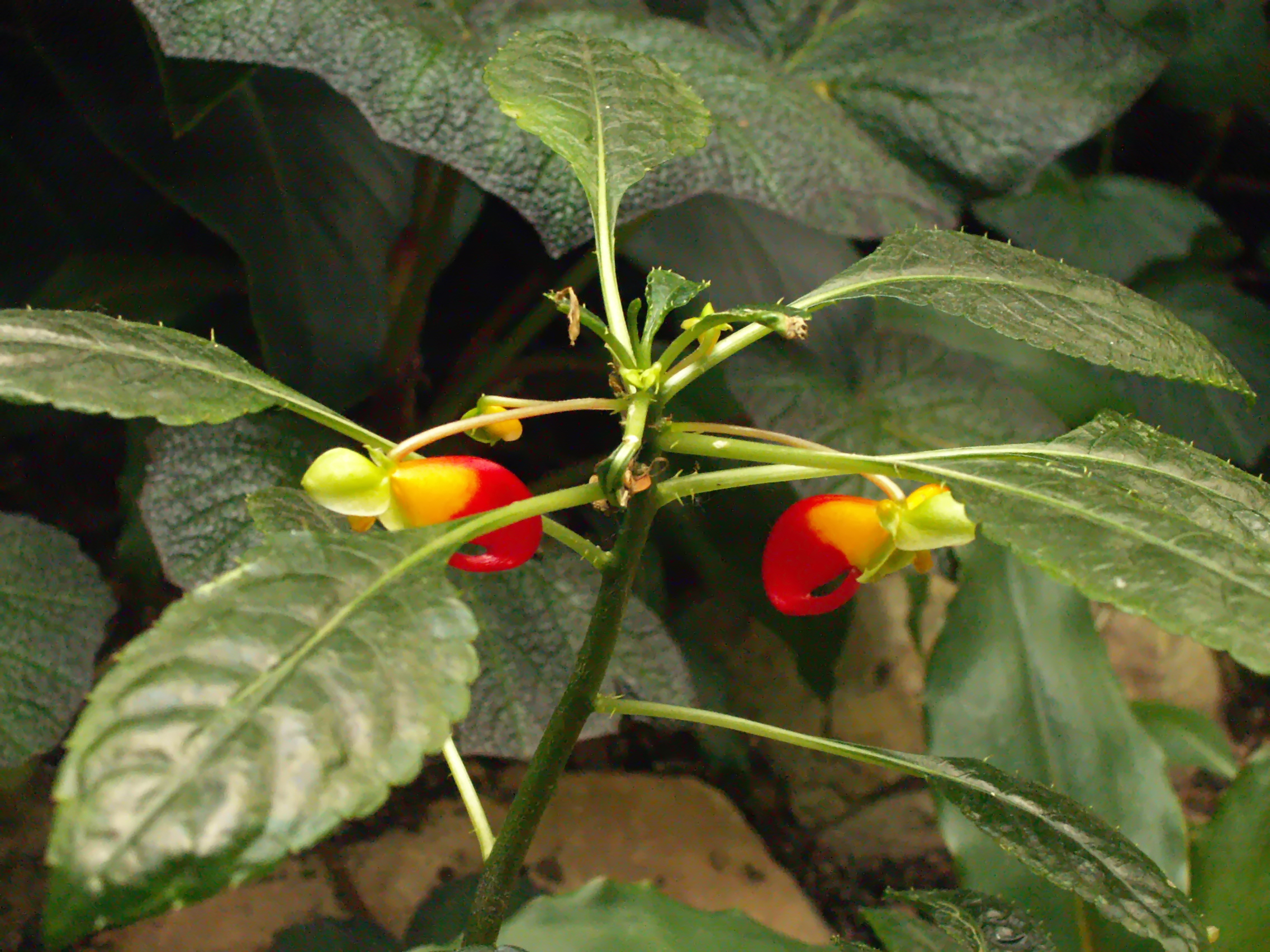
- Cultivar 'African King' in Phipps Conservatory and Botanical Gardens

Scientific classification
- Kingdom: Plantae
- Clade: Embryophytes
- Clade: Tracheophytes
- Clade: Angiosperms
- Clade: Eudicots
- Clade: Asterids
- Order: Ericales
- Family: Balsaminaceae
- Genus: Impatiens
- Species: I. niamniamensis

Binomial name
- Impatiens niamniamensis Gilg

Synonyms
- Impatiens bicolor Hook.f.; Impatiens bicolor var. brevifolia Warb.; Impatiens dichroa Hook.f. ex Gilg; Impatiens myriantha Gilg; Impatiens violaceopilosula De Wild.

= Impatiens niamniamensis =

Species of flowering plant

Impatiens niamniamensis, common name Congo cockatoo, parrot impatiens or simply parrot plant, is a species of flowering plant in the family Balsaminaceae.

== Description ==
Impatiens niamniamensis grows about 60–90 centimetres (24–35 in) long. This evergreen, perennial species has an erect, succulent, brown stem resembling wood. Leaves are simple, ovate-oblong or elliptical, spirally arranged, about 10 cm long.

This plant produces bright and colourful bird-shaped flowers (hence the common names Congo cockatoo and parrot plant) with a long, curled nectar spur. These unusual flowers vary in colour and size, but those of the clone most common in cultivation in Europe and America ('African Princess') are usually scarlet red and yellow and can reach a length of about 3.5 centimetres (1.4 in). Fruits are explosive capsules of about 14–16 mm.

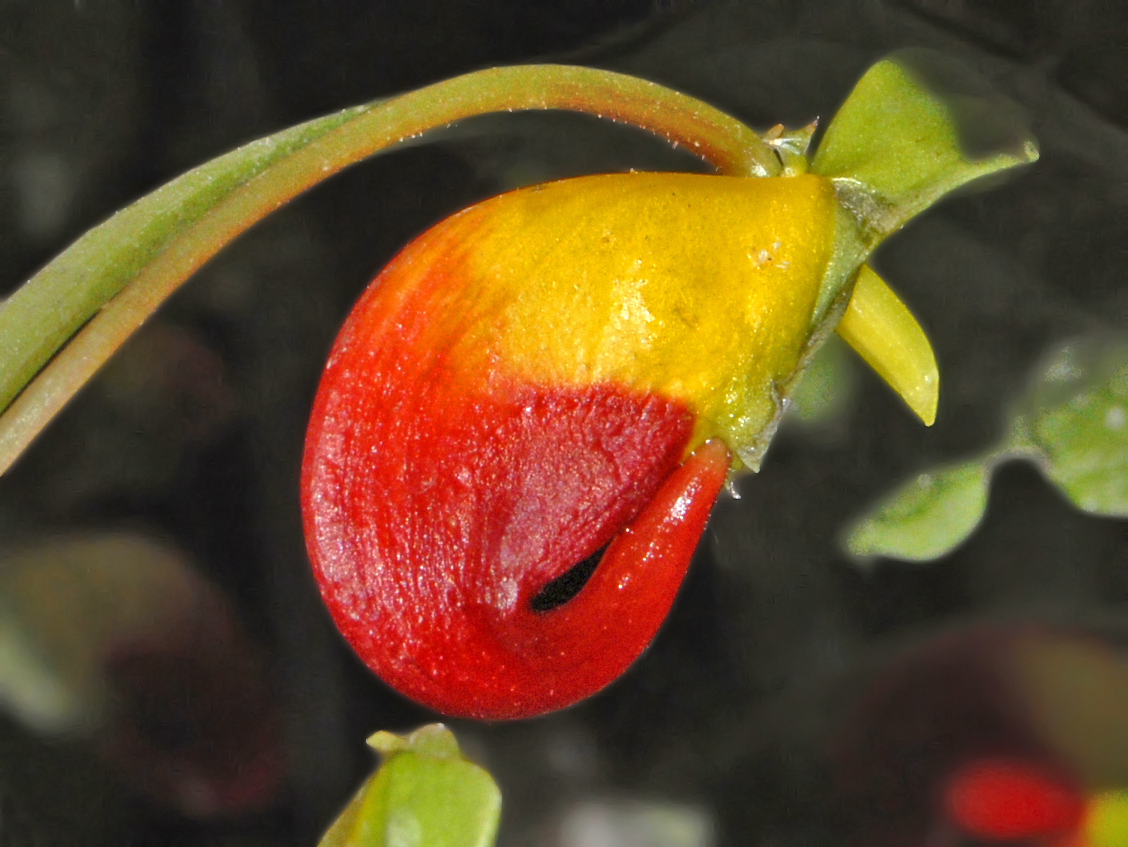
Close-up on a flower of Impatiens niamniamensis

== Etymology ==
The epithet niamniamensis comes from the onomatopoeic name Niam-Niam which is sometimes used for the Azande people who live in the south-eastern part of the Central African Republic.

== Distribution and habitat ==
Impatiens niamniamensis comes from tropical Africa. It can be found from Cameroon throughout tropical Africa, up to Sudan and down to the Democratic Republic of the Congo. It grows in moist and shaded bushlands, at an elevation of 350–2,400 metres (1,150–7,870 ft) above sea level.

== Cultivation ==
This plant is widely cultivated. In temperate zones it requires protection from temperatures below 10 °C (50 °F). It needs a sheltered position in a partially shaded spot. Impatiens niamniamensis has gained the Royal Horticultural Society's Award of Garden Merit.
