= Jean-Pierre Déricoyard =

Jean-Pierre Tita Déricoyard (21 July 1907–11 October 1996) was a Congolese politician and businessman.

== Early life ==
Jean-Pierre Tita Déricoyard was born on 21 July 1907 to an Azande family in Bambili, Orientale Province, Belgian Congo. He attended the Ecole Officielle des candidats-commis in Stanleyville before studying at the Frères Maristes in 1915. He earned his diploma in 1924 with distinction. After six years of work in the colonial administration he served as a clerk for various companies. He later moved to Léopoldville where in 1949 he established Déricoyard Fréres, a furniture and trade business. Déricoyard rose to prominence in the private sector and his venture became one of the most successful Congolese-owned firms in the capital. At the time he was the only Zande to achieve such status in the region. He eventually became an administrator of a Congolese businessmen cooperative and the leader of an ethnic association for people from Ituri and the Uélés. Déricoyard also became the president of the Frères Maristes alumni association and served on the advisory board for the monthly La Voix du Congolaise.

== Political career ==
In 1956 Déricoyard participated in a conference organised by the Solvay Institute of Sociology to discuss the Congolese economy. Two years later he attended the All-African Peoples' Conference in Accra, Ghana as an observer. (Note: Thomas Kanza speculated that he likely went to spy on the Mouvement National Congolais delegation for the Belgian government.) In April 1959 he founded the Parti Travailliste Congolais, a political party. At his initiative, the organisation urged the colonial administration to hold a round table conference to discuss the political future of the Congo.

In the general elections of May 1960 Déricoyard won a seat in the Chamber of Deputies with 5,509 preferential votes. On 18 December 1962 a motion of censure was tabled against Déricoyard in the Chamber of Deputies, who was serving as Minister of Economic Affairs. Three days later the motion was debated by the Chamber. Déricoyard's critics accused him of engaging in corrupt activities in the northeast and failing to do enough to control commodity prices and curtail black market activities. The motion ultimately failed, 30 votes to 57 with 7 abstentions.

Following the 1965 general elections, Déricoyard was made provisional President of the Chamber of Deputies while the elected candidates' credentials were confirmed.
