= Richard Buchta =

Austrian photographer, writer and explorer (1845–1894

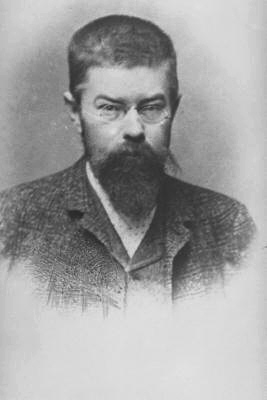
- Richard Buchta, 1880
- Born: 19 January 1845; Radlow, Austrian Empire
- Died: 29 July 1894 (aged 49); Vienna, Austrian Empire
- Occupation: Photographer, writer, traveler, painter, drawer, ethnologist
- Years active: 1870s–1890s
- Known for: Travelogues and photographs of 19th-century Sudan

Richard Buchta (Austrian German: [ˈrɪçard ˈbʊxta]; 19 January 1845 – 29 July 1894) was an Austrian explorer in East Africa, travel writer, painter and photographer. Born in Radlow, Galicia, in the Austrian Empire, he traveled widely, first to Germany, France as well as the Balkans, and later also to Turkey, Egypt and the Sudan. Upon his return to Germany and later to Austria, he published several books on the geography, ethnic groups and political conditions of Sudan in the 1870s and 1880s. His historical photographs, taken mainly in southern Sudan, have been regarded as the earliest photographs of ethnic people living along the White Nile and beyond.

== Life and travels ==
In 1877, Buchta arrived at Khartoum, where Charles George Gordon, then Governor-General of the Turkish-Egyptian Sudan, facilitated his onward journey to Emin Pasha at Ladó, on the Upper Nile. There, he traveled with Italian explorer Romolo Gessi further along the towards the sources of the White Nile as far as to today's northern Uganda. He took some of the earliest existing photographs of ethnic people in these regions, such as the Acholi, Bari, Baka, Zande, Shilluk or Dinka. Upon his return to Germany in 1881, he published his impressions along with 160 mounted albumen prints in the book Die oberen Nilländer: Volkstypen und Landschaften. (The Lands of the Upper Nile: Ethnic people and Landscapes).

In 1885, Buchta undertook another voyage through Egypt and the desert to Fayum. During his later years, he was collaborated on the first volume of Wilhelm Junker's work Travels in Africa: During the years 1875-1878. Buchta died in Vienna on 29 July 1894, at age 49.

== Reception ==
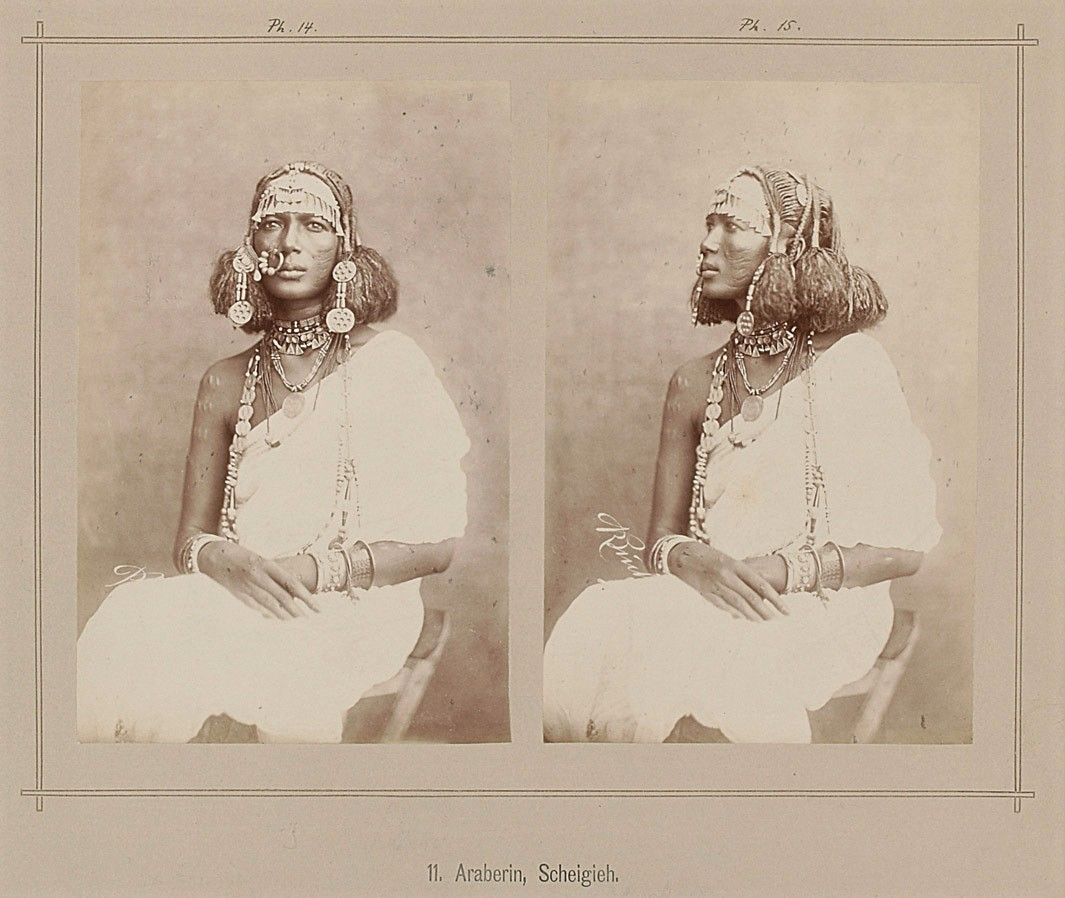
Historical photograph of a Shaigiya woman in Sudan, by Richard Buchta, around 1878

Even though his photographs were frequently reproduced by travel writers of the time, his work was largely forgotten in the 20th century. In the context of studies on the history of photography in Africa, however, the importance of Buchta's visual records and their influence on late 19th-century visual history of Africa have gained new attention.

His photographs have been used for anthropological and historical studies and are kept in different collections such as in the Pitt Rivers Museum, Oxford, UK, as well as in the collections of the Museum of Ethnology, in Vienna.

On the occasion of an exhibition of his photographs in 2015, the Pitt Rivers Museum wrote: "His journey into Equatoria Province (now part of South Sudan and northern Uganda) shaped the visual representation of its peoples in European literature for a generation, being celebrated and reproduced, mostly in engraved form, by all the major explorer-writers of central Africa in the period."

In 2001, Christie's auctioned 49 albumen prints by Buchta from the 1880s titled Album d'Afrique centrale.

== Selected works (in German) ==
- Die oberen Nilländer, Volkstypen und Landschaften, with 160 photographic views (1881)
- Der Sudan und der Mahdi. Das Land, die Bewohner und der Aufstand (1884)
- Der Sudan unter ägyptischer Herrschaft (1888)

== See also ==
- Photography in Sudan
