= Doruma Airport =

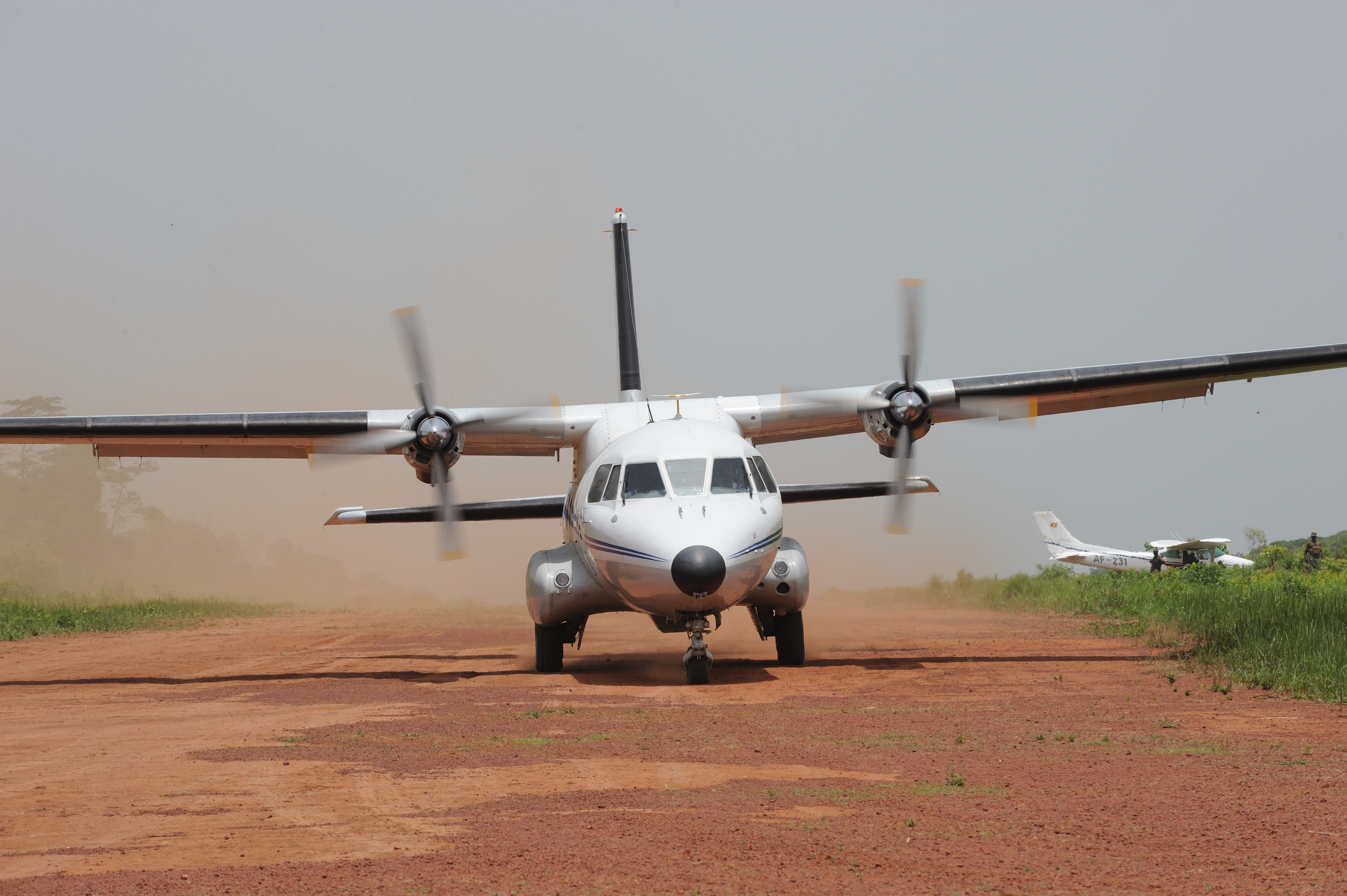
- Aid being flown into Doruma in 2009
- IATA: none; ICAO: FZJD

Summary
- Serves: Doruma, Democratic Republic of the Congo
- Elevation AMSL: 2,379 ft / 725 m
- Coordinates: 4°43′05″N 27°41′30″E

Map
- Location of airport in the Democratic Republic of the Congo

Runways
Direction	Length		Surface
Direction	m	ft	Surface
05/23	900	2,953	Gravel
- Source: Google Maps GCM

Doruma Airport (ICAO: FZJD) is an airstrip serving the town of Doruma, Haut-Uélé Province, Democratic Republic of the Congo. The runway is on the east side of Doruma, and 9 kilometres (5.6 mi) from the border with South Sudan.

== See also ==
- Transport in the Democratic Republic of the Congo
- List of airports in the Democratic Republic of the Congo
