= The Nuer =

Ethnographical study by the British anthropologist E. E. Evans-Pritchard

- Author: E. E. Evans-Pritchard
- Original title: The Nuer: A Description of the Modes of Livelihood and Political Institutions of a Nilotic People
- Subject: Social anthropology
- Publisher: Clarendon Press
- Publication date: 1940
- Preceded by: Witchcraft, Oracles and Magic Among the Azande (1937)
- Followed by: The Sanusi of Cyrenaica (1949)

The Nuer: A Description of the Modes of Livelihood and Political Institutions of a Nilotic People is an ethnographical study by the British anthropologist E. E. Evans-Pritchard (1902–73) first published in 1940. The work examined the political and familial systems of the Nuer people in the Anglo-Egyptian Sudan and is considered a landmark work of social anthropology. It was the first of three books authored by Evans-Pritchard on Nuer culture.

== The structure of the book ==
The first two chapters - 'Cattle' and 'Oecology' - provided an environmental setting for the Nuer, cattle pastoralists who carried on limited horticulture. Evans-Pritchard emphasised the extent to which cattle dominated both their economic activity and their social ideals:

They consider that horticulture is an unfortunate necessity involving hard and unpleasant labor and not an ideal occupation, and they tend to act on the conviction that the larger the herd, the smaller need be the garden.

The Nuer was the first of three books which Evans-Pritchard would publish on the Nuer. The others were published as Kinship and Marriage Among the Nuer (1951) and Nuer Religion (1956).

In the book's introduction, Evans-Pritchard warmly thanked the Nuer for the welcome he felt they gave him:

my warmest thanks are further rendered to the many Nuer who made me their guest and befriended me. Rather than speak of individuals, I express my general respect for this brave and gentle people.

== Reception ==
The Nuer is considered a landmark work of social anthropology and has been discussed extensively. Audrey Richards considered that the book, though "unsatisfying in some respects, it is a brilliant tonic, and in the best sense of the word, an irritating book". This judgment has been echoed by modern academics. Renato Rosaldo has criticised Evans-Pritchard for rendering invisible, in the subsequent body of The Nuer, the colonial power dynamics which enabled his ethnographic research. Robert H. Bates described the book as "foundational work" in the study of stateless societies.
