= Yambio Airport =

- IATA: n/a; ICAO: HJYA

Summary
- Airport type: Public, Civilian
- Owner: Civil Aviation Authority of South Sudan
- Serves: Yambio, South Sudan
- Location: Yambio, South Sudan
- Elevation AMSL: 2,375 ft (724 m)
- Coordinates: 04°34′12″N 28°25′32″E

Map
- Location of Yambio Airport in South Sudan

Runways
Direction	Length		Surface
Direction	ft	m	Surface
03/21	3,280	1,000	Unpaved

Yambio Airport is an airport serving Yambio in South Sudan.

== Location ==
Yambio Airport (IATA: n/a, ICAO: HJYA) is located in Yambio County in Western Equatoria, in the town of Yambio, in the southwestern part of South Sudan, near the International borders with the Democratic Republic of the Congo and the Central African Republic. The airport is located just outside town to the northeast of the central business district along the Juba high-way.

This location lies approximately 355 kilometres (221 mi), by air, west of Juba International Airport, the largest airport in South Sudan. The geographic coordinates of this airport are: 4° 34' 12.00"N, 28° 25' 320.02"E (Latitude: 4.57000; Longitude: 28.42556). Yambio Airport sits at an elevation of 724 metres (2,375 ft) above sea level. The airport has a single unpaved runway, measuring approximately 1,000 metres (3,300 ft) in length.

== Overview ==
Yambio Airport is a small civilian Airport that serves the town of Yambio and surrounding communities. The airport does not yet receive regular scheduled airline service, though chartered airlines fly to and from the airport. The airport is being operated by both Civil Aviation Authority of South Sudan and United Nations Mission In South Sudan (UNMISS).

== Flights to Yambio ==
- Eagle air
- Kush air.
- Golden wings.
- South Supreme airlines.
- Mission Aviation Fellowship (MAF).

== See also ==
- Yambio
- Western Equatoria
- Equatoria
- List of airports in South Sudan
