= Nabiapai =

- Location in South Sudan
- Coordinates: 04°22′58″N 28°34′29″E
- Country: South Sudan
- Region: Equatoria
- State: Western Equatoria
- County: Yambio County
- Payam: Gangura
- Time zone: UTC+2 (CAT)

Nabiapai is a border town located near the Democratic Republic of the Congo–South Sudan border.

== History ==
LRA raided and looted Nabiapai on 22 March 2008. LRA invaded the town on 26 December 2008 during the 2008 Christmas massacres, stealing goods and burning the town. Consequently, the residents sought refuge in Gangura.

LRA stormed the town on 3 March 2015 and abducted 13 people. The local self-defense group clashed with LRA and managed to kill one militia member. Later, nine abductees were released.

An unknown armed militia attacked Nabiapai on 26 November 2016 and pillaged the market before withdrawing to Congo. No groups claimed responsibility, but locals blamed the Arrow Boys group led by Alfred Futiyo Karaba for the attack.

SSPDF clashed with FARDC on 2 September 2017 over the misunderstanding. The clash stopped when the commanders from both sides intervened. Due to the clash, some of the residents fled to Yambio.

In November 2021 three people died in Nabiapai, after an off-duty Congolese policeman lost his phone and returned to shoot indiscriminately at a market killing another Congolosese policeman and two South Sudanese nationals including a 11-year-old child.

== Economy ==
The locals depend on cross-border trade, and the town has a market.

== Education ==
There is a primary school in the town.

== Healthcare ==
Nabiapai has one healthcare center.
