= Ambrose Evans-Pritchard =

British business journalist (born 1957)

- Born: 7 December 1957 (age 68); Oxford, United Kingdom
- Education: Trinity College, Cambridge (BA)
- Occupations: Journalist; writer

Ambrose Evans-Pritchard (born 7 December 1957) is an English journalist who is currently the international business editor of the Daily Telegraph.

== Early life ==
Evans-Pritchard was born in Oxford. He was educated at Malvern College and Trinity College, Cambridge, where he read history. His father was E. E. Evans-Pritchard, who was Professor of Social Anthropology at Oxford University from 1946 to 1970.

== Career ==
For thirty years, Evans-Pritchard has "covered world politics and economics" for the Telegraph, "based in Europe, the US, and Latin America". In the mid-1980s, he was Washington correspondent for London's Spectator and was a Central America correspondent for The Economist. In 1991, he began working at the Telegraph, where he was the newspaper's Europe correspondent in Brussels from 1999 to 2004. He also served as Sunday Telegraph's Washington, D.C., bureau chief from the early 1990s until 1997.

== The Secret Life of Bill Clinton ==
Evans-Pritchard is the author of a 1997 biography of Bill Clinton, entitled The Secret Life of Bill Clinton: The Unreported Stories, which was published by conservative publishing firm Regnery Publishing. He originally intended to name the book The Secret History of the Clinton Conspiracy, in homage to the similarly titled exposure of the private lives of the Byzantine Emperor Justinian and his wife Theodora by the sixth-century historian Procopius, but was prevented from doing so by Regnery.

In 1997, Salon called him "The Pied Piper of the Clinton Conspiracists" in a review that said Evans-Pritchard wrote about the Oklahoma City bombing conspiracy theory, as well as other conspiracy theories related to Clinton, including the death of Vince Foster. While working as the Telegraph Washington correspondent, his reports about these issues often attracted the ire of the Clinton administration. When he left Washington, a White House aide was quoted in George saying, "That's another British invasion we're glad is over. The guy was nothing but a pain in the ass." His efforts in ferreting out the witness, Patrick Knowlton, whose last name had been spelled "Nolton" in the Park Police report on Foster's death, resulted eventually in a lawsuit by Knowlton against the FBI and the inclusion of Knowlton's lawyer's letter as an appendix to Kenneth Starr's report on Foster's death.

In his book, Evans-Pritchard responded vigorously to White House charges against him. He also aired his dissatisfaction with press coverage of the issue while discussing the 2022 BBC Radio Four programme The Coming Storm, which analysed the circumstances surrounding the alleged conspiracy at length. In a Telegraph article published shortly after the programme was aired, he jibed at its portrayal of him as a "Sorcerer's Apprentice" who wilfully nourished conspiracy theories, and condemned it for refusing to acknowledge that it was "the failure of the co-opted White House press corps and those on the FBI beat – or, in some cases, their editors – to investigate and report serial misconduct in the early 1990s that fed mistrust of establishment media, leaving the field open for talk radio and the emerging anarchy of the web". He went on to argue that the programme's unbalanced treatment was a revealing insight into "the mental universe of the BBC, a taxpayer-funded institution accused by many of chronic ideological bias in breach of its charter."
