= Democratic Republic of the Congo–South Sudan border =

International border

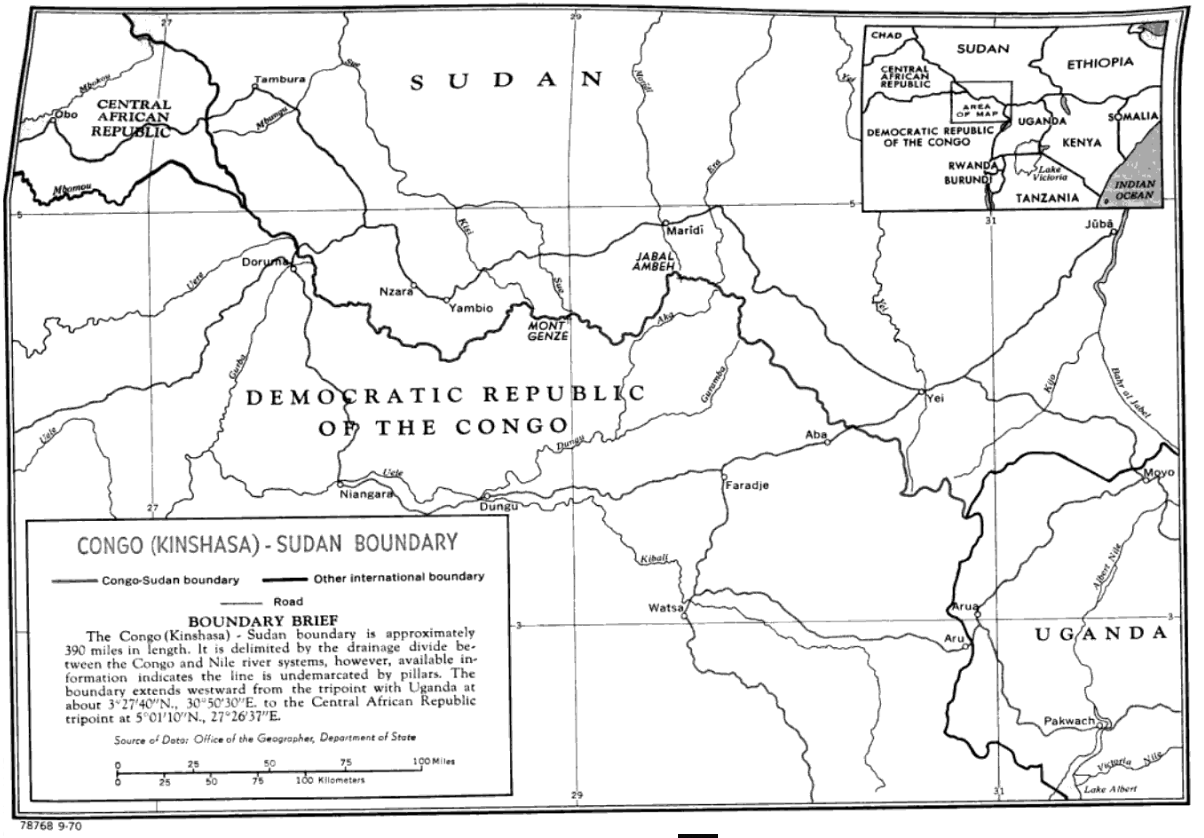
Map of the DRC-South Sudan border

The Democratic Republic of the Congo–South Sudan border is 714 km (444 m) in length and runs from the tripoint with the Central African Republic in the west to the tripoint with the Uganda in the east.

== Description ==
The border starts in the west at the CAR tripoint, proceeding overland in a broadly south-eastwards direction, and then eastwards directions via series of irregular lines, terminating at the tripoint with Uganda. The boundary roughly follows the division between the Nile and Congo drainage divide.

== History ==
The border first emerged during the Scramble for Africa, a period of intense competition between European powers in the later 19th century for territory and influence in Africa. The process culminated in the Berlin Conference of 1884, in which the European nations concerned agreed upon their respective territorial claims and the rules of engagements going forward. At this time the area of the modern DRC was controlled by the Congo Free State, a state held under the personal rule of Belgian King Leopold II, who had sponsored various explorations in the region under the guise of humanitarianism. Sudan (including South Sudan) was conquered by Britain in the 1890s, who then created a condominium with Egypt called Anglo-Egyptian Sudan in January 1899. Britain has already signed a treaty with King Leopold on 12 May 1894 outlining their respective spheres of influence in Central Africa, roughly divided along the Nile-Congo drainage divide. However the treaty also leased large areas of land in Central Africa to the Congo Free State, including the Lado Enclave. The current boundary was confirmed further by a treaty of 9 May 1906.

Administration of the Congo Free State was taken over by the Belgian government in 1908 following controversies engendered by the atrocities committed by Leopold's forces there. The Belgian lease over Lado was terminated by an Anglo-Belgian treaty of 14 May 1910, and the area was thereafter annexed to Sudan.

Sudan gained independence in 1956, followed by the Belgian Congo (as the Republic of the Congo, later renamed Democratic Republic of the Congo) on 30 June 1960. In 2011 South Sudan declared independence from Sudan, and thereby inherited the border with the DRC. The porous boundary today is extremely insecure owing to the after-effects of civil wars in South Sudan, DRC and CAR, as well as the Lord's Resistance Army insurgency which has spilled over from Uganda.

== Settlements near the border ==
=== Democratic Republic of the Congo ===
- Bitima

=== South Sudan ===
- Nabiapai
