= Azande people =

Ethnic group of North Central Africa

Azande
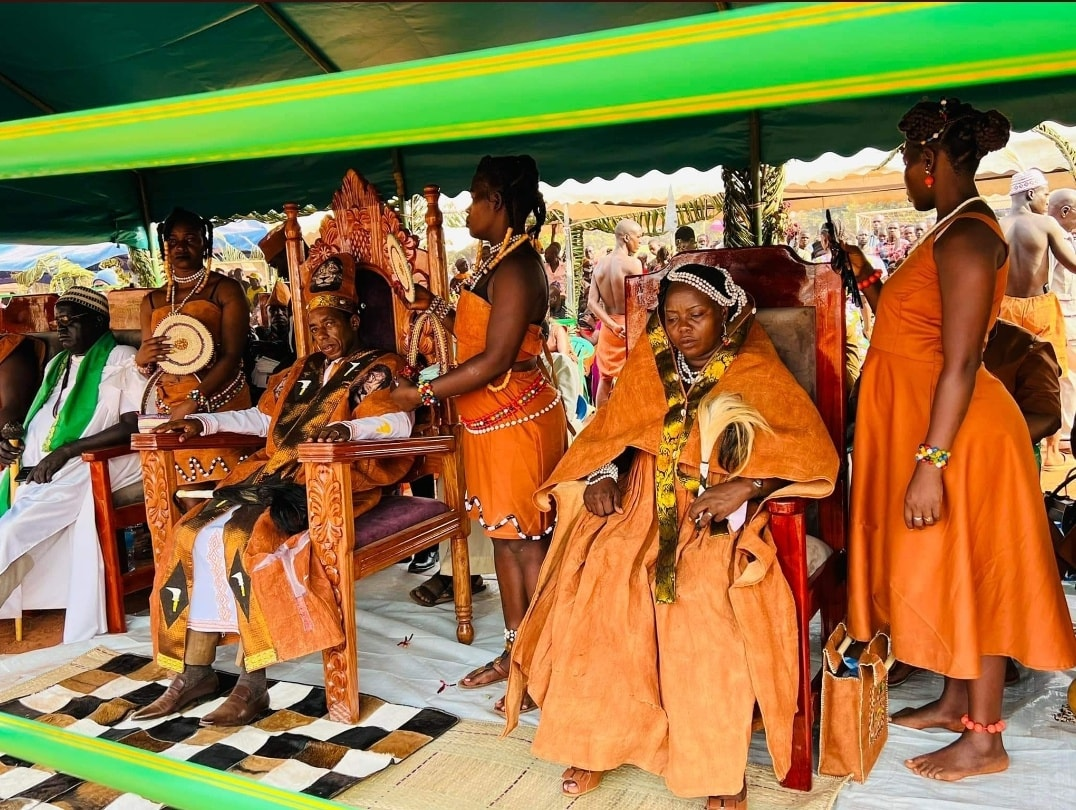
- The Azande royal family

Total population
- 3.8 million at end of 20th century

Regions with significant populations
- Central African Republic: 96,500
- DR Congo: 2,061,000
- South Sudan: 1,040,000

Languages
- Pa-Zande and others

Religion
- Christianity • African Traditional Religion

Related ethnic groups
- Nzakara people • Geme people • Barambu people • Pambia people • Other Ubangian peoples

The Azande (also known as Zande, Azandeh, Azende, Bazende) are an ethnic group in Central Africa speaking the Zande languages (whose classification is uncertain). They live in south-eastern Central African Republic, north-eastern Democratic Republic of the Congo, as well as south-central and south-western South Sudan. The Congolese Azande live in Bas-Uélé, Haut-Uélé and Tshopo provinces along the Uele River; Isiro, Dungu, Kisangani and Duruma. The Central African Azande live in the districts of Rafaï, Bangasu and Obo. The Azande of South Sudan live in Central, Western Equatoria and Western Bahr al-Ghazal States, Yei, Maridi, Yambio, Tombura, Deim Zubeir, Wau Town and Momoi.

== Etymology ==
The word Azande means "the people who possess much land", and refers to their history as conquering warriors.

The onomatopoeic name Niam-Niam (Note: Other spelling variants listed by the British Museum include Nyam nyam, Neam Nam, and Neam Neam.) suggests cannibalism and was sometimes used for the Azande people. It was possibly circulated intentionally to create fear among ethnic groups in the Azande's period of regional conquest. The name shows up on 19th-century maps of Southern Sudan and is now considered pejorative.

The plant species Impatiens niamniamensis is named after the Azande people.

== History ==
The Azande were formed by a military conquest during the first half of the 18th century. They were led by two dynasties that differed in origin and political strategy. The Vungara clan created most of the political, linguistic, and cultural parts. A non-Zande dynasty, the Bandia, expanded into northern Zaire and adopted some of the Zande customs. In the early 19th century, the Bandia people ruled over the Vungara and the two groups became the Azande people. They lived in the savannas of what is now the southeastern part of Central African Republic. After the death of a king, the king's sons would fight for succession. The losing son would often establish kingdoms in neighboring regions, making the Azande Kingdom spread eastward and northward. Sudanese raids halted some of northward expansion later in the 19th century. As a consequence of European colonialism in the 19th century, the territory inhabited by the Azande was divided by Belgium, France, and Anglo-Egyptian Sudan.

During his travels in the late 1870s, the Austrian photographer Richard Buchta took photographs of Azande that were used in European publications about Central Africa and constitute an important source of historical documentation.

The Azande are considered to be one of the last ethnic groups to move into the region and were the only group that did not engage in an agro-pastoral lifestyle. The Azande were considered skilled metalworkers in pre-colonial Sudan. Although the Azande did not originate in South Sudan, many other ethnic groups in the region also migrated into the region though the Azande's late arrival has made them the target of some cross-ethnic animosity.

=== Zande Scheme ===
In 1938, the Governor of Sudan ordered a survey of areas of modern-day South Sudan by Dr. J. D. Tothill, who previously oversaw agriculture in British Uganda, to evaluate the region's potential for agricultural production. The Azande region was selected for agricultural experimentation because it was designated as food secure. The British got tribal and Indigenous leaders to support the plan and attempted to run a propaganda campaign to urge the local community to abide by the Azande Scheme. The Scheme was organized to reduce reliance on imports and promote self-sufficiency. It emphasized growth and processing of valuable commodities for local use and export. The exports were supposed to pay for necessary imports. Originally hailed as a success by many scholars, the program largely failed, partly because of the Azande's relative isolation to trading ports and lack of sufficient infrastructure to bring in the machinery required to build a finishing and manufacturing sector in such a rural area. Additionally, the roads were not of adequate quality for exports and the British government deemed the prices too steep to justify. The project required extensive human and monetary capital investment which the British government realized was too substantial. Because of this isolation, many Azande have moved to towns closer to major roads.

Though the plan emphasized cotton, crops that maintained soil health were promoted and land was allocated specifically for palm oil production to assure substantial yield and quality. The plan included cattle farming which the British identified as deficient prior to the Zande Scheme. Experimental agriculture was introduced to eventually reduce cotton as the region's primary crop. Coupled with the agricultural development, the British built industrial infrastructure further north near Khartoum to process the cotton and export it. Though the plan eventually failed, its ambitions were to turn Sudan into a wealthy state by the 1970s and was initially regarded as being on track to reach or exceed the goal.

The plan's failures were attributed not only to lack of resources but failure to adequately train the population to shift from older agricultural methods. An immediate retrospective of the plan's failure pointed to lack of bureaucratic oversight in enforcing the tenets of the plan, leading to homestead mismanagement. When entrenched methods of farming proved increasingly difficult to dissuade, experimental farming techniques required additional investment to compensate for inefficiencies. These additional costs played a role in leading the British to abandon the project.

== Twenty-first century ==
In 2015, conflict between the Azande and the Dinka ethnic group in the city of Yambio, Western Equatoria state led SPLA chief Paul Malong Awan to instruct soldiers to open fire on anyone insubordinate to his directives. Awan implemented plans to soothe the situation in the region as ethnic tensions flared.

Amnesty International documented evidence of war crimes in 2021 as warring factions from the larger Dinka and Nuer ethnic groups attacked the Azande and Balanda Bviri ethnic groups from the Western Equatoria region. Additional conflict broke out between Azande and Balanda factions as well.

== Demographics ==
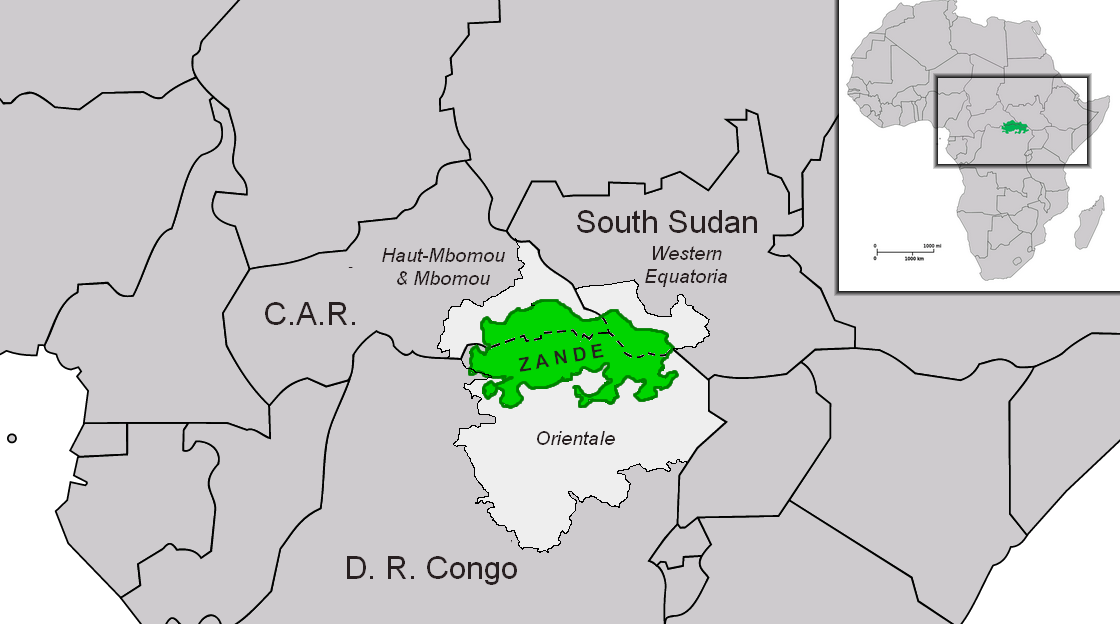
Location of Zande populations

The Azande population is spread over three Central African countries: South Sudan, the Democratic Republic of the Congo and the Central African Republic. Azande Kingdom extends from the fringes of the South-central and Southwest Upper basin of South Sudan to the semitropical rain forests in Congo, and into the Central African Republic.

Estimates of Azande speakers reported in SIL Ethnologue are 730,000 in the Democratic Republic of the Congo, 62,000 in the Central African Republic and 350,000 in South Sudan.

=== Settlements ===
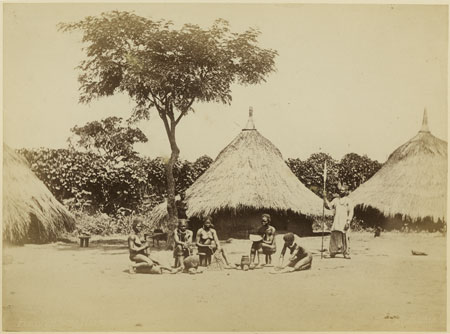
Women in front of traditional Azande homes, c. 1880

The types of houses that the Azande built were made from mud and grass, which they framed around wooden poles and thatched with grass. Each household was built around a courtyard so that they can gather and converse with each other. Adjacent to these courtyards were kitchen gardens that were for plants that did not require large scale farming such as pineapples and mangos.

In order to implement the Zande Scheme, the British sought to establish new settlements in the region, centered around cotton ginneries. In order to improve access throughout the region to encourage commutes between settlements in the region, the British contracted Azande laborers to modernize 100 miles of roadway and construct bridges to traverse rivers. The British also constructed agricultural training facilities and experimental farms in Yambio and pushed urbanization schemes in the region.

The British resettled 60,000 Azande people into newly constructed settlements of 50 families named gbarias. These settlements helped the British facilitate oversight concerning their plan's implementation as well as the development of academic and medical institutions. Families were given 25-40 acres of land and answered to a gbaria chief.

=== Social and political organizations ===
The Azande were organized into chiefdoms that can also be called kingdoms. The Avongara were the nobility and passed it down through their lineage. Chiefs many roles within the chiefdoms included being military, economic, and political leaders. All unmarried men were laborers and warriors.

Within the chiefdoms clan affiliation was not stressed as important at the local level. They had "local groups" that were similar to political organizations.

Colonial records described the Azande as "individualists" who, prior to villagization under the Zande Scheme, lived together in family groups on homesteads with women carrying out agricultural duties.

Sleeping sickness caused internal migrations and social reorganization among the Zande people, leading them to coalesce around paths of travel, which meant that they exhausted soil nutrients near thoroughfares.

== Agriculture ==
The Azande are mainly small-scale farmers. Crops include maize, rice, groundnuts (also known as peanuts), sesame, cassava, and sweet potatoes. Fruits grown in the area include mangos, oranges, bananas, pineapples, and also sugar cane. Zandeland is also full of palm oil and sesame. From 1998 to 2001, Zande agriculture was boosted since World Vision International bought agricultural produce.

The British colonial authority noted in 1948 the importation of mangoes into the Azande region from the Congo around the turn of the twentieth century. In the ensuing years, mangoes grew to prominence being planted throughout the Zande territory with "avenues" of trees surrounding many of the roads in the region around the middle of the twentieth century.

Since then, the Azande have hunted and have farmed millet, sorghum, and corn. Major cash crops include cassava and peanuts.

The region in which the Azande live has two seasons. During the rainy season the women and men both help get food from the river. Women help with the fishing in dammed streams and shallow pools collecting fish, snakes, and crustaceans. Men make and set up traps in the river to help with the collection of food. Another food that the Azande collect and eat is termites which are their favorites.

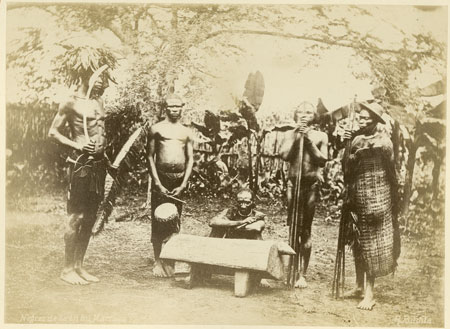
Zande men with musical instruments and weapons, 19th century

== Language and literature ==
The Azande speak Zande, which they call Pa-Zande, which has an estimated 1.1 million speakers. Zande is also used to refer to related languages in addition to Azande itself, including Adio, Barambu, Apambia, Geme, Kpatiri and Nzakara. Recorded Zande literature is mostly oral, some of it published by missionaries in the early twentieth century, and some of it translated in the 1960s.

== Visual culture and music ==
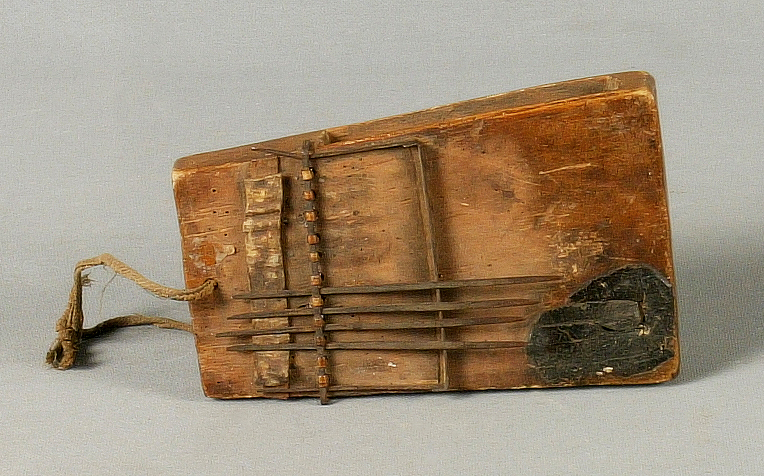
A Sansa thumb piano

As in other African societies, applied arts, artifacts, music and oral literature are key elements of Zande culture. They are most famously known for their throwing knives, called the "shongo". These show the skill of Zande metal workers with their curved and multi-bladed features. Their visual art includes sculptures made from wood or clay. Many of these represent important animals or ancestors. Zande also have created drums and thumb pianos, called sansa, that sometimes looked like people, animals, and abstract figures. These instruments were used at celebrations like marriages and community dances.

== Traditional beliefs and practices ==
=== Religion ===
Most Azande formerly practiced a traditional African religion, but this has been supplanted to a large extent by Christianity. Their traditional religion involves belief in Mbori, an omnipotent god. They practice magic, oracles, and witchcraft in order to solve their everyday problems. However, the late-nineteenth century marked the beginning of many Zande converting to Christianity. 85 percent of Azande consider themselves Christian, while 15 percent follow their traditional religion. More than half of Azande identify as Catholic.

Early missionaries to the Azande found it difficult to draw comparisons between Christian beliefs and the spiritual belief in "Mbori" who created the universe though did not play the role of God in Christianity. Folk stories of "tricksters" have helped establish a basis for social conduct and the consequences of violating social expectations. The Azande trickster, Ture, is representative of poor decisions and rash actions and serves as a deterrent against similar actions in the community.

The Azande use oracles in their religious traditions, with many different oracles serving unique purposes and carrying varying levels of repute within the larger community. The poison oracle in particular carried a reputation as being an important oracle to the Azande as that oracle, reserved exclusively for men, kept oral traditions and stories alive.

=== Witchcraft ===
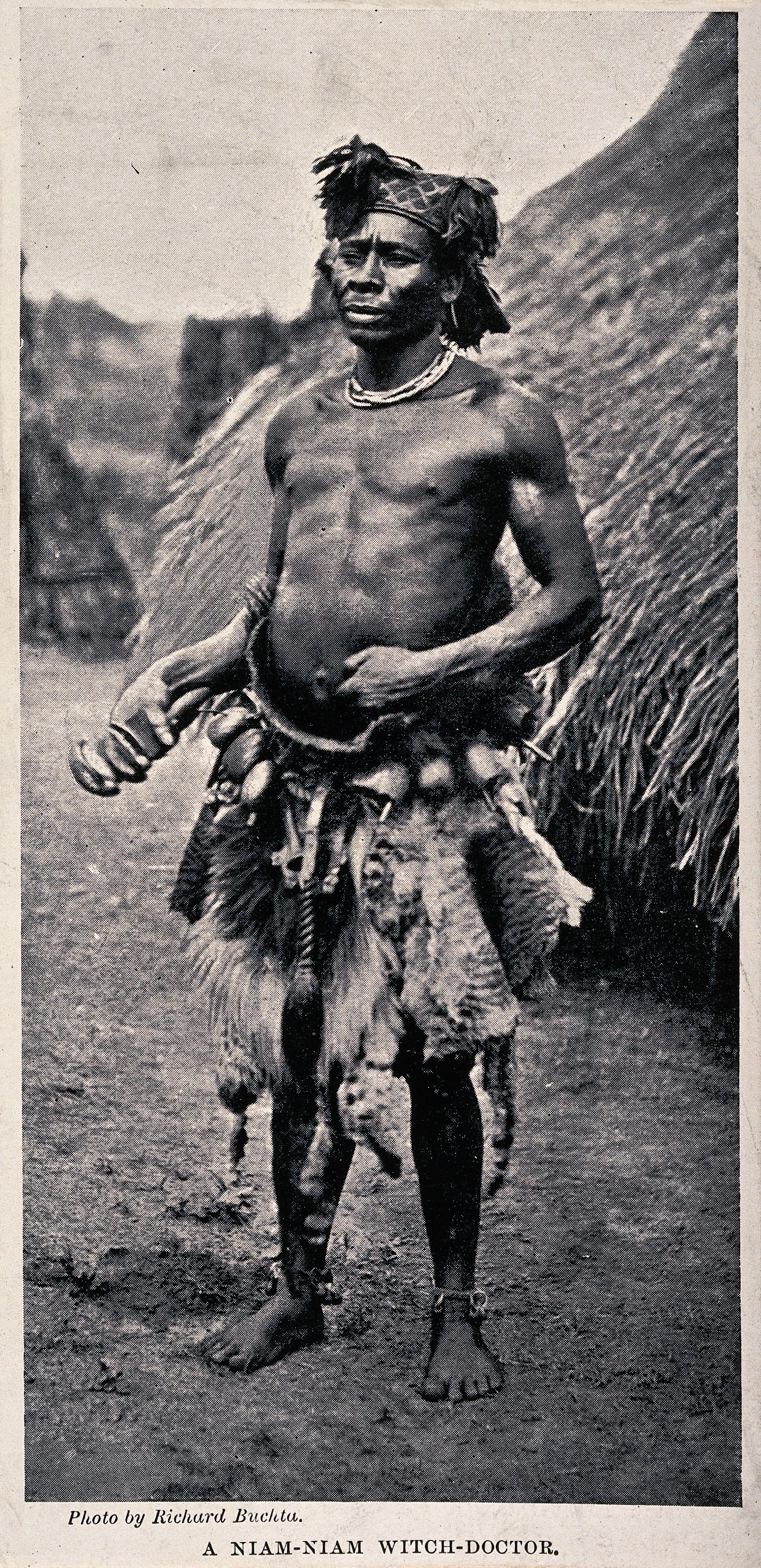
Zande "witch doctor" (medicine man), Equatorial Africa, by Richard Buchta

Other traditional beliefs include magic and witchcraft. Among the Azande, bad magic, or mangu, is believed to be an inherited black fluid in the belly which leads a fairly autonomous existence, and has power to perform bad magic on one's enemies. Since they believed that witchcraft is inherited, an autopsy of an accused witch would also prove that a particular living person, related to the deceased, was or was not a witch. Mangu is thought to be passed down from parent to child of the same sex — from father to son or from mother to daughter. Therefore, if a man were to be proven to possess witchcraft substance, this conclusion would extend to that man's father, sons, brothers, and so on.

The Azande rarely have a theoretical interest in witchcraft. What is important is whether a person at a particular point in time is acting as a witch toward a specific person. Witches can sometimes be unaware of their powers, and can accidentally strike people to whom the witch wishes no evil. In terms of death, the prince determined the vengeance placed on the witch or the killer. This could be done through physical killing of the witch, compensation, or lethal magic.

Because witchcraft is believed always to be present, there are several rituals connected to protection from and canceling of witchcraft that are performed almost daily. When something out of the ordinary occurs, usually something unfortunate, to an individual, the Azande may blame witchcraft, just as non-Zande people might blame "bad luck".

Although witchcraft is contained within the physical body, its action is psychic. The psychic aspect of mangu is the soul of witchcraft. It usually, but not always, leaves the physical body of the witch at night, when the victim is asleep, and is directed by the witch into the body of the victim. As it moves, it shines with a bright light that can be seen by anyone during the nighttime. However, during the day it can be seen only by religious specialists.

Oracles are a way of determining the source of the suspected witchcraft, and were for a long time the ultimate legal authority and the main determining factor in how one would respond to the threats. The Azande use three different types of oracles. The most powerful oracle is the "benge" poison oracle, which is used solely by men. The decisions of the oracle are always accepted and no one questions it. The less prestigious but more readily available is the termite oracle. Women, men, and children are all allowed to consult this oracle. The least expensive but also least reliable oracle is the rubbing-board oracle. The rubbing board oracle is described in Culture Sketches as "a device resembling a Ouija board, made of two small pieces of wood easily carried to be consulted anywhere, and at any time."

=== Sexuality ===
The Zande observed a sexual practice similar to pederasty in Ancient Greece. As the anthropologist E. E. Evans-Pritchard recorded in the northern Congo, due to the shortage of women in the region, male Zande warriors between 20 and 30 years of age routinely took on young male lovers between the ages of twelve and twenty, who participated in intercrural and anal sex with their older partners while also performing household duties. Once the younger partner was considered old enough to become a warrior himself, he received weapons and the relationship ended, with the older partner taking a female wife instead of the "boy wife". Some Zande princes may have preferred male partners. Men may have also slept with young boys because they were considered "disease-free". The practice had largely died out by the time of Evans-Pritchard's fieldwork in the 1920s, owing to European colonial influence in the region, but the elders Evans-Pritchard spoke to were still able to describe it in detail.

Evans-Pritchard also recorded information about sexual relationships between women, based on reports from male Azande. According to these informants, women took female lovers for pleasure, and the partners penetrated each other using bananas or sweet potatoes carved into the shape of a phallus. They also reported that rulers sometimes gave a daughter a slave girl as a sexual partner. Evans-Pritchard recorded that the male Azande were fearful of women taking on female lovers because they associated such relationships with witchcraft.

=== Cannibalism ===
Some Azande groups used to eat human flesh. Evans-Pritchard spoke with a number of elderly Azande, who all agreed (though sometimes with "embarrassment") that cannibalism had been practiced in former times. According to their testimony, the victims were usually killed or captured enemies and executed criminals, though occasionally members of subjected neighboring peoples were killed for consumption, as they were considered outside "the law" and without rights. Except for criminals, clan members were never eaten except in times of severe hunger, when girls were sometimes sacrificed to ensure the survival of the others – with families exchanging their daughters so that nobody had to eat their own child.

Evans-Pritchard found it impossible to determine how common cannibal customs had been in earlier times, but notes that they seem to have been quite rare during the lifetime of his informers – various older men had seen cases, but none described it as a general practice, not even during war campaigns. He also points out that customs differed and not all Azande clans engaged in cannibalism. The ruling Avongara clan clearly rejected the practice, but many other groups who came under their influence initially seem to have been cannibals, and Evans-Pritchard considers it credible that some of them continued this custom under Avongara rule, though the latter's disapproval may have caused it to become rarer.

According to Evans-Pritchard, there is no credible evidence that cannibalism was practiced in order to acquire the properties of an admired foe or for any other "ritual" or "magical" reason. As the only reasons he heard from Azande for eating human flesh were "either hunger, or more often, a taste for it", he concludes, in agreement with most other reports of the practice, that it "was eaten simply for meat".

The Italian missionary Filiberto Giorgetti, known as Gero, who had spent nearly 40 years among the Azande, published a book about their former cannibalism. He too notes that only some Azande clans had eaten people, especially in war or in order to punish criminals. His informants told him that the flesh of enemies had been eaten not only to celebrate one's victory over them, but also because other provisions were often hard to secure during war campaigns and because letting the human flesh behind to rot was considered needless waste. Captives were either eaten immediately or kept as slaves, but the latter could still be butchered and consumed as punishment, or when provisions got scarce during famines.

Among some clans it was also usual to kill and consume lonely individuals from unrelated neighboring groups (including other Azande clans) if an opportunity to do so arose. Most of the victims were women and children, because they were easier to subdue and because their flesh was considered tastier than that of men. According to Gero, though the Avongara did not practise cannibalism and disapproved of the custom among other Azande clans, they punished criminals by selling them to neighboring cannibal peoples who then killed and ate them.

== Notable people ==
- Charles-Armel Doubane, former foreign and education minister of Central African Republic
- James Nando, South Sudanese general
- Joseph James Tombura, former President of Southern Sudan Autonomous Region
- Joseph Bakosoro, former governor of Western Equatoria
- Jean-Pierre Déricoyard, Congolese politician and businessman
- Jean-Pierre Finant, former president of Orientale Province
- Jemma Nunu Kumba, speaker of the Transitional National Legislative Assembly

== Gallery ==
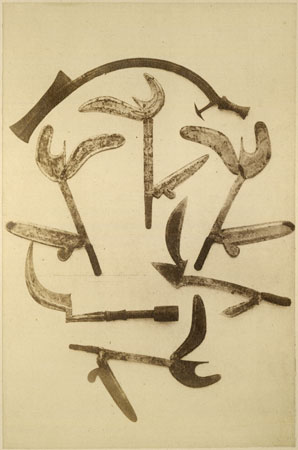
Zande throwing knives, 19th century

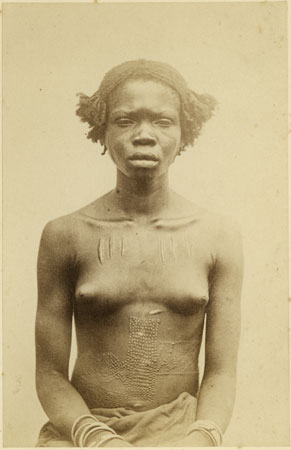
Zande woman, late 1870s, with skin scarifications

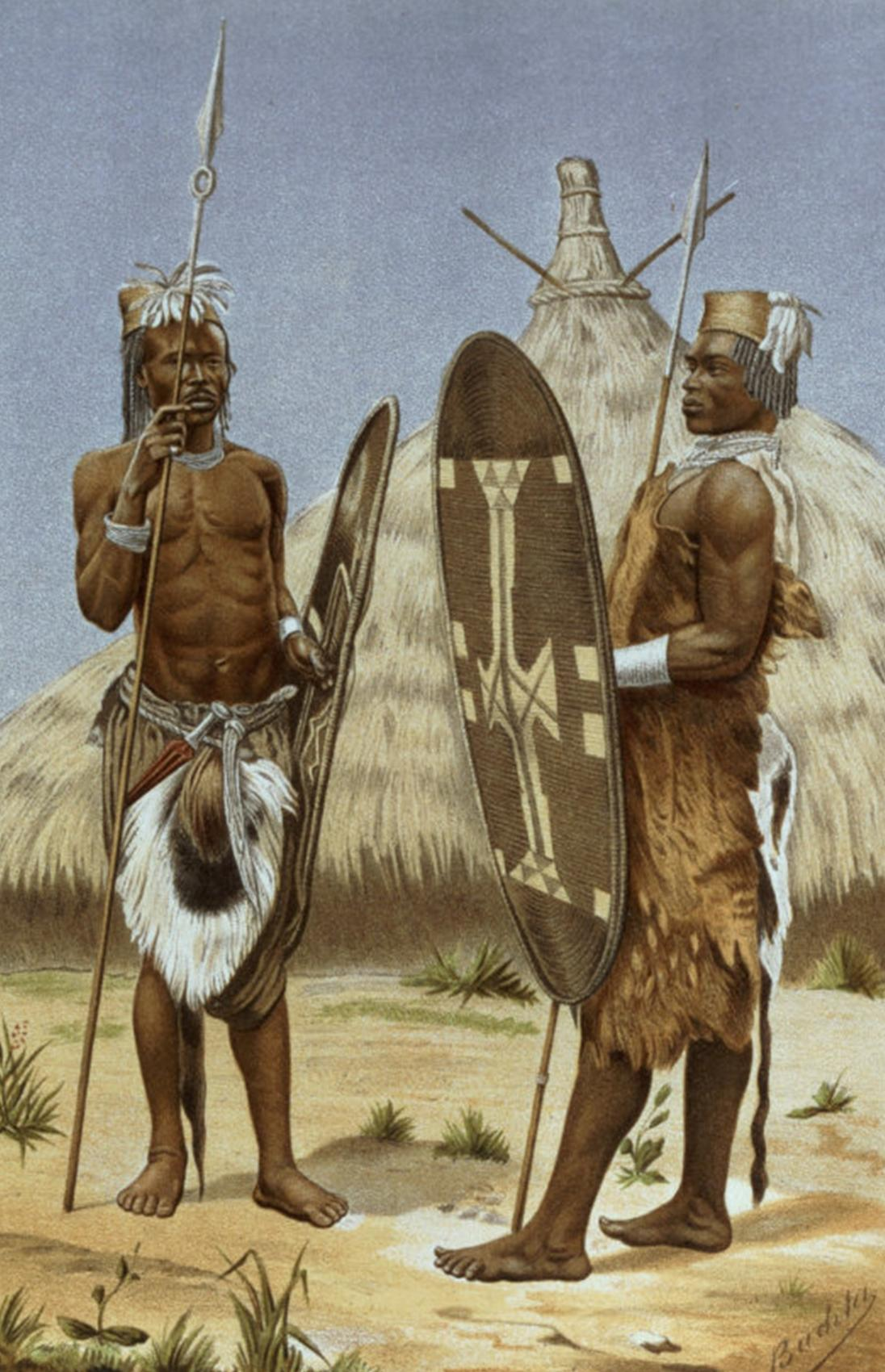
Azande warriors, painting from 1898

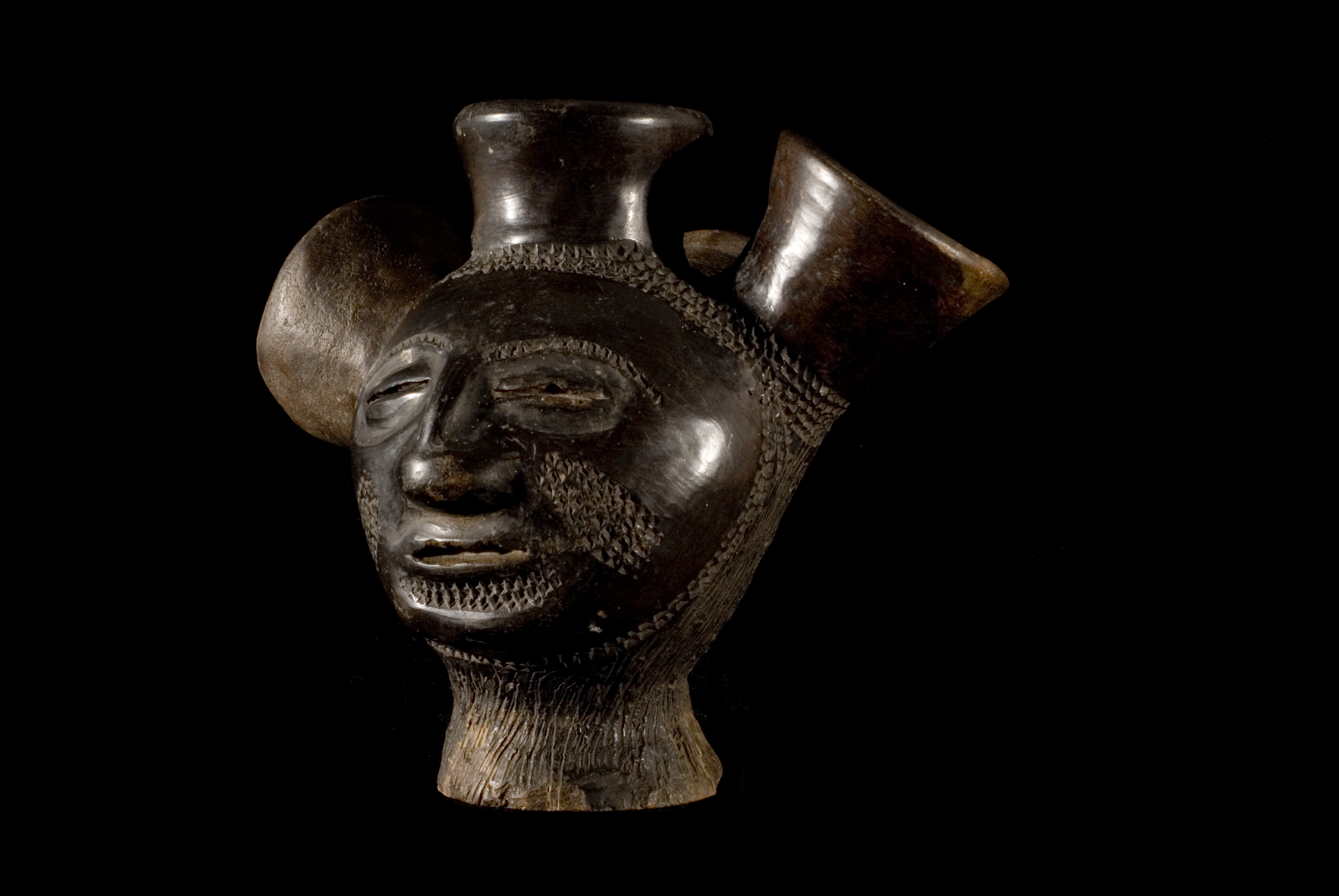
Vessel in the shape of a head, 20th century

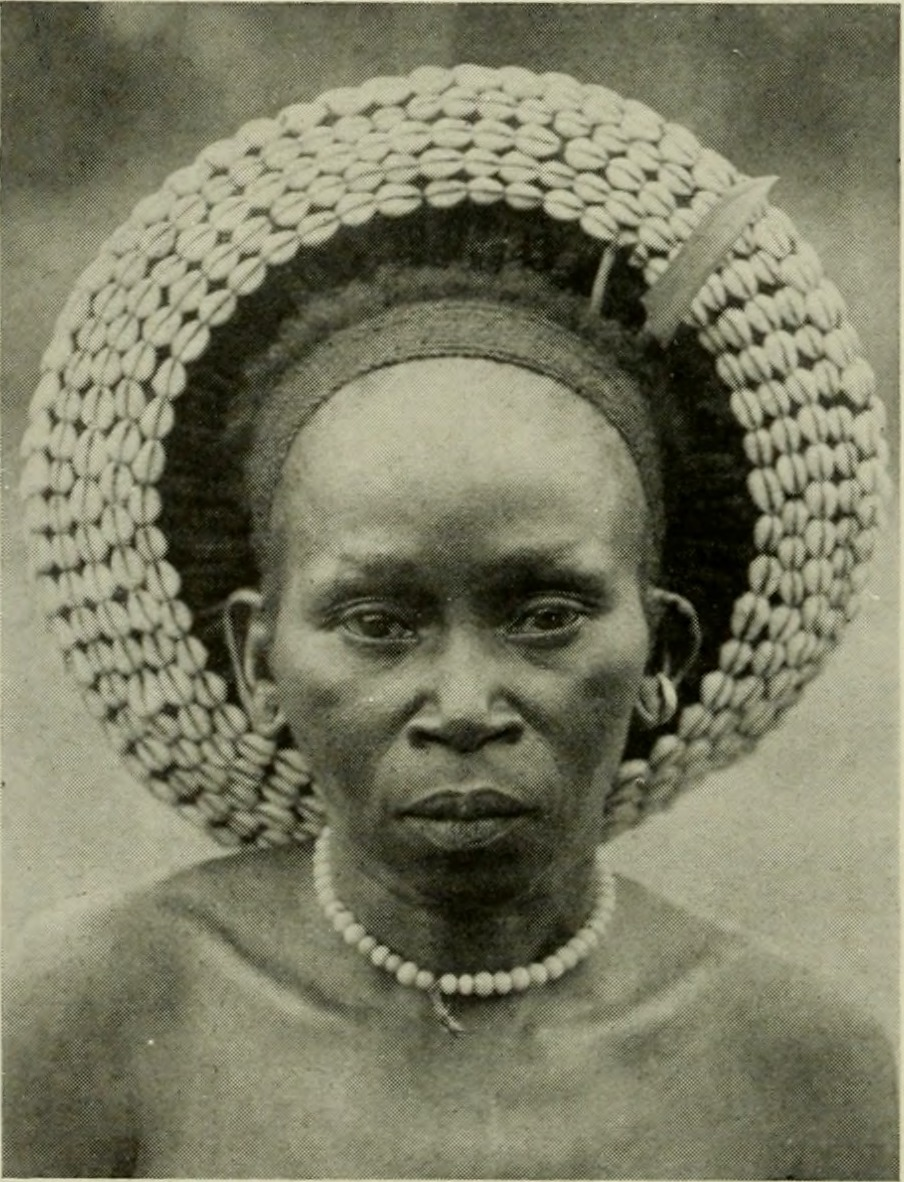
Zande woman

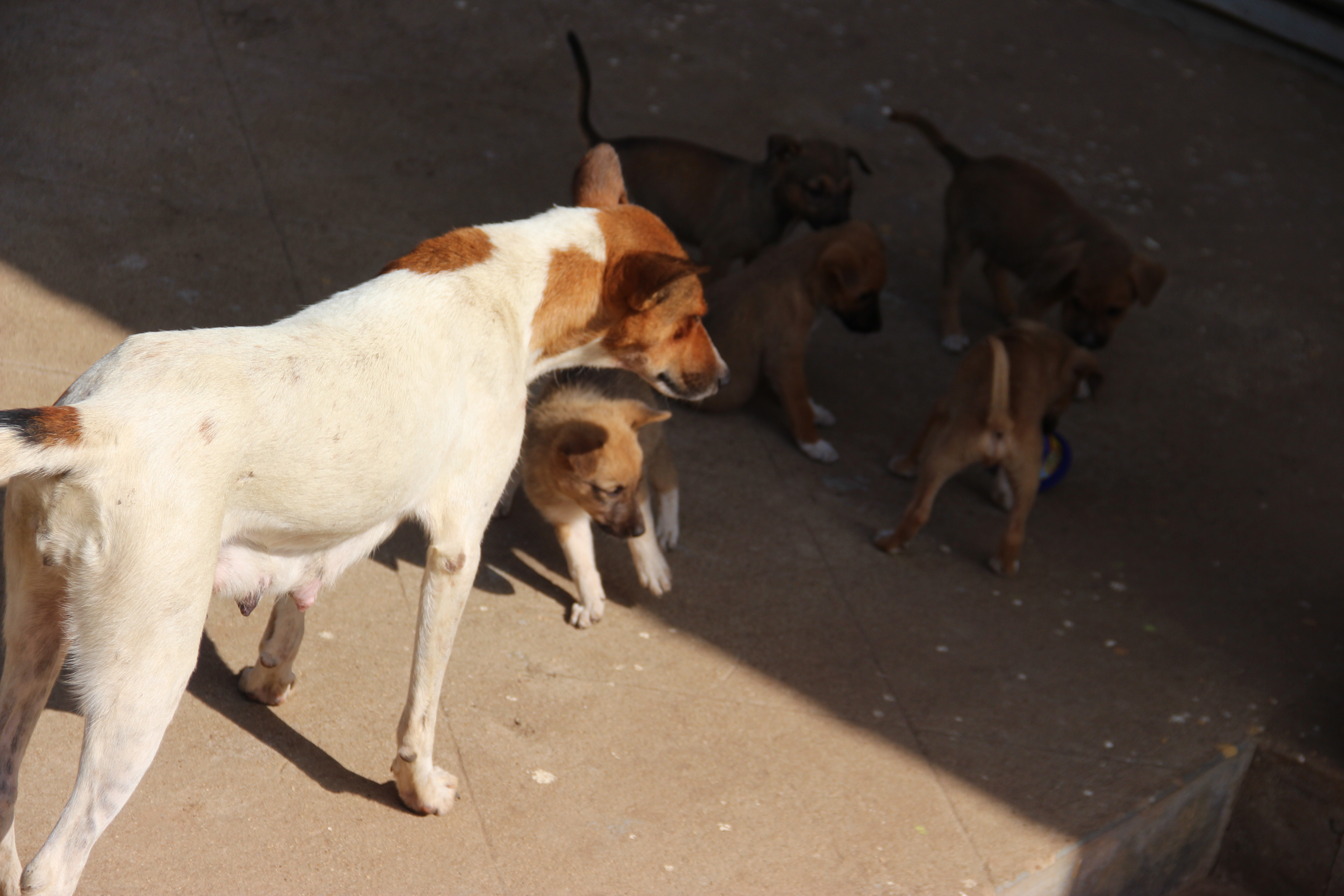
A dog, which Azande used to hunt for animals

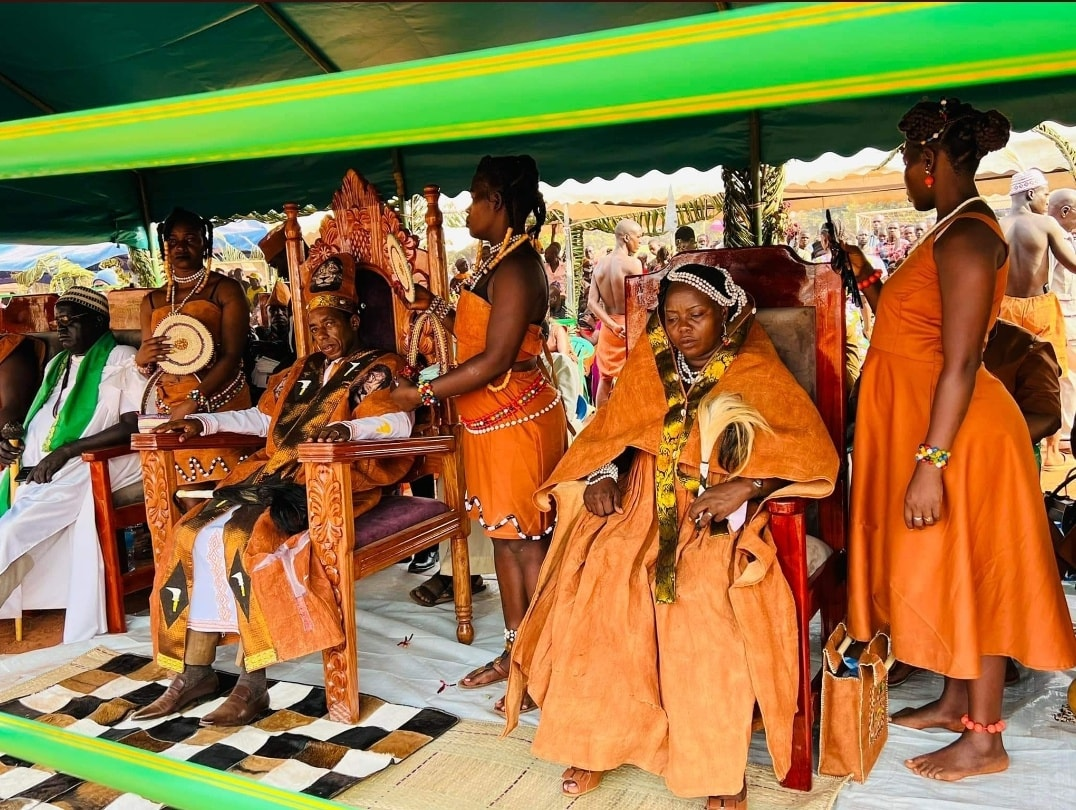
Azande King installed in February 2022

== See also ==
- Richard Buchta

== Works cited ==
- Appiah, Kwame Anthony; Gates, Henry Louis Jr., eds. (1999). "Azande". Africana: The Encyclopedia of the African and African American Experience (First ed.). Perseus Books. p. 156. ISBN 978-0-9650327-4-2.
- Evans-Pritchard, E. E. (1937). "Magic and Magicians". Witchcraft, Oracles and Magic Among the Azande. Oxford: The Clarendon Press. pp. 423–478.
- Evans-Pritchard, E. E. (1960). "Zande Cannibalism". The Journal of the Royal Anthropological Institute of Great Britain and Ireland. 90 (2): 238–258. doi:10.2307/2844346. ISSN 0307-3114. JSTOR 2844346.
- [Pseudonym of Filiberto Giorgetti] Gero, F. (1980). Cannibalism in Zandeland: Truth and Falsehood. Bologna: Editrice Missionaria Italiana.
- Rupp, Leila J. (2009). "In Unlikely Places – In Women's Spaces". Sapphistries: A Global History of Love between Women. New York: New York University Press. pp. 49–63. ISBN 9780814776445.
- Seligman, C. G. (1937). "Foreword". Witchcraft, Oracles and Magic among the Azande by E. E. Evans-Pritchard. Oxford: The Clarendon Press. pp. xv–xxv.
