= Yambio =

Yambio Burekiwe
- City
- Location in South Sudan
- Coordinates: 04°33′54″N 28°22′30″E
- Country: South Sudan
- Region: Equatoria
- State: Western Equatoria
- County: Yambio County
- Established: 1800's
- Elevation: 650 m (2,130 ft)

Population (2014 est.)
  - Total: 45,685
  - Ethnicities: Multi-Ethnicities but Azande are known to be the majority
  - Religions: Christianity Islam Traditional African Religions
- Time zone: UTC+2 (CAT)

Yambio is a city in South Sudan named after King Mbio of the Azande Kingdom.

== Location ==
The city is located in Yambio County, Western Equatoria State, in southwestern South Sudan, close to the border with the Democratic Republic of Congo. Its location lies approximately 444 kilometres (276 mi), by road, west of Juba Capital City of South Sudan.

== Overview ==
Yambio is the headquarters of Yambio County, in which it lies. It is also the largest City of Western Equatoria State, one of the 10 states that constitute the Republic of South Sudan. Following the attainment of independence by South Sudan in 2011, the main current concerns in Yambio include the following:

- Resettlement of new South Sudanese returnees especially from the Republic of Sudan, but also from other countries such as the Democratic Republic of the Congo, the Central African Republic, and Uganda.
- Security enhancement against the marauding Ugandan rebels known as the Lord's Resistance Army (LRA), who have terrorized the region for the past decade or so.
- Ensuring that the old residents and new returnees have enough food, now and in the future.

== Population and demographics ==
Yambio and the surrounding communities are the ancestral home of the Azande ethnic group, who also inhabit in neighboring countries of The Democratic Republic of the Congo and The Central African Republic. Apart from the Azande, other tribes in Yambio county include the Balanda, Mundu and Morokodo.

In 1983, the Sudanese national census estimated the population of Yambio to be approximately 24,900 people. In 2010, it was estimated that the town's population had risen to about 31,700 people. In 2011, another source estimated the population of the town at about 45,400. The table below summarizes the population trends of the town, from all sources, for the last 40 years:

Year	Population
1983 (Census)	24,900
2010 (Estimate)	31,700
2011 (Estimate)	45,400

== Transport ==
The main highways that passes through Yambio is A44-NW northbound to Ri Rangu. A44-W leads to Nzara, Ezo on the border with the Central African Republic, and Tambura. A44-E joins A43 which goes east to Maridi and further east to South Sudan's capital city Juba. A44SE branches off at A44-East in Maridi, and goes southeast to the town of Yei, in Yei River County, Central Equatoria State. A44-S goes to the town of Nabiapai on the border to The Democratic Republic of the Congo and The Republic South Sudan. Yambio is also served by Yambio Airport (HSYA).

== Education ==
Over 500 children in Yambio in Western Equatoria now have access to learning facilities following the opening of a new four-classroom building of the United Nursery and Primary School.

These students had to walk an 8-kilometre round trip to fetch water before the new borehole was constructed in the school.

== Points of interest ==
The following points of interest are located in Yambio or near the city limits:

- The offices of Yambio City Council
- The headquarters of Yambio County
- The headquarters of Western Equatoria State
- Yambio Airport - Civil Airport
- Royal Palace of the Azande Kingdom
- A branch of Equity Bank (South Sudan) - A licensed commercial bank
- The grave of King Gdudwe.
- All saints cathedral Timbiro.
- Gbudwe football stadium.
- Yambio Open Market

== Climate ==
Month	Jan	Feb	Mar	Apr	May	Jun	Jul	Aug	Sep	Nov	Oct	Dec	Year
Record high °C (°F)	41.47(106.65)	44.43(111.97)	42.46(108.43)	40.48(104.86)	39.5(103.1)	34.56(94.21)	34.56(94.21)	34.56(94.21)	33.57(92.43)	34.56(94.21)	36.53(97.75)	38.51(101.32)	44.43(111.97)
Average high °C (°F)	35.55(95.99)	36.55(97.79)	35.22(95.4)	33.17(91.71)	30.33(86.59)	28.7(83.66)	27.91(82.24)	28.14(82.65)	28.57(83.43)	28.87(83.97)	30.47(86.85)	33.97(93.15)	31.46(88.63)
Daily mean °C (°F)	29.77(85.59)	30.94(87.69)	29.76(85.57)	27.91(82.24)	25.98(78.76)	24.91(76.84)	24.27(75.69)	24.41(75.94)	24.77(76.59)	25.12(77.22)	26.26(79.27)	28.74(83.73)	26.91(80.44)
Average low °C (°F)	21.89(71.4)	23.44(74.19)	22.39(72.3)	21.11(70.0)	19.95(67.91)	19.29(66.72)	18.9(66.02)	18.74(65.73)	18.92(66.06)	19.53(67.15)	20.09(68.16)	21.32(70.38)	20.47(68.85)
Record low °C (°F)	13.82(56.88)	15.8(60.44)	17.77(63.99)	17.77(63.99)	15.8(60.44)	16.79(62.22)	14.81(58.66)	14.81(58.66)	13.82(56.88)	16.79(62.22)	16.79(62.22)	15.8(60.44)	13.82(56.88)
Average precipitation mm (inches)	8.13(0.32)	38.24(1.51)	118.89(4.68)	168.8(6.65)	286.47(11.28)	286.14(11.27)	276.67(10.89)	317.26(12.49)	305.16(12.01)	400.25(15.76)	177.19(6.98)	24.81(0.98)	200.67(7.9)
Average precipitation days (≥ 1.0 mm)	1.8	4.31	12.39	19.3	24.68	26.75	27.91	28.63	27.38	27.1	16.79	3.95	18.42
Average relative humidity (%)	26.83	30.98	48.71	65.28	78.41	82.57	84.0	84.91	84.12	82.54	69.1	38.81	64.68
Mean monthly sunshine hours	11.44	11.37	11.16	11.65	12.08	11.92	11.0	10.47	11.64	10.32	10.87	9.49	11.12

== See also ==
- Yambio Airport
- EPA
- Central Equatoria
- Eastern Equatoria
- Western Equatoria
- Equatoria
- Gbudwe State
