= E. E. Evans-Pritchard =

British anthropologist (1902–1973)

Sir E. E. Evans-Pritchard
- Born: Edward Evan Evans-Pritchard; 21 September 1902; Crowborough, East Sussex, England
- Died: 11 September 1973 (aged 70); Oxford, England
- Known for: Evans-Pritchard's theories of religion Witchcraft, Oracles and Magic Among the Azande
- Children: Ambrose Evans-Pritchard
- Scientific career
- Fields: Anthropology
- Thesis: The social organisation of the Azande of the Bahr-el-Ghazal province of the Anglo-Egyptian Sudan (1928)
- Notable students: M. N. Srinivas; Talal Asad; Mary Douglas; Audrey Colson; John Francis Marchment Middleton; Steven Lukes; André Singer

E. E. Evans-Pritchard with a group of Zande boys in Sudan. Picture taken in the period 1926–1930

Sir Edward Evan Evans-Pritchard FBA FRAI (21 September 1902 – 11 September 1973) was an English anthropologist who was instrumental in the development of social anthropology. He was Professor of Social Anthropology at the University of Oxford from 1946 to 1970.

== Education and field work ==
Evans-Pritchard was educated at Winchester College and studied history at Exeter College, Oxford, where he was influenced by R. R. Marett, and then as a postgraduate at the London School of Economics (LSE). His doctoral thesis (1928) was titled "The social organization of the Azande of the Bahr-el-Ghazal province of the Anglo-Egyptian Sudan".

At Oxford, he was part of the Hypocrites' Club. At LSE, he came under the influence of Bronisław Malinowski and especially Charles Gabriel Seligman, the founding ethnographer of the Sudan. His first fieldwork began in 1926 with the Azande, a people of the upper Nile, and resulted in both a doctorate (in 1927) and his classic Witchcraft, Oracles and Magic Among the Azande (1937). Evans-Pritchard continued to lecture at the LSE and conduct research in Azande and Bongo land until 1930, when he began a new research project among the Nuer.

This work coincided with his appointment to the University of Cairo in 1932, where he gave a series of lectures on religion that bore Seligman's influence. After his return to Oxford, he continued his research on Nuer. It was during this period that he first met Meyer Fortes and A. R. Radcliffe-Brown. Evans-Pritchard began developing Radcliffe-Brown's program of structural-functionalism. As a result, his trilogy of works on the Nuer (The Nuer (1940), Kinship and Marriage Among the Nuer (1951), and Nuer Religion (1956)) and the volume he coedited with Meyer Fortes entitled African Political Systems (1940) came to be seen as classics of British social anthropology. Evans-Pritchard's Witchcraft, Oracles and Magic Among the Azande is the first major anthropological contribution to the sociology of knowledge through its neutral — some would say "relativist" — stance on the "correctness" of Zande beliefs about causation. His work focused in on a known psychological effect known as psychological attribution. Evans-Pritchard recorded the tendencies of Azandes to blame or attribute witchcraft as the cause of various mishaps. The most notable of these issues involved the deaths of eight Azande people due to the collapse of a termite infested door frame. Evans-Pritchard's empirical work in this vein became well known through philosophy of science and "rationality" debates of the 1960s and 1970s involving Thomas Kuhn and especially Paul Feyerabend.

During the Second World War Evans-Pritchard served in Ethiopia, Libya, Sudan, and Syria. In Sudan he raised irregular troops among the Anuak to harass the Italians and engaged in guerrilla warfare. In 1942, he was posted to the British Military Administration of Cyrenaica in North Africa, and it was on the basis of his experience there that he produced The Sanusi of Cyrenaica. In documenting local resistance to Italian conquest, he became one of a few English-language authors to write about the tariqa.

After a brief stint in Cambridge, Evans-Pritchard became professor of social anthropology at the University of Oxford and a Fellow of All Souls College. He remained at All Souls College for the rest of his career. Among the doctoral students he advised was the late M. N. Srinivas, the doyen among India's sociologists who coined some of the key concepts in Indian sociological discourse, including "Sanskritization", "dominant caste" and "vote bank." One of his students was Talal Asad, who now teaches at the City University of New York. Mary Douglas's classic Purity and Danger on pollutions and uncertainty — what we often denote as 'risk' — was fundamentally influenced by Evans-Pritchard's views on how accusations, blame and responsibility are deployed though culturally specific conceptions of misfortune and harm.

== Later theories ==
Evans-Pritchard's later work was more theoretical, drawing upon his experiences as an anthropologist to philosophise on the nature of anthropology and how it should best be practised. In 1950, he famously disavowed the commonly held view that anthropology was a natural science, arguing instead that it should be grouped among the humanities, especially history. He argued that the main issue facing anthropologists was one of translation—finding a way to translate one's own thoughts into the world of another culture and thus manage to come to understand it, and then to translate this understanding back so as to explain it to people of one's own culture.

In 1965, he published the highly influential work Theories of Primitive Religion, arguing against the existing theories of what at the time were called "primitive" religious practices. Arguing along the lines of his theoretical work of the 1950s, he claimed that anthropologists rarely succeeded in entering the minds of the people they studied, and so ascribed to them motivations which more closely matched themselves and their own culture, not the one they were studying. He also argued that believers and non-believers approached the study of religion in vastly different ways, with non-believers being quicker to come up with biological, sociological, or psychological theories to explain religion as an illusion, and believers being more likely to come up with theories explaining religion as a method of conceptualising and relating to reality.

== Life and family ==
Edward Evan Evans-Pritchard was born in Crowborough, East Sussex, England, the son of an Anglican cleric. He converted to Roman Catholicism in 1944.

Known to his friends and family as "EP", Evans-Pritchard had five children with his wife Ioma, including journalist Ambrose Evans-Pritchard, another writer and film festival director Deirdre Evans-Pritchard and Shineen Galloway, founder of EPG Computer Services. Some notable grandchildren are Ruth Galloway of the Mediæval Bæbes choral group and Suriya Jayanti, a diplomat and journalist and documentary filmmaker Hannah Jayanti.

Evans-Pritchard died in Oxford on 11 September 1973.

== Honours ==
A Rivers Memorial Medal recipient (1937) and of the Huxley Memorial Medal (1963) he was President of the Royal Anthropological Institute of Great Britain and Ireland from 1949 to 1951. He was elected to the American Academy of Arts and Sciences in 1958 and the American Philosophical Society in 1968. Evans-Pritchard was knighted in 1971. A number of Festschriften were prepared for him:

- Essays in Sudan Ethnography: presented to Sir Edward Evans-Pritchard
- The Translation of Culture: Essays to E. E. Evans-Pritchard (London: Tavistock, 1973)
- Studies in Social Anthropology: Essays in Memory of E. E. Evans-Pritchard by His Former Oxford Colleagues (eds. J. H. M. Beattie and R. G. Lienhardt; Oxford: Clarendon Press, 1975)

== Gallery ==
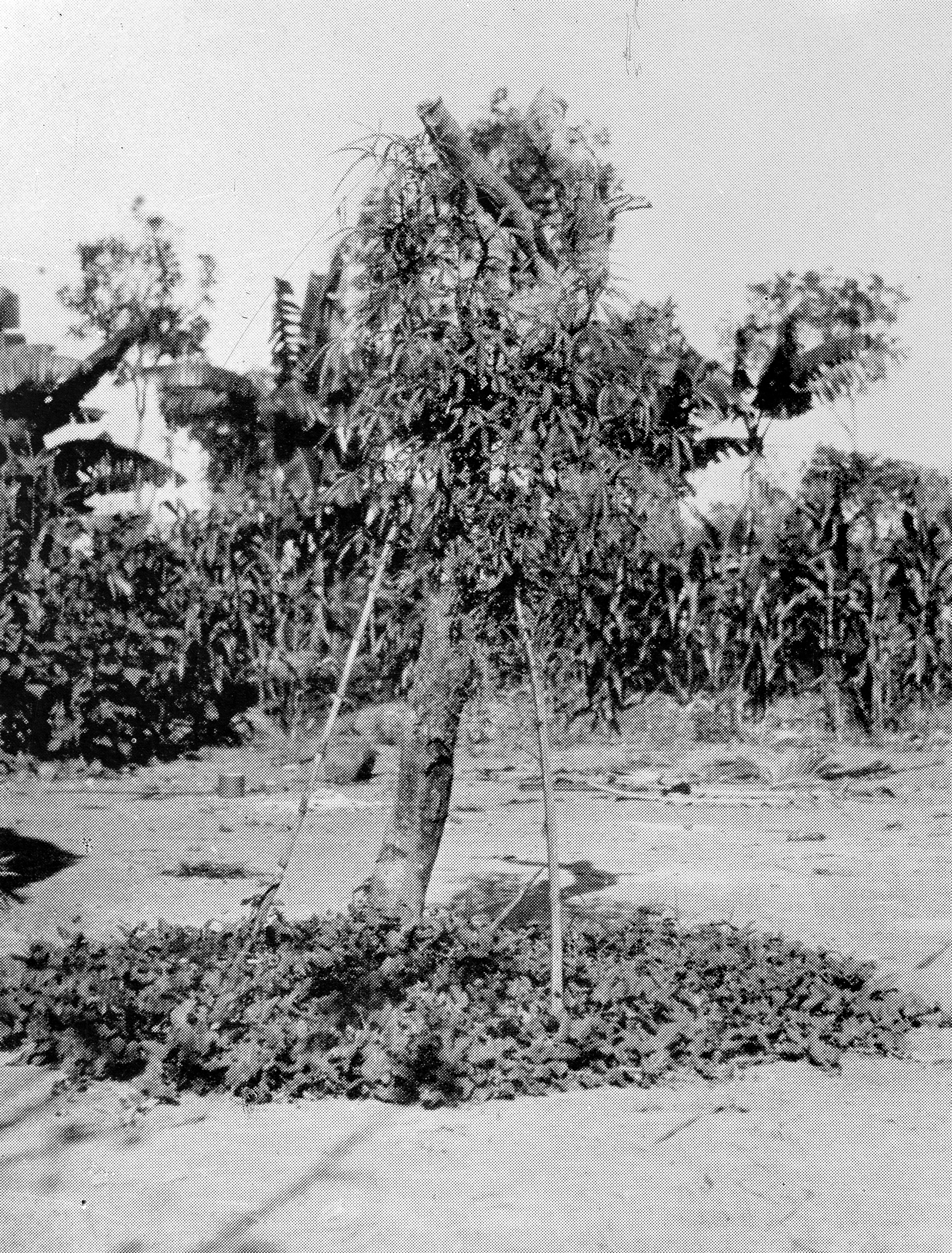
Eleusine, used in Amatangi magic, drying by a small tree. Photo by Evans-Pritchard

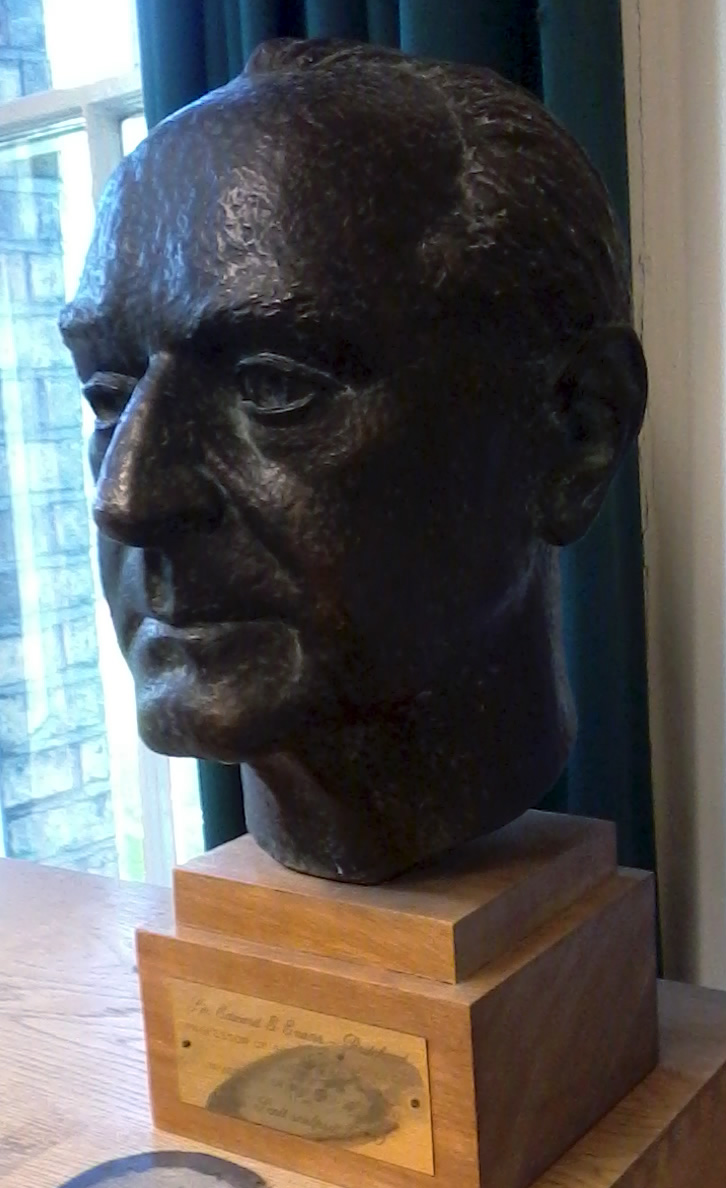
Bust of Evans-Pritchard

== Bibliography ==
- 1937 Witchcraft, Oracles and Magic Among the Azande. Oxford University Press. 1976 abridged edition: ISBN 0-19-874029-8
- 1940a The Nuer: A Description of the Modes of Livelihood and Political Institutions of a Nilotic People. Oxford: Clarendon Press.
- 1940b "The Nuer of the Southern Sudan". in African Political Systems. M. Fortes and E.E. Evans-Pritchard, eds., London: Oxford University Press., pp. 272–296.
- 1949 The Sanusi of Cyrenaica. London: Oxford: Oxford University Press.
- 1951a Kinship and Marriage Among the Nuer. Oxford: Clarendon Press.
- 1951b "Kinship and Local Community among the Nuer". in African Systems of Kinship and Marriage. A.R. Radcliffe-Brown and D. Forde, eds., London: Oxford University Press. p. 360–391.
- Evans-Pritchard, E. E. (July 1953), "The Sacrificial Role of Cattle among the Nuer" (PDF), Africa: Journal of the International African Institute, 23 (3), Edinburgh University Press: 181–198, doi:10.2307/1156279, JSTOR 1156279, S2CID 145328497
- 1956 Nuer Religion. Oxford: Clarendon Press.
- 1962 Social Anthropology and Other Essays. New York: The Free Press. BBC Third Programme Lectures, 1950.
- 1965 Theories of Primitive Religion. Oxford University Press. ISBN 0-19-823131-8
- 1967 The Zande Trickster. Oxford: Clarendon Press.
- 1971 La femme dans les societés primitives et autres essais d'anthropologie sociale. Paris: Presses Universitaires de France.
- "Sources, with Particular Reference to the Southern Sudan", Cahiers d'études africaines, 11 (41): 129–179, 1971
- 1974 Man and Woman Among the Azande New York: Free Press.

== Legacy: The Evans-Pritchard Lectures ==
The Evans-Pritchard Lectureship at All Souls College, Oxford, was established in 1998 in his memory.

The disciplines and areas covered by the annual Lecturers are those that interested Evans-Pritchard: social anthropology, classical studies, modern history, Asian and Middle Eastern studies and in Africa, the Middle East, the Mediterranean.

The rubric for the lectures is that they "should provide an empirical analysis of social relations, and should be based on fieldwork or on indigenous primary materials" (see ref above).

Many of the lecturers have published the contents as academic monographs and are now holders of posts in various universities round the world.

== A list of the lecturers and titles ==
List of lecturers and titles
Year	Lecturer (Affiliation)	Title
Michaelmas Term 1999	Dr Akira Okazaki (SOAS)	'Recapturing the Shadow – Dream consciousness and power in the borderland between North and South Sudan'
Michaelmas Term 2000	Dr Timothy Jenkins (Jesus College, Cambridge)	House, Family and Property in Béarn, South West France' Later published
Michaelmas Term 2001	Dr Roy Dilley (St Andrews)	'Between the Mosque and the Termite Mound: An Investigation into Social and Religious Difference among Haalpulaaren, Senegal'
Michaelmas Term 2002	Dr David M. Anderson (St Antony's College, Oxford)	'Histories of the Hanged: Testimony from the Mau Mau Rebellion, 1952-60'. Later published
Michaelmas Term 2003	Dr David Zeitlyn (University of Kent)	'Sample of One: Diko Madelene – A Senior Mambila Woman's Life in the 20th Century'
Michaelmas Term 2004	Dr Keith Brown (Watson Inst, Brown Univ)	'The Structure of Loyalty in Revolutionary Macedonia'
Michaelmas Term 2005	Dr Kai Kresse (St Andrews)	Swahili Intellectual Practice and Everyday Life: Discourses of Islam and Muslim Identity in Postcolonial Mombasa' Later published
Trinity Term 2007	Dr Anna Baldinetti (University of Perugia)	'Writing the History of Modern Libya: Key Issues on Historiographies'
Trinity Term 2008	Dr Richard Vokes (Univ. of Canterbury, NZ)	'Secret networks and major misfortunes: an historical anthropology of "crisis" in the Great Lakes region'. Later published, see Ghosts of Kanungu
Trinity Term 2009	Dr Judith Scheele (All Souls College, Oxford)	'Smugglers and Shurafâ': Saharan connectivity and the moral unity of the Central Sahara'
Trinity Term 2010	Dr Charles Stewart (University College London)	'Dreaming and Historical Consciousness in Island Greece' See published version
Trinity Term 2011	Dr Henrik Vigh (Copenhagen University)	'Critical States and Cocaine Connections: Figuring the State of Decay in Bissau'
Trinity Term 2012	Dr Christina Riggs (University of East Anglia)	'Unwrapping Ancient Egypt: The Shroud, the Secret, and the Sacred'
Trinity Term 2013	Dr Zuzanna Olszewska (London School of Economics and Politics)	'Verses, Modern Selves: An Ethnography of Afghan Refugee Poetry and Personhood in Iran.' Later published as 'The Pearl of Dari Poetry and Personhood among Young Afghans in Iran'
Trinity Term 2014	Dr Philippa Steele (University of Cambridge)	'Society and Writing in Ancient Cyprus' Later published by Cambridge UP
Trinity Term 2015	Dr Hélène Neveu Kringelbach (University of Oxford)	'Transnational Intimacies and the Reconfiguration of Relatedness in Senegal'
Trinity Term 2016	Dr Benedetta Rossi (University of Birmingham)	'Slavery and Emancipation in Twentieth-Century Africa'
Trinity Term 2017	Dr Naor Ben-Yehoyada (Columbia University)	'Getting Cosa Nostra: Knowledge and Criminal Justice in Southwestern Sicily'
Trinity Term 2018	Dr Emmanuelle Honoré (University of Cambridge)	'Saharan Rock Art: An Archaeology of relational Ontologies in North African Prehistory'
Trinity Term 2019	Dr Alice Elliot (Goldsmiths)	'The Outside: Migration as Life in Morocco'
Trinity Term 2020 postponed to Trinity Term 2021	Dr Marlene Schäfers (University of Ghent)	'Voices That Matter: Kurdish Women and Affective Politics in Turkey'
Trinity Term 2022	Professor Mark Fathi Massoud (University of California, Santa Cruz)	'A Legal Politics of Religion: Building an Islamic Rule of Law in the Horn of Africa'
Trinity Term 2023	Dr Lys Alcayna-Stevens (Marie Skłodowska–Curie Postdoctoral Fellow; Katholieke Universiteit Leuven)	The 'Owners of Ebola'
Trinity Term 2024	Dr Saibu Mutaru (Lecturer in Anthropology, University of Cape Coast, Ghana)	'Naming the Witch, Housing the Witch, and Living with Witchcraft: An Ethnography of Ordinary Lives in Northern Ghana's "Witch Camps"'
Trinity Term 2025	Dr Clayton Goodgame (Yale University)	
