= Deim Zubeir =

Deim Zubeir Uyujuku
- Town
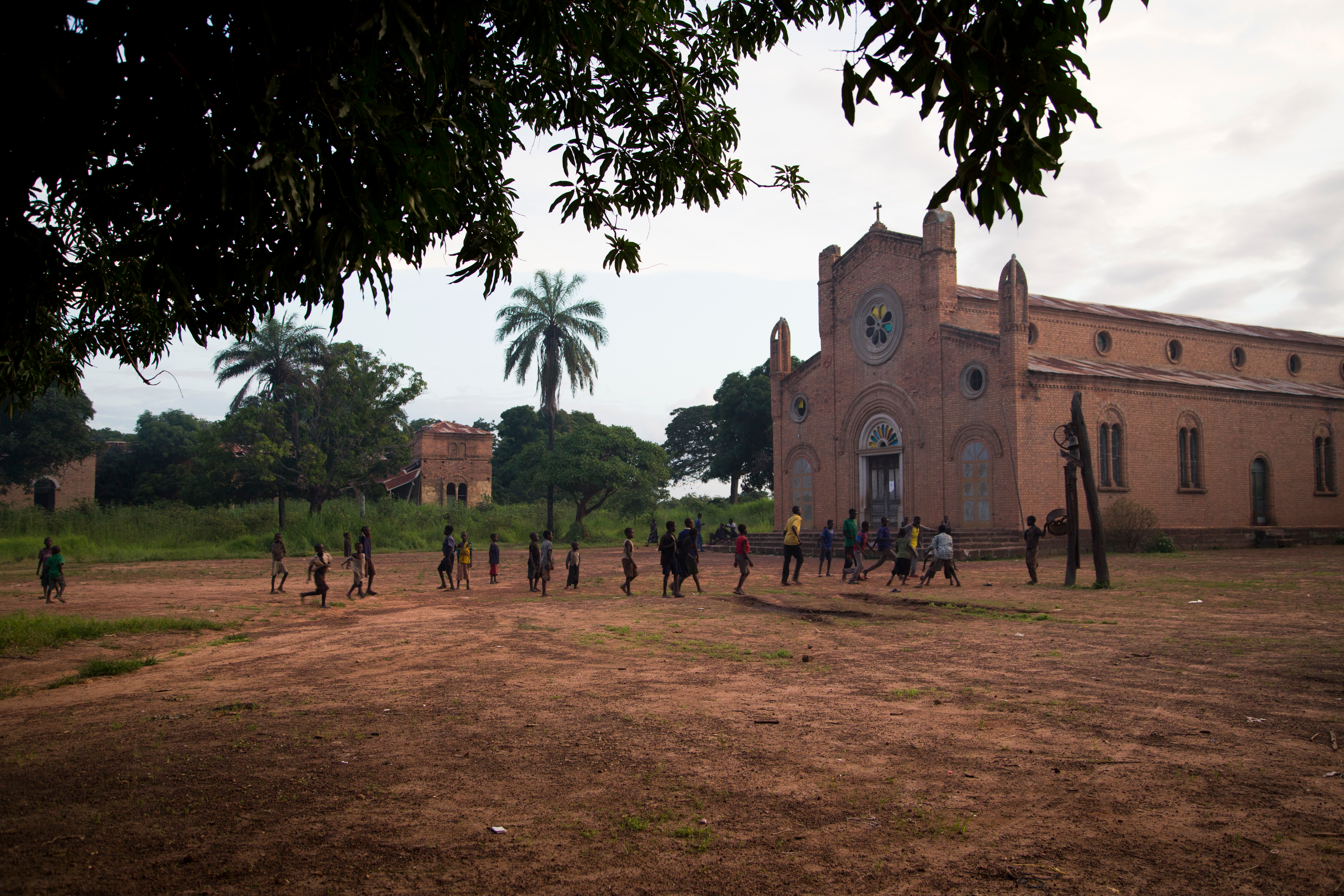
- The old church in 2017 (from the ICRC Archives)

- Location in South Sudan
- Coordinates: 7°43′N 26°13′E
- Country: South Sudan
- State: Western Bahr el Ghazal
- County: Raga County
- Payam: Kuru
- Boma: Uyujuku
- Time zone: UTC+2 (CAT)

Deim Zubeir, from the Arabic ديم الزبير ["Daim az-Zubayr"], commonly translated as the "Camp of Zubeir", is the historically established but highly controversial name of Uyujuku town in the Western Bahr el Ghazal of the Republic of South Sudan, located in the Western Bahr El Ghazal part of the country, some 70 km from the border with the Central African Republic (CAR), near the Biri tributary of the River Chel.

Due to different transliterations from the Arabic, the name components are also spelled in various combinations Dem, Dehm, Deym, Dam, Daym or Daim, and Zubair, Zubayr, Zoubair, Zoubeir, Zoubayr, Zobeir, Ziber, Zebehr, or Zubier, respectively.

The historical remains of the slave camp have been designated a potential UNESCO World Heritage Centre site. In the collective memory of South Sudanese people, the very name Deim Zubeir rings as a synonym for millennia of slavery, at least since Pharaonic times.

Stefano Santandrea (1966) had written a lexicon and grammatical sketch of the Mboto dialect of the Birri language as spoken in Deim Zubeir.

== History ==
=== Domination by the Dar Fur Sultanate (18th to mid-19th century) ===
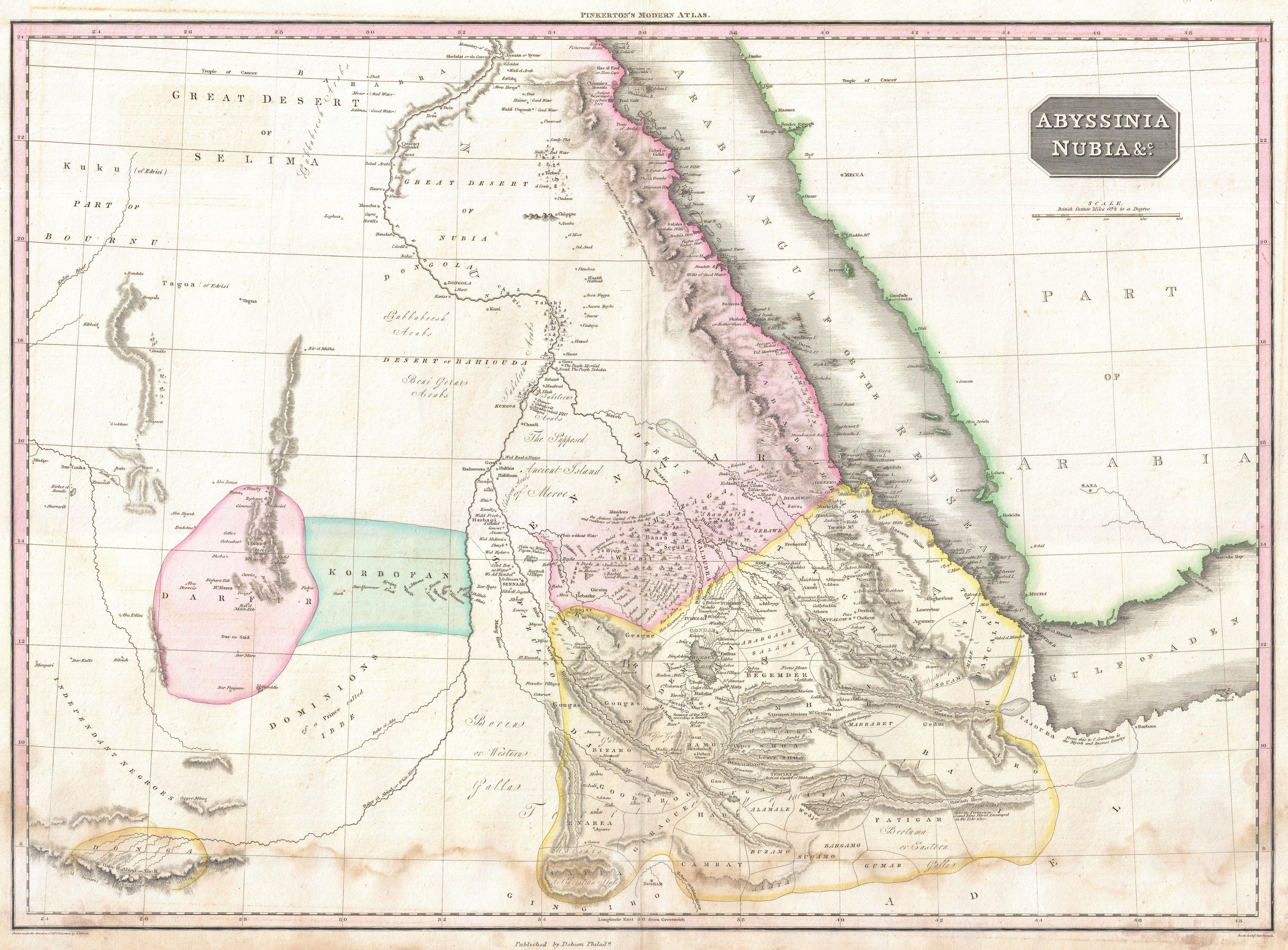
1818 map of "Abyssinia & Nubia", speaking of "independent negroes"

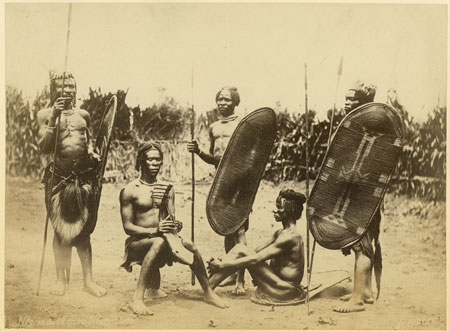
Zande with shields & harp, 1879

Little is known about historical developments at the location before the second half of the 19th century. Even its original name is not clear: according to the pioneering scholar of Sudan history Richard Leslie Hill, it was called "Bayyu", which is the same name as reportedly remembered by Zubeir Rahma.

In slight contrast, Gerasimos Makri writes that the old name was "Bāya" and Douglas H. Johnson mentions it as "Gbaya". Edward Thomas elaborates that "Gbaya" is another name for "Kresh", which is in turn the "name for several groups with origin stories in Western Bahr al-Ghazal and present-day CAR."

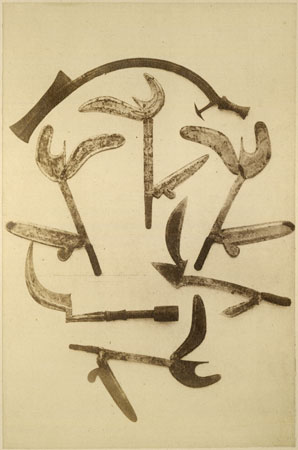
Zande throwing knives, 1879

Historiography has established that at least since the 18th century people in the Western part of the Bahr El Ghazal river system area were constantly on the move because of external pressures. Social groups were rather small and shifted frequently to avoid attacks from powerful neighbours who already possessed European weapons and forcefully expanded the trans-Saharan and Nilotic trading networks into the hinterlands for the exploitation of copper, ivory, ostrich feathers and slaves.

From the northern side, this pressure increased since the early 17th century with the rise of the Dar Fur Sultanate, as it established a patron-client relationship over the lowlands which became known as Dar Fertit. While Dar means 'home of', Fertit does not describe any ethnic group, but was at the time a pejorative "catch-all word for non-Fur, Arab, non-Dinka and non-Luo groups of Western Bahr El Ghazal". Darfur historian Rex Sean O'Fahey describes the dynamic frontiers as follows:

"it was not so much a place but rather a state of mind. As the slave raiders moved southwards, so Dar Fartit moved south."

From the south-western side, meanwhile, the people in Dar Fertit came under pressure from systematic raids by Zande chieftains and kings.

=== Turkiya (1821-1884/5) ===
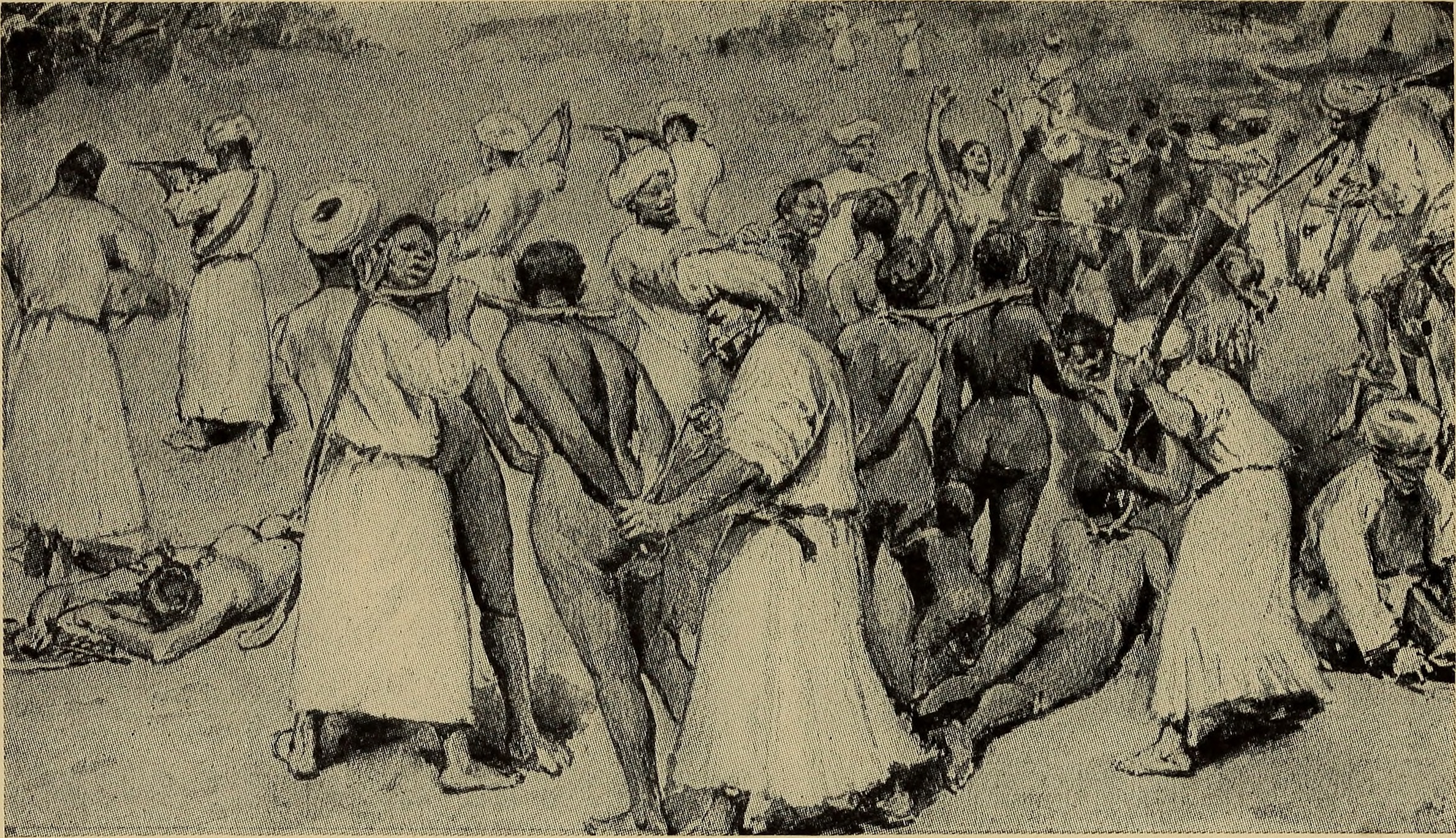
Illustration of slave raiding in Sudan from a missionary book

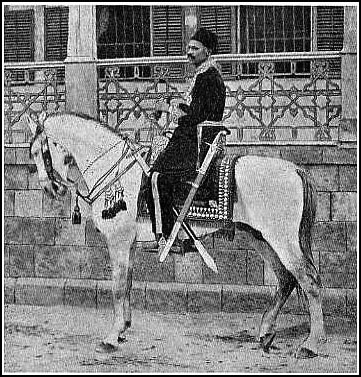
Al-Zubeir Rahma Mansur

The Sudanese historian Ahmed Sikainga describes the impact that the Egyptian-Ottoman conquest of the Funj Kingdom in 1821 had on the lands of Dar Fertit as follows:

"It represented the first large-scale efforts to draw the Nilotic regions into the expanding capitalist economy. Following the opening of the White Nile waters for navigation in the early 1840s, bands of European, Levantine, and northern Sudanese traders began to rush to the South. Eager to appropriate the resources of these virgin lands, these traders dominated the region by combining military power, political alliances, slave incorporation, and the judicious organization known as the zariba system. An Arabic word meaning 'thorned enclosure', the zariba in the Sudanese context referred to the small fortified settlements that were erstablished by the traders."

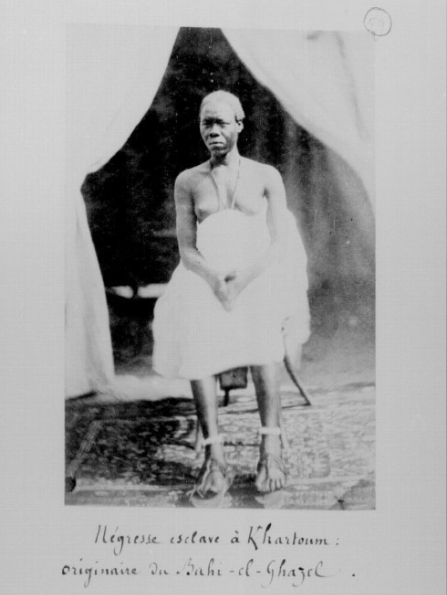
A female slave from Bahr El Ghazal photographed in 1882 in Khartoum

The Northern Sudanese merchant Al-Zubeir Rahma Mansur first came to Bahr El Ghazal in 1856 with a cousin on a mission for the major trader Ali Amuriyy, since the Egyptian government had been monopolising trade in Northern Sudan, which encouraged commercial expansion beyond the state control into the South. Zachary Berman argues that Zubeir was an imperialist "buccaneer" following the market as an archetypical agent, "however unconsciously, of broader global market forces expressing themselves in Bahr al-Ghazal", namely Great Britain and France through Egypt. At first he went for ivory, ostrich feathers and gum arabic, which were greatly demanded luxury goods in Europe. However, like other merchants, he found that profits were not sufficient for the required capital of his own company and hence ventured into slave trading.

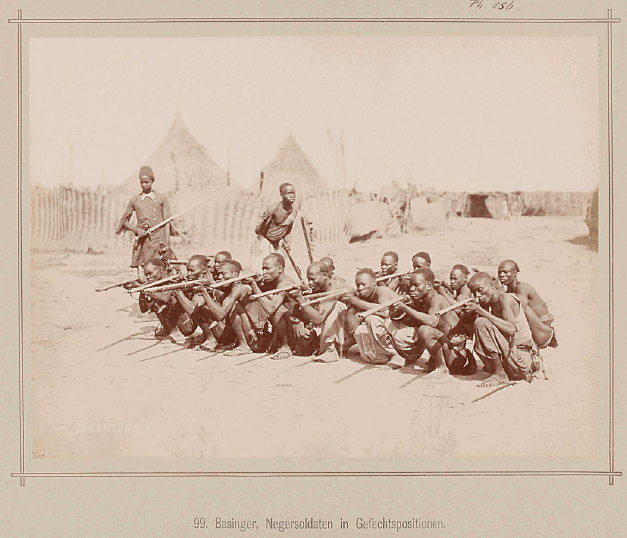
Bazinger slave soldiers

In 1865, Zubeir's army of slaves killed a local king called Adoo Shukoo and took control of his small territory, transforming the merchant into a monarch. Johnson stresses the strategic importance of the location "where the north-south caravan route from Dar Fartit to Zandeland joined the east-west route to the Nile via Wau, Meshra el-Rek, Rumbek, and Shambe". Lawrence Mire also argues that this critical location allowed him to have wider influence than other traders.

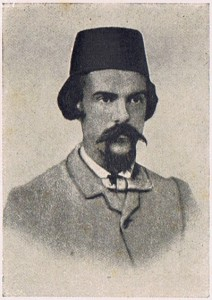
Georg Schweinfurth

While slave-raiding had been practised by Southern warlords before, the trade was taken under Zubeir to unprecedented large-scale levels. According to another pioneer of Sudan academia, Richard Gray, "by 1867 it was reliably estimated that 1800 slaves a year were being despatched northwards by Zubair". It is widely assumed that in what is now South Sudan altogether as many as 400,000 people were enslaved in just fourteen years. Many thousands are also assumed to have been killed as they resisted. Deim Zubeir became "the metropolis and the clearing house of the slave industry in that part of the world." Zubeir himself later claimed in a number of interviews that the establishment of his rule was a civilising mission in the name of Islam and that locals flocked to him for life service because of the stable conditions he provided in contrast to their previous poverty and insecurity. He also argued that European colonialism in the name of abolitionism was just another form of slavery.

In 1871, at the height of his power, when Zubeir controlled much of the Bahr el Ghazal region as well as what are today parts of Chad and the Central African Republic, he was visited at Deim Zubeir by the pioneering botanist and ethnologist Georg Schweinfurth, who was the first European to see the place. A blog series by the Smithsonian Libraries summarises the impressions of the Baltic German scholar and abolitionist, who went on to become a leading proponent for colonial ambitions of the German Empire, as follows:

"He found it to be a small town of many thousands of people, including Zubayr's army, government officials, and traders and their armies, all with their wives, concubines, children, personal slaves and their families, plus a group of religious authorities (ulema). To survive, this parasitic community raided surrounding villages, stealing cattle and food crops and taking slaves not only for service in the zariba but also to work the traders' own farms back in northern Sudan and, of course, to sell to foreign markets. Schweinfurth reported seeing four classes of slaves, all subjected to 'unbelievable degradation and cruelty': adult men, who served as soldiers; boys ages seven to ten, who carried their guns and ammunition; women, 'passed like dollars from hand to hand' as wives, concubines, and household servants; and both men and women to do field work and care for animals. He also reported that Zubayr's court was 'little less than princely.' "

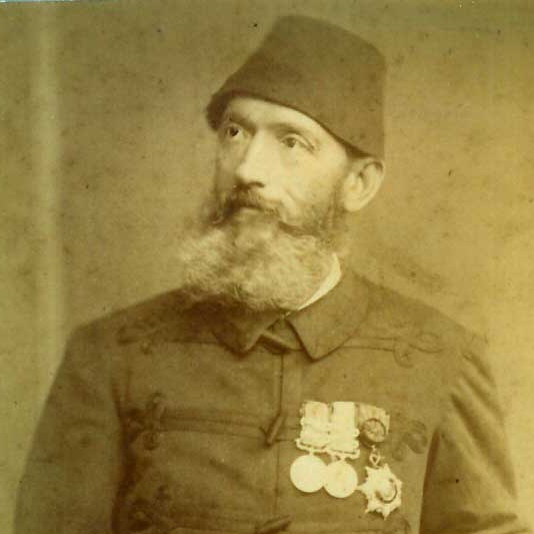
Romolo Gessi

In 1873, the Ottoman rulers of Sudan acknowledged Zubeir's power and granted him the title of governor over Bahr El Ghazal. One year later, he conquered the Darfur sultanate with his army of bazinger slave soldiers. As Zachary Berman concludes, Deim Zubeir was "simultaneously imperial and imperialized, an empire unto himself as well as part of overlapping overarching powers."

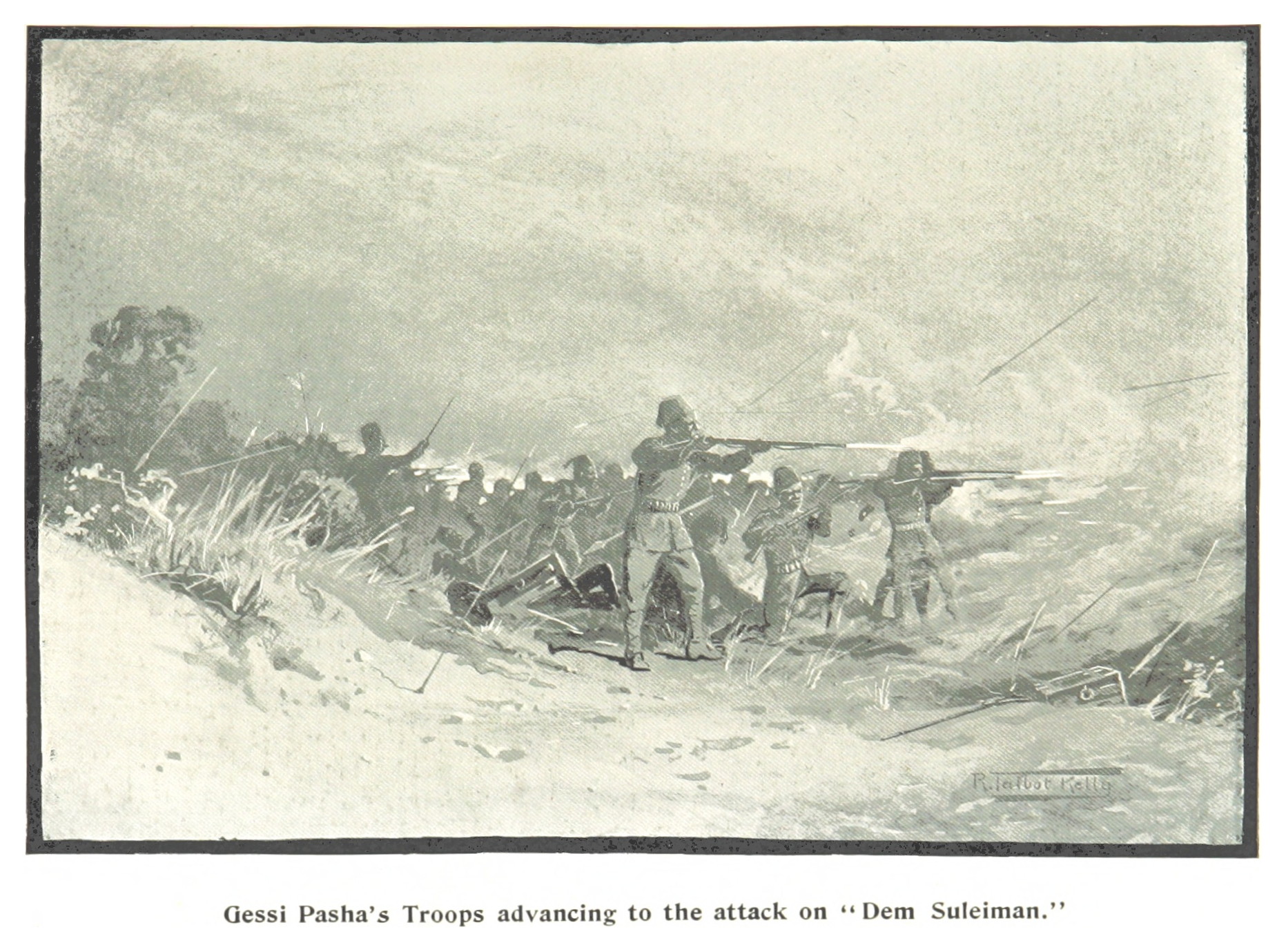
Illustration of Gessi's troops attacking Deim Suleiman

At this point, the Khedive ruler in Cairo moved against Zubeir's ambitions and had him detained indefinitely from 1876 on. Instead, Zubeir's son Suleiman took over and renamed Deim Zubeir into Deim Suleiman (also transliterated into various spellings like Dem Soliman, Daym Sulayman etc.). Suleiman took advantage of the discontent that had grown amongst Northern Sudanese traders because of high taxes and the anti-slavery efforts imposed by the government in Khartoum and started a rebellion in 1877.

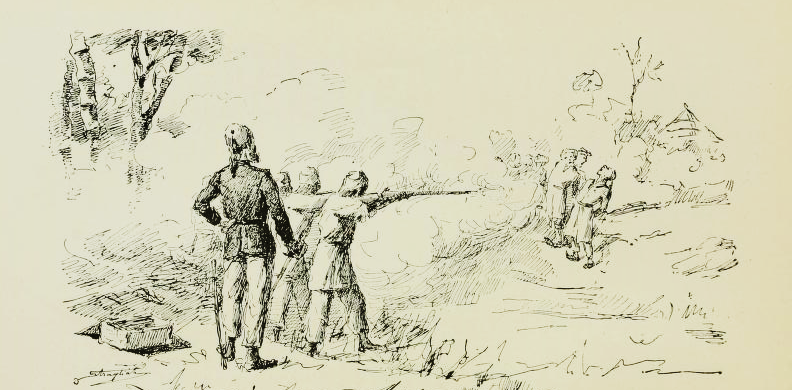
Illustration of Suleiman's execution

Suleiman's revolt was, however, short-lived. In 1878 and 1879 his forces were defeated by an Egyptian army under the Italian Romolo Gessi. The support of local Southern allies and their proxy forces led by the Zande king Tombura and Golo chief Kayongo played a key role in the war. Suleiman surrendered, but was executed regardless. Gessi moved into his former residence and set up headquarters there. One of his first steps was to disarm many of his own troops, who - by his own account - "were no less brutal and savage than Suleiman's troops."

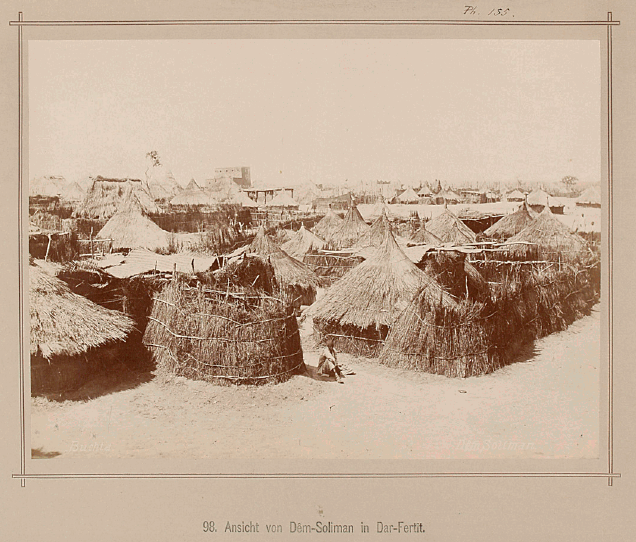
View of Deim Suleiman in 1879

In November 1879, the Austrian photographer, writer and scientist Richard Buchta visited Gessi, who retained the name Deim Suleiman. In a letter to Schweinfurth he wrote that Gessi, with the support of local Southern fighters whom he had armed as proxies, "did not just chase away the slave-traders, but actually annihilated them. Without any mercy, hundreds of Jellaba were chased into the bushes like wild beasts and butchered to death." The Russian-German explorer Wilhelm Junker, who visited Deim Suleiman shortly after Buchta, noted that:

"Soliman Bey Ziber had undoubtedly greatly strengthened the place, especially in recent times. Around the whole zeriba runs a double and treble palisade, 26 feet high; within this enclosure the several courts are separated by matting almost hard as boards, and behind them are grouped the high and spacious dwellings sur-mounted by conic roofs. Soliman's residence, now occupied by Gessi, was built in the style of a two-storeyed house in Khartum; there were also several other strong brick structures, besides magazines well suited for their purpose."

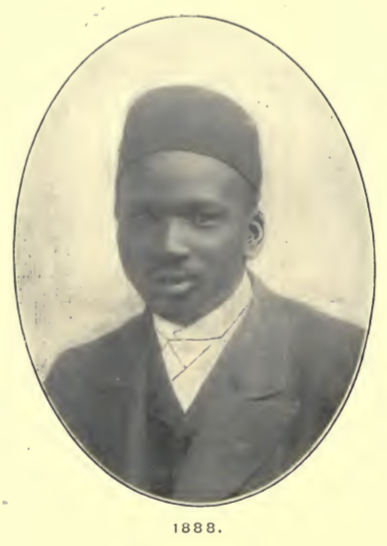
Salim Charles Wilson in 1888

With regard to demographics, Junker observed: "so great a mixture of tribes has resulted from the Arab rule, that it is no longer possible to lay down accurate frontiers between the several populations."

The most prominent slave, who was freed during Gessi's war against Suleiman, became Hatashil Masha Kathish. While this is how he himself wrote his birth-name, other sources spell it as Hatashil Macar Aciethiec or Atobhil Macar Kathiec. He was born around 1859 as the son of a Gok Dinka chief in today's Cuiebet and captured in 1876 by slavers, who renamed him "Salim". In 1880, he met the Church Missionary Society missionaries Charles T. Wilson and Robert Felkin in Deim Suleiman, became the servant of Wilson and joined him on his way back to England. There he was baptised in 1882 under the name Salim Charles Wilson and later started doing missionary work in Yorkshire and Lincolnshire, becoming known as "The Black Evangelist of the North".

Deim Suleiman remained the official capital of Bahr El Ghazal and housed many shops with craftsmen famous for their skills, though Wau became the greater commercial centre. According to Father Stefano Santandrea of the Verona Fathers, the first buildings of burnt-bricks in the province were erected under the rule of Gessi as well as the first school, "to which 17 chiefs were already sending their children. They were receiving instruction (in Arabic) together with over 100 children of the local troops". Gessi declared his expectation to draw government clerks from the indigenous graduates after a few years.

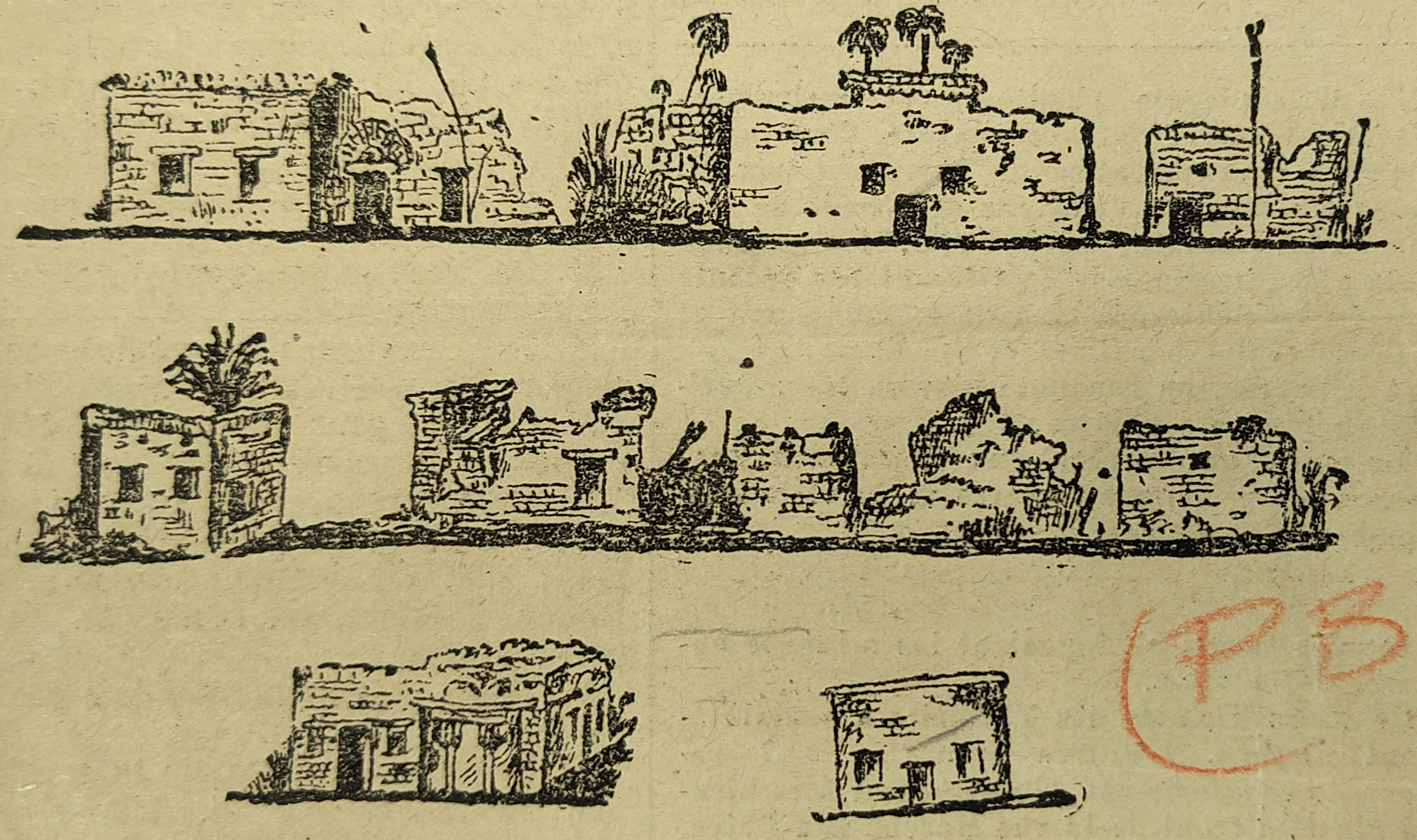
Drawing of Deim Zubeir by Florent Colmant.

Santandrea also reports that "a splendid new mosque was being built, and Gessi won many hearts by this act". It was the first mosque ever in all of Bahr El Ghazal.

Gessi's successor as Ottoman governor (Bey), the Englishman Frank Miller Lupton, revived the official name Deim Zubeir instead of Deim Suleiman after his arrival there in December 1881. However, according to a British ornithologist, locals called the town "Juku".

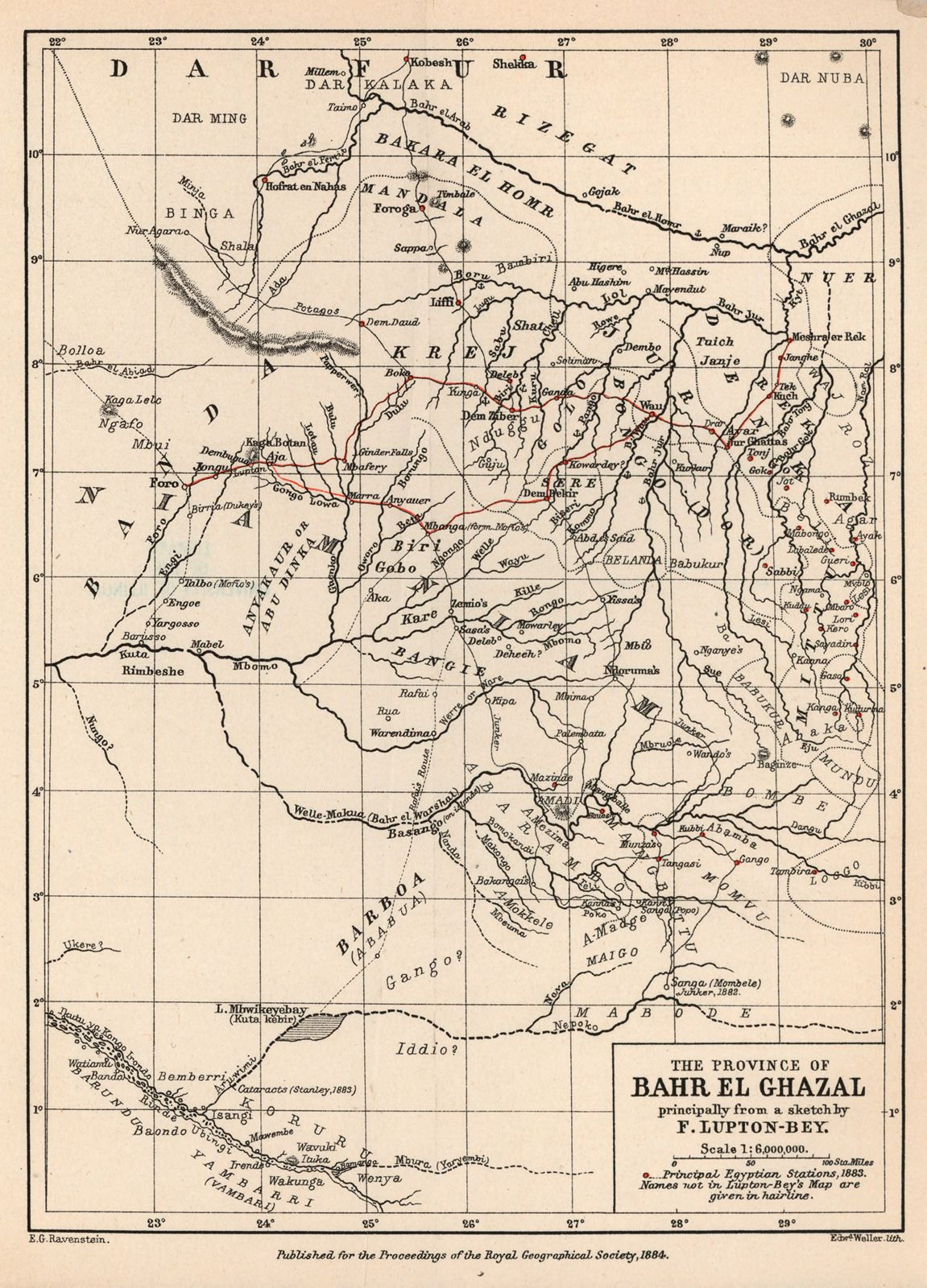
Map based on a sketch by Lupton

=== Mahdiya (1884/5-1898) ===
In early 1884, a joint campaign by Mahdist rebels led by Emir Karam Allah Kurkusawi, a former merchant, and local Southern forces defeated the Turkish-Egyptian rule in Bahr El Ghazal, almost one year before the fall of Khartoum. According to the Austrian Rudolf Carl von Slatin Pasha, one of Kurkusawi's brothers had served as a commander under Lupton Bey and therefore managed to convince most of the Ottoman officers and troops to defect. In April 1884, having fought for eighteen months against the Islamist insurgents, Lupton was compelled to surrender to Kurkusawi in Deim Zubeir.

After this victory Kurkusawi soon engaged in fighting against local Southern groups. However, he was recalled, following the death of the Mahdist leader Muhammad Ahmad in June 1885, and Bahr El Ghazal was abandoned by Ahmad's successors. Thus, the settlement was largely left to itself for almost one decade and "reduced to an ill-presided collection of tumbledown buildings of raw bricks", but was then all the more re-elevated to the global stage of imperialist competition around the "Scramble for Africa":

==== Belgian Colonial Expeditions (1892-1894) ====
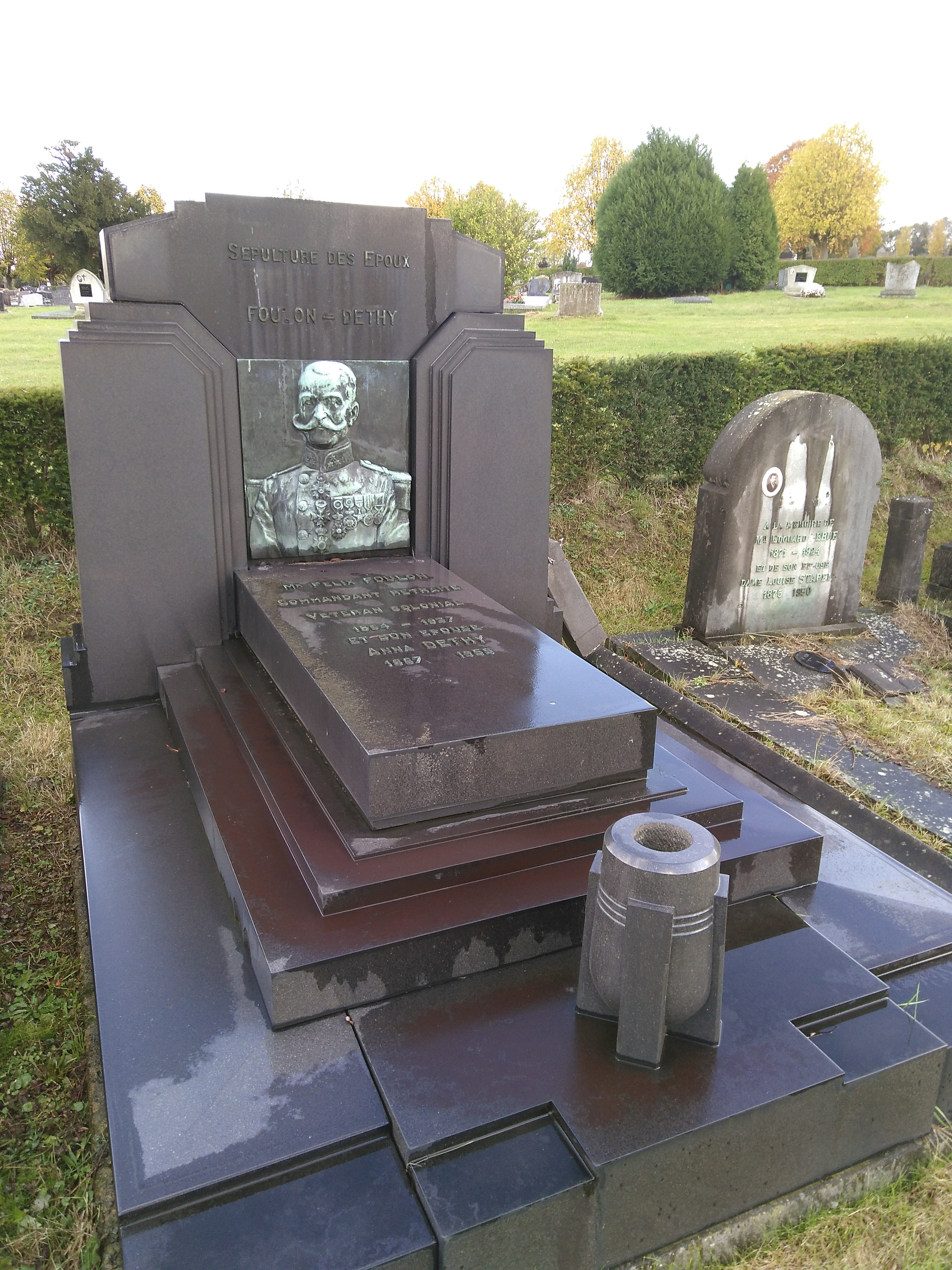
The grave of Felix Foulon at the cemetery of Saint-Gilles, Brussels

According to Belgian records, it was a request in 1892 from Faki Ahmed, the Sultan of Wadai, for assistance against the Mahdist forces, which provided the occasion for the colonial strategists in Brussels to intervene for their "intention" to expand the Congo Free State up to Deim Zubeir, with the support of proxy troops from their Zande allies, who had started pushing into Western Bahr El Ghazal already two years earlier. In 1892, an expedition under Felix Foulon marched towards Deim Zubeir and signed treaties with a number of local chiefs. According to some sources, he did reach Deim Zubeir, but other accounts claim that he did not.

A second mission under Xavier-Ernest Donckier de Donceel marched towards Deim Zubeir in April 1894, but retreated from there under pressure from Mahdist forces. A few months later, in August 1894, Belgium's King Leopold II ceded all territorial claims over Bahr El Ghazal to France. During the withdrawal, the Belgian officer Florent Colmant "wanted to satisfy a long-cherished wish of seeing with his own eyes Deim Zubeir", reached the place with some 80 troops on 24 December and left the next day:

"he only saw half-ruined houses of sunbaked bricks."

==== French Colonial Expeditions (1897-1900) ====
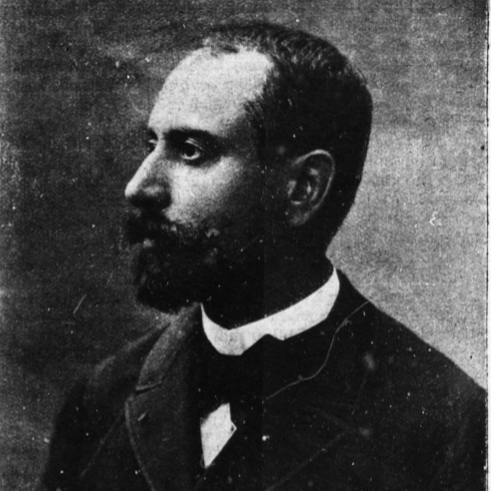
Liotard, ca. 1898

Two years later, French military missions of Senegalese troops under Victor Liotard penetrated into Bahr-al-Ghazal from what is now the CAR, and took possession of Deim Zubeir in April 1897. Santandrea noted with reference to the account of one member of the French mission that they found "an abandoned place, where one does not even see ruins, except traces of a trench (ditch) about 100 metres by side".

The colonial officer Adolphe Louis Cureau founded a new post and renamed Deim Zubeir into Fort Dupleix. His successor Liotard had a new fortified building erected. This was done with regard to the strategic importance of the location as a potential key hub for the expeditionary force of General Jean-Baptiste Marchand in its quest to expand France's control of territory up to the Nile.

Following the Fashoda incident and the Franco-Egyptian treaty of 1899 which ceded Bahr El Ghazal to the Anglo-Egyptian Sudan, the French forces left the post in 1900.

=== Anglo-Egyptian Condominium (1899-1955) ===
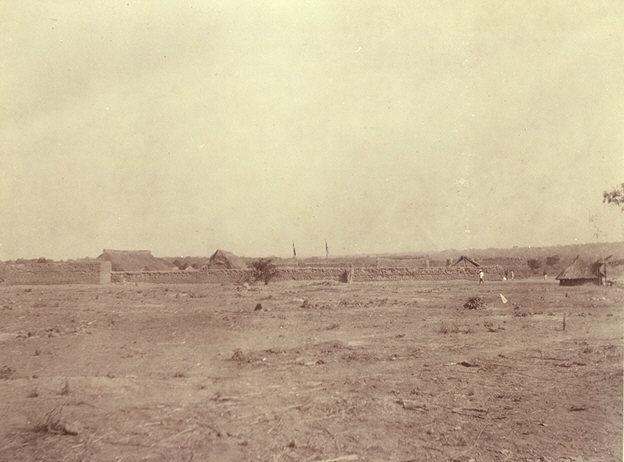
View of Deim Zubeir, 1902 (Slatin collection, Sudan Archive Durham SAD.A32/78)

In 1900, an Anglo-Egyptian "reoccupation" force of Egyptian and Sudanese soldiers entered Bahr El Ghazal. Most of them had reportedly been recruited from the defeated Mahdist army and "were chiefly ex-slave natives of the Province", which caused some unease amongst the population.

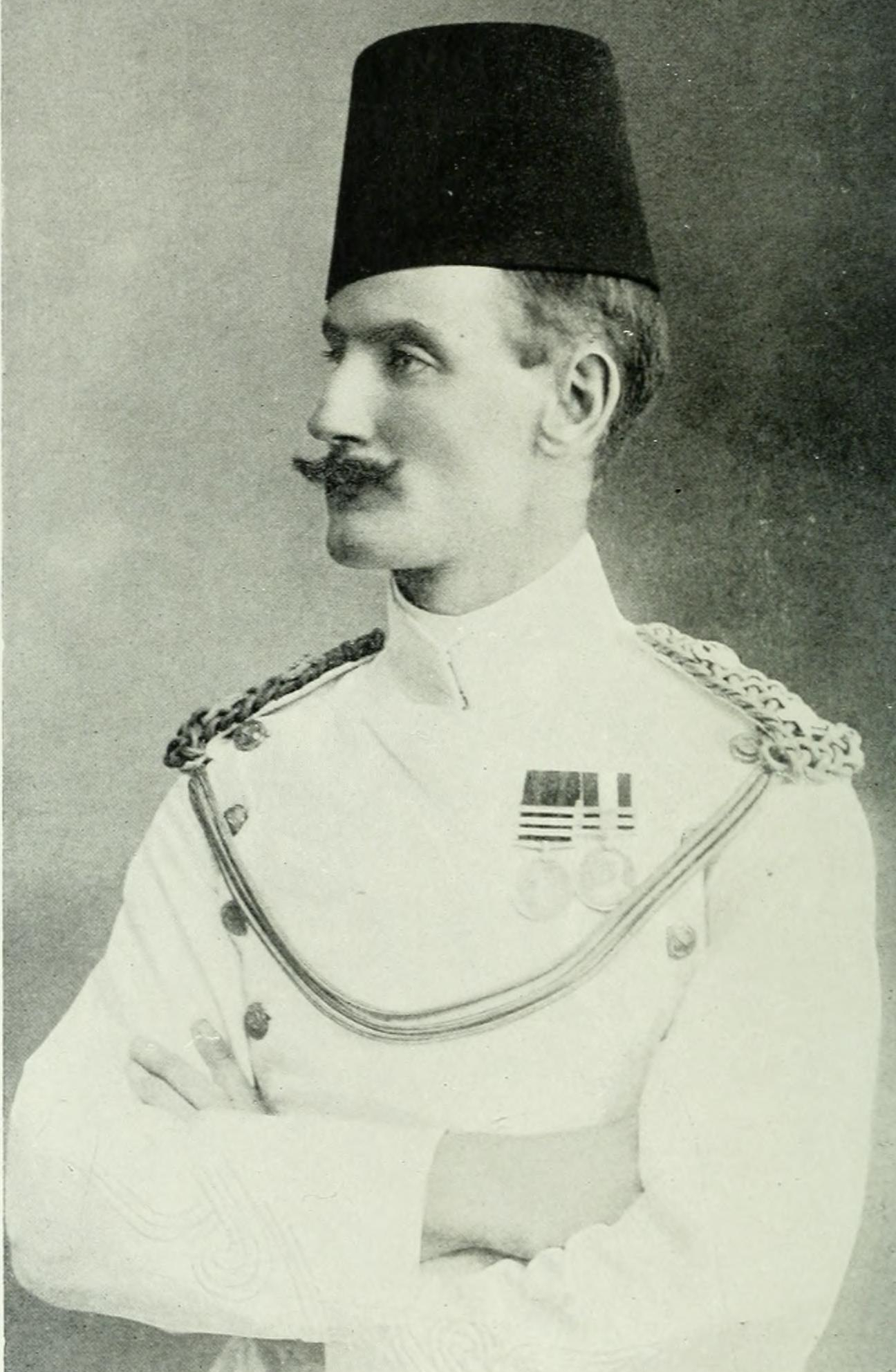
David Comyn

The first British officer to conduct a patrol to Deim Zubeir was Major William Boulnois in early 1901. His mission found that

"the shrunken remnant of the population, constantly raided not only by the Azande but by other groups, had in despair given up all attempt either to keep livestock or to cultivate. Forced down to the level of primitive 'hunters and collectors', they now existed 'chiefly on the natural resources of the forest - roots, seeds, wild honey, fruit and wild beasts'."

One year later, Captain Arthur Murray Pirie officially "occupied" the place for the annexation of Bahr El Ghazal, but was soon recalled for a punitive expedition.

The first inspector to head the post was an Egyptian officer, who was soon succeeded by the Scottish Lieutenant David Comyn. According to Santandrea, Comyn "found only one building worth mentioning, namely the newly erected fort of the French". However, Comyn writes in his memoirs that he also saw "the charred remains of the stockade" of Sulaiman's fortifications. Even a decade later, one of Comyn's successors wrote that "the burnt stumps of his stockade, and the mud walls of his houses" were still visible.

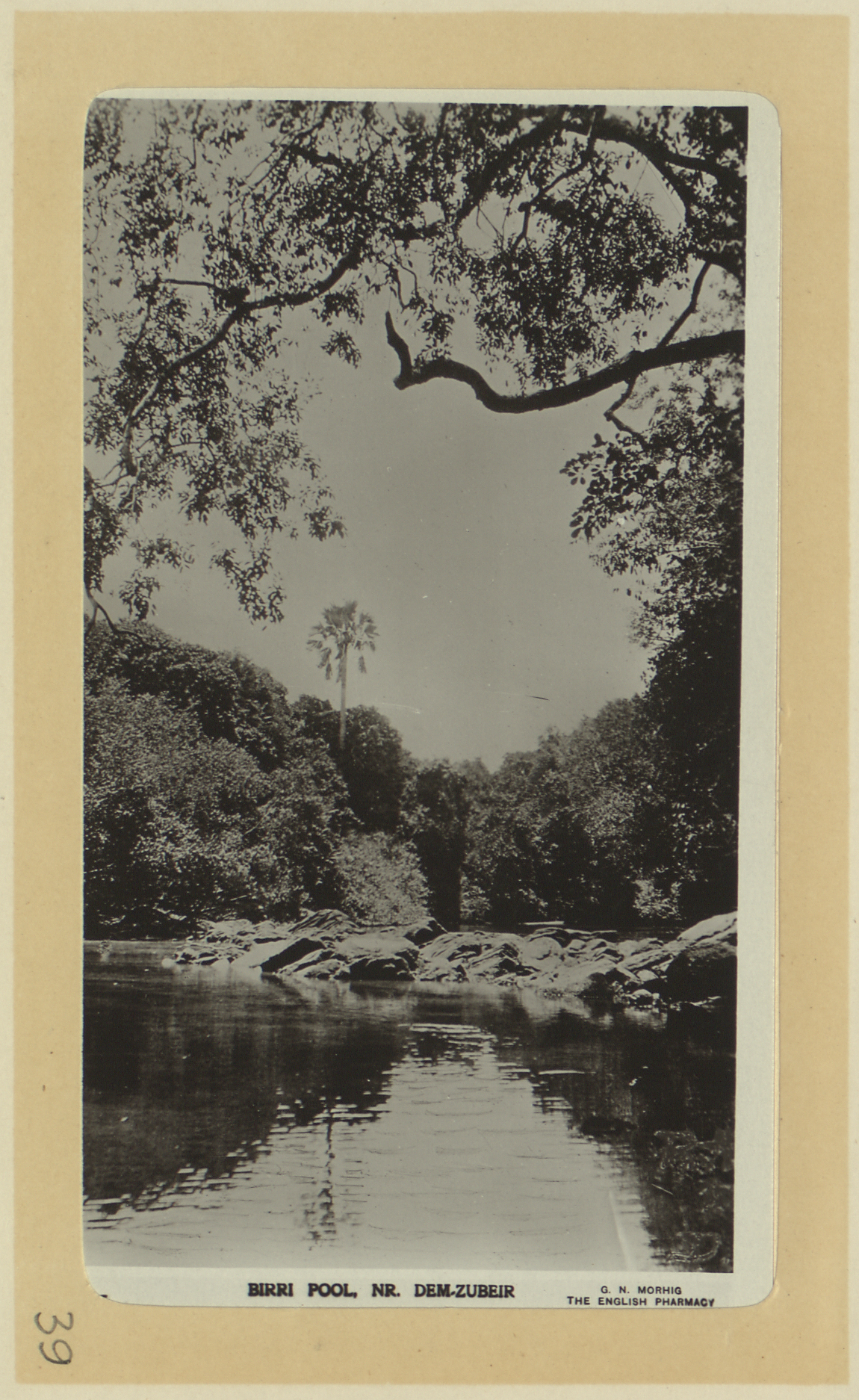
Postcard from circa 1906, caption: 'Birri Pool, Near Dem-Zubeir"

Soon after his arrival Comyn ordered the construction of a new fort "to take the place of the one of green brick built by the French", since the competition with the Congo Free State for control of Southern Sudan was not over yet. From 1902 on, negotiations were conducted between London and Brussels, accompanied "by provocative incidents":

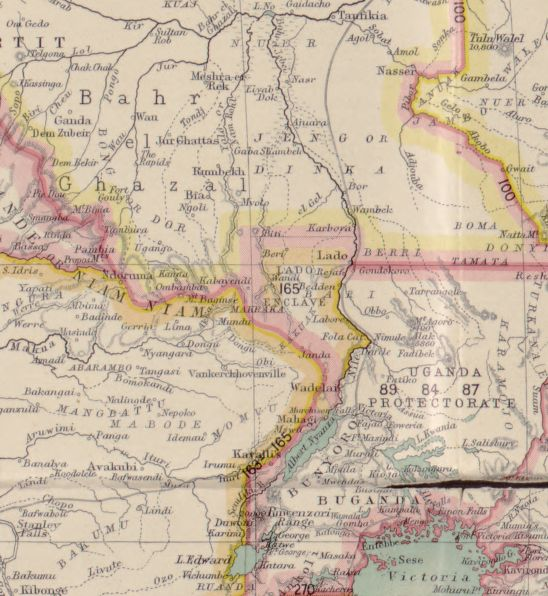
1909 map of the Lado Enclave

In this context, Belgium's King Leopold II ordered a "scientific" mission to Bahr El Ghazal under Charles Lemaire and Louis Royaux in 1902. Its vanguard led by Captain André Landeghem reached Deim Zubeir in February 1903, but the Condominium government of Sudan prevented the expedition from moving on to the copper-rich area of Hofrat en Nahas and Landeghem aborted the mission. Leopold gave up his claims to the Southern Sudan only in 1906, in return for keeping a part of it as the Lado Enclave for the duration of his reign.

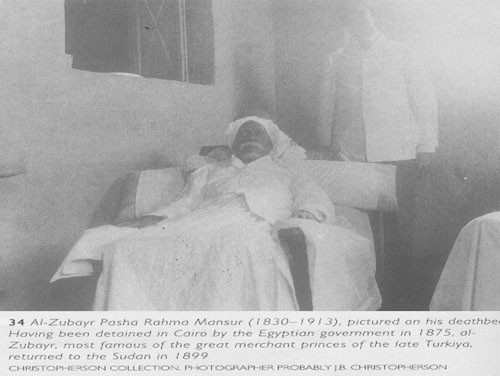
Zubeir Rahma on his deathbed in 1913 in his native Northern Sudanese village of Geili, almost half a century after he set up his slaving regime in Bahr El Ghazal and named its capital after himself

In 1903, Deim Zubeir became the capital of the Western District of Bahr al-Ghazal. In 1905, Comyn was assisted by a Syrian medical doctor, an Egyptian police officer and a scribe. The number of "irregular troops" at the time was around 120, recruited mainly from the local population. Comyn himself claimed that under his command Deim Zubeir became a "pioneer of red-brick buildings in Southern Sudan". According to South Sudan historians M.W. Daly and Øystein H. Rolandsen, "immediate profits were realized from confiscation and sale of the zaribas' stored ivory."

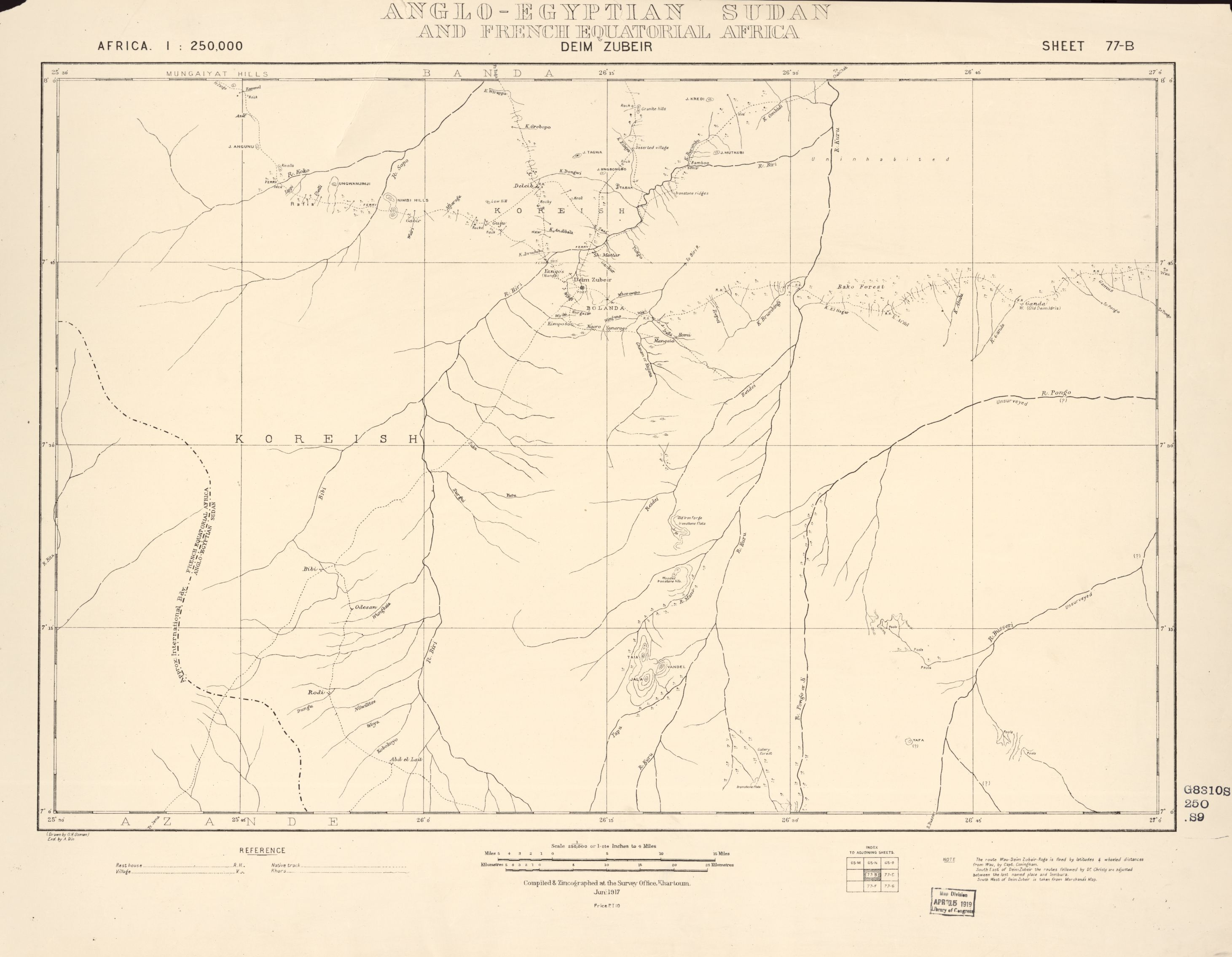
1917 map of Deim Zubeir area

A doctoral thesis by a South Sudanese historian found that the introduction of tax collecting under Comyn in 1904 was particularly unpopular, since harsher conditions were applied than in neighbouring districts. Locals who could not pay taxes were forced to do road construction work instead. Daly concludes that "the most noticeable effect of 'administration' of this type was the recalcitrance of those administered." In his memoirs, Comyn defended himself against his contemporary critics as follows: "The hardship and discontent which arose was, I am sure, due to the fact that, in the neighbouring district of Wau, everything that was refused at Dem Zubier — i.e. rifles, ammunition, spirits, money, &c. — was freely scattered."

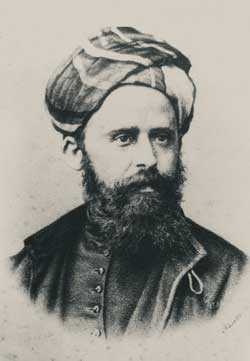
Daniele Comboni

According to some sources, the administrative headquarters of the Western District of Bahr al-Ghazal were moved from Deim Zubeir to Raja in 1906, according to others in 1907 or early 1908, against the opposition of local leaders in Raja. Deim Zubeir residents at the time included a substantial number of ex-soldiers and former slaves, who had lost their ethnic ties and converted to Islam with Arabic as lingua franca. Refugees from French Equatorial Africa (FEA) settled in Deim Zubeir during this time as well, but were displaced by the British-led colonial administration back to FEA in 1912. Living conditions at the time were particularly hard, since the area of Deim Zubeir was heavily infested with tsetse flies, which transmits the sleeping sickness.

At the same time, slave trade did continue in Bahr El Ghazal, since it was - according to British records - "the only trade which has any money in it in these parts, except perhaps ivory" and for some years no anti-slavery posts were set up because of "financial reasons." However, it is not definitely clear whether Deim Zubeir and surrounding areas were still part of it. In any case, there was some presence of Greek merchants in Deim Zubeir, as trade was dominated by the Greeks in Sudan.

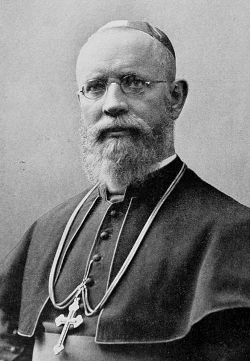
Franz Xaver Geyer

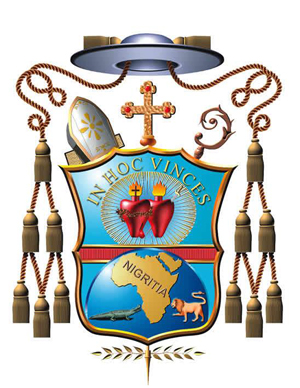
The emblem of the Combonians

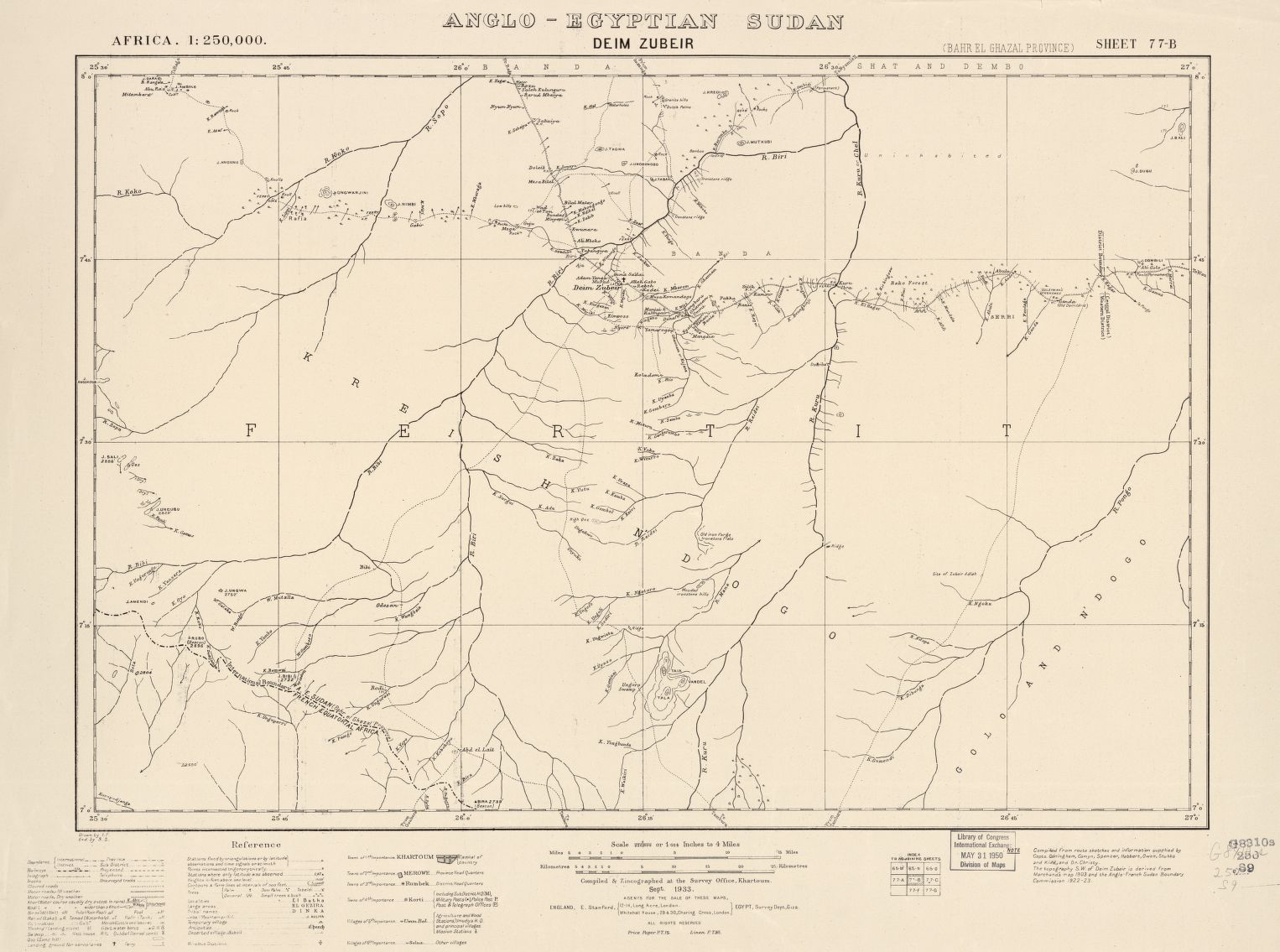
1933 map of Deim Zubeir area

In 1923, the Comboni Missionaries of the Heart of Jesus - also known as the Verona Fathers - moved to realise "a long-dreamed plan of expansion in the west" by preparing the grounds for the founding of a mission station in Deim Zubeir. Already in 1905, their German Bishop Franz Xaver Geyer had visited the town on his tour to make an assessment of missionary potentials. 18 years later, Provincial Superior Father Angelo Arpe sent a Southern Sudanese catechist, Baptist Mufighi, to Deim Zubeir:

"This was a major step for the Verona Fathers. In early times, the mission had been very hesitant about doing evangelistic work among Muslims. Mufighi began a school in Deim Zubeir but faced much opposition from the strong Muslim community there. When Baptist gathered children for his school, Tabaan, the man in charge of the Muslim school, ordered Baptist's school to be closed, and all the children sent home. Mufighi refused. He declared that he must be arrested first, and so presented himself to Major [Mervyn] Wheatley, the District Commissioner. Wheatley ruled that the new school should be allowed."

The government approval to found a missionary station on the Southern fringe of the widely islamised North-Western Bahr El Ghazal has been considered by Lilian Passmore Sanderson as reflecting "the hardening of official policy against Islam in the South." And she stresses that

"Ten years earlier, permission would almost certainly have been refused on the ground that Deim Zubeir was too sensitive an area for a mission station."

For the first years, Mufighi was visited several times a year by Arpe and Father Giuseppe Pagliani at the nascent station. The mission was then officially founded in March 1926 by the fathers Luigi Bernhardt and Giacomo Gubert, who settled in a government compound. In December of that year they were joined by Pagliani, who stayed for altogether more than a decade and "- according to many - left a piece of his heart there." The post was dedicated to "Our Lady of Mercy", the sanctuary of Savona. In this context, Bernhardt noted that - unlike in other missions - there was a great influx of women. Hence, the station was extended by a mission of the Comboni Sisters in 1936. One of the sisters recalled it as "a beautiful mission, in lovely scenery, nature seems to make everything flourish: we had good, abundant harvests, plants fruits, flowers, colours etc." In 1953, there were four Comboni sisters from Italy in Deim Zubeir.

The preeminent scholar of anthropology and linguistics in the area became Comboni Father Stefano Santandrea, who served in the Deim Zubeir mission from 1948 to 1955 after twenty years in Wau. While travelling outside the station by bicycle, especially to tend to people with lepers, he researched and published numerous articles in academic journals as well as a multitude of monographic books, most prominently his attempt of "A Tribal History of the Western Bahr El Ghazal". In the early 1950s, Santandrea counted a population of some 500 in the settlement and its neighbourhood with a variety of ethnic affiliations that merged through common inter-marriage. As Sikainga puts it: "In this frontier zone, ethnic label fluctuated in response to changing social and political circumstances." Likewise, O'Fahey stresses with special regard to the Dar Fertit area that "the simplistic perception of the Sudan as a static mosaic of tribes each immutably living within its own little world is a travesty of the dynamic reality."

The British governor of Bahr El Ghazal, Thomas Richard Hornby Owen, observed during a visit to Deim Zubeir in the early 1950s "increased drunkenness, particularly among government officials and employees".

One of the pioneers of modern civilian politics in Southern Sudan, Faustino Roro, was born in Deim Zubeir in 1923. During the early 1940s he co-founded the Southern Sudan Social and Political Association, based in Juba. During his studies of political science in the early 1950s at the American University in Cairo he wrote a number of articles on Southern Sudan for the Egyptian Gazette and is therefore also regarded as a pioneer of South(ern) Sudanese journalism. According to South Sudanese historian Kuyok Abol Kuyok, he played a decisive role as a member of Buth Diu's Liberal Party in drafting principles for demanding Federalism, which has been a key issue ever since.

In contrast, also one of the modern pioneers of non-civilian politics in South(ern) Sudan originated from Deim Zubeir: Camillo Kamin Sharf al-Din, a 23-year-old soldier from Deim Zubeir who was one of the mutineers in the Eastern Equatorian town of Torit in August 1955. After the bloody revolt, he fled to Kenya and then Uganda.

=== Sudan Independence (1956-2011) ===
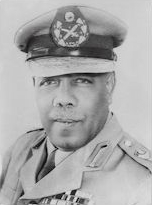
Ibrahim Abboud

When Sudan gained its independence on 1 January 1956 from the Anglo-Egyptian Condominium, the ruling Northern parties in Khartoum harboured deep suspicions against the Christian missionaries in Southern Sudan as foreign agents. Such nationalist and legalistic arguments - rather than religious ones - were used by the government of Abdallah Khalil for its 1957 decision to nationalise all missionary schools, including the Comboni school in Deim Zubeir. Father Santandrea later denied accusations of having excluded Muslim pupils from its elementary school. One of the regular attendees, he emphasized, was a grandson of Dar al-Kuti's Sultan Muhammad al-Sanusi of Ndele, "the last of the great slave merchants in Central Africa."

Those policies became much more repressive during the military regime of General Ibrahim Abboud, which came to power in late 1958 and pursued a strategy of Arabisation and Islamisation in the South. The army rulers expelled most missionaries in 1962 and 1963 from the Southern Sudanese region and so the Comboni mission in Deim Zubeir was hit as well: apparently only one priest and one sister remained there, Father Angelo Matordes, the superior of the mission, as well as Sister Prassede Zamperini.

==== Anyanya-Insurrection (1963-1972) ====
At the same time - in 1963 - the Anyanya rebel movement was founded, though consisting for its first years of rather loosely connected groups. Camillo Kamin Sharf al-Din - the veteran of the 1955 Torit mutiny, who hailed from Deim Zubeir - joined the insurgents right at the beginning. Other individuals from Fertit communities in the greater Deim Zubeir area joined as well and engaged in attacking army convoys.

Also, a leading member in exile of Father Saturnino Lohure's secessionist Sudan African Closed District National Union (SACDNU) - Alexis Mbale - originated from a village close to Deim Zubeir and had been educated at the Comboni mission school there. These affiliations may have been amongst the reasons why government forces in Deim Zubeir suspected collaboration between residents and the insurgents:

In 1964, The New York Times reported that the government in Khartoum had received an "official report" about a Deim Zubeir resident who had been arrested and executed without trial or investigation over allegations of giving food to rebels. The Scottish journalist Cecil Eprile wrote in a book that the dead body of Albino Bambala, a schoolteacher in Deim Zubeir, showed marks of brutal torture, according to relatives who buried him in February 1964. Bambala's name is included in the online project "South Sudan: Remembering the Ones We Lost".

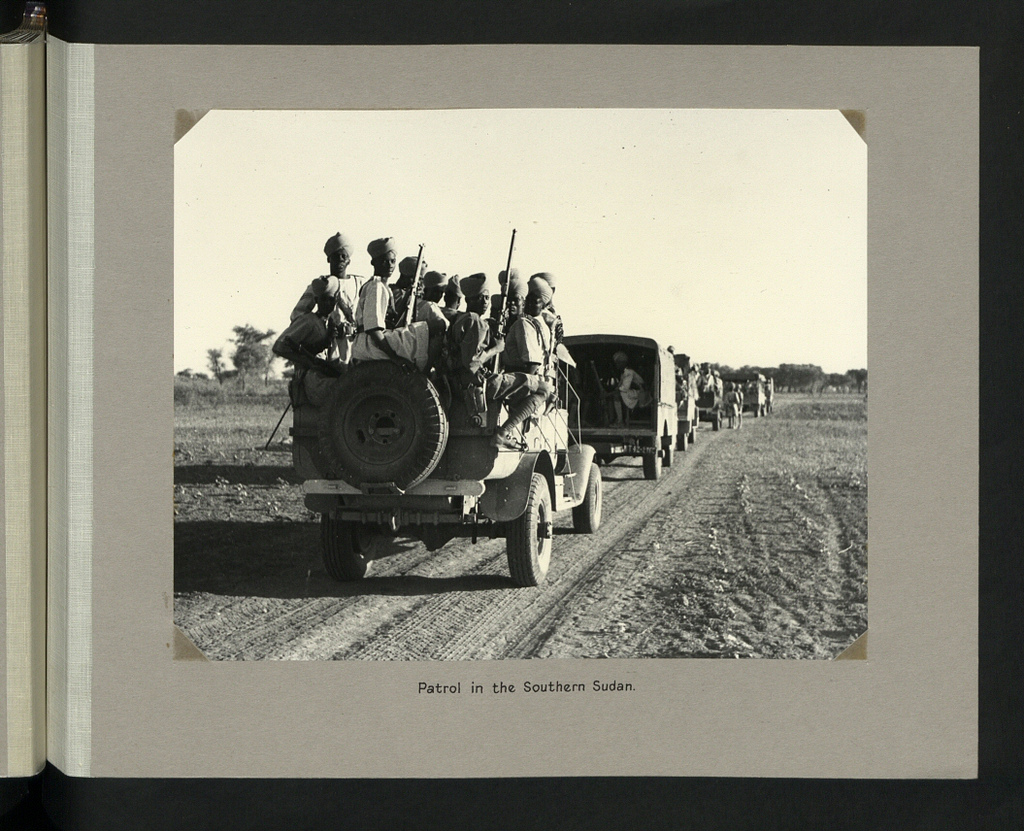
Army patrol in Southern Sudan

In a similar incident, church circles reported that at the same time the catechist Baptist Mufighi, who had laid the foundations for the establishment of the Comboni mission, was tortured and killed by "Security" Police for suspected support of the Anyanya rebels. According to these reports, public commemorations were banned and his family prevented from burying the body. The mission was closed a few days later in the wake of the general expulsions of the last missionaries.

In October 1964, the president of the Sudan African National Union, Joseph Oduhu, reported that the Catholic church in Deim Zubeir had been looted by soldiers of the Sudanese Armed Forces. He also accused an Army Captain of raping a schoolmistress. Another Catholic clergyman, Father Barnaba Deng, who had served in Deim Zubeir during the early 1960s and was supportive of the rebellion, got killed in August 1965.

The Sudanese Ministry of the Interior later published a "Blue Book" on the expulsion of the missionaries, which contained correspondence of the Belanda guerilla leader Alfons Dinia with the mission in Deim Zubeir. Dinia operated some 50 miles south-east of the town and was allegedly visited by a member of the station. Sanderson concedes that the letters appear authentic, but she concludes:

"The documents do not of course afford any evidence whatever for assistance to the guerillas by the VFM as an organisation. Indeed, all the evidence suggests that the Mission was very anxious to avoid comprising itself in this way, and that it was Mission policy 'to decline every request coming from doubtful sources'. But it would not be easy, either practically, humanly or even theologically, for missionaries and priests abrupty to break off all relations with members of their flock who koined the resistance. And if a missionary received a plea for help from a parishioner-turned-guerilla (as many undoubtedly did), was he morally bound to do his strict legal duty by reporting the circumstances to the nearest police post?"

According to the Catholic Diocese of Wau, most residents of Deim Zubeir fled in 1965 year to Tambura, near the border with the CAR, and the mission was abandoned. While there were also reports that Anyanya insurgents committed atrocities against recalcitrant civilians as well, it is not known whether such indiscriminate action took place in the Deim Zubeir area, too.

The South Sudanese historian Scopas Poggo found through interviews with former Anyanya officers that unity among the rebel forces in Bahr al-Ghazal was only achieved in June 1967 under the command of Philip Nanga Mariik.

==== Addis Ababa Agreement (1972-1983) ====
Flag of the Bahr El Ghazal region

After the 1972 Addis Ababa Agreement between the regime of Jafaar Nimeri in Khartoum and the Anyanya rebels, refugees in the neighbouring CAR and Internally Displaced Persons (IDPs) soon moved back. However, new tensions also soon arose, since Fertit leaders argued that Dinka elites received disproportionate numbers of government jobs.

The Comboni missionaries returned to Deim Zubeir as well, though it is unclear when exactly. In 1978, Father Peter Nenebubu was a Parish Priest for Deim Zubeir.

At the same time, demands grew louder to rename the town. Most prominently, in 1979 the pioneering Southern Sudanese journalist Atem Yaak protested in an article:

"the real problem with the map [...] is why certain names should continue to appear in modern maps of the Sudan. I am referring in particular to Deim Zubair and Said Bundas. The names which make the paper, on which they are written stink, should be erased from the map of the Sudan."

==== SPLA-Insurrection (1983-2005) ====
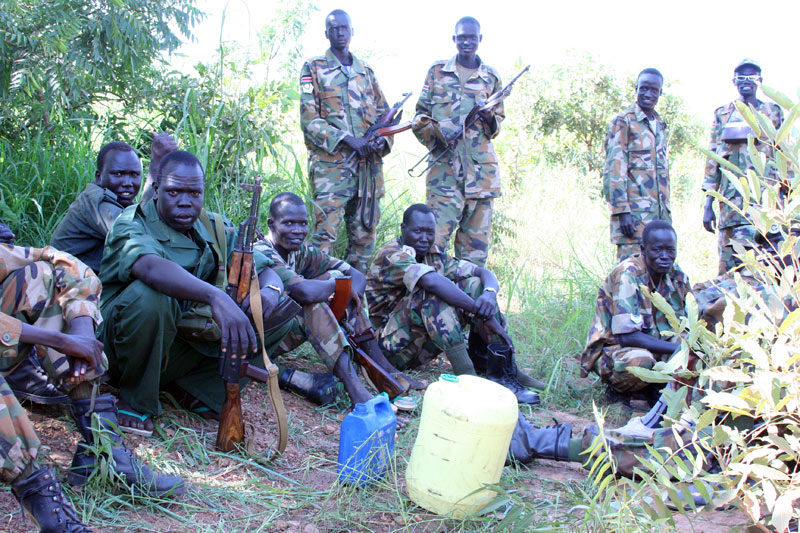
SPLA fighters

Soon after the 1983 mutiny of Bor, the area of Deim Zubeir was once again affected by war. According to tribal leaders, civilians in Deim Zubeir and surrounding villages suffered from attacks by the insurgent Sudan People' Liberation Army (SPLA) in 1985 and 1986. Johnson reasons that those raids "on Fertit areas were part of a strategy in the mid-1980s to attack civilian populations seen as hostile, which was partially due to the inability of the guerrillas to hold territory". Moreover, SPLA assaults on the neighbouring town of Raja around Christmas-time in 1987 and on settlements along the road between Wau and Deim Zubeir caused mass displacement of civilians.

In reaction, this led to the formation of counterinsurgent tribal militias in Deim Zubeir. The Dutch scholar Daniel Blocq, who was a UN military observer in Wau after 2005, argues "that the emergence of the Fertit militia was principally a grassroots phenomenon stemming from local tensions and conflicts", before such groups were co-opted and armed by the military intelligence of successive regimes in Khartoum for counterinsurgency. According to Samson Wassara, a leading South Sudanese scholar of political science, it was a militia with the euphemistic name National Peace Forces that operated in the area throughout the war. Like the SPLA, this group - also known as Salam Forces or Jaesh As-Salam - was accused by human rights activists like Amnesty International of killing hundreds of civilians.

Despite the war and the large distance, Comboni Father Salvatore Pacifico as the Parish Priest of Raga still used to come to Deim Zubeir in the mid-1980s, according to Father Lwanga Cornelio, who was born and raised there.

In November 1990, the BBC reported that Fertit militia forces defected from the government to the SPLA and "overran" Deim Zubeir town. Blocq stresses that the tribal and sub-tribal lines were blurred and Fertit combatants could be found on both sides.

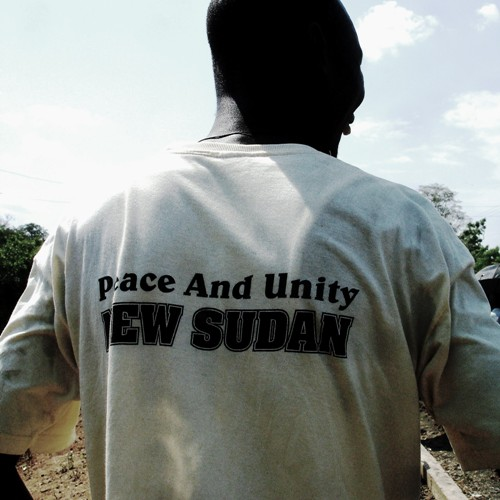
"NEW SUDAN"

In June 2001 the SPLA overwhelmed Deim Zubeir, which as a garrison town was a considerable loss for the government in Khartoum. The rebels claimed to have killed 400 government soldiers. The BBC Monitoring Service at the time noted reports that the SPLA also "bombed a military camp for the displaced in Deim Zubeir". The offensive prompted a mass exodus of the civilian population, including families of soldiers, from Deim Zubeir and surrounding areas heading north and north-west into government-controlled areas. About 30,000 IDPs fled towards Timsahah and about 8,000 towards Ed Daein. After their military victory, the rebels also announced that they had renamed the town into "Deim New Sudan" after the vision of SPLA leader John Garang for a Sudan of unity in diversity.

When the Khartoum government prepared for a counter-offensive to recapture Deim Zubeir, "the SPLA allegedly warned a security official with UN Operation Lifeline Sudan that the SPLA had used antipersonnel mines in October 2001 to defend the airstrip at Deim Zubeir". In November 2001 the government army took over Deim Zubeir again, with support from one of its Southern proxy militia, the South Sudan Defence Forces (SSDF). Subsequently, those pro-Khartoum forces engaged in a military campaign to expel the SPLA from the wider area, which resulted once more in mass displacement of civilians not only to northern Bahr el Ghazal, but also to Western Equatoria.

==== Comprehensive Peace Agreement (2005-2011) ====
In the 2005 Comprehensive Peace Agreement (CPA) between Khartoum and the SPLA, Deim Zubeir was designated as one of the five assembly places of the Sudanese Armed Forces in Bahr El Ghazal. According to the Catholic "Voice of Hope" radio station in Wau, the Salam Forces military of Major-General Eltom Elnur Daldoum, who has a Misseriya background and operated in the Deim Zubeir area, joined the Sudan Armed Forces and became part of the Joint Integrated Units in Wau during the interim period. The number of his fighters was estimated at 400.

Displaced people very soon started to return to Deim Zubeir as to the whole region, especially since the road to Wau was de-mined. In August 2005, a group of some 5,000 IDPs arrived after a 350-km journey from Western Equatoria at an interim camp in Bile, near Deim Zubeir. Their return was assisted by the International Organization for Migration (IOM) with support from the World Food Programme, OCHA, UNICEF, World Vision, MSF Spain - and the Comboni missionaries. Land allocation for the returnees did, however, not take place in the following years.

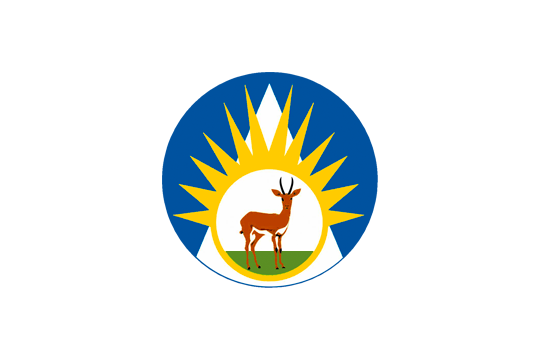
The flag of Western Bahr el Ghazal state

In 2008, the 5th Sudan Population and Housing Census counted a total population of 8,474 in the Uyujuku Payam, which comprised the administrative Boma sub-units of Yabulu, Kuru, Sopoi and Uyujuku with Deim Zubeir town. The figures revealed a remarkable gender gap: 4,765 (56.23%) were male, whereas only 3,709 (43.73%) were female. 67.1% of the male and 71.7% of the female residents were under 30 years old. In Uyujuku Boma itself, 3,025 residents were counted.

A 2009 field-study by the London School of Economics (LSE) found that some Deim Zubeir residents

"were mostly concerned with wanting the town's original tribal name 'Uyuku' back. At the same time, some residents wanted to join Aroyo County near Aweil in Northern Bahr el-Ghazal while others wanted to stay with Western Bahr el Gezal because they speak a similar language (Luer)."

A 2003 field-study of linguistics found that the Northern Lwoo language Thuri "is spoken by some 6000 individuals in small pockets in western Bahr el-Ghazal, around the towns of Deim Zubeir and Bora."

On 31 January 2010, Bishop Rudolf Deng of the Roman Catholic Diocese of Wau reopened Deim Zubeir parish. In the January 2011 referendum on the secession of Southern Sudan from Sudan, 1,100 voters in Deim Zubeir cast their ballot. 1,084 (98.91%) voted in favour of separation and 12 (1.09%) for unity with Northern Sudan with 4 invalid votes, according to official results. According to the figures of the Southern Sudan Referendum Commission (SSRC), 1,113 persons had been registered as voters beforehand, which means that the voter turnout was officially around 97.35%.

In March 2011, shortly before the independence of South Sudan it was announced that the Western Bahr el Ghazal State Government had launched a Television station in "Uyujuku (Dem - Zubeir)". Uyujuku is the Kresh name for the town of Deim Zubeir. The Comboni missionaries use the wording "Uyu-Juku (formerly called Deim Zubeir)". The SSRC spelled the name "Ujuku", while the LSE-paper spells it "Uyuku". According to a British paper from 1884, locals then used to call it "Juku". As there have been persistent calls by South Sudanese intellectuals to rename Deim Zubeir, it remains unclear whether the name has been officially changed at all.

=== South Sudan Independence (since 2011) ===
In August 2011, just weeks after South Sudan became an independent state, it was reported that the Lord's Resistance Army (LRA) had abducted a school teacher in Deim Zubeir / Uyujuku.

In mid-2012, a team of ten missionaries from a Texas-based evangelical organisation visited Deim Zubeir / Uyujuku and recorded 2,700 "Indicated Decisions For Christ", mainly from "animists" and Muslims.

In September 2012, the Catholic "Voice of Hope" radio station in Wau reported that General Daldoum's Salam Forces militia, which had been formed in the 1980s and formally joined the Khartoum government's Sudan Armed Forces in the Joint Integrated Units after the 2005 CPA (see 1.5.3 and 1.5.4 ), joined the SPLA Division Five in Wau.

A 2013 IOM survey found that Deim Zubeir / Uyujuku was covered by mobile phone networks. Major livelihoods were fishing as well as farming of Sorghum, Sesame, Groundnuts, and Cassava. However, on average there was only about one teacher per 60 students. In October of the same year, the Catholic Radio Network reported that in Deim Zubeir Payam children in "almost every household" were affected by epilepsy. In addition, 120 cases of Malaria were registered from July to September, "leaving many children dead".

==== Violent SPLA-power struggle (since 2013) ====
Soon after armed conflict between forces loyal to President Salva Kiir and militias of his political opponents broke out in South Sudan at the end of 2013, Deim Zubeir / Uyujuku and the neighbouring areas were once more affected by war. In 2014, groups from Deim Zubeir / Uyujuku quickly joined opposition cells in Bahr El Ghazal "under the auspices of the Fertit Lions".

In early 2015, it was reported that youth rioters broke into World Food Programme (WFP) stores in the town and stole bags of food after protests against the rations they were receiving.

A 2016 UNDP survey also mentions armed conflicts between agriculturalists and nomadic pastoralists in Deim Zubeir / Uyujuku.

In April 2016, President Kiir issued an order that divided Raga county, which Deim Zubeir / Uyujuku had been a part of, into three counties. Uyujuku has since become the administrative headquarter of Kuru county. Two months later, Lol State governor Rizik Hassan Zacharia appointed Lt. Col. Arkangelo Vestus Nimour as county commissioner.

At the same time, Deim Zubeir / Uyujuku apparently once again also became a strategic hub for Sudanese militias, namely the Justice and Equality Movement (JEM) from Darfur. In May 2016, Sudan Tribune reported that JEM units backed by troops from the government in Juba had clashed with opposition forces and captured their military base. The specialised news website also quoted a military intelligence officer in Wau as accusing "local people in the area of collaborating with armed groups by not giving them any information about their hideouts." In June 2016, the Sudanese government claimed that 11 detainees had managed to escape from a JEM camp in Deim Zubeir area, after it had been destroyed by South Sudanese rebels. Both the South Sudanese government and JEM have repeatedly denied such claims, but the final report of the Panel of Experts on the Sudan from December 2016 stated to the United Nations Security Council that "some sources informed the Panel of the existence of JEM bases in the Raja area and in Deim Zubeir."

Many more IDPs arrived in Deim Zubeir / Uyujuku from Raja after clashes in June 2016 and April 2017. In August 2017, the International Committee of the Red Cross reported that the population of Deim Zubeir was 54,000 people and included 18,000 displaced who had fled not only from Raja, but also from Korogana and Sopo.

In April 2018, more clashes took place "around" Deim Zubeir between government troops based in the town and rebel forces of former Vice-president Riek Machar. Both sides traded blame for the fighting and reported conflicting numbers of casualties. According to a report by the UN Security Council, the government forces were supported by JEM fighters and the clashes resulted in further civilian displacement.

In April 2023, more than 200 South Sudanese returned to Deim Zubeir from the CAR where they had previously sought refuge. They were followed shortly afterwards by about 4.000 people of CAR and DRC nationality who fled from violent clashes in the Eastern CAR. As the humanitarian situation for the local community was already dire before, the arrival of the new refugees escalated the lack of food, clean water, medical treatment and shelter.

== Potential UNESCO World Heritage site ==
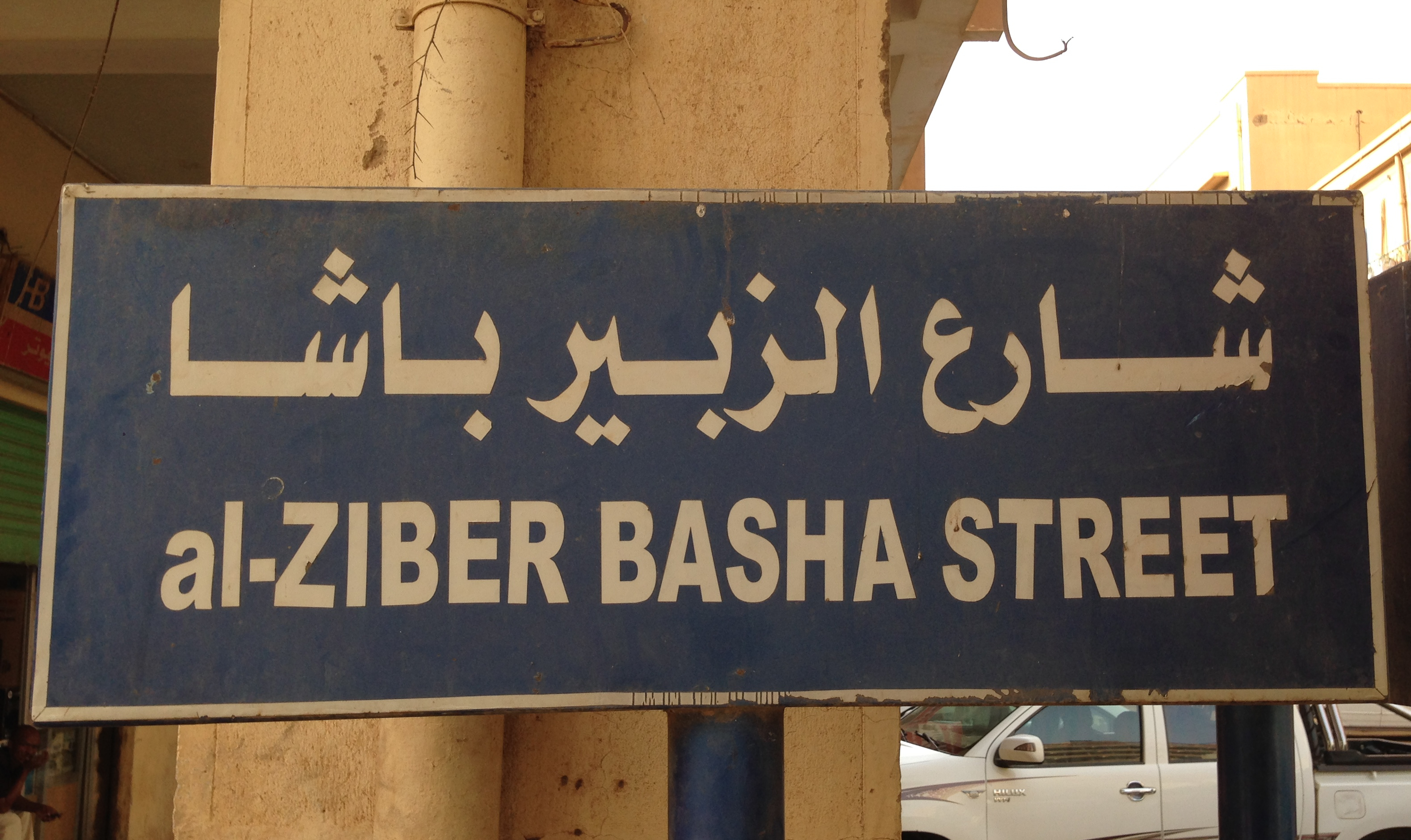
Zubeir Pasha Street in downtown Khartoum, 2018

On 3 October 2017, the government of South Sudan submitted the name of the historical site of the slave camp to the UNESCO World Heritage Centre to be included on its first ever Tentative List of potential World Heritage sites. The UNESCO report detailed the following:

"Zubeir Rahma constructed a trench and a fortification where slaves were kept awaiting to be transported to various destinations along the Nile northwards. The trench was built underground almost four meters deep and three kilometres long; wood and mud were used in the construction. The trench contains rooms used as prisons to confine the slaves, and on its edge is a tree renowned as a hanging place for slaves who attempted to escape from their captors. [..] Today, the Deim Zubeir slave trench is located by the present day main road from Wau to Raja in Wau County. It is not well maintained and needs urgent safeguarding to preserve its importance as a cultural heritage site. The tree that was notorious as the site of slave hangings remains next to the trench."

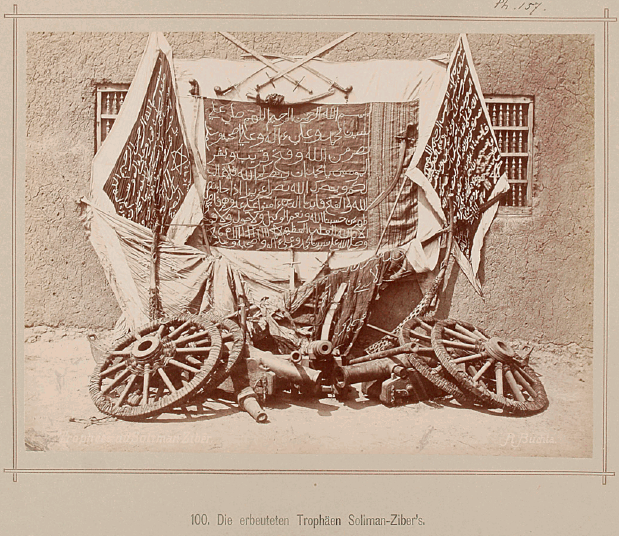
Gessi's trophy taken from Suleiman, photographed by Buchta in 1879

In its statement on authenticity and integrity, UNESCO added:

"The chiefs of the community in the Payam are also involved in collecting information and data about the site, including how it was affiliated with the former inhabitants' lifestyles and cultures. However, additional support is needed from historians and anthropologists to look into the shape and content of the trench, which is currently underground and unexcavated."

Historical items from Deim Zubeir are scattered across European museums. Artefacts taken as a trophy by Romolo Gessi were sold by his widow to the Museum of Ethnography and Prehistory in Rome. Parts of the collection were later transferred to other museums in Italy. In June 2019, UNESCO supported a field-mission to Deim Zubeir of South Sudanese expert Elfatih Atem, who is also director of a national non-governmental organisation, the Likikiri Collective, which has specialised in conducting oral history research. Atem worked

"to collect material evidence, photos of the landscape and narratives of slave trade and legacy of slavery at the site as part of South Sudan's efforts to justify its potential criteria for World Heritage listing. During his consultations, he raised awareness of the World Heritage Convention as well as the responsibilities and opportunities linked with World Heritage status. He also documented their stories, memories and experiences with the site."
