= Battle of Juba (1992) =

Failed SPLA attacks on Juba during the Second Sudanese Civil War

- Part of the Second Sudanese Civil War
| Date | 7 June and 6–15 July 1992 |
| Location | Juba, southern Sudan (present-day South Sudan) 4°51′N 31°36′E |
| Result | Sudanese government victory |
| Territorial changes | Government forces retained Juba |

Belligerents
| Government of Sudan: Sudanese Armed Forces; Police, prison and wildlife forces | SPLM/A–Torit: Sudan People's Liberation Army |

Commanders and leaders
| Omar al-Bashir (commander-in-chief); Haider Mohammed Mahdi; Abdulrahim Ibrahim Al-Ata | John Garang (overall); Oyai Deng Ajak (Juba front) |

Units involved
| Southern Military Command: 116th Artillery Battalion; Juba garrison | SPLA–Torit assault forces |

Strength
| Unknown | Unknown |

Casualties and losses
| Unknown | Unknown |
- At least 198 wounded evacuated after the June attack; total losses unknown

The Battle of Juba consisted of two attacks by the Sudan People's Liberation Army (SPLA) against the Sudanese government garrison at Juba during the Second Sudanese Civil War. Conducted on 7 June and from 6 to 15 July 1992 as part of Operation Jungle Storm, the attacks sought to capture the main government military and administrative centre in southern Sudan.

SPLA forces penetrated Juba and briefly occupied parts of the Southern Military Command headquarters, but government troops retained the airport and other fortified positions. The attackers failed to connect their separate penetrations or establish secure supply routes and were eventually driven from the city.

The fighting caused extensive displacement and destruction. Artillery struck residential districts and threatened relief operations, while the government response included mass arrests, disappearances and reported extrajudicial killings.

== Background ==
The civil war began in 1983 following army mutinies in southern Sudan and the formation of the SPLA. The government retained the principal towns through fortified garrisons, aircraft and river transport, while the SPLA operated mainly from the countryside and attempted to isolate the towns by attacking roads, vessels and outlying posts.

Juba, on the western bank of the White Nile, was the government's principal base in Equatoria. It contained the Southern Military Command headquarters, an airport, barracks, artillery positions, government offices and fuel and communications facilities. Because road and river access were threatened by SPLA ambushes and mines, the airport became the city's main military and humanitarian supply route.

By 1992, Juba had an estimated population of about 287,000. Although it lay within the customary territory of the Bari people, its population included displaced Equatorians, military families, officials and people who had fled SPLA operations in the surrounding countryside.

Loyalties did not follow a simple northern–southern division. Southern Sudanese served in the government army, police, prisons, customs, civil administration and wildlife service. Some remained loyal to the government, while others supported or later defected to the SPLA.

The government also armed southern groups opposed to the SPLA. These included remnants of Anyanya II, associated largely with Nuer commanders, and militias drawn from sections of the Bari, Latuka, Mundari, Didinga, Toposa, Murle, Fertit and some Dinka communities.

These forces did not form a unified tribal army. Their motives included communal defence, disputes over land, cattle and local authority, opposition to forced recruitment and requisitioning, and resentment of SPLA abuses. Some Equatorians also feared that the SPLA's Dinka-dominated senior command would replace northern rule with Dinka political and military domination.

Around Juba, Bari opposition to the SPLA centred on land, chiefly authority and political autonomy. North of the city, hostility among sections of the Mundari was intensified by clashes with SPLA forces and neighbouring Dinka pastoralists. These tensions shaped the political environment of the battle, although no organised Bari or Mundari militia is firmly documented as fighting inside Juba in 1992.

== Prelude ==
In August 1991, the SPLM/A split. John Garang retained the SPLA-Torit faction, while Riek Machar and Lam Akol formed the SPLA-Nasir faction. The split diverted rebel troops from government fronts and caused fighting between the rival factions.

The government exploited the division by launching Operation Summer Crossing (صيف العبور) in early 1992. Government forces advanced through Bahr el Ghazal, Upper Nile and Eastern Equatoria, relieving or recapturing several garrisons.

Government troops retook Liria, on the Juba–Torit road, on 12 May. By then, the SPLA had begun evacuating non-essential personnel and equipment from Torit, the headquarters of Garang's faction.

On 28 May, government troops and Toposa militia captured Kapoeta in a surprise attack. The Toposa contributed local knowledge of routes, water sources and terrain, while government regulars advanced with vehicles and armour.

The fall of Kapoeta was accompanied by ethnic and retaliatory violence. Dinka civilians were reportedly killed, detained and looted, while SPLA forces were later accused of attacks on Toposa villages in retaliation for the militia's role in the government advance.

The attacks on Juba were intended to reverse the government offensive. Capturing the city would have eliminated the Southern Military Command and closed the principal government airhead in Equatoria. However, concentrating SPLA forces around Juba further weakened the defence of Torit.

== Battle ==
=== First attack ===
The first assault began at 5:00 a.m. on 7 June 1992. SPLA forces advanced from the south through Lalogo and other peripheral districts. Exact strength and routes remain uncertain.

Streams, thickets, and slums concealed the approach but fragmented columns and restricted vehicle movement. Government forces held the airport, headquarters, barracks, and artillery positions.

Some southern personnel defected or collaborated, including Major Thomas Cirillo; his brother, retired Major General Peter Cirillo, was later arrested. Other collaborators remain undocumented.

SPLA troops penetrated the main military area, briefly holding part of the Southern Command headquarters and overrunning the 116th Artillery Battalion. Government forces prevented full capture of the headquarters and airport.

Unable to link penetrations or secure a bridgehead, the SPLA withdrew later that day. Khartoum claimed that 69 northern soldiers were killed while sleeping in their barracks.

Heavy weapons struck military and civilian areas alike. At least 198 wounded were evacuated to Kenya; an estimated 50,000 residents fled westward.

=== Defence ===
Following the June assault, the government reinforced the principal military positions in Juba, including the airport, the Southern Command headquarters, the main barracks, mechanized positions near the White Nile bridge, and the southern approaches. The defence was conducted by the Juba garrison and formations attached to the Equatoria military area, including the Martyr Marhum and Martyr Abd al-Jalil brigades, which had been placed in Juba during preparations for Operation Summer Crossing.

An advance element of headquarters had earlier been deployed to Juba under Brigadier Haj Ahmad al-Jili, Colonel Hamid Abd al-Latif, and Lieutenant Colonel Badawi Mustafa al-Khair to supervise preparations in the theatre. Major General Sayyid Ahmad Hamad Muhammad Siraj remained the overall commander of the campaign. President Omar al-Bashir approved the campaign plan as commander-in-chief.

The airport remained the decisive node; the city's sole link to the wider Sudan, carrying military supplies, food, medicine, and humanitarian aid.

A comprehensive security purge followed. Over eighty southern soldiers, police, prison guards, and wildlife officers were detained on suspicion of collaboration. Customs officials, technicians, church workers, and youth organizers were also arrested.

A later Sudanese military account credited then-Captain Yasser al-Atta with leading a light force that located and neutralized an SPLA rocket launcher which had been shelling Juba Airport.

=== Second attack ===
The second assault began on 6 July. SPLA columns advanced through White Nile inlets and the southern suburbs, entering Lalogo, Kator, and Rejaf West. They occupied several civilian districts but failed to take any military holding, headquarters or airport, remaining separated by military strongpoints and urban terrain.

Khartoum's artillery and mechanized forces counterattacked. Unable to secure a bridgehead, the SPLA shifted to long-range shelling of the airport and command from ~10 km away. SPLA commander Oyai Deng Ajak later confirmed this tactic, which repeatedly endangered civilians.

The airport stayed operational throughout, sustaining government supply lines. Government forces progressively retook contested areas, and SPLA troops withdrew after roughly ten days.

On 11 July, the government ordered Lalogo and Kator evacuated.

A shell form SPLA artillery struck the UNDP compound on 13 July. Continued shelling near the airport disrupted relief flights through July and August.

== Aftermath ==
=== Military outcome ===
Holding strategic positions, the government defeated two SPLA attacks that failed due to poor logistics and lack of urban control.

The attack also affected the wider Eastern Equatoria campaign. While the SPLA concentrated on Juba, government forces captured Torit on 13 July, depriving Garang's faction of its headquarters and principal operational base.

Juba remained the government's main Equatoria garrison for the rest of the war. Government forces held the city and airport, while the SPLA continued to control or contest much of the surrounding countryside.

The Comprehensive Peace Agreement ended the war in 2005. Juba subsequently became the capital of the SPLA, the autonomous Government of Southern Sudan and, in 2011, of independent South Sudan.

=== Civilian consequences ===
The battle deepened divisions as southern personnel split between the government and SPLA, while government security targeted collaborators.

Amnesty International and Human Rights Watch reported arbitrary arrests, torture, disappearances and extrajudicial killings affecting soldiers, civil servants, church workers, youths and prominent families.

Residents of Lalogo, Kator and other districts were forcibly displaced. Those affected included Bari and other Equatorians, government employees and previously displaced civilians.

SPLA shelling also endangered Juba Airport, which was both a military objective and the city's principal route for food, medicine and humanitarian relief. The battle reflected the war: the government held towns while the SPLA controlled the countryside, isolating garrisons.

== See also ==
- Second Sudanese Civil War
- Sudan People's Liberation Army
- Sudanese Armed Forces
- History of Juba
