= Peace Army =

Peace Army may refer to:

- Army of Peace, which was also known as "Peace Army"
- Women's Peace Army
