= Lilian Passmore Sanderson =

English teacher and activist against female genital mutilation

Lilian Margaret Passmore Sanderson (22 February 1925 – 16 September 1996) was an English teacher and educationalist who became known for her research on female genital mutilation, particularly in Sudan. She was the author of Against the Mutilation of Women: The Struggle Against Unnecessary Suffering (1981) and Female Genital Mutilation, Excision and Infibulation: A Bibliography (1986).

== Early life and education ==
Born Lilian Passmore, Sanderson attended Barnstaple Girls' Grammar School in Devon, before graduating in 1947 with a BA (as an external degree) from Exeter University College. In 1948 she obtained a Diploma of Education (DipEd), also from Exeter, and in 1962 an MA from the University of London for a thesis entitled "A history of education in the Sudan with special reference to the development of girls' schools". In 1966 she was awarded a PhD, also by the University of London; her thesis was "Education in the southern Sudan, 1898–1948".

== Career ==
After obtaining her diploma from Exeter, Sanderson taught at a girls' school in High Wycombe, then in 1951 accepted a post in Egypt to teach at the English Girls' College in Alexandria. From 1953 she taught at Omdurman Girls' Secondary School in Omdurman, Sudan, and from 1954 to 1958 served as headmistress of Omdurman Intermediate School. From then until 1962, she was headmistress at Khartoum Girls' Secondary School; she wrote that the school represented "the greatest single development in government secondary education for girls in the Sudan". From 1962 she taught for one year at the University of Khartoum.

Sanderson left Sudan in 1964, after which she taught at Buckinghamshire College of Higher Education in Chalfont St Giles until 1980 and campaigned to end FGM. In 1980 she wrote a report for the University of London on "Education in the Middle East with special reference to the Sudan, Egypt and education for the eradication of female genital mutilation" and she worked with Asma El Dareer, author of a classic study on FGM in Sudan, Woman, Why Do You Weep? (1982).

== Personal life ==
In May 1960 Sanderson married George Neville Sanderson, with whom she wrote Education, Religion and Politics in Southern Sudan, 1899–1964 (1981). The couple had three children. She died of cancer in 1996.

== Selected works ==
- More, Margaret, pseudonym for Lilian Sanderson (April 1958). "Women's Progress in the Sudan: Spread of Education Is Bringing a Fuller Life". African World: 11.
- Sanderson, Lilian M. (1961). "Some Aspects of the Development of Girls' Education in the Northern Sudan". Sudan Notes and Records. 42: 99–101. JSTOR 41716940.
- Sanderson, Lilian (1963). "Educational development and administrative control in the Nuba mountains region of the Sudan". Journal of African History. 4 (2): 233–247. doi:10.1017/S0021853700004047. S2CID 162963591.
- Sanderson, Lilian (1 January 1968). "The Development of Girls' Education in the Northern Sudan, 1898–1960". Paedagogica Historica. 8 (1–2): 120–152. doi:10.1080/0030923680080106.
- Sanderson, Lilian M. (1976). "The Sudan Interior Mission and the Condominium Sudan, 1937–1955". Journal of Religion in Africa. 8 (1): 13–40. doi:10.1163/157006676X00156. JSTOR 1716940.
- Sanderson, Lilian (April 1980). "Education in the Southern Sudan: The Impact of Government-Missionary-Southern Sudanese Relationships upon the Development of Education during the Condominium Period, 1898–1956". African Affairs. 79 (315): 157–170. doi:10.1093/oxfordjournals.afraf.a097203.
- Sanderson, Lilian Passmore; Sanderson, Neville (1981). Education, Religion and Politics in Southern Sudan, 1899–1964. London and Khartoum: Ithaca Press and Khartoum University Press.
- Sanderson, Lilian Passmore (1981). Against the Mutilation of Women: The Struggle Against Unnecessary Suffering. London: Ithaca Press. ISBN 978-0903729673.
- Sanderson, Lilian P. (October 1981). "Progress of work in the Sudan for abolition of female circumcision". Tropical Doctor. 11 (4): 186. doi:10.1177/004947558101100414. S2CID 74162789. Archived from the original on 28 August 2019.
- Sanderson, Lilian Passmore (1986). Female Genital Mutilation, Excision and Infibulation: A Bibliography. London: The Anti-Slavery Society for the Protection of Human Rights. OCLC 43525402.
