= Female genital mutilation in Sudan =

Female genital mutilation (FGM) is highly prevalent in Sudan. According to a 2014 Multiple Indicator Cluster Survey (MICS), 86.6 percent of women aged 15–49 in Sudan reported living with FGM, and said that 31.5 percent of their daughters had been cut. The most common FGM procedure in that country is Type III (infibulation); the 2014 survey found that 77 percent of respondents had experienced Type III.

Most FGM procedures in Sudan have traditionally been performed by local circumcisers without anaesthesia or antibiotics. The 2014 survey indicated that 77 percent of the 0–14 age group had been cut by health personnel, according to their mothers, and 20 percent by traditional circumcisers. Most girls (66 percent) are cut between ages 5–9.

== Type of FGM ==
The most common FGM procedure in Sudan is Type III, also known as "pharaonic circumcision" and referred to in surveys as "sewn closed". This involves removal of the inner and/or outer labia, with or without removal of the clitoral glans, and fusion of the wound, leaving a small hole for the passage of urine and menstrual blood. As of 1990, 3.5 million of the country's 4.8 million women aged 15–49 were thought to be living with infibulation.

== Age cut ==
According to Asma El Dareer in Woman, Why Do You Weep? (1982), most FGM in Sudan at that time was carried out on girls aged 4–8 and sometimes as young as 7 days. In the 2014 MICS, 66 percent of those cut said they had undergone the procedure at age 5–9; 14 percent at 10–14; 10 percent at 15 or older; and 9 percent at 4 or younger.

== Prevalence ==
The 2014 MICS found that 77 percent of respondents had experienced Type III. The states with the highest prevalence of any form of FGM were North Kordofan, Northern, North Darfur, and East Darfur, where over 97 percent of women reported having been cut. Gezira had the highest number. Northern had the highest percentage of Type III; 94.6 percent of those who had experienced any form of FGM had been sewn closed.

== Law ==
Sudan introduced legislation against Type III FGM in 1946, but it was widely ignored, and in 1983, it was removed entirely with the introduction of Sharia law. Attempts since then to criminalize it, including with the National Child Act of 2009, had failed before 2020.

FGM was criminalized in Sudan in 2020. Offenders can be fined and sent to prison for three years, although human rights advocates note that it may be difficult to enforce the law.
