= Woman, Why Do You Weep? =

1982 book by Asma El Dareer

Woman, Why Do You Weep? Circumcision and Its Consequences
- Author: Asma El Dareer
- Language: English
- Subject: Female genital mutilation in Sudan
- Genre: Non-fiction
- Publisher: Zed Books and Babiker Bedri Scientific Association for Women's Studies
- Publication date: 1982
- Publication place: United Kingdom
- Pages: 144 (hardback)
- ISBN: 0-8090-7350-1

Woman, Why Do You Weep? Circumcision and Its Consequences (1982) is a book by Sudanese physician Asma El Dareer about female genital mutilation in Sudan. Published in London by Zed Press in association with the Babiker Bedri Scientific Association for Women's Studies, the book summarizes research El Dareer conducted on female genital mutilation (FGM) for the medical faculty of the University of Khartoum.

The book includes information from El Dareer's 1977–1981 survey of over 3,000 women in Sudanese states with a high prevalence of the most severe form of FGM. It was the first large-scale survey of women who had undergone the procedures.

== Background ==
In 1946, during the Anglo-Egyptian condominium in Sudan (1899–1955), the British outlawed Type III FGM (infibulation), a ban that was widely ignored. Type III was and remains highly prevalent in Sudan. Known in the country as "pharaonic circumcision", the procedure involves removing the inner labia and part of the outer labia, and sewing the vulva closed, leaving a very small hole for the passage of urine and menstrual blood. The vagina is opened slightly (with the penis or a knife) for intercourse, opened further for childbirth, and closed again afterwards. Closing the vagina after childbirth, and perhaps before a remarriage, is known as reinfibulation.

== Synopsis ==
=== Survey ===
El Dareer interviewed 3,210 women and 1,545 men in five Sudanese states: Blue Nile, Darfur, Kassala, Khartoum, and Kordofan. Of the 3,210, 98 percent (3,171) said they had undergone FGM, and 83.13 percent (2,636) said they had experienced pharaonic circumcision. Another 12.17 percent (386) reported having an intermediate form of FGM, and 2.5 percent (80) said they had Type Ia, removal of the clitoral hood, known within practicing countries as sunna. The remaining 69 women could not describe their procedure.

=== Typology ===
The book describes three forms of pharaonic circumcision: "classical", "modernized", and a more severe form practiced in Kordofan. The "classical" consists of removing the clitoral glans, inner labia and outer labia, and fusing the two sides. Thorns were used in Central and Northern Sudan, while in Eastern Sudan, adhesives (such as sugar, egg and cigarette papers) were left on the wound for 3–15 days. The girl's legs are bound at the ankle, knees and thighs for 15–40 days. A thorn may be inserted into the wound so that a small hole remains. Substances may be applied to the wound to prevent infection; in Western Sudan, animal faeces were used. The "modernized" form is the same, except that only part of the outer labia are removed, and the wound is stitched together; this form was usually carried out by trained midwives using anaesthesia, and the girls' legs were bound together for seven days.

In Kordofan, the Shanabla people practiced a third version: "In this type an additional V-shaped cut is made downwards of the vaginal orifice and the sides stitched together from below upwards to result in a very small hole. The girl who is circumcised in this manner is called makhtoma."

In El Dareer's book, sunna (referring to the customs of Islam) describes Type Ia FGM, removal of the tip of the clitoral hood only. Of the women surveyed, 2.5 percent said they had experienced this. (According to the World Health Organization, Type Ia is rarely performed alone.) The Sudanese regarded this as "no circumcision at all", according to El Dareer; they referred to it as "Government sunna" because the British had recommended it after the 1946 ban. There were two other versions of sunna. Sunna magatia ("covered sunna") involved removing the clitoral glans and roughening the inner labia to allow stitching. Sunna kashfa ("uncovered sunna") was the removal of the tip of the clitoral glans with no stitching.

El Dareer describes an "intermediate" form. Forged as a compromise between pharaonic and sunna, it is known as tahur El Dayat or "midwives' circumcision" and involves removal of the clitoral glans, some or all of the inner labia, and "slices" of the outer labia; the sides are stitched together, leaving a somewhat larger hole than with pharaonic.

=== Preferences ===
Of the 3,210 women, 59 percent said they preferred one of the severe forms (pharaonic or intermediate), while 64 percent of the men preferred sunna, the mildest form.
