= Army of Peace =

Sudanese militia

- جيش السلام; Jaysh al-Salam
- Leader: Maj. Gen. Atom Al-Nour
- Dates active: 1986–2000s (Note: Though de facto disbanded sometime between 2005 and 2010, the militia's network and associated militants remain active as of 2018.)
- Allegiance: Sudan
- Headquarters: Wau, Sudan
- Active regions: Western Bahr el Ghazal, Sudan
- Ideology: Fertit solidarity Anti-Dinka sentiment Anti-Thuri sentiment
- Part of: PDF (1989–1997); SSDF (from 1997)
- Wars: the Second Sudanese Civil War

The Army of Peace (Arabic: جيش السلام, romanized: Jaysh al-Salam) was a large alliance of Fertit tribal militias in Western Bahr el Ghazal during the Second Sudanese Civil War. Although initially armed by the Sudanese government in order to fight against South Sudanese separatists, the Army of Peace became especially notorious for massacring Dinka civilians. These mass killings grew so excessive that the group even came into violent conflicts with other pro-government forces. The militia was mostly disbanded in 1988, though a rump faction continued to be active and joined the Popular Defence Forces in 1989, and later the South Sudan Defense Forces (SSDF) in 1997.

== Name ==
The Arabic name of the militia was Jaysh al-Salam (Arabic: جيش السلام, alternatively transliterated Jesh al Salam) which can be translated "Army of Peace" or "Peace Army". It was also known as "Peace Force" (Arabic: قوات السلام, romanized: Quwat al-Salam, alternatively transliterated Qwat Salem), "(Fertit) Friendly Forces" (al-Quwat al-Sadiqqa), "National Peace Forces", "Peace Defence Forces", or simply the "Fertit militia".

== History ==
=== Foundation ===
Tensions between Fertit and Dinka in Western Bahr el Ghazal grew after the independence of Sudan from the United Kingdom and Egypt in 1956. Many Fertit believed that they were discriminated against by Dinka who increasingly dominated the administration of the southern Sudan. These lingering hostilities grew worse after the Dinka-dominated Sudan People's Liberation Army (SPLA) launched an uprising against the Sudanese government in 1983, resulting in the Second Sudanese Civil War. Few Fertit joined the SPLA, considering it a tool of "Dinka hegemony", and in turn the SPLA considered the Fertit to be an ethnic group "hostile" to the rebellion. SPLA fighters launched a number of destructive raids on Fertit villages in 1985, mostly to acquire supplies to continue their guerrilla campaign.

A number of Fertit leaders consequently banded together in the surroundings of Wau and Raga, and organised the "Army of Peace" militia as self-defense force. It was supposed to defend Fertit communities from the SPLA, but was also supposed to enact revenge on Dinka and Jur tribal communities that were blamed for the increasing violence. Not all Fertit tribes supported the new militia, and some tribal leaders vehemently opposed the formation of the Army of Peace and the arming of civilians in general. Those tribal groups that did support the militia were mostly victims of SPLA raids on their villages. One of the most notable Fertit tribes that did not participate in the Army of Peace was the Thuri or Shatt people. Many Fertit tribal leaders distrusted the Thuri/Shatt due to them speaking a language that was similar to Jur and Dinka languages, and even alleged that the Thuri had aided the SPLA raids. The newly formed militia consequently attacked Turi villages, forcing locals to flee to Awoda where they actually joined the SPLA. In the following years Fertit fighters thus fought on both sides in the civil war.

After new raids on their territory, the Fertit leaders who supported the Army of Peace asked the governor of Bahr el Ghazal for help, but he refused. They consequently approached the Sudanese Armed Forces (SAF) for support. They appointed a local official of mixed ethnicity as militia leader, Atom Al-Nour (also transliterated "El Tom El Nour" or "Eltom Elnur"). The Sudanese government began to support the militia in 1986, while Captain Raphael Kitang, a retired army officer, became one of its most important commanders. The Army of Peace initially operated autonomous and exclusively in the surroundings of Wau, where it defended local villages from insurgents from 1986 to early 1987. Already at a very early stage, however, the militia became notorious for many human rights violations such as the assassination of critical Fertit and Dinka tribal leaders as well as politicians, and most notably the indiscriminate killing and torture of Dinka civilians, including the murder of children and pregnant women.

=== 1987 campaign and later activity ===
The Army of Peace drastically expanded its operations after the arrival of SAF reinforcements in July 1987. These reinforcements included the infamous 242 Battalion (also known as "Hun" or "Genghis Khan Battalion") and were led by Maj-Gen Abu Gurun Abdullah Abu Gurun, nicknamed "Hitler" due to his brutality. Receiving better weaponry including tanks, the militia then began to act as auxiliary force to the SAF as new counter-insurgency operations were launched. In August of that year, the group as well as the Sudanese army massacred hundreds of Dinka in Wau, causing the local Dinka-dominated Wau Police and Wildlife Forces to take up arms in order to defend the civilian population. The following intra-government fighting was extremely brutal and hundreds were killed. Dinka members of the police and Wildlife Forces formed death squads to retaliate against the militia, while the Army of Peace in return attacked the police headquarters with tanks in August. Meanwhile, the Sudan People's Liberation Army (SPLA) mostly evicted the Fertit militia from the rural areas around Wau. Only with Abu Gurun's departure in November did the situation in Wau calm down. With the support of the newly appointed county commissioner Lawrence Lual Lual, local Fertit community leaders managed to negotiate a peace agreement, according to which members of the Army of Peace received an amnesty and were reaccepted into the community, while administrative posts in Wau were to be equally distributed between Dinka and Fertit. Most of the militia subsequently demobilized in July 1988, though a rump faction remained active and continued to fight alongside the SAF, and was integrated into the Popular Defence Forces (PDF) in December 1989.

The Army of Peace continued to be active as part of the PDF until 1997, when it switched to the South Sudan Defense Forces (SSDF). The SSDF was created by the Sudanese government to unify to different South Sudanese pro-government militias into a single movement. While serving with the SSDF, the Army of Peace continued to be officially led by Atom Al-Nour, who had risen to major-general in the SAF by 2006. The Army of Peace still enjoyed substantial support among the Fertit tribes during the last phase of the civil war, and continued to be most active around Wau, although it also had presence in other parts of Western Bahr el Ghazal. Following the Juba Declaration of 8 January 2006, the SSDF began to disintegrate, but Atom Al-Nour along with his followers remained loyal though he had started to delegate command of the Army of Peace to a Brig. Stance Kamilo who was widely respected in Wau. The Army of Peace was fully integrated into the Sudanese Armed Forces and SPLA between 2005 and 2010.
