= Thuri people =

Ethnic group of South Sudan

Thuri / Shatt
Thuri

Regions with significant populations
- South Sudan: c. 9,000

Languages
- Thuri

Religion
- Thuri ethnic religions, Christianity

Related ethnic groups
- Luo peoples, Fertit peoples

The Thuri, also known as Shatt, and Luo people of South Sudan. They speak DheThuri, a Luo language that is similar to the Jur and Dinka languages. Having been perceived as close to the Dinka people, the Thuri were targets of ethnic violence during the Second Sudanese Civil War, when the "Army of Peace", a mostly Fertit pro-government militia, attacked them as supporters of the mostly Dinka SPLA rebels. This caused many Thuri to take up arms and to join the SPLA in order to take revenge against other Fertit groups.

== Bibliography ==
- Blocq, Daniel S. (2017). "The Grassroots Nature of Counterinsurgent Tribal Militia Formation: The Case of the Fertit in Southern Sudan, 1985–1989". In David M. Anderson; Øystein H. Rolandsen (eds.). Politics and Violence in Eastern Africa: The Struggles of Emerging States. Abingdon-on-Thames, UK; New York: Routledge. pp. 172–186. ISBN 978-1-138-05961-0.
