= Babiker Bedri Scientific Association for Women's Studies =

Sudanese feminist association

The Babiker Bedri Scientific Association for Women's Studies (BBSAWS, also written as "Babiker Badri") was formed in Sudan in 1979 after a symposium in February that year, "The Changing Status of Women in Sudan", at Ahfad University for Women in Omdurman. Open to educated women from Sudan, the association's early aims were to set up welfare and education programmes for women in the White Nile and Red Sea states, and to end female genital mutilation, which has a high prevalence in Sudan. Asma El Dareer was one of the association's presidents.

The association was named after Sheikh Babiker Bedri, who in 1907 opened the first girls' school in Rufaa, Sudan. This was regarded as the beginning of the women's liberation movement in that country.

== Pledge to end FGM ==
FGM was traditionally a taboo subject in Sudan, "a ritual performed by women on women". In 1981, BBSAWS held a three-day workshop in Khartoum, "Female Circumcision Mutilates and Endangers Women – Combat it!", at the end of which 150 academics and activists signed a pledge to fight FGM:

Whereas, we have closely studied the impact of female circumcision and its harmful effects and heard the viewpoint of religious leaders, medical and psychosocial professionals, We the participants in the workshop, "Female Circumcision Mutilates and Endangers Women – Combat it!" organized by the Babiker Badri Scientific Association for Women's Studies, held in Khartoum from 8 to 10 March 1981, agree to fight this harmful tradition, which mutilates the appearance of what God has created and harms women both physically and mentally, thus putting their lives in danger. By unequivoally renouncing the practice of female circumcision, we commit ourselves to employ all the intellectual and physical resources available to us to fight this harmful tradition. We commit to becoming role models and educators for our families, neighbors, and communities. We pledge our commitment by signing this document (BBSAWS 1981).

Another BBSAWS workshop in 1984, "African Women Speak on Female Circumcision", attracted participants from 24 African countries and around the world. The workshop agreed that FGM is "a violation of human rights, an encroachment on the dignity of women, a debasement of women's sexuality, and an unwarranted affront on the health of women". Identifying it as a human-rights violation was an important step; previously FGM had been regarded as a medical problem, possibly with a medical solution.
