= Kayongo =

Kayongo is a surname. Notable people with the surname include:

- Derreck Kayongo (born 1970), Uganda entrepreneur
- Mohammed Kayongo (born 1980), Ugandan boxer
- Martin Kayongo-Mutumba (born 1985), Swedish footballer
