= Lawrence Lual Lual =

Sudanese politician (1940–2011)

Lawrence Lual Lual لورينس لوال لوال
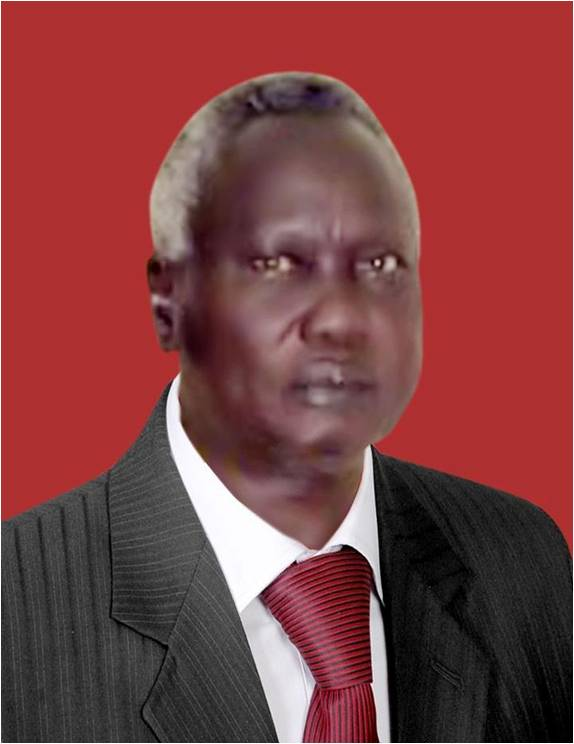

Deputy Speaker of the Southern Sudan Legislative Assembly
- In office 2008–2010

Member of Parliament for Aweil South
- In office 2005–2008

Member of Parliament for Paliet
- In office 1999–2005

Minister for Education
- In office 1990–1994

Personal details
- Born: 1940
- Died: 2011 (aged 71)
- Party: National Congress (from 1998)
- Other political affiliations: SPLM (until 1998)
- Education: University of Khartoum

Lawrence Lual Lual Akuei (1940 - 2011) was a South Sudanese politician born in Mathiang-Agor village of Ajak area into a family of spiritual leader Lual Akuei Lual of Pakuein Paan-Deng sub-clan of Agaal-Liil section.

== Education ==
1951-1952: Malek-alel Bush school 1952-1954: Nyamellel Elementary School 1955-1960: St. Anthony Bussery Intermediate School 1960–1964: Rumbek Secondary School 1964-1968: University of Khartoum, Faculty of Liberal Arts, graduating with honours degree in Literature & Geography

== Employment and Work Experience ==
Lual was elected in the 1968 election as the Member of the Khartoum based National Assembly for Constituency 132, consisting of the Paliet area. He served in this role until 1969, when he returned to teaching.

From 1969 to 1972 Lual taught in several Sudanese high schools. First he taught at Kosti in Bahr el Ghazal from 1969 to 1970. Next he taught at Madina Arab Secondary School from 1970 to 1971. Finally he taught at Hantoub, Mzdeni & Rufaa High from 1971 to 1972. In 1972 he returned to Khartoum University to study a post-graduate course in education, graduating in 1973.

Member of Relief & Rehabilitation of Refugees and Returnees Commission (RRRRC) headed by late Clement Mboro

1975–1978 Minister of Education & Guidance on Regional government.

1979 – 1980 Cabinet Minister under General Joseph Lagu Yanga’s Presidency of the High Executive Council

1983-1985 Regional Assembly, Wau (Greater Bhar El Ghazal Region) as MP representing constituency of Paliet on the wake of re-division of Southern Sudan Region into 3 Regions, BGR, Upper Nile and Equatoria.

1980 Secretary for Development Services at Regional Secretariat of Sudan Socialist Union (SSU)

1985–1987 General Secretary of Southern Sudan Political Association (SSPA)

1987-1988 General Secretary of Southern Sudan Political Association Democratic Wing headed By Syed Aldo Ajou Deng Akuei

1988–1989 Governor of Bhar El Ghazal Region.

1990 SPLM/SPLA Minister of Education-New Sudan

1994–1997 NLC Secretary for Education & Guidance (New Sudan) Chukudum SPLM/SPLA 1st National Convention

1997 Khartoum Peace Agreement Secretary for Political Committee for Education Review and Comprehensive National Strategy (CNS).

=== Split from the SPLA ===
Lual, then serving as the leader of the SPLM/A Bahr el Ghazal group, broke from the United Democratic Salvation Front of Riek Machar in October 1998, claiming that Machar had removed all of Lual's appointees from government posts. Lual claimed to have taken 1,500 forces with him, of whom 400 were working with Maj. Gen. Paulino Matip Nhial's SSDF.

After his break from the UDSF Lual joined the ruling National Congress Party, becoming the Deputy Secretary of the NCP's Political Bureau (Maktab al Siyasi) in 1998. Lual, proceeded to contest, and win, his former seat of Paliet in the 2000 National Assembly elections on an NCP ticket.

From 2002 to 2003 Lula served as NCP Deputy Secretary under Professor Ibrahim Ahmed Omar.

In 2005 Lual was appointed as an NCP MP for the southern seat of Aweil South, in the newly formed Southern Sudan Legislative Assembly.

From 2008 to 2010 Lual served as Deputy Speaker of the Southern Sudan Legislative Assembly.

== Awards and achievements ==
1999-Honorary Doctorate of Philosophy (PhD) in Law, Khartoum University

1991 Member of negotiating team for the SPLM in Abuja-One Peace Talks

Awarded by the Chairman of University of Bhar El Ghazal’s Board of Directors

Vice Chancellors twice under Mathew Atem Aduol and Timothy Telar.
