= Asma El Dareer =

Sudanese physician

- Born: 1949 (age 76–77)
- Citizenship: Sudan
- Notable works: Woman, Why Do You Weep?

Asma Abdel Rahim El Dareer (born c. 1949) is a Sudanese physician known for her research in the 1980s into female genital mutilation. She was one of the first Arab women and feminist doctors to speak out publicly against the practice.

A former deputy director of health statistics and research for the Sudanese Ministry of Health, El Dareer led a research project into FGM at the University of Khartoum faculty of medicine from 1977 to 1981. As part of this project, she conducted the first large-scale survey of women who had experienced FGM, interviewing 3,210 women and 1,545 men in five Sudanese provinces with a high prevalence of Type III FGM (infibulation).

El Dareer is the author of Woman, Why Do You Weep: Circumcision and its Consequences (1982) and co-author of Female Circumcision in the Sudan: Prevalence, Complications, Attitudes and Change (1983). She is a former president of the Babiker Bedri Scientific Association for Women's Studies.

== Background ==
El Dareer became interested in FGM when she was infibulated by a nurse at age 11 in 1960. In Woman, Why Do You Weep, she wrote that the wound became infected and that she was given five injections of penicillin. When she was 18, her younger sister also underwent FGM. Her father wanted a milder form, but her mother insisted on infibulation, which is known in Sudan as "pharaonic circumcision". A compromise was reached and her sister ended up with an intermediate form that was nevertheless very similar to infibulation.

In the 1970s El Dareer studied medicine at the University of Khartoum. She began studying FGM as a fifth-year medical student when she wrote a research paper for a course on community medicine. In 1977 the faculty of medicine chose her to head a research project into FGM in Sudan. She obtained her MSc in 1981. Her books, Woman, Why Do You Weep and the co-authored Female Circumcision in the Sudan: Prevalence, Complications, Attitudes and Change, summarize that research.

== Selected works ==
- El Dareer, Asma (1979). "Preliminary report on a study on prevalence and epidemiology of female circumcision in Sudan today", presented at WHO seminar on "Traditional Practices Affecting the Health of Women and Children", Khartoum, 10–15 February 1979.
- El Dareer, Asma (1979). "Female circumcision and its consequences for mother and child", presented at African symposium on "The World of Work and the Protection of the Child", Yaoundé, 12–15 December 1979. ISBN 978-9290141709
- El Dareer, Asma (1982). Woman, Why Do You Weep: Circumcision and its Consequences. London: Zed Books. ISBN 978-0862320997.
- El Dareer, Asma (January 1983). "Epidemiology of Female Circumcision in the Sudan". Tropical Doctor. 13 (1): 41–45. doi:10.1177/004947558301300114. PMID 6836733.
- El Dareer, Asma (June 1983). "Attitudes of Sudanese people to the practice of female circumcision". International Journal of Epidemiology. 12 (2): 138–144. doi:10.1093/ije/12.2.138. PMID 6874206.
- El Dareer, Asma (July 1983). "Complications of female circumcision in the Sudan". Tropical Doctor. 13 (3): 131–133. doi:10.1177/004947558301300313. PMID 6879696. S2CID 31003497.
- Rushwan, Hamid; Corry, J. M.; El Dareer, Asma; Bushra, Nadia (1983). Female Circumcision in the Sudan: Prevalence, Complications, Attitudes and Change. Khartoum: Faculty of Medicine, University of Khartoum. OCLC 1050045198.

== Works cited ==
- El Dareer, Asma (1982). Woman, Why Do You Weep: Circumcision and its Consequences. London: Zed Books. ISBN 0-86232-099-2.
- Barnes-Dean, Virginia Lee (June 1985). "Clitoridectomy and Infibulation". Cultural Survival Quarterly.
- Forbes, L. E. (February 1997). "Lilian Passmore Sanderson, 1925–1996" (PDF). Sudan Studies (19): 1–3. ISSN 0952-049X. Archived (PDF) from the original on 27 August 2019.
- Shell-Duncan, Bettina; Hernlund, Ylva (2000). "Female 'Circumcision' in Africa: Dimensions of the Practice and Debates". In Shell-Duncan, Bettina; Hernlund, Ylva (eds.). Female 'Circumcision' in Africa: Culture Controversy and Change. Boulder: Lynne Rienner Publishers. pp. 1–40.
- Zabus, Chantal (2004). "Between Rites and Rights: Excision on Trial in African Women's Texts and Human Contexts". In Marsden, Peter; Davis, Geoffrey V. (eds.). Towards a Transcultural Future: Literature and Human Rights in a 'post'-colonial World. Amsterdam and New York: Rodopi. pp. 109–134.
