= Dār Fertit =

Dār Fertit (also spelled Dar Fartit) is a historical term for the lowlands south of Darfur (Dar Fur) and east of the highlands in the east of the modern-day Central African Republic that contain tributaries of the White Nile River. This region included parts of southwestern Sudan and northwestern South Sudan. In the present era, Fertit is a catch-all word for non-Dinka, non-Arab, non-Luo, non-Fur groups and tribes in Western Bahr el Ghazal, South Sudan. Even though these groups often speak different languages and have a history of inter-tribal violence, they have become more unified over time, mostly out of opposition to the Dinka people.

Historically and down to the present, the region has been home to many ethnic groups and languages, some going back before 1800, others having migrated there since then. Dar Fertit has never been a united polity. Until the 1840s it, along with the rest of modern-day South Sudan, was unclaimed by any state, in particular the Muslim sultanates with slave-based economies that filled modern day southern Chad and the northern Central African Republic (among them Dar Fur, Dar Runga, Waddai, Dar al-Kuti, etc.). After that time, Egypt, then a domain of the Ottoman Empire, steadily expanded up the White Nile and then westwards, eventually annexing the region in 1873.

Today's Dar Fertit consists mostly of the western part of Raga County (pronounced 'raja') in Western Bahr el Ghazal. The Fertit also live in the northwestern part of Western Equatoria and in the northwesternmost corner of Northern Bahr el Ghazal.

== History ==
The region, and adjacent regions at the same latitudes, have an inhospitable terrain which becomes impassable during the wet season. From the 1700s on, Dar Fur and other Muslim sultanates would raid this region for slaves or would levy slaves from the communities there. The name "Fertit", whose etymology has been lost to history, came to be applied to the populations living south of Dar Fur, and it signified non-Muslims, people who were legally enslavable. Throughout the 1800s, individuals and peoples from the west and north fled to "Dar Fertit" seeking escape from slave raids.

As Egypt expanded into what is now South Sudan, it granted concessions to private merchants for gathering ivory and slaves. These merchants operated out of forts they constructed, called zaribas. For a time in the mid-1800s, one of these merchant warlords, al-Zubayr, conquered Dar Fertit and made it his personal domain. His zariba, Deim Zubeir (Zubayr's Camp), was the nucleus of the modern town of the same name.
