= Digraph =

Digraph, often misspelled as diagraph, may refer to:

- Digraph (orthography), a pair of characters used together to represent a single sound, such as "ch" in English
- Ligature (writing), the joining of two letters as a single glyph, such as "æ"
- Digraph (computing), a group of two characters in computer source code to be treated as a single character
- A directed graph, in graph theory
- Digraph, a component of a CIA cryptonym, a covert code name
- Digraph, a two-letter ISO 639-1 language code

== See also ==
- Digraphia, use of multiple complete writing systems for one language.
- Digram (disambiguation) / Digramme
- Bigram
- Trigraph (disambiguation)
- Multigraph (disambiguation)
- Unigraph
- wikt:Diagraph, a combination of a protractor and a scale ruler
