= Polygraph (disambiguation) =

A polygraph is a forensic instrument.

Polygraph may also refer to:

- Polygraph (author), an author who can write on a variety of different subjects
- Polygraph (duplicating device), a dual pen device that produces a simultaneous copy of an original while it is written in cursive writing
- Polygraph (film), a 1996 Canadian film
- Polygraph (mathematics), a mathematical generalisation of a directed graph in mathematics, also called a computad
- Autopen, an automatic signing instrument
- A painted reproduction created by the Polygraphic Society in London in the 1700s, by a process also known as "pollaplasiasmos"
- A 1988 play at the Theatre of Canada by Robert Lepage
- Polygraph.info, a fact-checking service
- An alternative term for Multigraph (orthography)

== See also ==
- Polygraff
- Multigraph (disambiguation)
- Moscow State University of Printing Arts, which was previously called the "Moscow Polygraphic Institute"
- Folly Theatre, in the City of Westminster, an Inner London borough, which from 1855 to 1869 was called "Woodin's Polygraphic Hall".
- Polygraphic substitution, a method of producing a code
- The Royal Polygraphic Rooms were performance venues in The Strand in London
