= ISO 639 =

Standard for language representation

ISO 639 is a standard by the International Organization for Standardization (ISO) concerned with the representation of languages and language groups. It currently consists of four sets (1–3, 5) of code, named after each part which formerly described respective set (part 4 was guidelines without its own coding system); a part 6 was published but withdrawn. It was first approved in 1967 as a single-part ISO Recommendation, ISO/R 639, superseded in 2002 by part 1 of the new series, ISO 639-1, followed by additional parts. All existing parts of the series were consolidated into a single standard in 2023, largely based on the text of ISO 639-4.

== Use of ISO 639 codes ==
The language codes defined in the several sections of ISO 639 are used for bibliographic purposes and, in computing and internet environments, as a key element of locale data. The codes also find use in various applications, such as Wikipedia URLs for its different language editions.

== History ==
The early form of ISO's language coding system was manifested by ISO/R 639:1967 titled Symbols for Languages, Countries and Authorities, which aimed chiefly to regulate vocabularies signifying languages, countries, and standardization agencies of ISO member bodies. Its "language symbols" consisted of one- or two-letter variable-length identifiers in capitalized Latin alphabets, e.g. E or En for English; S, Sp, or Es for Spanish; and In for Indonesian. It was also allowed to use (the pre-1993 version of) UDC numeral auxiliaries to indicate languages.

List of language symbols in ISO/R 639:1967
Name (English)	1-letter	2-letter	UDC	(1988)	(Current Set 1)
Afrikaans	—	Af	=393.6	af	af
Arabic	—	Ar	=927	ar	ar
Bulgarian	—	Bg	=867	bg	bg
Chinese	C	Ch	=951	zh	zh
Czech	—	Cs	=850	cs	cs
German	D	De	=30	de	de
Danish	—	Da	=398	da	da
English	E	En	=20	en	en
Esperanto	—	Eo	=089.2	eo	eo
Spanish	S	Es Sp	=60	es	es
French	F	Fr	=40	fr	fr
Finnish	—	Fi	=945.41	fi	fi
Greek	G	Gr	=75	el	el
Hebrew	—	He	=924	iw	he
Hindi	—	Hi	=914.3	hi	hi
Hungarian	—	Hu	=945.11	hu	hu
Italian	I	It	=50	it	it
Interlingua	—	Ia	=089.7	ia	ia
Interlingue	—	Ie	=089.6	ie	ie
Indonesian	—	In	=992.21	in	id
Japanese	J	Ja	=956	ja	ja
Korean	—	Ko	=957	ko	ko
Latin	L	La	=71	la	la
Dutch	—	Nl	=393.1	nl	nl
Norwegian	—	No	=396	no	no
Polish	—	Pl	=84	pl	pl
Portuguese	—	Pt	=690	pt	pt
Russian	R	Ru	=82	ru	ru
Romanian	—	Ro	=590	ro	ro
Sanskrit	—	Sa	=912.3	sa	sa
Serbo-Croat	—	Sh	=861/862	sh	—
Slovak	—	Sk	=854	sk	sk
Slovenian	—	Sn	=863	sl	sl
Swedish	—	Sv	=397	sv	sv
Turkish	—	Tr	=943.5	tr	tr
Ukrainian	—	Uk	=83	uk	uk
Urdu	—	Ur	=914.31	ur	ur

After decoupling the country code into ISO 3166 in 1974, the first edition of the standard ISO 639:1988 Code for the representation of names of languages was published with a framework of uniformly two-letter identifiers in lowercase Latin alphabets, mostly identical in format and vocabulary to that of the current ISO 639 Set 1.

Since then, the standard has been adopted as a fundamental technology of the rapidly expanding computer industry (RFC 1766), leading to development of more expressive three-letter framework, published as ISO 639-2:1998, largely based on MARC codes for languages. The original two-letter system was redefined as ISO 639-1 in 2001.

Seeking for more extensive support of languages for widening applications, separate supersets of the ISO 639-2 namespace that cover individual languages and groups were established as ISO 639-3 and ISO 639-5, respectively. There was also an attempt to code more precise language variants using four-letter identifiers as ISO 639-6, which was later withdrawn and to be reorganized under another framework, ISO 21636.

Relatively constant updates in parts of ISO 639 had been handled by each own authority in charge until the publication of ISO 639:2023, which harmonized and reunified the body text of former standards and brought about organizational change with a joint maintenance agency supervising all sets and issuing newsletters. The maintenance agency is located in Norway.

== Current sets and historical parts of the standard ==
Set (past Part)	Former name (Codes for the representation of names of languages – ...)	Language Coding Agency (formerly registration authority)	First edition	Current	No. in list (as of 12 July 2023)
Set 1	Part 1: Alpha-2 code	Infoterm	1967 (original ISO/R 639)	2023	183
Set 2	Part 2: Alpha-3 code	Library of Congress	1998	2023	482 + 20 B-only + 4 special + 520 for local use
Set 3	Part 3: Alpha-3 code for comprehensive coverage of languages	SIL International	2007	2023	7,916 + 4 special + 520 for local use
(ISO 639-4)	Part 4: Implementation guidelines and general principles for language coding	ISO/TC 37/SC 2	2010-07-16	2023	(not a list)
Set 5	Part 5: Alpha-3 code for language families and groups	Library of Congress	2008-05-15	2023	115 (including 36 remainder + 29 regular groups from ISO 639-2)
(ISO 639-6)	Part 6: Alpha-4 representation for comprehensive coverage of language variants (withdrawn)	Geolang	2009-11-17	withdrawn	21,000+

Each set of the standard is maintained by a language coding agency, which adds codes and changes the status of codes when needed. ISO 639-6 was withdrawn in 2014, and not included in ISO 639:2023.

== Characteristics of individual codes ==
Scopes:

- Individual languages
- Macrolanguages (Set 3)
- Collections of languages (Sets 2, 5). Some collections were already in Set 2, and others were added only in Set 5:
  - Remainder groups: 36 collections in both Set 2 and 5 are of this kind — for compatibility with Set 2 when Set 5 was still not published, the remainder groups do not contain any language and collection that was already coded in Set 2 (however new applications compatible with Set 5 may treat these groups inclusively, as long they respect the containment hierarchy published in Set 5 and they use the most specific collection when grouping languages);
    - The only collection which previously assigned with two-alphabet code is Bihari (bh) during the Part 1 era, which deprecated in June 2021.
  - Regular groups: 29 collections in both Sets 2 and 5 are of this kind — for compatibility with Set 2, they can not contain other groups;
  - Families: 50 new collections coded only in Set 5 (including one containing a regular group already coded in Set 2) — for compatibility with Set 2, they may contain other collections except remainder groups.
- Dialects: they were intended to be covered by former ISO 639-6 (proposed but now withdrawn).
- Special situations (Sets 2, 3).
- Reserved for local use (Sets 2, 3). Also used sometimes in applications needing a two-letter code like standard codes in Sets 1 and 2 (where the special code mis is not suitable), or a three-letter code for collections like standard codes in Set 5.

Types (for individual languages):

- Living languages (Sets 2, 3) (except Sanskrit, all other macrolanguages are living languages)
- Extinct languages (Sets 2, 3) (599, 5 of them are in Set 2: chb, chg, cop, lui, sam; none are in Set 1)
- Historical languages (Sets 1, 2, 3) (213, 35 of them are in Set 2; and 5 of them, namely ave, chu, lat, pli and san, also have a code in Set 1: ae, cu, la, pi, sa)
  - 124 of those were categorised as Ancient languages, this type has merged into Historical since about 2024
- Constructed languages (Sets 1, 2, 3) (23, 9 of them in Set 2: afh, epo, ido, ile, ina, jbo, tlh, vol, zbl; 5 of them in Set 1: eo, ia, ie, io, vo)

Individual languages and macrolanguages with two distinct three-letter codes in Set 2:

- Bibliographic (some of them were deprecated, none were defined in Set 3): these are legacy codes (based on language names in English).
- Terminologic (also defined in Set 3): these are the preferred codes (based on native language names, romanized if needed).
- All others (including collections of languages and special/reserved codes) only have a single three-letter code for both uses.

== Relations between the sets ==
The different sets of ISO 639 are designed to work together, in such a way that no code means one thing in one set and something else in another. However, not all languages are in all sets, and there is a variety of different ways that specific languages and other elements are treated in the different sets. This depends, for example, whether a language is listed in Sets 1 or 2, whether it has separate B/T codes in Set 2, or is classified as a macrolanguage in Set 3, and so forth.

These various treatments are detailed in the following chart. In each group of rows (one for each scope of Set 3), the last four columns contain codes for a representative language that exemplifies a specific type of relation between the sets of ISO 639, the second column provides an explanation of the relationship, and the first column indicates the number of elements that have that type of relationship. For example, there are four elements that have a code in Set 1, have a B/T code, and are classified as macrolanguages in Set 3. One representative of these four elements is "Persian" fa/per/fas.

Scope	Number of cases	Description	Example of matching codes			
Scope	Number of cases	Description	ISO 639 Set 1	ISO 639 Set 2	ISO 639 Set 3	ISO 639 Set 5
Individual languages ("I")	128	Individual languages not part of a macrolanguage, with code in each Set 1, 2 and 3 (only one code in Set 2). There are 184 assigned codes in Set 1 for individual languages, macrolanguages or groups; subtract those counted in rows below, this leaves: 184 - (2 I_{former B/T}) ‒ (3+11 I) ‒ (3+2 I_{B/T}) ‒ (28+4+1+1 M) ‒ (1 C) = 128 codes.	en	eng		—
Individual languages ("I")	2	Individual languages, with code in each Set 1, 2 and 3, that had separate B/T codes in Set 2, but whose B codes were withdrawn (since 2008-06-28) keeping their T codes for all uses. These are: hr/(scr)/hrv, and sr/(scc)/srp. Both are part of the same macrolanguage hbs added in Set 3 to include also other newly encoded individual languages, but its code sh in Set 1 was also withdrawn and it had no code defined in Set 2.	hr	(scr)/hrv (B/T)	hrv	—
Individual languages ("I")	3	Individual languages belonging to a macrolanguage in Set 3, with a single code in Set 2 and also having a code in Set 1. These are: bs/bos (part of macrolanguage hbs), nb/nob and nn/nno (both part of macrolanguage no/nor).	nb	nob		—
Individual languages ("I")	11	Individual languages with separate B/T codes in Set 2, but not in any of the special cases in succeeding lines. There are 20 pairs of separate B/T codes assigned in Set 2 to individual languages or macrolanguages; subtract the special cases below, this leaves: 20 ‒ (3+2 M) ‒ (4 C) = 11 pairs of codes.	de	ger/deu (B/T)	deu	—
Individual languages ("I")	3	Individual languages with separate B/T codes in Set 2 but the letters from the Set 1 code are not the first two letters of the Set 2T code. These are: cs/cze/ces, mi/mao/mri, and sk/slo/slk.	cs	cze/ces (B/T)	ces	—
Individual languages ("I")	3	Individual languages in Sets 2 and 3 (do not belong to a macrolanguage), but that were covered in Set 1 by a code whose equivalent in Set 2 is a collective. These are: bho, mai, and mag.	(bh)	bho		—
Individual languages ("I")	few	Any other individual language in Sets 2 and 3, without code in Set 1.	—	ast		—
Individual languages ("I")	1	Individual languages added in Set 3 without codes in Sets 1 and 2, but that were covered by a macrolanguage in Sets 2 and 3 also encoded in Set 1.	(ar)	(ara)	arb	—
Individual languages ("I")	1	An individual language in Set 3, without code in Set 2, but was covered in Set 1 by a code whose equivalent in Set 2 is a collective group (see the entry below for this group).	(bh)	(bih)	sck	—
Individual languages ("I")	> 7,000	Any other individual language in Set 3 without any code in Sets 1 and 2 (possibly covered in Set 2 by a collective code, like nic "Niger-Kodofanian (Other)" which is a remainder group).	—	(nic)	aaa	—
Macrolanguages ("M")	28	Macrolanguages in Set 3 that also have codes in Set 1 and 2. There are 62 codes assigned in Set 3 for macrolanguages; subtract those with special cases below, this leaves: 62 ‒ (4 "B/T") ‒ 1 ‒ (25+1+3 "not in Set 1") = 28 codes.	ar	ara		—
Macrolanguages ("M")	4	Macrolanguages in Set 3 with separate B/T codes in Set 2. These are: fa/per/fas, ms/may/msa, sq/alb/sqi, and zh/chi/zho.	fa	per/fas (B/T)	fas	—
Macrolanguages ("M")	1	Macrolanguage in Set 3 which contain languages that have codes in Set 1. Only: no/nor (containing: nb/nob, and nn/nno).	no	nor		—
Macrolanguages ("M")	25	Macrolanguages in Sets 2 and 3, but without code in Set 1.	—	bal		—
Macrolanguages ("M")	1	Macrolanguage in Set 3, without code in Set 2, and whose code in Set 1 is deprecated.	(sh)	—	hbs	—
Macrolanguages ("M")	3	Macrolanguages in Set 3, without codes in Set 1 or 2. These are: bnc, kln, and luy.	—	—	bnc	—
Families and groups (collective) ("C")	1	Bihari is marked as collective and has a Set 2 code. It was having a Set 1 code but deprecated in 2021. The reason was that three individual Bihari languages (which are different enough that they can not form the same macrolanguage for Set 3) received distinctive Set 2 codes (bho, mai, mag), which made Bihari a remainder group for the purposes of Set 2 (containing languages of the group except these three).	(bh)	bih	—	bih
Families and groups (collective) ("C")	35	Remainder groups in Set 2, i.e. same code but different languages included. In Set 2, afa refers to an Afro-Asiatic language that does not have an individual-language identifier in Set 2, and that does not fall into the three remainder groups: ber "Berber (Other)", cus "Cushitic (Other)", or sem "Semitic (Other)", all of which are Afro-Asiatic language groups.	—	afa	—	afa
Families and groups (collective) ("C")	29	Regular group in Set 2, same as the language family in Set 5, no code in Set 1. Among them, the regular group ypk in Set 2 was the only one to have been encoded in Set 5 as part of another new regular group in Set 5 that was not coded in Set 2 (see below).	—	aus	—	aus
Families and groups (collective) ("C")	50	Regular groups added only in Set 5, not previously coded in Sets 1, 2 and 3. Most of these new regular groups may have been previously represented by another collective code in Set 2 as part of a remainder group (for example the remainder group ine for the new regular group sqj), except 7 of them: aav, esx, euq, hmx, jpx, urj, as well as syd (part of the new regular group urj). The regular group ypk (part of the new regular group esx) however was already coded in Set 2. See the hierarchy of language groups in List of ISO 639 Set 5 codes.	—	—	—	sqj
Special codes ("S")	1	Available to be used in a monolingual context where an individual language code is required, but the language itself has no standard code. A more precise alternative could be using a remainder group from Set 2 or a language family code from Set 5, unless other languages in such group must be excluded (as they are separated with their own code) or no standard collective code is suitable. Some applications may prefer using a more specific code within those reserved for local use.	—	mis		—
Special codes ("S")	1	Multilingual content (includes at least two languages in separatable sets). To be used when a single language code is expected for the whole content. The individual languages or macrolanguages for each part of the content may be possibly still unencoded (and representable as mis or more precisely with a collective code).	—	mul		—
Special codes ("S")	1	Undetermined (content includes zero, one or many languages, in arbitrary combination).	—	und		—
Special codes ("S")	1	No linguistic information at all (added 2006-01-11). The content (e.g. graphics, photos or audio/video records not including text in a human language, or technical metadata and most programming source code) is usable as is with any language and should not be translated (except for its description possibly associated in separate contents, or for non-essential fragments of the content).	—	zxx		—
Reserved for local use ("R")	20	Two-letter codes in Set 1, in range qa .. qt. These codes are not recommended, but left unassigned in Set 1.	qa	—		
Reserved for local use ("R")	520	Three-letter codes in Sets 2 and 3, in range qaa ... qtz. These codes may also be used for collective languages (or other special cases), but no standard language families and groups will be assigned with them in Set 5.	—	qaa		

These differences are due to the following factors.

In ISO 639 Set 2, two distinct codes were assigned to 22 individual languages, namely a bibliographic and a terminology code (B/T codes). B codes were included for historical reasons because previous widely used bibliographic systems used language codes based on the English name for the language. In contrast, the Set 1 codes were based on the native name for the language, and there was also a strong desire to have Set 2 codes (T codes) for these languages which were similar to the corresponding 2-character code in Set 1.

- For instance, the German language (Set 1: de) has two codes in Set 2: ger (B code) and deu (T code), whereas there is only one code in Set 2, eng, for the English language.
- 2 former B codes were withdrawn, leaving today only 20 pairs of B/T codes.

Individual languages in Set 2 always have a code in Set 3 (only the Set 2 terminology code is reused there) but may or may not have a code in Set 1, as illustrated by the following examples:

- Set 3 eng corresponds to Set 2 eng and Set 1 en
- Set 3 ast corresponds to Set 2 ast but lacks a code in Set 1.

Some codes (62) in Set 3 are macrolanguages. These are groups containing multiple individual languages that have a good mutual understanding and are commonly mixed or confused. Some macrolanguages developed a default standard form on one of their individual languages (e.g. Mandarin is implied by default for the Chinese macrolanguage, other individual languages may be still distinguished if needed but the specific code cmn for Mandarin is rarely used).

- 1 macrolanguage has a Set 2 code and a Set 1 code, while its member individual languages also have codes in Set 1 and Set 2: nor/no contains nno/nn, nob/nb; or
- 4 macrolanguages have two Set 2 codes (B/T) and a Set 1 code: per/fas/fa, may/msa/ms, alb/sqi/sq, and chi/zho/zh;
- 28 macrolanguages have a Set 2 code but no Set 1 code;
- 29 other macrolanguages only have codes in Set 3.

Collective codes in Set 2 have a code in Set 5: e.g. aus in Sets 2 and 5, which stands for Australian languages.

- Some codes were added in Set 5 but had no code in Set 2: e.g. sqj

Sets 2 and 3 also have a reserved range and four special codes:

- Codes qaa through qtz are reserved for local use.
- There are four special codes: mis for languages that have no code yet assigned, mul for "multiple languages", und for "undefined", and zxx for "no linguistic content, not applicable".

== Code space ==
=== Two-letter code space ===
Two-letter (formerly "Alpha-2") identifiers (for codes composed of 2 letters of the ISO basic Latin alphabet) are used in Set 1. When codes for a wider range of languages were desired, more than 2 letter combinations could cover (a maximum of 26^{2} = 676), Set 2 was developed using three-letter codes. (However, the latter was formally published first.)

=== Three-letter code space ===
Three-letter (formerly "Alpha-3") identifiers (for codes composed of 3 letters of the ISO basic Latin alphabet) are used in Set 2, Set 3, and Set 5. The number of languages and language groups that can be so represented is 26^{3} = 17,576.

The common use of three-letter codes by three sets of ISO 639 requires some coordination within a larger system.

Set 2 defines four special codes mis, mul, und, zxx, a reserved range qaa-qtz (20 × 26 = 520 codes) and has 20 double entries (the B/T codes), plus 2 entries with deprecated B-codes. This sums up to 520 + 22 + 4 = 546 codes that cannot be used in Set 3 to represent languages or in Set 5 to represent language families or groups. The remainder is 17,576 – 546 = 17,030.

There are somewhere around six to seven thousand languages on Earth today. So those 17,030 codes are adequate to assign a unique code to each language, although some languages may end up with arbitrary codes that sound nothing like the traditional name(s) of that language.

=== Alpha-4 code space (withdrawn) ===
"Alpha-4" codes (for codes composed of 4 letters of the ISO basic Latin alphabet) were proposed to be used in ISO 639-6, which has been withdrawn. The upper limit for the number of languages and dialects that can be represented is 26^{4} = 456,976.

== See also ==
- IETF language tags (based on ISO 639)
- ISO 3166 (codes for countries)
- ISO 15924 (codes for writing systems)
- Codes for constructed languages
- Language code
- Language families and languages
- List of languages
- List of official languages
- Lists of ISO 639 codes
