= Lists of ISO 639 codes =

Further

ISO 639 is a set of standards by the International Organization for Standardization that is concerned with representation of names for languages and language groups. Lists of ISO 639 codes are:

- List of ISO 639-1 codes, with corresponding ISO 639-2 and ISO 639-3 codes
- List of ISO 639-2 codes, with corresponding ISO 639-1 codes
- List of ISO 639-3 codes, with corresponding ISO 639-1 and ISO 639-2 codes
- List of ISO 639-3 macrolanguages, with corresponding ISO 639-1 and ISO 639-2 codes
- List of ISO 639-5 codes, with markers for corresponding ISO 639-2 codes
