= Trigraph =

Trigraph may refer to:

- Trigraph (orthography), a combination of written letters used to represent a sound

== Computing ==
- Digraphs and trigraphs (programming), a group of characters used to symbolise one character
- An octal or decimal representation of byte values
- Mnemonics for machine language instructions
- As language codes in ISO 639

== Cryptography ==
- As substitution group in a substitution cipher
- As combinations in the Ling Qi Jing

== Mathematics ==
- As a generalization of graphs where there is a set of edges called semi-adjacent

== See also ==
- Digraph (disambiguation)
- Tetragraph
- Multigraph (disambiguation)
