= Digraphs and trigraphs =

Digraphs and trigraphs may refer to:

- Digraphs and trigraphs (programming), sequences of two or three letters that are treated by programming languages as single characters
- Multigraph (orthography), a sequence of letters that behaves as a unit and is not the sum of its parts

== See also ==
- Multigraph (disambiguation)
