= Trigram (disambiguation) =

In the fields of computational linguistics and probability, Trigrams, are a special case of the n-gram, where n is 3.

Trigram may also refer to:

- Bagua (called Eight Trigrams in English), a set of eight symbols in Taoist cosmology
- A three-letter acronym
  - Trigram (FIFA), three letter codes used by the football association FIFA

== See also ==
- Trigram search
- Digram (disambiguation)
- Trigraph (disambiguation)
