= List of ISO 639 language codes =

Codes used to classify languages

ISO 639 is a standardized nomenclature used to classify languages. Each language is assigned a two-letter (set 1) and three-letter lowercase abbreviation (sets 2–5). Part 1 of the standard, ISO 639-1, defines the two-letter codes, and Part 3 (2007), ISO 639-3, defines the three-letter codes, aiming to cover all known natural languages, largely superseding the ISO 639-2 three-letter code standard.

== Table ==
This table lists all two-letter codes (set 1), one per language for ISO 639 macrolanguage, and some of the three-letter codes of the other sets, formerly parts 2 and 3.

Entries in the Scope column distinguish:

- Individual language
- Macrolanguages

The Type column distinguishes:

- Living languages
- Historical languages
- Constructed languages (with indications on their original authors)

ISO language names	Set 1	Set 2		Set 3	Scope	Type	Endonym(s)	Other name(s) (Note: For reference only; alternate names are not included in the ISO standard.)	Notes
ISO language names	Set 1	T	B	Set 3	Scope	Type	Endonym(s)	Other name(s)	Notes
Abkhazian	ab	abk		abk	Individual	Living	Аҧсуа; Apsua; აფსუა	Abkhaz	
Afar	aa	aar		aar	Individual	Living	Qafar af		
Afrikaans	af	afr		afr	Individual	Living	Afrikaans		
Akan	ak	aka		aka + 2	Macrolanguage	Living	Ákán		Twi is tw/twi, Fanti is fat
Albanian	sq	sqi	alb	sqi + 4	Macrolanguage	Living	Shqip	called "Albanian Phylozone" in 639-6	
Amharic	am	amh		amh	Individual	Living	አማርኛ (Amarəñña)		
Arabic	ar	ara		ara + 28	Macrolanguage	Living	اَلْعَرَبِيَّةُ (al-ʿarabiyyah)		Standard Arabic is arb
Aragonese	an	arg		arg	Individual	Living	Aragonés		
Armenian	hy	hye	arm	hye	Individual	Living	Հայերեն (Hayeren)		ISO 639-3 code hye is for Eastern Armenian, hyw is for Western Armenian, and xcl is for Classical Armenian
Assamese	as	asm		asm	Individual	Living	অসমীয়া (Ôxômiya)	Asamiya	
Avaric	av	ava		ava	Individual	Living	Авар мацӏ; اوار ماض (Avar maz)	Avar	
Avestan	ae	ave		ave	Individual	Historical	Upastawakaēna		
Aymara	ay	aym		aym + 2	Macrolanguage	Living	Aymara	Aymaran	
Azerbaijani	az	aze		aze + 2	Macrolanguage	Living	Azərbaycan dili; آذربایجان دیلی; Азәрбајҹан дили	Azeri	
Bambara	bm	bam		bam	Individual	Living	بَمَنَنكَن;ߓߡߊߣߊ߲ߞߊ߲ (Bamanankan)	Bamana; Bamanankan	
Bashkir	ba	bak		bak	Individual	Living	Башҡорт теле; Başqort tele	Bashkort	
Basque	eu	eus	baq	eus	Individual	Living	Euskara/Euskera		
Belarusian	be	bel		bel	Individual	Living	Беларуская мова (Biełaruskaja mova)		
Bengali	bn	ben		ben	Individual	Living	বাংলা (Bāŋlā)	Bangla	
Bislama	bi	bis		bis	Individual	Living	Bislama		Language formed from English and Vanuatuan languages, with some French influence.
Bosnian	bs	bos		bos	Individual	Living	Босански (Bosanski)	Bosniak	Member language of Serbo-Croatian with code sh deprecated in 2000
Breton	br	bre		bre	Individual	Living	Brezhoneg		
Bulgarian	bg	bul		bul	Individual	Living	Български (Bulgarski)		
Burmese	my	mya	bur	mya	Individual	Living	မြန်မာစာ (Mrãmācā)	Myanmar	
Catalan, Valencian	ca	cat		cat	Individual	Living	Català; Valencià		
Chamorro	ch	cha		cha	Individual	Living	Finu' Chamoru		
Chechen	ce	che		che	Individual	Living	Нохчийн мотт; (Noxçiyn mott)	Chechnyan; Chechnian	
Chichewa, Chewa, Nyanja	ny	nya		nya	Individual	Living	Chichewa; Chinyanja		
Chinese	zh	zho	chi	zho + 19	Macrolanguage	Living	中文 (Zhōngwén), 汉语; 漢語 (Hànyǔ)		
Church Slavonic, Old Slavonic, Old Church Slavonic	cu	chu		chu	Individual	Historical	Славе́нскїй ѧ҆зы́къ		In use by the Eastern Orthodox Church
Chuvash	cv	chv		chv	Individual	Living	Чӑвашла (Çăvaşla)		
Cornish	kw	cor		cor	Individual	Living	Kernowek		
Corsican	co	cos		cos	Individual	Living	Corsu		
Cree	cr	cre		cre + 6	Macrolanguage	Living	ᓀᐦᐃᔭᐁᐧᐃᐧᐣ (Nehiyawewin)		
Croatian	hr	hrv		hrv	Individual	Living	Hrvatski		Member language of Serbo-Croatian with code sh deprecated in 2000
Czech	cs	ces	cze	ces	Individual	Living	Čeština	Bohemian; Czechian	
Danish	da	dan		dan	Individual	Living	Dansk		
Divehi, Dhivehi, Maldivian	dv	div		div	Individual	Living	ދިވެހި (Dhivehi)		
Dutch, Flemish	nl	nld	dut	nld	Individual	Living	Nederlands		Flemish is not to be confused with the closely related West Flemish, which is referred to as "Vlaams" and has the code vls in ISO 639-3.
Dzongkha	dz	dzo		dzo	Individual	Living	རྫོང་ཁ་ (Dzongkha)	Bhutanese	
English	en	eng		eng	Individual	Living	English		
Esperanto	eo	epo		epo	Individual	Constructed	Esperanto		
Estonian	et	est		est + 2	Macrolanguage	Living	Eesti keel		
Ewe	ee	ewe		ewe	Individual	Living	Èʋegbe		
Faroese	fo	fao		fao	Individual	Living	Føroyskt	Faeroese	
Fijian	fj	fij		fij	Individual	Living	Na Vosa Vakaviti		
Finnish	fi	fin		fin	Individual	Living	Suomi		
French	fr	fra	fre	fra	Individual	Living	Français		
Western Frisian	fy	fry		fry	Individual	Living	Frysk	West Frisian; Frisian; Fries	
Fulah	ff	ful		ful + 9	Macrolanguage	Living	𞤊𞤵𞤤𞤬𞤵𞤤𞤣𞤫 ;ࢻُلْࢻُلْدٜ; Fulfulde, 𞤆𞤵𞤤𞤢𞥄𞤪 ;ݒُلَارْ; Pulaar	Fula; Fulani	
Gaelic, Scottish Gaelic	gd	gla		gla	Individual	Living	Gàidhlig	Scots Gaelic	
Galician	gl	glg		glg	Individual	Living	Galego	Galego	
Ganda	lg	lug		lug	Individual	Living	Luganda	Luganda	
Georgian	ka	kat	geo	kat	Individual	Living	ქართული (k'art'uli)		
German	de	deu	ger	deu	Individual	Living	Deutsch		
Greek, Modern (1453–)	el	ell	gre	ell	Individual	Living	Νέα Ελληνικά; (Néa Ellêniká)		For Ancient Greek, use the ISO 639-3 code grc.
Kalaallisut, Greenlandic	kl	kal		kal	Individual	Living	Kalaallisut		
Guarani	gn	grn		grn + 5	Macrolanguage	Living	Avañe'ẽ		
Gujarati	gu	guj		guj	Individual	Living	ગુજરાતી (Gujarātī)		
Haitian, Haitian Creole	ht	hat		hat	Individual	Living	Kreyòl ayisyen		
Hausa	ha	hau		hau	Individual	Living	هَرْشٜن هَوْس (halshen Hausa)	Hausan	
Hebrew	he	heb		heb	Individual	Living	עברית (Ivrit)		Modern Hebrew. Code changed in 1989 from original ISO 639:1988, iw.
Herero	hz	her		her	Individual	Living	Otjiherero	Otjiherero	
Hindi	hi	hin		hin	Individual	Living	हिन्दी (Hindī)		
Hiri Motu	ho	hmo		hmo	Individual	Living	Hiri Motu	Police Motu; Pidgin Motu	
Hungarian	hu	hun		hun	Individual	Living	Magyar nyelv	Magyar	
Icelandic	is	isl	ice	isl	Individual	Living	Íslenska		
Ido	io	ido		ido	Individual	Constructed	Ido		
Igbo	ig	ibo		ibo	Individual	Living	ásụ̀sụ́ Ìgbò		
Indonesian	id	ind		ind	Individual	Living	Bahasa Indonesia		Covered by macrolanguage ms/msa. Changed in 1989 from original ISO 639:1988, in.
Interlingua (International Auxiliary Language Association)	ia	ina		ina	Individual	Constructed	Interlingua		
Interlingue, Occidental	ie	ile		ile	Individual	Constructed	Interlingue; Occidental		
Inuktitut	iu	iku		iku + 2	Macrolanguage	Living	ᐃᓄᒃᑎᑐᑦ (Inuktitut)		
Inupiaq	ik	ipk		ipk + 2	Macrolanguage	Living	Iñupiaq	Inupiat; Inupiatun	
Irish	ga	gle		gle	Individual	Living	Gaeilge	Irish Gaelic	
Italian	it	ita		ita	Individual	Living	Italiano		
Japanese	ja	jpn		jpn	Individual	Living	日本語 (Nihongo)		
Javanese	jv	jav		jav	Individual	Living	ꦧꦱꦗꦮ; basa Jawa		
Kannada	kn	kan		kan	Individual	Living	ಕನ್ನಡ (Kannađa)	Kannadan; Canarese	
Kanuri	kr	kau		kau + 3	Macrolanguage	Living	كَنُرِيِه; Kànùrí		
Kashmiri	ks	kas		kas	Individual	Living	कॉशुर; كأشُر (Kosher)	Koshur	
Kazakh	kk	kaz		kaz	Individual	Living	Қазақша; Qazaqşa; قازاقشا	Qazaq	
Central Khmer	km	khm		khm	Individual	Living	ខេមរភាសា; (Khémôrôphéasa)	Khmer; Cambodian	
Kikuyu, Gikuyu	ki	kik		kik	Individual	Living	Gĩgĩkũyũ		
Kinyarwanda	rw	kin		kin	Individual	Living	Ikinyarwanda	Rwandan; Rwanda; Ikinyarwanda	
Kyrgyz, Kirghiz	ky	kir		kir	Individual	Living	Кыргыз; قىرعىز		
Komi	kv	kom		kom + 2	Macrolanguage	Living	Коми кыв	Zyran; Zyrian; Komi-Zyryan	
Kongo	kg	kon		kon + 3	Macrolanguage	Living	Kikongo	Kikongo	
Korean	ko	kor		kor	Individual	Living	한국어 (Hangugeo), 조선말 (Chosŏnmal)		
Kuanyama, Kwanyama	kj	kua		kua	Individual	Living	Oshikwanyama	Cuanhama; Oshikwanyama	
Kurdish	ku	kur		kur + 3	Macrolanguage	Living	کوردی; Kurdî		
Lao	lo	lao		lao	Individual	Living	ພາສາລາວ (phasa Lao)	Laotian	
Latin	la	lat		lat	Individual	Historical	Latinum		In use by several Christian organization of churches, and for sciences
Latvian	lv	lav		lav + 2	Macrolanguage	Living	Latviešu	Lettish	
Limburgan, Limburger, Limburgish	li	lim		lim	Individual	Living	Limburgisch		
Lingala	ln	lin		lin	Individual	Living	Lingála	Ngala	
Lithuanian	lt	lit		lit	Individual	Living	Lietuvių		
Luba-Katanga	lu	lub		lub	Individual	Living	Kiluba	Luba-Shaba	
Luxembourgish, Letzeburgesch	lb	ltz		ltz	Individual	Living	Lëtzebuergesch	Luxembourgian	
Macedonian	mk	mkd	mac	mkd	Individual	Living	Македонски (Makedonski)		
Malagasy	mg	mlg		mlg + 11	Macrolanguage	Living	مَلَغَسِ; Malagasy		
Malay	ms	msa	may	msa + 36	Macrolanguage	Living	بهاس ملايو (bahasa Melayu)		Standard Malay is zsm, Indonesian is id/ind.
Malayalam	ml	mal		mal	Individual	Living	മലയാളം (Malayāḷam)		
Maltese	mt	mlt		mlt	Individual	Living	Malti		
Manx	gv	glv		glv	Individual	Living	Gaelg; Gailck	Manx Gaelic	
Maori	mi	mri	mao	mri	Individual	Living	reo Māori		
Marathi	mr	mar		mar	Individual	Living	मराठी (Marāṭhī)	Maharashtran	
Marshallese	mh	mah		mah	Individual	Living	kajin M̧ajel‌̧	Ebon	
Mongolian	mn	mon		mon + 2	Macrolanguage	Living	ᠮᠣᠩᠭᠣᠯ ᠬᠡᠯᠡ; Монгол хэл (Mongol xel)	Mongol	
Nauru	na	nau		nau	Individual	Living	dorerin Naoe	Nauruan	
Navajo, Navaho	nv	nav		nav	Individual	Living	Diné bizaad; Naabeehó bizaad		
North Ndebele	nd	nde		nde	Individual	Living	isiNdebele; saseNyakatho; Mthwakazi Ndebele	Northern Ndebele	
South Ndebele	nr	nbl		nbl	Individual	Living	isiNdebele; sakwaNdzundza	Southern Ndebele	
Ndonga	ng	ndo		ndo	Individual	Living	Ndonga	Oshindonga	
Nepali	ne	nep		nep + 2	Macrolanguage	Living	नेपाली भाषा (Nepālī bhāśā)	Nepalese; Gorkhali	
Norwegian	no	nor		nor + 2	Macrolanguage	Living	Norsk		Bokmål is nb/nob, Nynorsk is nn/nno
Norwegian Bokmål	nb	nob		nob	Individual	Living	Norsk Bokmål		covered by macrolanguage no/nor
Norwegian Nynorsk	nn	nno		nno	Individual	Living	Norsk Nynorsk		covered by macrolanguage no/nor
Occitan	oc	oci		oci	Individual	Living	Occitan; Provençal	Provential; Provencal	
Ojibwa	oj	oji		oji + 7	Macrolanguage	Living	ᐊᓂᔑᓈᐯᒧᐎᓐ (Anishinaabemowin)	Ojibwe; Ojibway; Otchipwe; Ojibwemowin	
Oriya	or	ori		ori + 2	Macrolanguage	Living	ଓଡ଼ିଆ (Odia)	Odian; Odishan; Orissan	
Oromo	om	orm		orm + 4	Macrolanguage	Living	afaan Oromoo	Oromoo	
Ossetian, Ossetic	os	oss		oss	Individual	Living	ирон Ӕвзаг (iron Ævzag)	Ossete	This generally refers to Iron, one of the two main dialect of Ossetian, Digor, as another one, has separate set 3 code osd
Pali	pi	pli		pli	Individual	Historical	Pāli	Pali-Magadhi	
Pashto, Pushto	ps	pus		pus + 3	Macrolanguage	Living	پښتو (Pax̌tow)		
Persian	fa	fas	per	fas + 2	Macrolanguage	Living	فارسی (Fārsiy)	Farsi	
Polish	pl	pol		pol	Individual	Living	Polski		
Portuguese	pt	por		por	Individual	Living	Português		
Punjabi, Panjabi	pa	pan		pan	Individual	Living	ਪੰਜਾਬੀ; پنجابی (Pãjābī)		
Quechua	qu	que		que + 43	Macrolanguage	Living	Runa simi; kichwa simi; Nuna shimi	Quechuan	
Romanian, Moldavian, Moldovan	ro	ron	rum	ron	Individual	Living	Română; Ромынэ		the identifiers mo and mol for Moldavian are deprecated. They will not be assigned to different items, and recordings using these identifiers will not be invalid.
Romansh	rm	roh		roh	Individual	Living	Rumantsch; Rumàntsch; Romauntsch; Romontsch	Romansch	
Rundi	rn	run		run	Individual	Living	Ikirundi	Kirundi	
Russian	ru	rus		rus	Individual	Living	Русский язык (Russkiĭ âzyk)		
Northern Sami	se	sme		sme	Individual	Living	Davvisámegiella	North Sami	
Samoan	sm	smo		smo	Individual	Living	gagana Sāmoa		
Sango	sg	sag		sag	Individual	Living	yângâ tî Sängö	Sangoic	
Sanskrit	sa	san		san + 2	Macrolanguage	Historical	संस्कृतम् (Saṃskṛtam)		In use by some Indian states on judicial purposes
Sardinian	sc	srd		srd + 4	Macrolanguage	Living	Sardu	Sard	
Serbian	sr	srp		srp	Individual	Living	Српски (Srpski)		Member language of Serbo-Croatian with code sh deprecated in 2000, the ISO 639-2/T code srp deprecated the ISO 639-2/B code scc
Shona	sn	sna		sna	Individual	Living	chiShona		
Sindhi	sd	snd		snd	Individual	Living	سنڌي; सिन्धी (Sindhī)		
Sinhala, Sinhalese	si	sin		sin	Individual	Living	සිංහල (Siṁhala)		
Slovak	sk	slk	slo	slk	Individual	Living	Slovenčina	Slovakian	
Slovenian	sl	slv		slv	Individual	Living	Slovenščina	Slovene	
Somali	so	som		som	Individual	Living	Soomaali; 𐒈𐒝𐒑𐒛𐒐𐒘; سٝومالِ	Somalian	
Southern Sotho	st	sot		sot	Individual	Living	Sesotho	Sesotho; Sotho	
Spanish, Castilian	es	spa		spa	Individual	Living	Español; Castellano		
Sundanese	su	sun		sun	Individual	Living	basa Sunda; ᮘᮞ ᮞᮥᮔ᮪ᮓ; بَاسَا سُوْندَا		
Swahili	sw	swa		swa + 2	Macrolanguage	Living	Kiswahili; كِسوَحِيلِ	Kiswahili	
Swati	ss	ssw		ssw	Individual	Living	siSwati	Swazi	
Swedish	sv	swe		swe	Individual	Living	Svenska		
Tagalog	tl	tgl		tgl	Individual	Living	Wikang Tagalog		Filipino (Pilipino) has the code fil
Tahitian	ty	tah		tah	Individual	Living	reo Tahiti		One of the Reo Mā`ohi (languages of French Polynesia)
Tajik	tg	tgk		tgk	Individual	Living	Тоҷикӣ (Tojikī)	Tajiki	
Tamil	ta	tam		tam	Individual	Living	தமிழ் (Tamiḻ)	Thamizh	
Tatar	tt	tat		tat	Individual	Living	Татар теле; Tatar tele; تاتار تئلئ		
Telugu	te	tel		tel	Individual	Living	తెలుగు (Telugu)		
Thai	th	tha		tha	Individual	Living	ภาษาไทย (Phasa Thai)	Central Thai; Siamese	
Tibetan	bo	bod	tib	bod	Individual	Living	བོད་སྐད་ (Bodskad); ལྷ་སའི་སྐད་ (Lhas'iskad)	Standard Tibetan; Lhasa Tibetan	
Tigrinya	ti	tir		tir	Individual	Living	ትግርኛ (Təgrəñña)	Tigrigna	
Tonga (Tonga Islands)	to	ton		ton	Individual	Living	lea faka-Tonga	Tongan	
Tsonga	ts	tso		tso	Individual	Living	Xitsonga	Xitsonga	
Tswana	tn	tsn		tsn	Individual	Living	Setswana	Setswana; Sechuana	
Turkish	tr	tur		tur	Individual	Living	Türkçe		
Turkmen	tk	tuk		tuk	Individual	Living	Türkmençe; Түркменче; تۆرکمنچه		
Twi	tw	twi		twi	Individual	Living	Twi		covered by macrolanguage ak/aka
Uighur, Uyghur	ug	uig		uig	Individual	Living	ئۇيغۇر تىلى; Уйғур тили; Uyƣur tili		
Ukrainian	uk	ukr		ukr	Individual	Living	Українська (Ukraїnska)		
Urdu	ur	urd		urd	Individual	Living	اُردُو (Urdū)		
Uzbek	uz	uzb		uzb + 2	Macrolanguage	Living	Ózbekça; ўзбекча; ئوزبېچه		
Venda	ve	ven		ven	Individual	Living	Tshivenḓa	Tshivenda	
Vietnamese	vi	vie		vie	Individual	Living	tiếng Việt		
Volapük	vo	vol		vol	Individual	Constructed	Volapük		
Walloon	wa	wln		wln	Individual	Living	Walon		
Welsh	cy	cym	wel	cym	Individual	Living	Cymraeg		
Wolof	wo	wol		wol	Individual	Living	وࣷلࣷفْ		
Xhosa	xh	xho		xho	Individual	Living	isiXhosa	Xosa	
Sichuan Yi, Nuosu	ii	iii		iii	Individual	Living	ꆈꌠꉙ (Nuosuhxop)	Northern Yi; Liangshan Yi; Nosu	standard form of the Yi languages
Yiddish	yi	yid		yid + 2	Macrolanguage	Living	ייִדיש (Yidiš)	Judeo-German	Changed in 1989 from original ISO 639:1988, ji.
Yoruba	yo	yor		yor	Individual	Living	èdè Yorùbá		
Zhuang, Chuang	za	zha		zha + 16	Macrolanguage	Living	話僮 (Vahcuengh)		
Zulu	zu	zul		zul	Individual	Living	isiZulu		

== Table of all possible two-letter codes ==
Decoding table of ISO 639 alpha-2 codes (set 1)
aa	ab	ac	ad	ae	af	ag	ah	ai	aj	ak	al	am	an	ao	ap	aq	ar	as	at	au	av	aw	ax	ay	az
ba	bb	bc	bd	be	bf	bg	bh	bi	bj	bk	bl	bm	bn	bo	bp	bq	br	bs	bt	bu	bv	bw	bx	by	bz
ca	cb	cc	cd	ce	cf	cg	ch	ci	cj	ck	cl	cm	cn	co	cp	cq	cr	cs	ct	cu	cv	cw	cx	cy	cz
da	db	dc	dd	de	df	dg	dh	di	dj	dk	dl	dm	dn	do	dp	dq	dr	ds	dt	du	dv	dw	dx	dy	dz
ea	eb	ec	ed	ee	ef	eg	eh	ei	ej	ek	el	em	en	eo	ep	eq	er	es	et	eu	ev	ew	ex	ey	ez
fa	fb	fc	fd	fe	ff	fg	fh	fi	fj	fk	fl	fm	fn	fo	fp	fq	fr	fs	ft	fu	fv	fw	fx	fy	fz
ga	gb	gc	gd	ge	gf	gg	gh	gi	gj	gk	gl	gm	gn	go	gp	gq	gr	gs	gt	gu	gv	gw	gx	gy	gz
ha	hb	hc	hd	he	hf	hg	hh	hi	hj	hk	hl	hm	hn	ho	hp	hq	hr	hs	ht	hu	hv	hw	hx	hy	hz
ia	ib	ic	id	ie	if	ig	ih	ii	ij	ik	il	im	in	io	ip	iq	ir	is	it	iu	iv	iw	ix	iy	iz
ja	jb	jc	jd	je	jf	jg	jh	ji	jj	jk	jl	jm	jn	jo	jp	jq	jr	js	jt	ju	jv	jw	jx	jy	jz
ka	kb	kc	kd	ke	kf	kg	kh	ki	kj	kk	kl	km	kn	ko	kp	kq	kr	ks	kt	ku	kv	kw	kx	ky	kz
la	lb	lc	ld	le	lf	lg	lh	li	lj	lk	ll	lm	ln	lo	lp	lq	lr	ls	lt	lu	lv	lw	lx	ly	lz
ma	mb	mc	md	me	mf	mg	mh	mi	mj	mk	ml	mm	mn	mo	mp	mq	mr	ms	mt	mu	mv	mw	mx	my	mz
na	nb	nc	nd	ne	nf	ng	nh	ni	nj	nk	nl	nm	nn	no	np	nq	nr	ns	nt	nu	nv	nw	nx	ny	nz
oa	ob	oc	od	oe	of	og	oh	oi	oj	ok	ol	om	on	oo	op	oq	or	os	ot	ou	ov	ow	ox	oy	oz
pa	pb	pc	pd	pe	pf	pg	ph	pi	pj	pk	pl	pm	pn	po	pp	pq	pr	ps	pt	pu	pv	pw	px	py	pz
qa	qb	qc	qd	qe	qf	qg	qh	qi	qj	qk	ql	qm	qn	qo	qp	qq	qr	qs	qt	qu	qv	qw	qx	qy	qz
ra	rb	rc	rd	re	rf	rg	rh	ri	rj	rk	rl	rm	rn	ro	rp	rq	rr	rs	rt	ru	rv	rw	rx	ry	rz
sa	sb	sc	sd	se	sf	sg	sh	si	sj	sk	sl	sm	sn	so	sp	sq	sr	ss	st	su	sv	sw	sx	sy	sz
ta	tb	tc	td	te	tf	tg	th	ti	tj	tk	tl	tm	tn	to	tp	tq	tr	ts	tt	tu	tv	tw	tx	ty	tz
ua	ub	uc	ud	ue	uf	ug	uh	ui	uj	uk	ul	um	un	uo	up	uq	ur	us	ut	uu	uv	uw	ux	uy	uz
va	vb	vc	vd	ve	vf	vg	vh	vi	vj	vk	vl	vm	vn	vo	vp	vq	vr	vs	vt	vu	vv	vw	vx	vy	vz
wa	wb	wc	wd	we	wf	wg	wh	wi	wj	wk	wl	wm	wn	wo	wp	wq	wr	ws	wt	wu	wv	ww	wx	wy	wz
xa	xb	xc	xd	xe	xf	xg	xh	xi	xj	xk	xl	xm	xn	xo	xp	xq	xr	xs	xt	xu	xv	xw	xx	xy	xz
ya	yb	yc	yd	ye	yf	yg	yh	yi	yj	yk	yl	ym	yn	yo	yp	yq	yr	ys	yt	yu	yv	yw	yx	yy	yz
za	zb	zc	zd	ze	zf	zg	zh	zi	zj	zk	zl	zm	zn	zo	zp	zq	zr	zs	zt	zu	zv	zw	zx	zy	zz
Colour legend
183/676		Officially assigned: assigned to a language																							
7/676		Deprecated: used previously but no longer assigned																							
486/676		Unassigned																							
