= ISO 639-1 =

Standard codes for identifying languages

ISO 639-1:2002, Codes for the representation of names of languages—Part 1: Alpha-2 code, is the first part of the ISO 639 series of international standards for language codes. Part 1 covers the registration of "set 1" two-letter codes. There are 183 two-letter codes registered as of June 2021. The registered codes cover the world's major languages.

Infoterm (International Information Centre for Terminology) is the registration authority for ISO 639-1 codes.

These codes are a useful international and formal shorthand for indicating languages.

Examples of ISO 639-1 codes
Code	ISO 639-1 language name	Endonym
Code	English	Endonym
en	English	English
es	Spanish	español
pt	Portuguese	português
zh	Chinese	中文, Zhōngwén

ISO 639-1 is more restrictive than other ISO 639 parts, such as ISO 639-2 and ISO 639-3, which cover a wider range of languages and variations.

Many multilingual websites, including Wikipedia, use these codes to prefix URLs of localised versions: for example, ja.wikipedia.org is the Japanese version of Wikipedia.

== History ==
ISO 639, the original standard for language codes, was approved in 1967. It was designed to represent major and primary national languages with well-established terminologies and lexicography.

In 1998 the standard was extended with an additional part, ISO 639-2, providing three-letter codes for a much wider range of languages. The original standard was redesignated as ISO 639-1 in 2002, in an updated version. Eventually five parts were issued, each being maintained as a separate standard.

In 2023, the different parts were combined into a unified standard, with the different code lists from each part now designated "sets".

The last two-letter code added was ht, representing Haitian Creole on February 26, 2003.

== Updates ==
New ISO 639-1 codes are not added if an ISO 639-2 "set 2" three-letter code exists, so systems that use ISO 639-1 and 639-2 codes, with 639-1 codes preferred, do not have to change existing codes.

If an ISO 639-2 code that covers a group of languages is used, it might be overridden for some specific languages by a new ISO 639-1 code.

Part 3 (2007) of the standard, ISO 639-3, aiming to cover all known natural languages, largely supersedes the ISO 639-2 three-letter code standard.

There is no specification on treatment of macrolanguages, which are covered by ISO 639-3.

== IETF language tags ==
The use of ISO 639 language codes was encouraged by the introduction of IETF language tags via RFC 1766 in March 1995. The current version of the specification is RFC 5646 from September 2009.

ISO 639-1 codes added after RFC publication in January 2001
ISO 639-1	ISO 639-2	Name	Date added	Previously covered by
io	ido	Ido	2002-01-15	art
wa	wln	Walloon	2002-01-29	roa
li	lim	Limburgish	2002-08-02	gem
ii	iii	Sichuan Yi	2002-10-14	sit
an	arg	Aragonese	2002-12-23	roa
ht	hat	Haitian Creole	2003-02-26	cpf

== See also ==
- Lists of ISO 639 codes
- ISO 3166-1 alpha-2, a different set of two-letter codes used for countries
