= Digram =

Digram or digramme may refer to:

- a bigram or digram, a sequence of two words, syllables, or letters
- a digraph (orthography), a pair of letters used to write one speech sound
- a Taixuanjing symbol with two lines

== See also ==
- Digraph (disambiguation)
- Trigram (disambiguation)
