= List of ISO 639-2 codes =

ISO 639 is a set of international standards that lists short codes for language names. The following is a complete list of three-letter codes defined in part two (ISO 639-2) of the standard, including the corresponding two-letter (ISO 639-1) codes where they exist.

== Codes ==
Where two ISO 639-2 codes are given in the table, the one with the asterisk is the bibliographic code (B code) and the other is the terminological code (T code).

Entries in the Scope column distinguish:

- individual language;
- collections of languages connected, for example genetically or by region;
- macrolanguages.

The Type column distinguishes:

- Living (natural languages in current use);
- Historical (distinct from their modern form);
- Extinct in recent times;
- Constructed.

for individual languages, and

- Genetic;
- Genetic-like;
- Geographic (for regional language groups).

for collectives. The differences between genetic and genetic-like are vague, but usually the former comprises more individual languages than the latter, while the latter comprises more language families than the former.

The standard includes some codes for special situations:

- mis, for "uncoded languages";
- mul, for "multiple languages";
- qaa–qtz, a range reserved for local use;
- und, for "undetermined";
- zxx, for "no linguistic content; not applicable".

| 639-2 | 639-3 | 639-5 | 639-1 | Language name(s) from ISO 639-2 | Scope | Type | Native name(s) | Other name(s) |
|---|---|---|---|---|---|---|---|---|
| aar | aar | | aa | Afar | Individual | Living | Qafaraf; ’Afar Af; Afaraf; Qafar af | |
| abk | abk | | ab | Abkhazian | Individual | Living | Аҧсуа бызшәа Aƥsua bızšwa; Аҧсшәа Aƥsua | Abkhaz |
| ace | ace | | | Achinese | Individual | Living | بهسا اچيه, Basa Acèh | Acehnese |
| ach | ach | | | Acoli | Individual | Living | Lwo | Acholi |
| ada | ada | | | Adangme | Individual | Living | Dangme | Dangme |
| ady | ady | | | Adyghe; Adygei | Individual | Living | Адыгабзэ; Кӏахыбзэ | West Circassian |
| afa | | afa | | Afro-Asiatic languages | Collective | Genetic | | |
| afh | afh | | | Afrihili | Individual | Constructed | El-Afrihili | |
| afr | afr | | af | Afrikaans | Individual | Living | Afrikaans | |
| ain | ain | | | Ainu | Individual | Living | アイヌ・イタㇰ, Ainu-itak | |
| aka | aka | | ak | Akan | Macrolanguage | Living | Akan | |
| akk | akk | | | Akkadian | Individual | Historical | 𒀝𒅗𒁺𒌑, Akkadû | |
| ale | ale | | | Aleut | Individual | Living | Уна́ӈам тунуу́; Унаӈан умсуу | |
| alg | | alg | | Algonquian languages | Collective | Genetic | | |
| alt | alt | | | Southern Altai | Individual | Living | Алтай тили | |
| amh | amh | | am | Amharic | Individual | Living | አማርኛ; Amârıñâ | |
| ang | ang | | | English, Old (ca.450–1100) | Individual | Historical | Ænglisc; Anglisc; Englisc | |
| anp | anp | | | Angika | Individual | Living | अंगिका | |
| apa | | apa | | Apache languages | Collective | Genetic | | Southern Athabaskan languages |
| ara | ara | | ar | Arabic | Macrolanguage | Living | العربية; al'Arabiyyeẗ | |
| arc | arc | | | Official Aramaic (700–300 BCE); Imperial Aramaic (700–300 BCE) | Individual | Historical | | |
| arg | arg | | an | Aragonese | Individual | Living | Aragonés | |
| arn | arn | | | Mapudungun; Mapuche | Individual | Living | Mapudungun | |
| arp | arp | | | Arapaho | Individual | Living | Hinónoʼeitíít | |
| art | | art | | Artificial languages | Collective | Genetic-like | | |
| arw | arw | | | Arawak | Individual | Living | Lokono | Lokono |
| asm | asm | | as | Assamese | Individual | Living | অসমীয়া | |
| ast | ast | | | Asturian; Bable; Leonese; Asturleonese | Individual | Living | Asturianu; Llïonés | |
| ath | | ath | | Athapascan languages | Collective | Genetic | | Athabaskan languages |
| aus | | aus | | Australian languages | Collective | Genetic | | |
| ava | ava | | av | Avaric | Individual | Living | Авар мацӏ; Магӏарул мацӏ | Avar |
| ave | ave | | ae | Avestan | Individual | Historical | | |
| awa | awa | | | Awadhi | Individual | Living | अवधी, Avadhī | |
| aym | aym | | ay | Aymara | Macrolanguage | Living | Aymar aru | |
| aze | aze | | az | Azerbaijani | Macrolanguage | Living | Azərbaycan dili; آذربایجان دیلی; Азәрбајҹан дили | |
| bad | | bad | | Banda languages | Collective | Genetic | | |
| bai | | bai | | Bamileke languages | Collective | Genetic | Bamiléké | |
| bak | bak | | ba | Bashkir | Individual | Living | Башҡорт теле; Başqort tele | |
| bal | bal | | | Baluchi | Macrolanguage | Living | بلۏچی | Balochi |
| bam | bam | | bm | Bambara | Individual | Living | ߓߡߊߣߊ߲ߞߊ߲, Bamanankan | Bambaran |
| ban | ban | | | Balinese | Individual | Living | ᬪᬵᬱᬩᬮᬶ; ᬩᬲᬩᬮᬶ; Basa Bali | |
| bas | bas | | | Basa | Individual | Living | Mbene; Ɓasaá | Basaa |
| bat | | bat | | Baltic languages | Collective | Genetic | | |
| bej | bej | | | Beja; Bedawiyet | Individual | Living | Bidhaawyeet | |
| bel | bel | | be | Belarusian | Individual | Living | Беларуская мова, Belaruskaâ mova | |
| bem | bem | | | Bemba | Individual | Living | Chibemba | |
| ben | ben | | bn | Bengali | Individual | Living | বাংলা, Bāŋlā | |
| ber | | ber | | Berber languages | Collective | Genetic | ⵜⴰⵎⴰⵣⵉⵖⵜ; ⵝⴰⵎⴰⵣⵉⵗⵝ; ⵜⴰⵎⴰⵣⵉⵗⵜ; Tamaziɣt; Tamazight | Amazigh languages |
| bho | bho | | | Bhojpuri | Individual | Living | भोजपुरी | |
| bih | | bih | | Bihari languages | Collective | Genetic | | |
| bik | bik | | | Bikol | Macrolanguage | Living | Bikol | |
| bin | bin | | | Bini; Edo | Individual | Living | Ẹ̀dó | |
| bis | bis | | bi | Bislama | Individual | Living | Bislama | |
| bla | bla | | | Siksika | Individual | Living | ᓱᖽᐧᖿ | Blackfoot |
| bnt | | bnt | | Bantu languages | Collective | Genetic | | |
| bod / tib* | bod | | bo | Tibetan | Individual | Living | བོད་སྐད་, Bodskad; ལྷ་སའི་སྐད་, Lhas'iskad | |
| bos | bos | | bs | Bosnian | Individual | Living | Bosanski | |
| bra | bra | | | Braj | Individual | Living | ब्रजभाषा, Brij Bhasha | Braj Bhāshā |
| bre | bre | | br | Breton | Individual | Living | Brezhoneg | |
| btk | | btk | | Batak languages | Collective | Genetic | | |
| bua | bua | | | Buriat | Macrolanguage | Living | буряад хэлэн | Buryat |
| bug | bug | | | Buginese | Individual | Living | ᨅᨔ ᨕᨘᨁᨗ | |
| bul | bul | | bg | Bulgarian | Individual | Living | български език, Bălgarski ezik | |
| byn | byn | | | Blin; Bilin | Individual | Living | ብሊና; ብሊን | Bilen |
| cad | cad | | | Caddo | Individual | Living | Hasí:nay | |
| cai | | cai | | Central American Indian languages | Collective | Geographic | | |
| car | car | | | Galibi Carib | Individual | Living | Kari'nja | Carib |
| cat | cat | | ca | Catalan; Valencian | Individual | Living | Català, Valencià | |
| cau | | cau | | Caucasian languages | Collective | Geographic | | |
| ceb | ceb | | | Cebuano | Individual | Living | Sinugbuanong Binisayâ | |
| cel | | cel | | Celtic languages | Collective | Genetic | | |
| ces / cze* | ces | | cs | Czech | Individual | Living | Čeština; Český jazyk | Czechian |
| cha | cha | | ch | Chamorro | Individual | Living | Finu' Chamoru | |
| chb | chb | | | Chibcha | Individual | Extinct | Muysccubun | |
| che | che | | ce | Chechen | Individual | Living | Нохчийн мотт; نَاخچیین موٓتت; ნახჩიე მუოთთ | |
| chg | chg | | | Chagatai | Individual | Extinct | جغتای | Eastern Turkic |
| chk | chk | | | Chuukese | Individual | Living | Chuukese | |
| chm | chm | | | Mari | Macrolanguage | Living | марий йылме | |
| chn | chn | | | Chinook Jargon | Individual | Living | Chinuk wawa; wawa; Chinook lelang; lelang | |
| cho | cho | | | Choctaw | Individual | Living | Chahta' | |
| chp | chp | | | Chipewyan; Dene Suline | Individual | Living | ᑌᓀᓱᒼᕄᓀ; Dënesųłiné | |
| chr | chr | | | Cherokee | Individual | Living | ᏣᎳᎩ ᎦᏬᏂᎯᏍᏗ; Tsalagi gawonihisdi | |
| chu | chu | | cu | Church Slavic; Old Slavonic; Church Slavonic; Old Bulgarian; Old Church Slavonic | Individual | Historical | Славе́нскїй ѧ҆зы́къ | |
| chv | chv | | cv | Chuvash | Individual | Living | Чӑвашла | |
| chy | chy | | | Cheyenne | Individual | Living | Tsėhésenėstsestȯtse | |
| cmc | | cmc | | Chamic languages | Collective | Genetic | | |
| cnr | cnr | | | Montenegrin | Individual | Living | Црногорски; Crnogorski | |
| cop | cop | | | Coptic | Individual | Extinct | ϯⲙⲉⲑⲣⲉⲙⲛ̀ⲭⲏⲙⲓ; ⲧⲙⲛ̄ⲧⲣⲙ̄ⲛ̄ⲕⲏⲙⲉ | |
| cor | cor | | kw | Cornish | Individual | Living | Kernowek | |
| cos | cos | | co | Corsican | Individual | Living | Corsu; Lingua corsa | |
| cpe | | cpe | | Creoles and pidgins, English based | Collective | Genetic-like | | |
| cpf | | cpf | | Creoles and pidgins, French-based | Collective | Genetic-like | | |
| cpp | | cpp | | Creoles and pidgins, Portuguese-based | Collective | Genetic-like | | |
| cre | cre | | cr | Cree | Macrolanguage | Living | ᓀᐦᐃᔭᐍᐏᐣ | |
| crh | crh | | | Crimean Tatar; Crimean Turkish | Individual | Living | Къырымтатарджа; Къырымтатар тили; Ҡырымтатарҗа; Ҡырымтатар тили; Qırımtatar tili | |
| crp | | crp | | Creoles and pidgins | Collective | Genetic-like | | |
| csb | csb | | | Kashubian | Individual | Living | Kaszëbsczi jãzëk | Cassubian |
| cus | | cus | | Cushitic languages | Collective | Genetic | | |
| cym / wel* | cym | | cy | Welsh | Individual | Living | Cymraeg; y Gymraeg | |
| dak | dak | | | Dakota | Individual | Living | Dakhótiyapi; Dakȟótiyapi | |
| dan | dan | | da | Danish | Individual | Living | Dansk | |
| dar | dar | | | Dargwa | Individual | Living | Дарган мез | |
| day | | day | | Land Dayak languages | Collective | Genetic | | |
| del | del | | | Delaware | Macrolanguage | Living | Lënapei èlixsuwakàn | |
| den | den | | | Slave (Athapascan) | Macrolanguage | Living | Dene K'e | Slavey |
| deu / ger* | deu | | de | German | Individual | Living | Deutsch | |
| dgr | dgr | | | Tlicho; Dogrib | Individual | Living | Tłı̨chǫ Yatıì | |
| din | din | | | Dinka | Macrolanguage | Living | Thuɔŋjäŋ | |
| div | div | | dv | Divehi; Dhivehi; Maldivian | Individual | Living | ދިވެހި ދިވެހިބަސް, Divehi | |
| doi | doi | | | Dogri | Macrolanguage | Living | 𑠖𑠵𑠌𑠤𑠮; डोगरी; ڈوگرى | |
| dra | | dra | | Dravidian languages | Collective | Genetic | | |
| dsb | dsb | | | Lower Sorbian | Individual | Living | Dolnoserbski; Dolnoserbšćina | |
| dua | dua | | | Duala | Individual | Living | Duálá | |
| dum | dum | | | Dutch, Middle (ca.1050–1350) | Individual | Historical | | |
| dyu | dyu | | | Dyula | Individual | Living | Julakan | Jula |
| dzo | dzo | | dz | Dzongkha | Individual | Living | རྫོང་ཁ་, Ĵoŋkha | |
| efi | efi | | | Efik | Individual | Living | Usem Efịk | |
| egy | egy | | | Egyptian (Ancient) | Individual | Historical | | |
| eka | eka | | | Ekajuk | Individual | Living | Ekajuk | Kajuk |
| ell / gre* | ell | | el | Greek, Modern (1453–) | Individual | Living | Νέα Ελληνικά, Néa Ellêniká | |
| elx | elx | | | Elamite | Individual | Historical | | |
| eng | eng | | en | English | Individual | Living | English | |
| enm | enm | | | English, Middle (1100–1500) | Individual | Historical | | |
| epo | epo | | eo | Esperanto | Individual | Constructed | Esperanto | |
| est | est | | et | Estonian | Macrolanguage | Living | Eesti keel | |
| eus / baq* | eus | | eu | Basque | Individual | Living | Euskara | |
| ewe | ewe | | ee | Ewe | Individual | Living | Èʋegbe | |
| ewo | ewo | | | Ewondo | Individual | Living | Ewondo | Kolo |
| fan | fan | | | Fang | Individual | Living | Fang | |
| fao | fao | | fo | Faroese | Individual | Living | Føroyskt | |
| fas / per* | fas | | fa | Persian | Macrolanguage | Living | فارسی, Fārsī | Farsi |
| fat | fat | | | Fanti | Individual | Living | Mfantse; Fante; Fanti | Fante |
| fij | fij | | fj | Fijian | Individual | Living | Na Vosa Vakaviti | |
| fil | fil | | | Filipino; Pilipino | Individual | Living | Wikang Filipino | |
| fin | fin | | fi | Finnish | Individual | Living | suomen kieli | |
| fiu | | fiu | | Finno-Ugrian languages | Collective | Genetic | | Finno-Ugric languages |
| fon | fon | | | Fon | Individual | Living | Fon gbè | |
| fra / fre* | fra | | fr | French | Individual | Living | Français | |
| frm | frm | | | French, Middle (ca.1400–1600) | Individual | Historical | François; Franceis | |
| fro | fro | | | French, Old (842–ca.1400) | Individual | Historical | Franceis; François; Romanz | |
| frr | frr | | | Northern Frisian | Individual | Living | Frasch; Fresk; Freesk; Friisk | North Frisian |
| frs | frs | | | Eastern Frisian | Individual | Living | Oostfräsk; Oostfreesk; Plattdüütsk | East Frisian Low Saxon |
| fry | fry | | fy | Western Frisian | Individual | Living | Frysk | West Frisian |
| ful | ful | | ff | Fulah | Macrolanguage | Living | Fulfulde; Pulaar; Pular | Fula |
| fur | fur | | | Friulian | Individual | Living | Furlan | |
| gaa | gaa | | | Ga | Individual | Living | Gã | |
| gay | gay | | | Gayo | Individual | Living | Basa Gayo | |
| gba | gba | | | Gbaya | Macrolanguage | Living | Gbaya | |
| gem | | gem | | Germanic languages | Collective | Genetic | | |
| gez | gez | | | Geez | Individual | Historical | ግዕዝ | Ge'ez |
| gil | gil | | | Gilbertese | Individual | Living | Taetae ni Kiribati | |
| gla | gla | | gd | Gaelic; Scottish Gaelic | Individual | Living | Gàidhlig | |
| gle | gle | | ga | Irish | Individual | Living | Gaeilge | |
| glg | glg | | gl | Galician | Individual | Living | Galego | |
| glv | glv | | gv | Manx | Individual | Living | Gaelg; Gailck | |
| gmh | gmh | | | German, Middle High (ca.1050–1500) | Individual | Historical | Diutsch | |
| goh | goh | | | German, Old High (ca.750–1050) | Individual | Historical | Diutisk | |
| gon | gon | | | Gondi | Macrolanguage | Living | गोण्डि; Koitur | |
| gor | gor | | | Gorontalo | Individual | Living | Bahasa Hulontalo | |
| got | got | | | Gothic | Individual | Historical | Gutiska | |
| grb | grb | | | Grebo | Macrolanguage | Living | Kréébo | |
| grc | grc | | | Greek, Ancient (to 1453) | Individual | Historical | Ἑλληνική | |
| grn | grn | | gn | Guarani | Macrolanguage | Living | Avañe'ẽ | |
| gsw | gsw | | | Swiss German; Alemannic; Alsatian | Individual | Living | Schwiizerdütsch | |
| guj | guj | | gu | Gujarati | Individual | Living | ગુજરાતી, Gujarātī | |
| gwi | gwi | | | Gwich'in | Individual | Living | Dinjii Zhu’ Ginjik | |
| hai | hai | | | Haida | Macrolanguage | Living | X̱aat Kíl; X̱aadas Kíl; X̱aayda Kil; Xaad kil | |
| hat | hat | | ht | Haitian; Haitian Creole | Individual | Living | Kreyòl Ayisyen | |
| hau | hau | | ha | Hausa | Individual | Living | Harshen Hausa; هَرْشَن | |
| haw | haw | | | Hawaiian | Individual | Living | ʻŌlelo Hawaiʻi | |
| heb | heb | | he | Hebrew | Individual | Living | עברית, 'Ivriyþ | |
| her | her | | hz | Herero | Individual | Living | Otjiherero | |
| hil | hil | | | Hiligaynon | Individual | Living | Ilonggo | |
| him | | (Note: SIL International treats ISO 639-2 code him (Himachali languages / Western Pahari languages) as an ISO 639-5 code, although it does not appear in the official list of ISO 639-5 codes maintained by the Library of Congress (the registration authority for ISO 639-5).) | | Himachali languages; Pahari languages | Collective | Genetic | | |
| hin | hin | | hi | Hindi | Individual | Living | हिन्दी, Hindī | |
| hit | hit | | | Hittite | Individual | Historical | 𒉈𒅆𒇷 | |
| hmn | hmn | | | Hmong; Mong | Macrolanguage | Living | lus Hmoob; lug Moob; lol Hmongb; 𖬇𖬰𖬞 𖬌𖬣𖬵 | |
| hmo | hmo | | ho | Hiri Motu | Individual | Living | Police Motu | |
| hrv | hrv | | hr | Croatian | Individual | Living | Hrvatski | |
| hsb | hsb | | | Upper Sorbian | Individual | Living | Hornjoserbšćina | |
| hun | hun | | hu | Hungarian | Individual | Living | Magyar nyelv | |
| hup | hup | | | Hupa | Individual | Living | Na:tinixwe Mixine:whe' | |
| hye / arm* | hye | | hy | Armenian | Individual | Living | Հայերէն, Hayerèn; Հայերեն, Hayeren | |
| iba | iba | | | Iban | Individual | Living | Jaku Iban | |
| ibo | ibo | | ig | Igbo | Individual | Living | Asụsụ Igbo | |
| ido | ido | | io | Ido | Individual | Constructed | | |
| iii | iii | | ii | Sichuan Yi; Nuosu | Individual | Living | ꆈꌠꉙ, Nuosuhxop | |
| ijo | | ijo | | Ijo languages | Collective | Genetic | Ịjọ | Ijaw languages |
| iku | iku | | iu | Inuktitut | Macrolanguage | Living | ᐃᓄᒃᑎᑐᑦ, Inuktitut | |
| ile | ile | | ie | Interlingue; Occidental | Individual | Constructed | | |
| ilo | ilo | | | Iloko | Individual | Living | Pagsasao nga Ilokano; Ilokano | Ilocano |
| ina | ina | | ia | Interlingua (International Auxiliary Language Association) | Individual | Constructed | | |
| inc | | inc | | Indic languages | Collective | Genetic | | Indo-Aryan languages |
| ind | ind | | id | Indonesian | Individual | Living | bahasa Indonesia | |
| ine | | ine | | Indo-European languages | Collective | Genetic | | |
| inh | inh | | | Ingush | Individual | Living | ГӀалгӀай мотт | |
| ipk | ipk | | ik | Inupiaq | Macrolanguage | Living | Iñupiaq | |
| ira | | ira | | Iranian languages | Collective | Genetic | | |
| iro | | iro | | Iroquoian languages | Collective | Genetic | | |
| isl / ice* | isl | | is | Icelandic | Individual | Living | Íslenska | |
| ita | ita | | it | Italian | Individual | Living | Italiano; lingua italiana | |
| jav | jav | | jv | Javanese | Individual | Living | ꦧꦱꦗꦮ; Basa Jawa | |
| jbo | jbo | | | Lojban | Individual | Constructed | la .lojban. | |
| jpn | jpn | | ja | Japanese | Individual | Living | 日本語; Nihongo | |
| jpr | jpr | | | Judeo-Persian | Individual | Living | Dzhidi | |
| jrb | jrb | | | Judeo-Arabic | Macrolanguage | Living | ערבית יהודית; عربية يهودية | |
| kaa | kaa | | | Kara-Kalpak | Individual | Living | Qaraqalpaq tili; Қарақалпақ тили | Karakalpak |
| kab | kab | | | Kabyle | Individual | Living | Tamaziɣt Taqbaylit; Tazwawt | |
| kac | kac | | | Kachin; Jingpho | Individual | Living | Jingpho | |
| kal | kal | | kl | Kalaallisut; Greenlandic | Individual | Living | Kalaallisut | |
| kam | kam | | | Kamba | Individual | Living | Kikamba | |
| kan | kan | | kn | Kannada | Individual | Living | ಕನ್ನಡ; Kannađa | |
| kar | | kar | | Karen languages | Collective | Genetic | | Karenic languages |
| kas | kas | | ks | Kashmiri | Individual | Living | कॉशुर; كأشُر | |
| kat / geo* | kat | | ka | Georgian | Individual | Living | ქართული; Kharthuli | |
| kau | kau | | kr | Kanuri | Macrolanguage | Living | Kànùrí | |
| kaw | kaw | | | Kawi | Individual | Historical | ꦧꦱꦗꦮ | |
| kaz | kaz | | kk | Kazakh | Individual | Living | Қазақ тілі; Qazaq tili | |
| kbd | kbd | | | Kabardian | Individual | Living | Адыгэбзэ (Къэбэрдейбзэ); Adıgăbză (Qăbărdeĭbză) | |
| kha | kha | | | Khasi | Individual | Living | কা কতিয়েন খাশি, Ka Ktien Khasi | |
| khi | | khi | | Khoisan languages | Collective | Genetic | | |
| khm | khm | | km | Central Khmer | Individual | Living | ភាសាខ្មែរ, Phiəsaakhmær | |
| kho | kho | | | Khotanese; Sakan | Individual | Historical | | Saka |
| kik | kik | | ki | Kikuyu; Gikuyu | Individual | Living | Gĩkũyũ | |
| kin | kin | | rw | Kinyarwanda | Individual | Living | Ikinyarwanda | |
| kir | kir | | ky | Kirghiz; Kyrgyz | Individual | Living | Кыргызча, Kırgızça; Кыргыз тили, Kırgız tili | |
| kmb | kmb | | | Kimbundu | Individual | Living | Kimbundu | |
| kok | kok | | | Konkani | Macrolanguage | Living | कोंकणी | |
| kom | kom | | kv | Komi | Macrolanguage | Living | Коми кыв | |
| kon | kon | | kg | Kongo | Macrolanguage | Living | Kikongo | |
| kor | kor | | ko | Korean | Individual | Living | 한국어, Han'gug'ô | |
| kos | kos | | | Kosraean | Individual | Living | Kosraean | |
| kpe | kpe | | | Kpelle | Macrolanguage | Living | Kpɛlɛwoo | |
| krc | krc | | | Karachay-Balkar | Individual | Living | Къарачай-Малкъар тил; Таулу тил | |
| krl | krl | | | Karelian | Individual | Living | Kard'al; Kariela; Karjala | |
| kro | | kro | | Kru languages | Collective | Genetic | | |
| kru | kru | | | Kurukh | Individual | Living | कुड़ुख़ | |
| kua | kua | | kj | Kuanyama; Kwanyama | Individual | Living | Oshikwanyama | |
| kum | kum | | | Kumyk | Individual | Living | Къумукъ тил, Qumuq til | |
| kur | kur | | ku | Kurdish | Macrolanguage | Living | کوردی, Kurdî | |
| kut | kut | | | Kutenai | Individual | Living | Ktunaxa | |
| lad | lad | | | Ladino | Individual | Living | Judeo-español | Judaeo-Spanish |
| lah | lah | | | Lahnda | Macrolanguage | Living | بھارت کا | Western Punjabi |
| lam | lam | | | Lamba | Individual | Living | Ichilamba | |
| lao | lao | | lo | Lao | Individual | Living | ພາສາລາວ, Phasalaw | |
| lat | lat | | la | Latin | Individual | Historical | Lingua latīna | |
| lav | lav | | lv | Latvian | Macrolanguage | Living | Latviešu valoda | |
| lez | lez | | | Lezghian | Individual | Living | Лезги чӏал | Lezgian |
| lim | lim | | li | Limburgan; Limburger; Limburgish | Individual | Living | Lèmburgs | |
| lin | lin | | ln | Lingala | Individual | Living | Lingála | |
| lit | lit | | lt | Lithuanian | Individual | Living | Lietuvių kalba | |
| lol | lol | | | Mongo | Individual | Living | Lomongo | |
| loz | loz | | | Lozi | Individual | Living | Silozi | |
| ltz | ltz | | lb | Luxembourgish; Letzeburgesch | Individual | Living | Lëtzebuergesch | |
| lua | lua | | | Luba-Lulua | Individual | Living | Cilubà; Tshiluba | Luba-Kasai |
| lub | lub | | lu | Luba-Katanga | Individual | Living | Kiluba | |
| lug | lug | | lg | Ganda | Individual | Living | Luganda | Luganda |
| lui | lui | | | Luiseno | Individual | Extinct | Cham'teela | |
| lun | lun | | | Lunda | Individual | Living | Chilunda | Lundan |
| luo | luo | | | Luo (Kenya and Tanzania) | Individual | Living | Dholuo | |
| lus | lus | | | Lushai | Individual | Living | Mizo ṭawng | Mizo |
| mad | mad | | | Madurese | Individual | Living | Madhura | |
| mag | mag | | | Magahi | Individual | Living | मगही | Magadhi |
| mah | mah | | mh | Marshallese | Individual | Living | Kajin M̧ajeļ | |
| mai | mai | | | Maithili | Individual | Living | मैथिली; মৈথিলী | |
| mak | mak | | | Makasar | Individual | Living | ᨅᨔ ᨆᨀᨔᨑ, basa Mangkasara' | Makassarese |
| mal | mal | | ml | Malayalam | Individual | Living | മലയാളം, Malayāḷaṁ | |
| man | man | | | Mandingo | Macrolanguage | Living | Mandi'nka kango, ߡߊ߲߬ߘߌ߲߬ߞߊ, مَانْدِنْجَوْ | Manding; Mandikan |
| map | | map | | Austronesian languages | Collective | Genetic | | |
| mar | mar | | mr | Marathi | Individual | Living | मराठी, Marāţhī | |
| mas | mas | | | Masai | Individual | Living | ɔl Maa | Maasai |
| mdf | mdf | | | Moksha | Individual | Living | Мокшень кяль | |
| mdr | mdr | | | Mandar | Individual | Living | Mandar | |
| men | men | | | Mende | Individual | Living | Mɛnde yia | |
| mga | mga | | | Irish, Middle (900–1200) | Individual | Historical | Gaoidhealg | |
| mic | mic | | | Mi'kmaq; Micmac | Individual | Living | Míkmawísimk | |
| min | min | | | Minangkabau | Individual | Living | Baso Minang | |
| mis | mis | | | Uncoded languages | Special | Special | | |
| mkd / mac* | mkd | | mk | Macedonian | Individual | Living | Македонски јазик, Makedonski jazik | |
| mkh | | mkh | | Mon-Khmer languages | Collective | Genetic | | Austroasiatic languages |
| mlg | mlg | | mg | Malagasy | Macrolanguage | Living | مَلَغَسِ | |
| mlt | mlt | | mt | Maltese | Individual | Living | Malti | |
| mnc | mnc | | | Manchu | Individual | Living | ᠮᠠᠨᠵᡠ ᡤᡳᠰᡠᠨ, Manju gisun | |
| mni | mni | | | Manipuri | Individual | Living | মৈতৈলোন, ꯃꯩꯇꯩꯂꯣꯟ, Meiteilon | Meitei |
| mno | | mno | | Manobo languages | Collective | Genetic | | |
| moh | moh | | | Mohawk | Individual | Living | Kanien’kéha | |
| mon | mon | | mn | Mongolian | Macrolanguage | Living | ᠮᠣᠩᠭᠣᠯ ᠬᠡᠯᠡ, Монгол хэл | |
| mos | mos | | | Mossi | Individual | Living | Mooré | |
| mri / mao* | mri | | mi | Maori | Individual | Living | Te Reo Māori | Māori |
| msa / may* | msa | | ms | Malay | Macrolanguage | Living | Bahasa Melayu | Malaysian |
| mul | mul | | | Multiple languages | Special | Special | | |
| mun | | mun | | Munda languages | Collective | Genetic | | |
| mus | mus | | | Creek | Individual | Living | Mvskoke | Muscogee |
| mwl | mwl | | | Mirandese | Individual | Living | Mirandés; lhéngua Mirandesa | |
| mwr | mwr | | | Marwari | Macrolanguage | Living | मारवाड़ी | |
| mya / bur* | mya | | my | Burmese | Individual | Living | မြန်မာစာ, Mrãmācā; မြန်မာစကား, Mrãmākā: | |
| myn | | myn | | Mayan languages | Collective | Genetic | | |
| myv | myv | | | Erzya | Individual | Living | Ерзянь кель | |
| nah | | nah | | Nahuatl languages | Collective | Genetic | | Nahuan languages |
| nai | | nai | | North American Indian languages | Collective | Geographic | | |
| nap | nap | | | Neapolitan | Individual | Living | Napulitano | |
| nau | nau | | na | Nauru | Individual | Living | dorerin Naoero | Nauruan |
| nav | nav | | nv | Navajo; Navaho | Individual | Living | Diné bizaad; Naabeehó bizaad | |
| nbl | nbl | | nr | Ndebele, South; South Ndebele | Individual | Living | isiNdebele seSewula | Southern Ndebele |
| nde | nde | | nd | Ndebele, North; North Ndebele | Individual | Living | siNdebele saseNyakatho | Northern Ndebele |
| ndo | ndo | | ng | Ndonga | Individual | Living | Ndonga | |
| nds | nds | | | Low German; Low Saxon; German, Low; Saxon, Low | Individual | Living | Plattdütsch | |
| nep | nep | | ne | Nepali | Macrolanguage | Living | नेपाली, Gorkhali | |
| new | new | | | Nepal Bhasa; Newari | Individual | Living | नेपाल भाषा, Nepāla bhāṣā | Newar |
| nia | nia | | | Nias | Individual | Living | Li Niha | |
| nic | | nic | | Niger-Kordofanian languages | Collective | Genetic | | Niger-Congo languages |
| niu | niu | | | Niuean | Individual | Living | ko e vagahau Niuē | |
| nld / dut* | nld | | nl | Dutch; Flemish | Individual | Living | Nederlands; Vlaams | |
| nno | nno | | nn | Norwegian Nynorsk; Nynorsk, Norwegian | Individual | Living | Norsk Nynorsk | Nynorsk |
| nob | nob | | nb | Bokmål, Norwegian; Norwegian Bokmål | Individual | Living | Norsk Bokmål | Bokmål |
| nog | nog | | | Nogai | Individual | Living | Ногай тили | |
| non | non | | | Norse, Old | Individual | Historical | Dǫnsk tunga; Norrœnt mál | |
| nor | nor | | no | Norwegian | Macrolanguage | Living | Norsk | |
| nqo | nqo | | | N'Ko | Individual | Living | ߒߞߏ | |
| nso | nso | | | Pedi; Sepedi; Northern Sotho | Individual | Living | Sesotho sa Leboa | |
| nub | | nub | | Nubian languages | Collective | Genetic | لغات نوبية | |
| nwc | nwc | | | Classical Newari; Old Newari; Classical Nepal Bhasa | Individual | Historical | पुलां भाय्; पुलाङु नेपाल भाय् | |
| nya | nya | | ny | Chichewa; Chewa; Nyanja | Individual | Living | Chichewa; Chinyanja | Chichewan; Chewan |
| nym | nym | | | Nyamwezi | Individual | Living | KiNyamwezi | |
| nyn | nyn | | | Nyankole | Individual | Living | Orunyankore | Nkore |
| nyo | nyo | | | Nyoro | Individual | Living | Orunyoro | |
| nzi | nzi | | | Nzima | Individual | Living | Nzema | Nzema |
| oci | oci | | oc | Occitan (post 1500) | Individual | Living | Occitan; lenga d'Òc | |
| oji | oji | | oj | Ojibwa | Macrolanguage | Living | ᐊᓂᐦᔑᓈᐯᒧᐎᓐ; Anishinaabemowin | Ojibwe; Ojibwan |
| ori | ori | | or | Oriya | Macrolanguage | Living | ଓଡ଼ିଆ | Odia; Odishan |
| orm | orm | | om | Oromo | Macrolanguage | Living | Afaan Oromoo | |
| osa | osa | | | Osage | Individual | Living | 𐓏𐓘𐓻𐓘𐓻𐓟 𐒻𐓟, Wazhazhe ie | |
| oss | oss | | os | Ossetian; Ossetic | Individual | Living | Ирон ӕвзаг, Iron ævzag | |
| ota | ota | | | Turkish, Ottoman (1500–1928) | Individual | Historical | لسان عثمانى, lisân-ı Osmânî | |
| oto | | oto | | Otomian languages | Collective | Genetic | | Oto-Pamean languages |
| paa | | paa | | Papuan languages | Collective | Geographic | | |
| pag | pag | | | Pangasinan | Individual | Living | Salitan Pangasinan | |
| pal | pal | | | Pahlavi | Individual | Historical | Pārsīk; Pārsīg | Middle Persian |
| pam | pam | | | Pampanga; Kapampangan | Individual | Living | Amánung Kapampangan; Amánung Sísuan | |
| pan | pan | | pa | Panjabi; Punjabi | Individual | Living | ਪੰਜਾਬੀ, پنجابی, Pãjābī | |
| pap | pap | | | Papiamento | Individual | Living | Papiamentu | |
| pau | pau | | | Palauan | Individual | Living | a tekoi er a Belau | |
| peo | peo | | | Persian, Old (ca.600–400 B.C.) | Individual | Historical | | |
| phi | | phi | | Philippine languages | Collective | Geographic | | |
| phn | phn | | | Phoenician | Individual | Historical | 𐤃𐤁𐤓𐤉𐤌 𐤊𐤍𐤏𐤍𐤉𐤌, Dabariym Kana'aniym | |
| pli | pli | | pi | Pali | Individual | Historical | Pāli | |
| pol | pol | | pl | Polish | Individual | Living | Język polski | |
| pon | pon | | | Pohnpeian | Individual | Living | Lokaiahn Pohnpei | |
| por | por | | pt | Portuguese | Individual | Living | Português | |
| pra | | pra | | Prakrit languages | Collective | Genetic | | |
| pro | pro | | | Provençal, Old (to 1500); Old Occitan (to 1500) | Individual | Historical | | |
| pus | pus | | ps | Pushto; Pashto | Macrolanguage | Living | پښتو, Pax̌tow | |
| qaa-qtz | qaa-qtz | | | Reserved for local use | Local | | | |
| que | que | | qu | Quechua | Macrolanguage | Living | Runa simi; kichwa simi; Nuna shimi | |
| raj | raj | | | Rajasthani | Macrolanguage | Living | राजस्थानी | |
| rap | rap | | | Rapanui | Individual | Living | Vananga rapa nui | |
| rar | rar | | | Rarotongan; Cook Islands Maori | Individual | Living | Māori Kūki 'Āirani | Cook Islands Māori |
| roa | | roa | | Romance languages | Collective | Genetic | | |
| roh | roh | | rm | Romansh | Individual | Living | Rumantsch; Rumàntsch; Romauntsch; Romontsch | |
| rom | rom | | | Romany | Macrolanguage | Living | Romani čhib | Romani |
| ron / rum* | ron | | ro | Romanian; Moldavian; Moldovan | Individual | Living | limba Română | |
| run | run | | rn | Rundi | Individual | Living | Ikirundi | Kirundi |
| rup | rup | | | Aromanian; Arumanian; Macedo-Romanian (Note: The term "Macedo-Romanian" might also be used for the Megleno-Romanians and their language.) | Individual | Living | Armãneashce; Armãneashti; Rrãmãneshti | |
| rus | rus | | ru | Russian | Individual | Living | Русский язык | |
| sad | sad | | | Sandawe | Individual | Living | Sàndàwé kì’ìng | |
| sag | sag | | sg | Sango | Individual | Living | yângâ tî Sängö | |
| sah | sah | | | Yakut | Individual | Living | Сахалыы | |
| sai | | sai | | South American Indian languages | Collective | Geographic | | |
| sal | | sal | | Salishan languages | Collective | Genetic | | |
| sam | sam | | | Samaritan Aramaic | Individual | Extinct | ארמית | |
| san | san | | sa | Sanskrit | Macrolanguage | Historical | संस्कृतम् Sąskŕtam; 𑌸𑌂𑌸𑍍𑌕𑍃𑌤𑌮𑍍 | |
| sas | sas | | | Sasak | Individual | Living | ᬪᬵᬲᬵᬲᬓ᭄ᬱᬓ᭄, Base Sasak | |
| sat | sat | | | Santali | Individual | Living | ᱥᱟᱱᱛᱟᱲᱤ | |
| scn | scn | | | Sicilian | Individual | Living | Sicilianu | |
| sco | sco | | | Scots | Individual | Living | Braid Scots; Lallans | |
| sel | sel | | | Selkup | Individual | Living | Чу́мэл шэ | |
| sem | | sem | | Semitic languages | Collective | Genetic | | |
| sga | sga | | | Irish, Old (to 900) | Individual | Historical | Goídelc | |
| sgn | | sgn | | Sign languages | Collective | Genetic-like | | |
| shn | shn | | | Shan | Individual | Living | ၵႂၢမ်းတႆးယႂ်, Kwam Tai Yai | |
| sid | sid | | | Sidamo | Individual | Living | Sidaamu Afoo | |
| sin | sin | | si | Sinhala; Sinhalese | Individual | Living | සිංහල, Sĩhala | |
| sio | | sio | | Siouan-Catawban languages | Collective | Genetic | | |
| sit | | sit | | Sino-Tibetan languages | Collective | Genetic | | |
| sla | | sla | | Slavic languages | Collective | Genetic | | |
| slk / slo* | slk | | sk | Slovak | Individual | Living | Slovenčina; Slovenský jazyk | |
| slv | slv | | sl | Slovenian | Individual | Living | Slovenščina; Slovenski jezik | Slovene |
| sma | sma | | | Southern Sami | Individual | Living | Åarjelsaemien gïele | |
| sme | sme | | se | Northern Sami | Individual | Living | Davvisámegiella | |
| smi | | smi | | Sami languages | Collective | Genetic | | |
| smj | smj | | | Lule Sami | Individual | Living | Julevsámegiella | |
| smn | smn | | | Inari Sami | Individual | Living | Anarâškielâ | |
| smo | smo | | sm | Samoan | Individual | Living | Gagana faʻa Sāmoa | |
| sms | sms | | | Skolt Sami | Individual | Living | Sääʹmǩiõll | |
| sna | sna | | sn | Shona | Individual | Living | chiShona | |
| snd | snd | | sd | Sindhi | Individual | Living | सिन्धी, سنڌي | |
| snk | snk | | | Soninke | Individual | Living | Sooninkanxanne | |
| sog | sog | | | Sogdian | Individual | Historical | | |
| som | som | | so | Somali | Individual | Living | af Soomaali | |
| son | | son | | Songhai languages | Collective | Genetic | | Songhay languages |
| sot | sot | | st | Sotho, Southern | Individual | Living | Sesotho; Sesotho sa Borwa | |
| spa | spa | | es | Spanish; Castilian | Individual | Living | Español; Castellano | |
| sqi / alb* | sqi | | sq | Albanian | Macrolanguage | Living | Shqip | |
| srd | srd | | sc | Sardinian | Macrolanguage | Living | Sardu; limba Sarda; lingua Sarda | |
| srn | srn | | | Sranan Tongo | Individual | Living | Sranan Tongo | |
| srp | srp | | sr | Serbian | Individual | Living | Српски, Srpski | |
| srr | srr | | | Serer | Individual | Living | Seereer | |
| ssa | | ssa | | Nilo-Saharan languages | Collective | Genetic | | |
| ssw | ssw | | ss | Swati | Individual | Living | siSwati | Swazi |
| suk | suk | | | Sukuma | Individual | Living | Kɪsukuma | |
| sun | sun | | su | Sundanese | Individual | Living | ᮘᮞ ᮞᮥᮔ᮪ᮓ, basa Sunda | |
| sus | sus | | | Susu | Individual | Living | Sosoxui | |
| sux | sux | | | Sumerian | Individual | Historical | 𒅴𒂠 | |
| swa | swa | | sw | Swahili | Macrolanguage | Living | Kiswahili | |
| swe | swe | | sv | Swedish | Individual | Living | Svenska | |
| syc | syc | | | Classical Syriac | Individual | Historical | | |
| syr | syr | | | Syriac | Macrolanguage | Living | ܠܫܢܐ ܣܘܪܝܝܐ, Lešānā Suryāyā | |
| tah | tah | | ty | Tahitian | Individual | Living | Reo Tahiti; Reo Mā'ohi | |
| tai | | tai | | Tai languages | Collective | Genetic | ภาษาไท; ภาษาไต | |
| tam | tam | | ta | Tamil | Individual | Living | தமிழ், Tamił | |
| tat | tat | | tt | Tatar | Individual | Living | Татар теле, Tatar tele, تاتار | |
| tel | tel | | te | Telugu | Individual | Living | తెలుగు, Telugu | |
| tem | tem | | | Timne | Individual | Living | KʌThemnɛ | Temne |
| ter | ter | | | Tereno | Individual | Living | Terêna | Terena |
| tet | tet | | | Tetum | Individual | Living | Lia-Tetun | |
| tgk | tgk | | tg | Tajik | Individual | Living | Тоҷикӣ, toçikī | |
| tgl | tgl | | tl | Tagalog | Individual | Living | Wikang Tagalog | |
| tha | tha | | th | Thai | Individual | Living | ภาษาไทย, Phasathay | |
| tig | tig | | | Tigre | Individual | Living | ትግረ; ትግሬ; ኻሳ; ትግራይት | |
| tir | tir | | ti | Tigrinya | Individual | Living | ትግርኛ | |
| tiv | tiv | | | Tiv | Individual | Living | Tiv | |
| tkl | tkl | | | Tokelau | Individual | Living | gagana Tokelau | Tokelauan |
| tlh | tlh | | | Klingon; tlhIngan-Hol | Individual | Constructed | | |
| tli | tli | | | Tlingit | Individual | Living | Lingít | |
| tmh | tmh | | | Tamashek | Macrolanguage | Living | | Tuareg; Tamasheq |
| tog | tog | | | Tonga (Nyasa) | Individual | Living | chiTonga | |
| ton | ton | | to | Tonga (Tonga Islands) | Individual | Living | lea faka-Tonga | Tongan |
| tpi | tpi | | | Tok Pisin | Individual | Living | Tok Pisin | |
| tsi | tsi | | | Tsimshian | Individual | Living | Tsmksian | |
| tsn | tsn | | tn | Tswana | Individual | Living | Setswana | |
| tso | tso | | ts | Tsonga | Individual | Living | Xitsonga | Tsongan |
| tuk | tuk | | tk | Turkmen | Individual | Living | Türkmençe, Түркменче, تۆرکمنچه; Türkmen dili, Түркмен дили, تۆرکمن ديلی | |
| tum | tum | | | Tumbuka | Individual | Living | chiTumbuka | Tumbukan |
| tup | | tup | | Tupi languages | Collective | Genetic | | Tupian languages |
| tur | tur | | tr | Turkish | Individual | Living | Türkçe | |
| tut | | tut | | Altaic languages | Collective | Genetic | | |
| tvl | tvl | | | Tuvalu | Individual | Living | Te Ggana Tuuvalu; Te Gagana Tuuvalu | Tuvaluan |
| twi | twi | | tw | Twi | Individual | Living | Twi | |
| tyv | tyv | | | Tuvinian | Individual | Living | Тыва дыл | Tuvan |
| udm | udm | | | Udmurt | Individual | Living | Удмурт кыл | |
| uga | uga | | | Ugaritic | Individual | Historical | | |
| uig | uig | | ug | Uighur; Uyghur | Individual | Living | ئۇيغۇر تىلى, Uyghur tili | |
| ukr | ukr | | uk | Ukrainian | Individual | Living | Українська мова; Українська | |
| umb | umb | | | Umbundu | Individual | Living | Úmbúndú | |
| und | und | | | Undetermined | Special | Special | | |
| urd | urd | | ur | Urdu | Individual | Living | اُردُو Urduw | |
| uzb | uzb | | uz | Uzbek | Macrolanguage | Living | Oʻzbekcha, Ózbekça, ўзбекча, ئوزبېچه; oʻzbek tili, ўзбек тили, ئوبېک تیلی | |
| vai | vai | | | Vai | Individual | Living | ꕙꔤ | |
| ven | ven | | ve | Venda | Individual | Living | Tshivenḓa | |
| vie | vie | | vi | Vietnamese | Individual | Living | Tiếng Việt | |
| vol | vol | | vo | Volapük | Individual | Constructed | | |
| vot | vot | | | Votic | Individual | Living | Vaďďa tšeeli | |
| wak | | wak | | Wakashan languages | Collective | Genetic | | |
| wal | wal | | | Wolaitta; Wolaytta | Individual | Living | Wolayttatto Doonaa | |
| war | war | | | Waray | Individual | Living | Winaray; Samareño; Lineyte-Samarnon; Binisayâ nga Winaray; Binisayâ nga Samar-Leyte; Binisayâ nga Waray | |
| was | was | | | Washo | Individual | Living | Wá:šiw ʔítlu | |
| wen | | wen | | Sorbian languages | Collective | Genetic | Serbsce; Serbski | |
| wln | wln | | wa | Walloon | Individual | Living | Walon | |
| wol | wol | | wo | Wolof | Individual | Living | Wolof làkk | |
| xal | xal | | | Kalmyk; Oirat | Individual | Living | Хальмг келн, Xaľmg keln | |
| xho | xho | | xh | Xhosa | Individual | Living | isiXhosa | |
| yao | yao | | | Yao | Individual | Living | chiYao | |
| yap | yap | | | Yapese | Individual | Living | Thin nu Waqaab | |
| yid | yid | | yi | Yiddish | Macrolanguage | Living | ייִדיש; יידיש; אידיש Yidiš | Judeo-German |
| yor | yor | | yo | Yoruba | Individual | Living | èdè Yorùbá | |
| ypk | | ypk | | Yupik languages | Collective | Genetic | | |
| zap | zap | | | Zapotec | Macrolanguage | Living | Diidxazá, Dizhsa | |
| zbl | zbl | | | Blissymbols; Blissymbolics; Bliss | Individual | Constructed | | |
| zen | zen | | | Zenaga | Individual | Living | Tuẓẓungiyya | |
| zgh | zgh | | | Standard Moroccan Tamazight | Individual | Living | ⵜⴰⵎⴰⵣⵉⵖⵜ ⵜⴰⵏⴰⵡⴰⵢⵜ | Standard Moroccan Berber |
| zha | zha | | za | Zhuang; Chuang | Macrolanguage | Living | 話僮, Vahcuengh | |
| zho / chi* | zho | | zh | Chinese | Macrolanguage | Living | 中文; Zhōngwén; 汉语; 漢語; Hànyǔ | |
| znd | | znd | | Zande languages | Collective | Genetic | | |
| zul | zul | | zu | Zulu | Individual | Living | isiZulu | |
| zun | zun | | | Zuni | Individual | Living | Shiwi'ma | |
| zxx | zxx | | | No linguistic content; Not applicable | Special | Special | | |
| zza | zza | | | Zaza; Dimili; Dimli; Kirdki; Kirmanjki; Zazaki | Macrolanguage | Living | Kirmanckî; Dimilkî; Kirdkî; Zazakî | Zazan |

*Synonyms for terminology applications (ISO 639-2/T) and for *bibliographic applications (ISO 639-2/B)

== See also ==
- Lists of ISO 639 codes
