= ISO 639-5 =

International standard codes for language families

ISO 639-5:2008 "Codes for the representation of names of languages—Part 5: Alpha-3 code for language families and groups" is an international standard published by the International Organization for Standardization (ISO). It was developed by ISO Technical Committee 37, Subcommittee 2, and first published on May 15, 2008. It is part of the ISO 639 series of standards.

== Collective codes ==
This is a list of ISO 639-5 codes, including the code hierarchy as given in the ISO 639-5 registry. The code und (undetermined) from ISO 639-2 can be seen as top of the hierarchy (for example, und:aav, und:euq:eu). The hierarchy is not a complete genetic hierarchy; some of the collection codes are based on geography (like nai) or category (like crp) instead.

ISO 639-5 defines alpha-3 (3-letter) codes, called "collective codes", that identify language families and groups. As of the February 11, 2013, update to ISO 639-5, the standard defines 115 collective codes. The United States Library of Congress maintains the list of Alpha-3 codes that comprise ISO 639-5.

The standard does not cover all language families used by linguists. The languages covered by a group code need not be linguistically related, but may have a geographic relation, or category relation (such as Creoles).

Hierarchy	639-5	639-2	Language collection name	Notes
aav	aav		Austro-Asiatic languages	South-Asiatic languages, not related to Australian languages
afa	afa	afa	Afro-Asiatic languages	
nai:aql:alg	alg	alg	Algonquian languages	
nic:alv	alv		Atlantic-Congo languages	
nai:xnd:ath:apa	apa	apa	Apache languages	
sai:aqa	aqa		Alacalufan languages	
nai:aql	aql		Algic languages	
art	art	art	Artificial languages	
nai:xnd:ath	ath	ath	Athapascan languages	
sai:awd:auf	auf		Arauan languages	
aus	aus	aus	Australian languages	
sai:awd	awd		Arawakan languages	
nai:azc	azc		Uto-Aztecan languages	
nic:alv:bad	bad	bad	Banda languages	
nic:alv:bai	bai	bai	Bamileke languages	
ine:bat	bat	bat	Baltic languages	
afa:ber	ber	ber	Berber languages	
ine:iir:inc:bih	bih	bih	Bihari languages	
nic:alv:bnt	bnt	bnt	Bantu languages	
map:poz:pqw:btk	btk	btk	Batak languages	
cai	cai	cai	Central American Indian languages	
cau	cau	cau	Caucasian languages	
sai:cba	cba		Chibchan languages	
cau:ccn	ccn		North Caucasian languages	
cau:ccs	ccs		South Caucasian languages	
afa:cdc	cdc		Chadic languages	
nai:cdd	cdd		Caddoan languages	
ine:cel	cel	cel	Celtic languages	
map:poz:pqw:cmc	cmc	cmc	Chamic languages	
crp:cpe	cpe	cpe	Creoles and pidgins, English-based	
crp:cpf	cpf	cpf	Creoles and pidgins, French-based	
crp:cpp	cpp	cpp	Creoles and pidgins, Portuguese-based	
crp	crp	crp	Creoles and pidgins	
ssa:csu	csu		Central Sudanic languages	
afa:cus	cus	cus	Cushitic languages	
map:poz:pqw:day	day	day	Land Dayak languages	not to be confused with Dayak languages, which is a larger group
nic:dmn	dmn		Mande languages	
dra	dra	dra	Dravidian languages	
afa:egx	egx		Egyptian languages	
esx	esx		Eskimo-Aleut languages	
euq	euq		Basque (family)	Basque (eu/eus/baq) is an individual language covered by this collection code
urj:fiu	fiu	fiu	Finno-Ugrian languages	
map:fox	fox		Formosan languages	
ine:gem	gem	gem	Germanic languages	
ine:gem:gme	gme		East Germanic languages	
ine:gem:gmq	gmq		North Germanic languages	
ine:gem:gmw	gmw		West Germanic languages	
ine:grk	grk		Greek languages	
ine:iir:inc:him	(Note: SIL International treats ISO 639-2 code him (Himachali languages / Western Pahari languages) as an ISO 639-5 code, although it does not appear in the official list of ISO 639-5 codes maintained by the Library of Congress (the registration authority for ISO 639-5).)	him	Western Pahari languages	
hmx	hmx		Hmong-Mien languages	
nai:hok	hok		Hokan languages	
ine:hyx	hyx		Armenian (family)	Armenian (hy/hye/arm) is an individual language covered by this collection code
ine:iir	iir		Indo-Iranian languages	
nic:ijo	ijo	ijo	Ijo languages	
ine:iir:inc	inc	inc	Indic languages	
ine	ine	ine	Indo-European languages	
ine:iir:ira	ira	ira	Iranian languages	
nai:iro	iro	iro	Iroquoian languages	
ine:itc	itc		Italic languages	
jpx	jpx		Japanese (family)	Japanese (ja/jpn) is an individual language covered by this collection code
sit:tbq:kar	kar	kar	Karen languages	
nic:kdo	kdo		Kordofanian languages	
khi	khi	khi	Khoisan languages	
nic:alv:kro	kro	kro	Kru languages	
map	map	map	Austronesian languages	
aav:mkh	mkh	mkh	Mon-Khmer languages	
map:poz:pqw:phi:mno	mno	mno	Manobo languages	
aav:mun	mun	mun	Munda languages	
cai:myn	myn	myn	Mayan languages	
nai:azc:nah	nah	nah	Nahuatl languages	
nai	nai	nai	North American Indian languages	
paa:ngf	ngf		Trans-New Guinea languages	
nic	nic	nic	Niger-Kordofanian languages	
ssa:sdv:nub	nub	nub	Nubian languages	
cai:omq	omq		Oto-Manguean languages	
afa:omv	omv		Omotic languages	
cai:omq:oto	oto	oto	Otomian languages	
paa	paa	paa	Papuan languages	
map:poz:pqw:phi	phi	phi	Philippine languages	
map:poz:plf	plf		Central Malayo-Polynesian languages	
map:poz	poz		Malayo-Polynesian languages	
map:poz:pqe	pqe		Eastern Malayo-Polynesian languages	
map:poz:pqw	pqw		Western Malayo-Polynesian languages	
ine:iir:inc:pra	pra	pra	Prakrit languages	
sai:qwe	qwe		Quechuan (family)	Quechua (qu/que) is a macrolanguage covered by this collection code
ine:itc:roa	roa	roa	Romance languages	
sai	sai	sai	South American Indian languages	
nai:sal	sal	sal	Salishan languages	
ssa:sdv	sdv		Eastern Sudanic languages	
afa:sem	sem	sem	Semitic languages	
sgn	sgn	sgn	sign languages	
nai:sio	sio	sio	Siouan languages	
sit	sit	sit	Sino-Tibetan languages	
ine:sla	sla	sla	Slavic languages	
urj:fiu:smi	smi	smi	Sami languages	
ssa:son	son	son	Songhai languages	
ine:sqj	sqj		Albanian languages	Albanian (sq/sqi/alb) is a macrolanguage covered by this collection code
ssa	ssa	ssa	Nilo-Saharan languages	
urj:syd	syd		Samoyedic languages	
tai	tai	tai	Tai languages	Thai (th/tha) is an individual language covered by this collection code
sit:tbq	tbq		Tibeto-Burman languages	
tut:trk	trk		Turkic languages	Turkish (tr/tur) is an individual language covered by this collection code
sai:tup	tup	tup	Tupi languages	
tut	tut	tut	Altaic languages	
tut:tuw	tuw		Tungus languages	
urj	urj		Uralic languages	
nai:wak	wak	wak	Wakashan languages	
ine:sla:zlw:wen	wen	wen	Sorbian languages	
tut:xgn	xgn		Mongolian languages	Mongolian (mn/mon) is a macrolanguage covered by this collection code
nai:xnd	xnd		Na-Dene languages	
esx:ypk	ypk	ypk	Yupik languages	
sit:zhx	zhx		Chinese (family)	Chinese (zh/zho/chi) is a macrolanguage covered by this collection code
ine:sla:zle	zle		East Slavic languages	
ine:sla:zls	zls		South Slavic languages	
ine:sla:zlw	zlw		West Slavic languages	
nic:alv:znd	znd	znd	Zande languages	Zande (individual language) (zne) is an individual language covered by this collection code

== Relationship to other parts of ISO 639 ==
Some of the codes in ISO 639-5 codes are also found in the ISO 639-2 "Alpha-3 code" standard. ISO 639-2 contains codes for some individual languages, some ISO 639 macrolanguage codes, and some collective codes; any code found in ISO 639-2 is also found in either ISO 639-3 or ISO 639-5.

Languages, families, or group codes in ISO 639-2 can be of type "group" (g) or "remainder group" (r). A "group" consists of several related languages; a "remainder group" is a group of several related languages from which some specific languages have been excluded. However, in ISO 639-5, the "remainder groups" do not exclude any languages. Because ISO 639-2 and ISO 639-5 use the same Alpha-3 codes, but do not always refer to the same list of languages for any given code, the languages an Alpha-3 code refers to can not be determined unless it is known whether the code is used in the context of ISO 639-2 or ISO 639-5.

Examples of ISO 639-2 and ISO 639-5 code relationships
Alpha-3 code	ISO 639-2 type	ISO 639-2 definition	ISO 639-5 definition
afa	remainder group (r)	Afro-Asiatic languages	all Afro-Asiatic languages
alg	normal group (g)	all Algonquian languages	all Algonquian languages
sqj	not defined	not defined	Albanian languages

== History ==
The committee draft of ISO 639-5 was issued on February 23, 2005. Voting on the draft terminated on July 5, 2005; the draft was approved.

In 2006, the target publication date for the final standard was set at October 30, 2007. During the approval stage for the standard, the ISO final draft international standard ballot was not initiated until February 8, 2008. Voting ended on April 10, 2008 ("stage 50.60").

The standard was published on May 15, 2008.

Updates were made in August 2008, February 2009, and February 2013.
