= ISO 639-3 =

International standard for three-letter codes identifying languages

ISO 639-3:2007, Codes for the representation of names of languages – Part 3: Alpha-3 code for comprehensive coverage of languages, is an international standard for language codes in the ISO 639 series. It defines three-letter codes for identifying languages. The standard was published by International Organization for Standardization (ISO) on 1 February 2007.

As of 2023, this edition of the standard has been officially withdrawn and replaced by ISO 639:2023.

ISO 639-3 extends the ISO 639-2 alpha-3 codes with an aim to cover all known natural languages. The extended language coverage was based primarily on the language codes used in the Ethnologue (volumes 10–14) published by SIL International, which is now the registration authority for ISO 639-3. It provides an enumeration of languages as complete as possible, including living and extinct, ancient and constructed, major and minor, written and unwritten. However, it does not include reconstructed languages such as Proto-Indo-European.

ISO 639-3 is intended for use as metadata codes in a wide range of applications. It is widely used in computer and information systems, such as the Internet, in which many languages need to be supported. In archives and other information storage, it is used in cataloging systems, indicating what language a resource is in or about. The codes are also frequently used in the linguistic literature and elsewhere to compensate for the fact that language names may be obscure or ambiguous.

Find a language
Enter an ISO 639-3 code to find the corresponding language article.

== Language codes ==
ISO 639-3 includes all languages in ISO 639-1 and all individual languages in ISO 639-2. ISO 639-1 and ISO 639-2 focused on major languages, most frequently represented in the total body of the world's literature. Since ISO 639-2 also includes language collections and Part 3 does not, ISO 639-3 is not a superset of ISO 639-2. Where B and T codes exist in ISO 639-2, ISO 639-3 uses the T-codes.

Example ISO language codes
Language	639-1	639-2 (B/T)	639-3 type	639-3 code
English	en	eng	individual	eng
French	fr	fre/fra	individual	fra
German	de	ger/deu	individual	deu
Arabic	ar	ara	macro	ara
Standard Arabic	ar	ara	individual	arb
Masri	ar	ara	individual	arz
Shami	ar	ara	individual	apc
Gilit Arabic	ar	ara	individual	acm
Chinese	zh	chi/zho	macro	zho
Mandarin	zh	chi/zho	individual	cmn
Cantonese	zh	chi/zho	individual	yue
Southern Min	zh	chi/zho	individual	nan
Central Thai	th	tha	individual	tha
Southern Thai	th	tha	individual	sou
Northern Thai	th	tha	individual	nod
Lue	th	tha	individual	khb
Lao/Isan	lo	lao	individual	lao/tts
Phu Thai	lo	lao	individual	pht

As of 23 January 2023, the standard contains 7,916 entries. The inventory of languages is based on a number of sources including: the individual languages contained in 639-2, modern languages from the Ethnologue, historic varieties, ancient languages and artificial languages from the Linguist List, as well as languages recommended within the annual public commenting period.

Machine-readable data files are provided by the registration authority. Mappings from ISO 639-1 or ISO 639-2 to ISO 639-3 can be done using these data files.

ISO 639-3 is intended to assume distinctions based on criteria that are not entirely objective. It is not intended to document or provide identifiers for dialects or other sub-language variations. Nevertheless, judgments regarding distinctions between languages may be subjective, particularly in the case of language varieties without established literary traditions, usage in education or media, or other factors that contribute to language conventionalization. Therefore, the standard should not be regarded as an authoritative statement of what distinct languages exist in the world (about which there may be substantial disagreement in some cases), but rather simply one useful way for identifying different language varieties precisely.

== Code space ==
Since the code is three-letter alphabetic, one upper bound for the number of languages that can be represented is 26 × 26 × 26 = 17,576. Since ISO 639-2 defines special codes (4), a reserved range (520) and B-only codes (22), 546 codes cannot be used in part 3. Therefore, a stricter upper bound is 17,576 − 546 = 17,030.

The upper bound gets even stricter if one subtracts the language collections defined in 639-2 and the ones yet to be defined in ISO 639-5.

== Reference names ==
Reference names may only use a subset of ASCII characters. According to section 6.4.1 of the standard, they may only contain the 26 letters of the ISO basic Latin alphabet and diacritics from the following set:

á é í ó ú
â ê î ô û
à è ì ò ù
ä ë ï ö ü
ã ñ õ
å
ç

Reference names may also include any of five ASCII punctuation marks (space, hyphen-minus, apostrophe and the parentheses), and within parentheses the full stop and the ten digits.

Alternative names may use proper language orthography, if Latin, or transliteration into Latin script that contains additional characters.

== Macrolanguages ==
There are 58 languages in ISO 639-2 which are considered, for the purposes of the standard, to be "macrolanguages" in ISO 639-3.

Some of these macrolanguages had no individual language as defined by ISO 639-3 in the code set of ISO 639-2, e.g. ara (Generic Arabic). Others like nor (Norwegian) had their two individual parts (nno (Nynorsk), nob (Bokmål)) already in ISO 639-2.

That means some languages (e.g. arb, Standard Arabic) that were considered by ISO 639-2 to be dialects of one language (ara) are now in ISO 639-3 in certain contexts considered to be individual languages themselves.

This is an attempt to deal with varieties that may be linguistically distinct from each other, but are treated by their speakers as two forms of the same language, e.g. in cases of diglossia.

For example:

- ara (Generic Arabic, 639-2)
- arb (Standard Arabic, 639-3)

A complete list is available on the ISO 639-3 registrar's website.

== Collective languages ==
"A collective language code element is an identifier that represents a group of individual languages that are not deemed to be one language in any usage context." These codes do not precisely represent a particular language or macrolanguage.

While ISO 639-2 includes three-letter identifiers for collective languages, these codes are excluded from ISO 639-3. Hence ISO 639-3 is not a superset of ISO 639-2.

ISO 639-5 defines 3-letter collective codes for language families and groups, including the collective language codes from ISO 639-2.

== Special codes ==
Four codes are set aside in ISO 639-2 and ISO 639-3 for cases where none of the specific codes are appropriate. These are intended primarily for applications like databases where an ISO code is required regardless of whether one exists.

- mis (uncoded languages, originally an abbreviation for 'miscellaneous') is intended for languages which have not (yet) been included in the ISO standard.
- mul (multiple languages) is intended for cases where the data includes more than one language, and (for example) the database requires a single ISO code.
- und (undetermined) is intended for cases where the language in the data has not been identified, such as when it is mislabeled or never had been labeled. It is not intended for cases such as Trojan where an unattested language has been given a name.
- zxx (no linguistic content / not applicable) is intended for data which is not a language at all, such as animal calls.

In addition, 520 codes in the range qaa–qtz are 'reserved for local use'. For example, Rebecca Bettencourt assigns a code to constructed languages, and new assignments are made upon request.

== Maintenance processes ==
The code table for ISO 639-3 is open to changes. In order to protect stability of existing usage, the changes permitted are limited to:

- modifications to the reference information for an entry (including names or categorizations for type and scope),
- addition of new entries,
- deprecation of entries that are duplicates or spurious,
- merging one or more entries into another entry, and
- splitting an existing language entry into multiple new language entries.

The code assigned to a language is not changed unless there is also a change in denotation.

Changes are made according to an annual cycle. Every request is given a minimum period of three months for public review.

The ISO 639-3 Web site has pages that describe "scopes of denotation" (languoid types) and types of languages, which explain what concepts are in scope for encoding and certain criteria that need to be met. For example, constructed languages can be encoded, but only if they are designed for human communication and have a body of literature, preventing requests for idiosyncratic inventions.

The registration authority documents on its Web site instructions made in the text of the ISO 639-3 standard regarding how the code tables are to be maintained. It also documents the processes used for receiving and processing change requests.

A change request form is provided, and there is a second form for collecting information about proposed additions. Any party can submit change requests. When submitted, requests are initially reviewed by the registration authority for completeness.

When a fully documented request is received, it is added to a published Change Request Index. Also, announcements are sent to the general LINGUIST discussion list at Linguist List and other lists the registration authority may consider relevant, inviting public review and input on the requested change. Any list owner or individual is able to request notifications of change requests for particular regions or language families. Comments that are received are published for other parties to review. Based on consensus in comments received, a change request may be withdrawn or promoted to "candidate status".

Three months prior to the end of an annual review cycle (typically in September), an announcement is sent to the LINGUIST discussion list and other lists regarding Candidate Status Change Requests. All requests remain open for review and comment through the end of the annual review cycle.

Decisions are announced at the end of the annual review cycle (typically in January). At that time, requests may be adopted in whole or in part, amended and carried forward into the next review cycle, or rejected. Rejections often include suggestions on how to modify proposals for resubmission. A public archive of every change request is maintained along with the decisions taken and the rationale for the decisions.

== Criticism ==
Linguists Morey, Post and Friedman raise various criticisms of ISO 639, and in particular ISO 639-3:

- The three-letter codes themselves are problematic, because while officially arbitrary technical labels, they are often derived from mnemonic abbreviations for language names, some of which are pejorative. For example, Yemsa was assigned the code jnj, from pejorative "Janejero". These codes may thus be considered offensive by native speakers.
- The administration of the standard is problematic because SIL is a missionary organization with inadequate transparency and accountability. Decisions as to what deserves to be encoded as a language are made internally. While outside input may or may not be welcomed, the decisions themselves are opaque, and many linguists have given up trying to improve the standard.
- Permanent identification of a language is incompatible with language change.
- Languages and dialects often cannot be rigorously distinguished, and dialect continua may be subdivided in many ways, whereas the standard privileges one choice. Such distinctions are often based instead on social and political factors.
- ISO 639-3 may be misunderstood and misused by authorities that make decisions about people's identity and language, abolishing the right of speakers to identify or not to identify with their speech variety. Though SIL is sensitive to such issues, this problem is inherent in the nature of an established standard, which may be used (or mis-used) in ways that ISO and SIL do not intend.

Martin Haspelmath agrees with four of these points, but not the point about language change. He disagrees because any account of a language requires identifying it, and we can easily identify different stages of a language. He suggests that linguists may prefer to use a codification that is made at the languoid level since "it rarely matters to linguists whether what they are talking about is a language, a dialect or a close-knit family of languages." He also questions whether an ISO standard for language identification is appropriate since ISO is an industrial organization, while he views language documentation and nomenclature as a scientific endeavor. He cites the original need for standardized language identifiers as having been "the economic significance of translation and software localization", for which purposes the ISO 639-1 and 639-2 standards were established. But he raises doubts about industry need for the comprehensive coverage provided by ISO 639-3, including as it does "little-known languages of small communities that are never or hardly used in writing and that are often in danger of extinction".

== Usage ==
- Ethnologue
- Linguist List
- OLAC: the Open Languages Archive Community
- Microsoft Windows 8: Supports all codes in ISO 639-3 at the time of release.
- Wikimedia Foundation: New language-based projects (e.g. Wikipedias in new languages) must have an identifier from ISO 639-1, -2, or -3.
- Other standards that rely on ISO 639-3:
  - Language tags as defined by the Internet Engineering Task Force (IETF), as documented in:
    - BCP 47: Best Current Practice 47, which includes RFC 5646
    - RFC 5646, which superseded RFC 4646, which superseded RFC 3066. (Therefore, all standards which depend on any of these 3 IETF standards now use ISO 639-3.)
  - The ePub 3.0 standard for language metadata uses Dublin Core Metadata elements. These language metadata elements in ePubs must contain valid RFC 5646 codes for languages. RFC5646 points to ISO 639-3 for languages without shorter IANA codes.
  - Dublin Core Metadata Initiative: DCMI Metadata Term for language, via IETF's RFC 4646 (now superseded by RFC 5646).
  - Internet Assigned Numbers Authority (IANA) The W3C's internationalization effort recommends the use of the IANA Language Subtag Registry for selecting codes for languages. The IANA Language Subtag Registry depends on ISO 639-3 codes for languages which did not previously have codes in other parts of the ISO 639 standard.
  - HTML5: via IETF's BCP 47.
  - XML: via IETF's BCP 47.
  - SVG: via IETF's BCP 47.
  - MODS library codes: Incorporates IETF's RFC 3066 (now superseded by RFC 5646).
  - Text Encoding Initiative (TEI): via IETF's BCP 47.
  - Lexical Markup Framework: ISO specification for representation of machine-readable dictionaries.
  - Unicode's Common locale data repository: Uses several hundred codes from ISO 639-3 not included in ISO 639-2.
