= Infoterm =

- Formation: 1971
- Type: GO, NGO
- Headquarters: Vienna (Austria)
- Official language: English, French, German
- President: Albina Auksoriūtė
- Website: www.infoterm.info

The International Information Centre for Terminology (Infoterm) was founded in 1971 by UNESCO. Its goal is "to support and co-ordinate international co-operation in the field of terminology." Infoterm members are national, international and regional institutions, organizations, networks and specialized public, semi-public or other non-profit institutions engaged in devising and standardizing terminology. Members are drawn from Africa, the Americas, Asia and Europe.

== History ==
Since the early 1930s in Wieselburg, Austria, industrialist Eugen Wüster led a private centre studying terminology as part of his engineering firm. His research on international technical communication resulted in the 1936 founding of the Technical Committee for Terminology Standardization of the International Organization for Standardization (ISO/TC 37). During the 1950s and 1960s Wüster formulated a general theory of terminology and was a pioneer of terminological standardization. In 1951 the Austrian Standards International (ASI) made Wüster general secretary responsible for its terminology principles and coordination efforts (the ISO/TC 37 technical committee).

As a result of his pioneering activity, in 1971 UNESCO signed a contract with ASI establishing Infoterm as an international organization; from that year until 2008 Infoterm would assume guidance of the secretariat that Wüster had led for its first 20 years. After Wüster's death in 1977, his fame as the father of terminology science gained widespread currency, and Infoterm took control of his legacy in 1982. In 1996 Infoterm became an independent international non-profit scientific association and established the Eugen Wüster Archive at the University of Vienna.

== Infoterm activities ==
Infoterm aims to coordinate terminological cooperation internationally to facilitate subject-area communication and knowledge exchange, enabling all who are active in a particular field to participate. Its main areas of action are international collaboration on terminology, terminology policy, legal aspects of terminology data (copyright), theory and methodology of structured content (terminology database management) and terminological standardization.

== Eugen Wüster Prize ==
From 1997, Infoterm began awarding the Eugen Wüster Prize to recognize outstanding performance in the field of terminology.

Prize winners have included:

- 2018: Gerhard Budin (Austria)
- 2016: Basey Antia (Nigeria)
- 2014: Kei-Sun Choi (Korea)
- 2010: Sue Ellen Wright (USA) and Klaus-Dirk Schmitz (Germany)
- 2007: Alan K. Melby (USA) and Maria Teresa Cabré (Spain)
- 2004: Robert Dubuc (Canada) and Amelia de Irazazabal Nerpell (Spain)
- 2001: Juan C. Sager (United Kingdom)
- 1998: Christer Laurén (Finland)
- 1997: Heribert Picht (Denmark)

== Infoterm and the ISO ==
Infoterm is represented on ten committees or subcommittees of the International Organization for Standardization:

- ISO/IEC JTC 1 and its subcommittees JTC 1/SC 32 and JTC 1/SC 36
- TC 12 and TC 46/SC 4
- ISO/TC 37 and its subcommittees TC 37/SC 1, TC 37/SC 2, TC 37/SC 3 and TC 37/SC 4

== Infoterm and Esperanto ==
Since 1988 Infoterm has maintained regular contact with the Esperanto world through Terminologia Esperanto-Centro, the terminology centre of the World Esperanto Association, known by its Esperanto initials UEA. After many years of friendly relations, the UEA joined Infoterm as an associate member in May 2011 with the signing of a co-operation agreement. Goals include exchanging information, mutual support and joint activities for projects, meetings, publications and so on, especially in the field of terminology.
