= Multigraph (disambiguation) =

A multigraph is a mathematical graph where some pairs of vertices are connected by more than one edge.

Multigraph may also refer to:

- Multigraph (orthography), a sequence of letters that behaves as a unit and is not the sum of its parts
- Multigraph (programming), a sequence of characters that appear in source code which should be treated as if they were a single character
