= Bua languages =

Language subgroup

Bua
- Geographic distribution: southern Chad
- Linguistic classification: Niger–Congo?: Atlantic–Congo; Volta-Congo; Savannas; Mbum–Day; Bua

Language codes
- Glottolog: adam1257

The Bua languages are a subgroup of the Mbum–Day subgroup of the Savanna languages spoken by fewer than 30,000 people in southern Chad in an area stretching roughly between the Chari River and the Guéra Massif. They were labeled "G13" in Joseph Greenberg's Adamawa language-family proposal. They are ultimately part of the Niger–Congo family, and have exerted a significant influence on Laal.

Bua languages have had extensive contact with Chadic languages.

== Languages ==
The Bua languages include:

- Bua language (7,708 speakers in 1993), north of the Chari River around Korbol and Gabil (after which the group was named); mutually comprehensible with Fanian.
- Fanian, or Mana, or Kobe (> 1,100 speakers in 1997), in the villages of Mouraye, Sengué, Malakonjo, Rim, Sisi, Karo west of Lake Iro.
- Niellim or Lua (5,157 speakers in 1993), spoken around Niellim and Niou along the Chari River north of Sarh (including the extinct Chini dialect)
- Tunia (2,255 speakers in 1993), around Sarh (including the extinct Perim dialect)
- Noy or Loo (36 speakers in 1993), spoken in Bedaya, Balimba, Djoli, Koumra, and Koumogo south of Sarh. Nearly extinct.
- Gula languages:
  - Gula Iro or Kulaal (3,500 speakers in 1991), around Lake Iro.
  - Zan Gula (4,000 speakers in 1997), around Zan and Chinguil.
  - Bon Gula (> 1,200 speakers in 1997), in the villages of Bon and Ibir.
- Koke (600 speakers in 1993), around Daguela
- Bolgo (1,800 speakers in 1993), near Melfi, in Koya, Boli, Gagne, and Bedi.

The first to note the similarity between Bua and Niellim in print was Gustav Nachtigal, in 1889. Maurice Gaudefroy-Demombynes added Tunia and "Mana" (possibly an alternate name for Fanian) in 1907, forming a "Groupe Boa". Johannes Lukas (1937) likewise described a "Bua-Gruppe" consisting of Bua, Niellim, and Koke, and in Joseph Greenberg's 1963 classification The Languages of Africa, the three languages were placed together in the Adamawa subphylum as a group named Adamawa-13. Later, Pairault (1965, 1969) added the more northerly Gula languages, Fanian, Koke, and Bolgo, allowing Samarin (1971) to define roughly the current membership of the Bua languages/Adamawa-13. Palayer later added Noy.

A full list of Bua languages from Boyeldieu, et al. (2018:55-56) is given below.

Language	Alternate names	Self-designation	Locations	Number of speakers
Lua	Niellim, Nielim	luāà	Niellim, Niou, Sarh	5,000
Cini		ci᷅nī	Niellim	extinct
Tun	Tounia, Tunya	tǔn	Sarh	2,000
Perim		pèrìm	surroundings of Niellim	extinct
Lɔɔ	Noy	lɔ́ɔ̄	Bédaya, Djoli, Balimba, Koumogo Koumra	extinct
Kulaal	Goula d’Iro, Gula Iro	glossonym: kùláál	Masidjanga, Boum Kabir, Tiéou, Tiolé Kabir	3,500
Bon Gula (Goula de Bon)	Eeni		Bon, Ibir	1,200
Zan Gula (Goula de Zan)	Moraj	glossonym: More or Morre [mɔrrɛ]	Zan, Chinguil	3,200
Ɓa	Boua, Boa, Bua	ɓà	Korbol, Lagouaye, Nyamko, Tigli, Tim, Bar, Sakre Deleb, Malbom, Ladon and, more to the North, an isolated group in Gabil	8,000
Korom/Kawãwãy			Bar, Sarabara, Sakré Deleb, Tilé Nougar	60
Fanya	Fanian	fãỹa	Karo, Ataway, Tilé Nougar, Timan, Sisi, Rim	1,000
Tereu	Bolgo Dugag	tērēù, glossonym: tērēùnī	Aloa (IGN Alouna?), Niagara (IGN Niakra?), Koya, Boli	1,000
Bolgo proper	Bolgo Kubar	bólgò, glossonym: bólgònî	Agrap, Gagne, Bedi, Moulouk, Hari, Kodbo	1,800 (Bolgo proper and Bormo)
Bormo	Bolgo Kubar	bòrmó, glossonym: bòrmónì	Agrap, Gagne, Bedi, Moulouk, Hari, Kodbo	1,800 (Bolgo proper and Bormo)
Koke	Khoke		Daguéla, Chobo	600

== Classification ==
Kastenholz's (2017:2) preliminary classification divides the Bua languages into a Riverine group and an Inland group.

- Bua
  - Riverine
    - Tun
    - Ɓa, Lua
  - Inland
    - Koke, Bolgo
    - Gula
      - Bon Gula
      - nuclear Gula
        - Zan Gula
        - Fãya, Kulaal

== Linguistic features ==
All of these languages are tonal, with distinctive vowel length and nasal vowels in limited contexts. Most of these languages have lost the typical Niger–Congo noun class system (Goula Iro appears to have retained it to some degree.) However, its former presence is betrayed by their quite complicated system of plural formation, combining internal ablaut with changes to final consonants and/or suffixation.

== See also ==
- List of Proto-Bua reconstructions (Wiktionary)

== Bibliography ==
=== General relevance ===
- Pascal Boyeldieu and C. Seignobos, "Contribution à l'étude du pays niellim (Moyen-Chari–Tchad)", L'homme et le milieu, Aspects du développement au Tchad, N'Djamena, "Annales de l'Universite du Tchad", Série: Lettres, Langues vivantes et Sciences humaines, no. 3, 1975, pp. 67–98. Includes an 80-word comparative list for Niellim and three Tunia varieties, with some remarks on regular correspondences
- P. Boyeldieu. "Présentation sommaire du groupe boua, Tchad (Adamawa 13 de J.H. Greenberg)", pp. 275–286, in: Colloques et séminaires: Le Milieu et les Hommes. Recherches comparatives et historiques dans la bassin du lac Tchad. Actes du 2ème colloque Méga-Tchad ORSTOM BONDY, le 3 et 4 octobre 1985. Ministère française de la Coopération & MESRES Cameroun, 1985.
- P. Boyeldieu, "vestiges de suffixes des classes nominales dans les langues du groupe boua (Tchad, Adamawa-13 de J. H. Greenberg)" – Current Approaches to African Linguistics, vol. 2 (J. Kaye, H. Koopman, D. Sportiche and A. Dugas, eds.) – Dordrecht/Cinnaminson, Foris Publications, pp. 3–15.
- P. Boyeldieu & C. Seignobos, Contribution à l'étude du pays niellim, Université du Tchad / INTSH, N'djamena, 1974. Includes word lists for Kwa Tchini (Niellim dialect) and Kwa Perim (Tunia dialect).
- P. Boyeldieu. "Vestiges de suffixes de classes nominales dans les langues du groupe boua (Tchad, Adamawa-13 de J.H. Greenberg)" in Current Approaches to African Linguistics (Actes du 13ème Colloque Annuel de Linguistique Africaniste, Montréal, Canada). Dordrecht: Foris Publications, 1983, p. 3-15. Coll. Publications in African languages and linguistics.
- M. Gaudefroy-Demombynes, Documents sur les langues de l'Oubangui-Chari, Paris, 1907. Includes (pp. 107–122) a 200-word comparative list of Bua, Niellim, Fanian, and Tunia, with a brief grammar and some phrases collected by Decorse.
- A. Joly, Le canton de Boli, 1935, N'djamena archives W-52/19. Contains some 200 Fanian and Bolgo words (pp. 43–50.)
- J. Lukas, Zentralsudanisches Studien, Hamburg, Friedrichsen, de Gruyter & Cie, 1937. Gives the wordlists of Nachtigal, zu Mecklenburg, Barth, and Gaudefroy-Demombynes for Bua (~400 words), Niellim (~200 words), and Koke (~100 words).
- P. Palayer, "Notes sur les Noy du Moyen-Chari (Tchad)", Les langues du groupe Boua, N'djamena, I.N.S.H., "Etudes et documents tchadiens", Série C (Linguistique), no. 2, pp. 196–219. Elements of Noy, plus a 50-word comparative list of Noy, Niellim (2 dialects), Tunia, Iro Gula.
- Gen. de Rendinger, "Contribution à l'étude des langues nègres du Centre Africain", Journal de la Société des Africanistes, XIX-II, 1949, pp. 143–194. Includes examples and grammatical information on Bolgo varieties and Zan Gula.
- A. N. Tucker & M. A. Bryan, The Non-Bantu Languages of North-Eastern Africa, Handbook of African Languages, part III, Oxford University Press for International African Institute, 1956. Includes an over-inclusive list of Bua languages, a grammatical summary of Bua, Tunia, and Niellim based on existing fieldwork, and a brief comparative wordlist for Day.

=== Specific languages ===
See Niellim, Gula Iro for works on those languages.

- P. A. Benton, Languages and Peoples of Bornu Vol. I, Frank Cass & Co:London 1912 (1st ed.)/1968 (2nd ed.) Gives Barth's unpublished vocabulary of Bua on pp. 78–130.
- P. Boyeldieu, La langue lua ("niellim") (Groupe Boua – Moyen-Chari, Tchad) Phonologie – Morphologie – Dérivation verbale. Descriptions des langues et monographes ethnologuistiques, 1. Cambridge University Press & Editions de la Maison des Sciences de l'Homme for SELAF. Paris 1985. ISBN 0-521-27069-3 (CUP). (A major source for this bibliography.)
- Faris, David and Marba Meundeung. 1993. Etude sociolinguistique de la langue bon goula. SIL Chad. Includes wordlist.
- J. Mouchet, "Contribution à l'étude du Gula (Tchad)", Bulletin de l'IFAN, vol. XX, series B, no. 3-4, 1958, pp. 593–611. On Bon Gula.
- P. Palayer, Esquisse phonologique du Tounia, INSH, 1974 (?).
