= Moyen-Chari (region) =

Region of Chad

Coordinates: 9°08′46″N 18°23′03″E

Moyen-Chari شاري الأوسط
- Region
- Map of Chad showing Moyen-Chari.
- Country: Chad
- Departments: 3
- Sub-prefectures: 18
- Regional capital: Sarh

Population (2009)
  - Total: 588,008
- Time zone: UTC+01:00 (WAT)

Moyen-Chari (Arabic: شاري الأوسط) is one of the 23 regions of Chad, located in the south of the country. Its capital is Sarh. The former prefecture of the same name was larger and included modern Mandoul Region.

== Geography ==
The region borders Guéra Region to the north, Salamat Region to the east, the Central African Republic to the south, and Mandoul Region, Tandjilé Region and Chari-Baguirmi to the west. The region is largely flat savannah, with parts of the region protected as part of the Manda National Park. Lake Iro, a suspected impact crater, is located in the north-east.

=== Settlements ===
The capital of Moyen-Chari is Sarh, the third largest city in Chad; other major settlements include Alako, Balimba, Baltoubaye, Bohobé, Boum Kebbir, Danamadji, Dindjebo, Djéké Djéké, Korbol, Koumogo, Kounou, Kyabé, Maro, Moussa Foyo, Ngondeye, Roro and Singako

== Demographics ==
As per the 2009 Chadian census, the region's population was 588,008 inhabitants. The main ethnolinguistic groups are Arab groups such as the Baggara (generally speaking Chadian Arabic), Bagirmi, Boor, Bua, Gula groups such as the Gula Iro and Zan Gula, Kaba groups (speaking language such as Kaba Deme, Kaba Náà and Kulfa), Laal, Lutos, Ndam, Niellim, Sara, Tumak and Tunia.

== Economy ==
Its economy is based on subsistence agriculture, breeding, cotton and sugarcane.

== Subdivisions ==
The region of Moyen-Chari is divided into three departments:

Department	Capital	Sub-prefectures
Barh Köh	Sarh	Sarh, Korbol, Koumogo, Moussa Foyo, Balimba
Grande Sido	Maro	Maro, Danamadji, Djéké Djéké, Sido
Lac Iro	Kyabé	Kyabé, Bohobé, Boum Kebbir, Ngondeye, Roro, Baltoubaye, Dindjebo, Alako, Singako
