= List of universities in Chad =

This is a list of universities in Chad.

== Public universities ==
- Adam Barka University of Abeché, Abeche
- University of N'Djamena, N'Djamena
- University of Moundou, Moundou
- University of Doba, Doba

== Private universities ==
- Saint Charles Lwanga University of Sarh, Sarh
