= Laal language =

Language isolate spoken in Chad

Laal
- yəw láàl
- Native to: Chad
- Region: Gori, Damtar, Mailao villages in Moyen-Chari prefecture
- Native speakers: (750 cited 2000)
- Language family: Language isolate
- Dialects: Gori; Laabe

Language codes
- ISO 639-3: gdm
- Glottolog: laal1242
- ELP: Laal
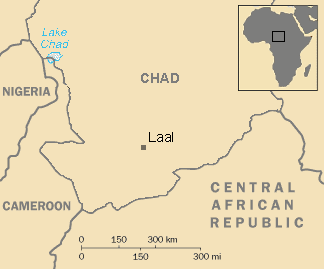
- Location within Chad where the Laal language is spoken

Laal is an endangered language isolate spoken by 750 people (as of 2025) in two villages in the Moyen-Chari prefecture of Chad on opposite banks of the Chari River, called Gori (lá), and Damtar (ɓual). It represents an isolated survival of an earlier language group of Central Africa. It is unwritten except in transcription by linguists. According to former Summer Institute of Linguistics-Chad member David Faris, it is in danger of extinction, with most people under 25 shifting to the locally more widespread Bagirmi.

This language first came to the attention of academic linguists in 1977 through Pascal Boyeldieu's fieldwork in 1975 and 1978. His fieldwork was based, for the most part, on a single speaker, Djouam Kadi of Damtar.

== Speakers and status ==
The language's speakers are mainly river fishermen and farmers, who also sell salt extracted from the ashes of doum palms and Vossia cuspidata. Like their neighbours, the Niellim, they were formerly cattle herders but lost their herds around the turn of the 19th century. They are mainly Muslims, but until the latter half of the 20th century, they followed the traditional Yondo religion of the Niellim. The area is fairly undeveloped; while there are Qur'anic schools in Gori and Damtar, the nearest government school is 7 km away, and there is no medical dispensary in the region (as of 1995).

The village of Damtar formerly had a distinct dialect, called Laabe (la:bé), with two or three speakers remaining in 1977; it was replaced by the dialect of Gori after two Gori families fled there at the end of the 19th century to escape a war. No other dialects of Laal are known.

Under Chadian law, Laal, like all languages of Chad other than French and Arabic, is regarded as a national language. Although the 1996 Constitution stipulates that "the law shall fix the conditions of promotion and development of national languages", national languages are not used for education, for official purposes, or usually for written media, but some of the larger ones (but not Laal) are used on the radio.

== Classification ==
Laal remains unclassified, although extensive Adamawa (specifically Bua) and to a lesser extent Chadic influence is found. It is sometimes grouped with one of those two language families, and sometimes seen as a language isolate. Boyeldieu (1982) summarizes his view as "its classification remains problematic; while it shows certain lexical, and no doubt morphological, traits with the Bua languages (Adamawa-13, Niger–Congo family of Joseph H. Greenberg), it differs from them radically in many ways of which some, a priori, make one think of geographically nearby Chadic languages." Roger Blench (2003), similarly, considers that "its vocabulary and morphology seem to be partly drawn from Chadic (i.e. Afro-Asiatic), partly from Adamawa (i.e. Niger–Congo) and partly from an unknown source, perhaps its original phylum, a now-vanished grouping from Central Africa." It is the last possibility which attracts particular interest; if this proves true, Laal may be the only remaining window on the linguistic state of Central Africa before the expansion of the main African language families - Afro-Asiatic, Nilo-Saharan, and Niger-Congo - into it.

Their immediate neighbors speak Bua, Niellim, and Ndam. Laal contains a number of loanwords from Baguirmi, which for several centuries was the lingua franca of the region under the Baguirmi Empire, and perhaps a dozen Chadic roots, which are not similar to the Chadic languages that currently neighbor Laal. In addition, almost all Laal speak Niellim as a second language, and 20%–30% of their vocabulary is cognate with Niellim, especially agricultural vocabulary (Boyeldieu 1977, Lionnet 2010). Like the Baguirmi, the Laal are Muslims; partly because of this, some Arabic loanwords are also found. However some 60% of the vocabulary, including most core vocabulary, cannot be identified with any known language family (Lionnet 2010). Indeed, some of the words cognate with Niellim, including some basic vocabulary, is not cognate with closely related Bua, suggesting that these are not Adamawa roots but loans in Niellim from the Laal substrate (Lionnet 2010). Pozdniakov (2010) believes Laal is a distinct branch of Niger–Congo with part of its pronominal system borrowed from a Chadic language like Kera.

Laal is grouped with the Chadic languages in an automated computational analysis (ASJP 4) by Müller et al. (2013), suggesting early contact with Chadic.

== Phonology ==
The sounds of Laal are transcribed here using International Phonetic Alphabet symbols.

=== Consonants ===
		Bilabial	Alveolar	Palatal	Velar	Glottal
Stop	voiceless	p	t	c	k	ʔ
Stop	plain voiced	b	d	ɟ	ɡ	
Stop	prenasalized	ᵐb	ⁿd	ᶮɟ	ᵑɡ	
Stop	implosive	ɓ	ɗ	ʄ		
Fricative			s			h
Nasal		m	n	ɲ	ŋ	
Approximant			l	j	w	
Flap			ɾ			

Implosives and prenasalised stops as well as /h/ are found only word-initially. Voiceless stops as well as /s/ cannot occur at the end of a syllable. /ŋ/ occurs only intervocalically and word-finally. /s/ appears exclusively in loanwords and certain numbers. Prenasalized stops as well as the implosive /ʄ/ are extremely rare.

=== Vowels ===
The vowel system for non-initial syllables is /i/, /y/, /ɨ/, /u/, /e/, /ə/, /o/, /a/ and the diphthong /ua/, with no length distinction. /y/ is heard as a glide [ɥ] in the vowel sequences /yo, ya/ as [ɥo, ɥa]. For initial syllables, however, it is much more complicated, allowing length distinctions and distinguishing the following additional diphthongs: /ia/, /yo/, /ya/ (but the latter two appear only as morphologically conditioned forms of /e/ and /ia/ and so are perhaps better seen as allophonic).

In addition, /y/ may occur very occasionally; Boyeldieu quotes the example of mỳlùg (plural form of 'red').

There are three level tones: high (á), mid (a), low (à). Combinations may occur on a single vowel, resulting in phonetic rising and falling tone, and which are phonemically sequences of level tones. Such cases are transcribed here by repeating the vowel (e.g. àá); long vowels are indicated only by a colon (e.g., a:).

Suffixes may force any of four kinds of ablaut on the vowels of preceding words: raising (takes /ia/, /a/, /ua/ to [ɛ], [ə], [ɔ]), lowering (takes /e/, /ə/, /o/ to [ia], [a], [ua]), low rounding (takes /i/ and /ɨ/ to [u]; /e/ and /ia/ to [ɥo]; /ə/, /a/, and /ua/ to [o]), and high rounding (takes /i/ and /ɨ/ to [u]; /e/ and /ia/ to [ɥa]; /ə/, /a/, and /o/ to [ua]). They are transcribed in the suffix section as ↑, ↓, ↗, ↘ respectively. In some verbs, a/ə is "raised" to [e] rather than, as expected, to [ə].

In suffixes, ə and o undergo vowel harmony: they become ɨ and u respectively if the preceding vowel is one of {i, ɨ, u}. Likewise, r undergoes consonant harmony, becoming l after words containing l. Suffixes with a neutral tone copy the final tone of the word to which they are suffixed.

Vowels
	Front	Central	Back
Close	i y	ɨ	u
Mid	e	ə	o
Open		a	

== Morphology ==
=== Syntax ===
The typical word order can be summarised as subject–(verbal particle)–verb–object–adverb; preposition–noun; possessed–possessor; noun–adjective. Nouns can be fronted when topicalized. See the sample sentences below for examples and the conjunctions for clause syntax.

=== Nouns ===
Nouns have plural and singular forms (the latter are perhaps better viewed as singulative in some cases), with plural formation hard to predict: kò:g ('bone') → kuagmi ('bones'), tuà:r ('chicken') → tò:rò ('chickens'), ɲaw ('hunger') → ɲə̀wə́r ('hungers'). Nouns do not have arbitrary gender, but three natural genders (male, female, non-human) are distinguished by pronouns.

The possessive is expressed in two ways:

- Inalienable, or direct, possession: by following the possessed with the possessor (and modifying the tone or ending of the possessed in some cases): piá:r no ('person's leg', lit. 'leg person');
- Alienable possession: by putting a connecting word, conjugated according to number and gender, between the possessed and the possessor:

làgɨˋm má màr-dɨb
horse CONN man+of-forge
'blacksmith's horse'

The connecting word is sometimes abbreviated to a simple high tone.

However, if the possessor is a pronoun, it is suffixed with extensive vowel ablaut (in the first case) or prepositional forms with "at" and optionally the connector as well, are used (in the second case): na:ra ɟá ɗe: ('my man', lit. 'man CONN. at-me'), mùlù ('her eye', lit. 'eye-her'; from mɨla, 'eye'). Some nouns, such as páw- ('friend') occur only with bound pronouns and have no independent form. That is called obligatory possession and is found in many other language, usually for words referring to personal relationships. See pronouns for the relevant suffixes.

A noun indicating someone who does, is, or has something can be formed with the prefix màr, meaning roughly 'he/she/it who/of': màr jùgòr ('landowner'), màr ce ('farmer'; from ce meaning 'cultivate'), màr pál ('fisherman'; from pál meaning 'to fish'), màr pàlà ta: ('a fisher of fish').

Laal does show traces of an old Adamawa-type noun-class system, but apart from loans, the forms do not appear to be cognate with the Adamawa system (Lionnet 2010).

Some singular and plural nouns in Laal (Blench (2017):

Gloss	Laal	
Gloss	singular	plural
mahogany	círám	cúrmú
bag	bwālāg	bólgó
mat	sún	súnà
cock	kògòr	kwāgrā
hyena	ŋyāāl	ŋēē
ear	sɨ̀gál	sɨ̀gɨ́y
elephant	ɲé	ɲwáɲá
dog	ɓyāāg	ɓīīgāɲ
bird	ndíí	ndírmá
pigeon	lóóg	lwágmí
water	sū	sùgá
sheep	ɗēē	ɗwāār

=== Pronouns ===
==== Personal ====
In the following tables, note the distinction between inclusive and exclusive we, found in many other languages but not English, and the gender differentiation of "I" in certain forms. The inanimate plural has been dropped by most popular younger speakers in favour of the animate plural, but both are given below. The object paradigm for verbs is quite complex; only two of its several sets of allomorphs are given in the table below. "He" and "she" are used only for human referents; other nouns take the neuter pronoun. That is quite distinct from the languages with which Laal shares vocabulary, but Laal has traces of an old Adamawa-type noun-class system (Lionnet 2010). The first- and second-person plural forms are quite similar to Chadic languages (specifically, Kera) which are currently quite distant from the Laal-speaking region, but they have no similarities to Adamawa.

	Simple	Emphatic	Benefactive	At	Possessive	Object	
	Simple	Emphatic	Benefactive	At	Possessive	n-type	r-type
I (masc.)	ɟá	ɟá	ni	ɗe:	-↑ər	-↑ə́n	-↑ə́r
I (fem.)	ɟí	ɟí	ni	ɗe:	-↑ər	-↑ə́n	-↑ə́r
you	ʔò	ʔùáj	na	ɗa:	-↓a	-↘(u)án	-↘á
he	ʔà	ʔàáj	nar	ɗa:r	-↓ar	-↓án	-↓ár
she	ʔɨ̀n	ʔɨ̀ní	nùg	ɗò:g	-↑o(g), -↗o(g)	-↗òn	-↑ò
it	ʔàn	ʔàní	nàná	ɗà:ná	-↓an	-↓àn	-↓àr, -↓àn
we (excl.)	ʔùrú	ʔùrú	nùrú	ɗò:ró	-↑rú	-↗(ˋ)nùrú, -↑(ˋ)nùrú	-↗(ˋ)rùú, -↑(ˋ)rùú
we (incl.)	ʔàáŋ	ʔàáŋ	nàáŋ	ɗàáŋ	-↑ráŋ	-↑(ˋ)nàáŋ	-↑(ˋ)ràáŋ
you (pl.)	ʔùn	ʔùnúŋ	nùúŋ	ɗòóŋ	-↑rúŋ	-↗(ˋ)nùúŋ, -↑(ˋ)nùúŋ	-↗(ˋ)rùúŋ, -↑(ˋ)rùúŋ
they (anim.)	ʔì	ʔìrí	nìrí	ɗè:ri	-↑rí	-↑(ˋ)nìrí	-↑(ˋ)rìí
they (inan.)	ʔuàn	ʔuàní	nuàná	ɗuà:ná	-↘an, -↑uan	-↘àn	-↘àr, -↘àn

(The arrows indicate vowel harmony triggered in by the suffix by the root.)

==== Relative and indefinite pronouns ====
	Singular			Plural	
	Male	Female	Inanimate	Animate	Inanimate
who/of	ɟá	ɟí	má	jí	já
some ...	ɟàn	ɟìn	màn	jìn	jìn
such a ...	ɟuàŋá	ɟùŋú	muàŋá	jùŋú	jùŋú

==== Interrogative ====
jé ('what'), ɟè ('who'), ɗé ('where'), sɨ̀g ('how much')

=== Prepositions ===
Prepositions precede their objects: gɨ̀ pə:l ('in[to] the village'), kɨ́ jà:ná ('to his body'; lit. 'to near him').

=== Verbs ===
The verb does not vary according to the person or gender of the subject, but some verbs (about a quarter of the verbs attested) vary according to its number: no kaw ('the person eats'), mùáŋ kɨw ('the people eat'). The plural form of the verb is hard to predict, but is often formed by ablaut (typically raising the vowel height) with or without a suffix -i(ɲ) or -ɨɲ and tonal change. The verb, however, changes according to the direct object. It takes personal suffixes to indicate a pronominal direct object, and it commonly changes when a non-pronominal direct object is added to a transitive form with final low tone (formed similarly to the "centripetal", for which see below): ʔà ná ká ('he will do'); ʔà ná kàrà mɨ́ná ('he will do something'); ʔà kú na:ra ('he sees the man'); ʔà kúù:rùúŋ ('he sees you [pl.]').

The verb has three basic forms: simple, "centripetal", and "participative" to calque Boyeldieu's terminology. The simple form is used in the simple present tense or the imperative: ʔà duàg jə́w gə̀m ('he goes down the riverbank'; lit. 'he descend mouth riverbank'). The "centripetal" indicates action "hither", either spatially, motion towards the speaker, or temporally, action up to the present moment; it is formed mainly by suffixing a vowel (often, but not always, identical to the last vowel in the word): ʔà duàgà jə́w gə̀m ('he comes down the riverbank [towards me]'). The "participative", generally formed like the centripetal but with final high tone, generally indicates an omitted object or instrument:

ʔà sá ɗa:g ʔà sɨ̀rɨ́ su
he take calabash he drink-PARTICIP water
'He takes a calabash and drinks water with it'

Immediately before the verb, a particle may be placed to indicate forms other than a simple present tense; such particles include ná (pl. ní) marking future tense, taá:/teé: (pl. tií:) marking continuous action, wáa: (pl. wíi:) marking motion, náa: (pl. níi:) being apparently a combination of ná and wáa:, mà (pl. mì) meaning 'must', mɨ́ marking reported speech (apparently an evidential), mɨ́nà (pl. mínì) expressing intention, kò marking habitual action, ɓə́l or ga (pl. gi) marking incomplete action, and wó (always accompanied by ʔàle after the verb) meaning 'maybe'.

Mediopassives (see passive voice, middle voice) can be formed from transitive verbs by adding a suffix -↑ɨ́ɲ: no siár sà:b ('someone ripped the cloth') → sà:b sérɨ́ɲ ('the cloth ripped'). For the inverse, forming transitive verbs from intransitives, changes in tone or to the plural sometimes occur.

Verbal nouns can sometimes be formed, mainly from intransitives, by the addition of a suffix -(vowel)l, sometimes with ablaut and tone change: wal ('fall') → wàlál ('a fall'), sùbá ('lie') → sɨ́blál (pl. súbɨ̀r, 'a lie'). The l becomes n near a nasal and r near r: man ('taste good'), manan ('a good taste').

==== Adjectives ====
Adjectives do not seem to constitute an independent category in Laal; to all intents and purposes, they behave just like verbs: gò: ʔì:r ('the goat is black'). Attributively, they are typically linked as a relative clause:

gò: má ʔì:r
goat which black
'the black goat'

=== Numbers ===
Number	Laal
1	ɓɨ̀dɨ́l
2	ʔīsī
3	māː
4	ɓīsān
5	sāb
6	cìcàːn
7	suàr ʔīsī
8	ɓìsán ɓīsān
9	yàwjáŋ (sāb)
10	tūː

=== Adverbs ===
Adverbs generally come at the end of the clause. Here are some important adverbs:

Adverbs of location:

- 'here': ɗágàl, núŋú
- 'there': ɗaŋ
- 'over there, yonder': ɗàŋá

Temporal adverbs:

- 'day before yesterday': tá:r
- 'yesterday': ʔiè:n
- 'today': cicam, tari-màá
- 'recently': bèrè
- 'soon': sugo
- 'tomorrow': jìlí-kà:rì
- 'day after tomorrow': miàlgà

=== Modals ===
Here are the most important modals:

- Before the verb: mɨ́ ('[say] that'), gàná ('then')
- After the verb: wó ('not'), (ʔà)le ('maybe'), ɓə́l ('again'), ʔá or gà ('already'), à (interrogative), wá (exclamatory), ta ('now'), cám ('again, anew').

=== Conjunctions ===
Conjunctions can be divided into five types:

- only (main clause - conjunction - subordinate clause}: mɨ́ ('[say] that'), ɓə ('because')
- either {main clause - conjunction - subordinate clause} or {conjunction - subordinate clause - main clause}: ɟò ('if'), dànngà ('when'; possibly from Baguirmian)
- circumposed: either {conjunction - main clause - conjunction - subordinate clause} or {conjunction - subordinate clause - conjunction - main clause}: ɟò... gàná ('if')
- coordinate clause - conjunction - coordinate clause: ní ('then afterwards'), ku ('then'), kó ('nonetheless'), á or ná ('and'), ɓe: ('or'), ʔàmá ('but', from Arabic or Baguirmian).
- circumposed: conjunction - coordinate clause - conjunction - coordinate clause: ku... ku ('then'), jàn... jàn ('both... and').

== Sample sentences ==
mùáŋ lá tií: kìrì jé?
people Gori PROG-PL do-PL-TR what?
'What do the people of Gori do?'

mùáŋ lá tií: pál.
people Gori PROG-PL fish
'The people of Gori fish.'

màr-ce ɓɨ́lá mɨ́ "bɨ̀là, ʔò teé: ɗɨ̀grɨ̀r".
man+who-CULTIV say that no-way you PROG trick-me
'The farmer said, 'No way! You're tricking me.'"

ɟá ná wùsù na pè:rí ní ʔárí ʔò {ná kìnì} jé?
I.MASC will take+out-TR for-you.SG snake then first you give-me-TR what?
'If/When I take out the snake, what will you give me?'

jà kàskàr mà mùáŋ lá sə̀ɲə́ be.
with swords EMP.INAN people Gori fight-PARTICIP battle.
'It's with swords that the people of Gori fight.'

== See also ==
- Laal Swadesh list (Wiktionary)
