= Hawaiian grammar =

Grammar of the Hawaiian language

This article summarizes grammar in the Hawaiian language.

== Syntax ==
Hawaiian is a predominantly verb–subject–object language. However, word order is flexible, and the emphatic word can be placed first in the sentence. Hawaiian largely avoids subordinate clauses, and often uses a possessive construction instead. Hawaiian, unlike English, is a pro-drop language, meaning pronouns may be omitted when the meaning is clear from context.

The typical detailed word order is given by the following, with most items optional:

1. Tense/aspect signs: i, ua, e, etc.
2. Verb
3. Qualifying adverb: mau, wale, ole, pu, etc.
4. Passive sign: ʻia
5. Verbal directives: aku, mai, etc.
6. Locatives nei or lā, or particles ana or ai
7. Strengthening particle: nō
8. Subject
9. Object or predicate noun

=== Exceptions to VSO word order ===
If the sentence has a negative mood and the subject is a pronoun, word order is subject–verb–object following the negator ʻaʻole, as in:

ʻaʻole {ʻo ia} e puka ana
not he FUTURE graduate SINGLE.EVENT
"He won't graduate"

Another exception is when an emphatic adverbial phrase begins the sentence. In this case, a pronoun subject precedes the verb.

=== Interrogatives ===
Yes–no questions can be unmarked and expressed by intonation, or they can be marked by placing anei after the leading word of the sentence. Examples of question-word questions include:

He aha kēia?
INDEFINITE What this?
"What is this?"

ʻO wai kou inoa?
PROPER.SUBJECT who your name
"What is your name?"

== Nouns ==
As Hawaiian does not particularly discern between word types, any verb can be nominalized by preceding it with the definite article. However, some words that are used as nouns are rarely or never used as verbs. Within the noun phrase, adjectives follow the noun (e.g. ka hale liʻiliʻi "the house small", "the small house"), while possessors precede it (e.g. kou hale "your house"). Numerals precede the noun in the absence of the definite article, but follow the noun if the noun is preceded by the definite article.

=== Articles ===
Every noun is preceded by an article (ka‘i). The three main ones are:

- ke and ka – definitive singular – ke for words starting with letters k, e, a and o (usually memorised as ke ao "the cloud" rule); exceptions include words called nā kūʻēlula "the rule defiers" (e.g. ke pākaukau "the table", ke ʻō "the fork" and ke mele "the song"). For all other words ka is used.
- he – indefinite singular
- nā – plural (definite or indefinite)

=== Number ===
In noun phrases, two numbers (singular and plural) are distinguished. The singular articles ke and ka and the plural article nā are the only articles that mark number:

- ka pu‘u "the hill" vs. nā pu‘u "the hills"

In the absence of these articles, plurality is usually indicated by inserting the pluralizing particle mau immediately before the noun:

- he hale "a house" vs. he mau hale "houses"
- ko‘u hoaaloha "my friend" vs. ko‘u mau hoaaloha "my friends"

Most nouns do not change when pluralized; however, some nouns referring to people exhibit a lengthened vowel in the third syllable from the end in the plural:

- he wahine "a woman" vs. he mau wāhine "women"
- ka ‘elemakule "the old man" vs. nā ‘elemākule "the old men"
- ia kahuna "the aforementioned priest" vs. ia mau kāhuna "the aforementioned priests"

=== Gender ===
In Hawaiian, there is no gender distinction in the third person. The word for third person (he, she, it) is ia. It is commonly preceded by ʻo as in ʻo ia and, following standard modern orthographical rules, is written as two words, but it can be seen as one when written by older speakers and in historical documents.

Hawaiian nouns belong to one of two genders. This gender system is not based on biological sex and is better analyzed as a distinction between alienable and inalienable possession, which is a common split in many of the world's languages. The two genders are known as the kino ʻō (o-class) and the kino ʻā (a-class). These classes are only taken into account when using the genitive case (see table of personal pronouns below).

Kino ʻō nouns, in general, are nouns whose creation cannot be controlled by the subject, such as inoa "name", puʻuwai "heart", and hale "house". Specific categories for o-class nouns include: modes of transportation (e.g. kaʻa "car" and lio "horse"), things that you can go into, sit on or wear (e.g., lumi "room", noho "chair", ʻeke "bag", and lole "clothes"), and people in your generation (e.g., siblings, cousins) and previous generations (e.g. makuahine "mother").

Kino ʻā nouns, in general, are those whose creation can be controlled, such as waihoʻoluʻu "color", as in kaʻu waihoʻoluʻu punahele "my favorite color". Specific categories include: your boyfriend or girlfriend (ipo), spouse, friends, and future generations in your line (all of your descendants).

The change of preposition of o "of" (kino ʻō) to a "of" (kino ʻā) is especially important for prepositional and subordinate phrases:

- ka mea "the thing"
- kona mea "his thing (nonspecific)"
- kāna mea "his thing (which he created or somehow chose)"
- ka mea āna i ʻike ai "the thing that he saw"
- kāna (mea) i ʻike ai "what he saw"
- kēia ʻike ʻana āna "this thing that he saw (purposefully)"
- kēia ʻike ʻana ona "this thing that he saw (purportedly)" where the seeing isn't much import

== Counting ==
Other than the usual decimal numbers, Hawaiian has a mixed base-4-base-10 counting system:

- 4: kauna = ahā kahi ('four ones')
- 40: kaʻau = ʻumi kauna ('ten fours')
- 400: lau = ʻumi kaʻau ('ten forties')
- 4000: mano = ʻumi lau ('ten four-hundreds')

== Demonstrative determiners ==
Demonstrative determiners	Proximal	Medial	Distal
Singular	kēia	kēnā	kēlā
Plural	kēia mau	kēnā mau	kēlā mau
Singular (aforementioned)	ua ... nei	ua ... lā/ala	ua ... lā/ala
Plural (aforementioned)	ua mau ... nei	ua mau ... lā/ala	ua mau ... lā/ala

== Personal pronouns ==
Personal pronouns
			Case				
			Nominative	Genitive			Accusative, Dative
			Nominative	alienable	obligatory	affectionate	Accusative, Dative
Singular (1)	1st		au	kaʻu	koʻu	kuʻu	iaʻu
Singular (1)	2nd		ʻoe	kāu	kou	kō	iā ʻoe
Singular (1)	3rd		ia	kāna	kona	Only used in 1st and 2nd person singular.	iā ia
Dual (2)	1st	incl.	kāua	kā kāua	ko kāua	Only used in 1st and 2nd person singular.	iā kāua
Dual (2)	1st	excl.	māua	kā māua	ko māua	Only used in 1st and 2nd person singular.	iā māua
Dual (2)	2nd		ʻolua	kā ʻolua	ko ʻolua	Only used in 1st and 2nd person singular.	iā ʻolua
Dual (2)	3rd		lāua	kā lāua	kō lāua	Only used in 1st and 2nd person singular.	iā lāua
Plural (3+)	1st	incl.	kākou	kā kākou	ko kākou	Only used in 1st and 2nd person singular.	iā kākou
Plural (3+)	1st	excl.	mākou	kā mākou	ko mākou	Only used in 1st and 2nd person singular.	iā mākou
Plural (3+)	2nd		ʻoukou	kā ʻoukou	ko ʻoukou	Only used in 1st and 2nd person singular.	iā ʻoukou
Plural (3+)	3rd		lākou	kā lākou	kō lākou	Only used in 1st and 2nd person singular.	iā lākou

== Verbs ==
=== Tense, aspect, and mood ===
Verbs can be analytically marked with particles to indicate tense, aspect and mood. Separate verb markers are used in relative clauses, after the negation word ʻaʻole, and in some other situations.

Common Tense, Aspect, and Mood Markers
Tense/Aspect/Mood	Default	After ʻaʻole or in type I relative clause	Type II relative clause
Tenseless	[verb]	(e) [verb]	e [verb] ai
Perfective	ua [verb]	i [verb]	i [verb] ai
Progressive	e [verb] ana/ala/lā	e [verb] ana/ala/lā	e [verb] ana/ala/lā
Present	ke [verb] nei/ala/lā	e [verb] nei/ala/lā	e [verb] nei/ala/lā
Intentive/infinitive	e [verb]	e [verb]	e [verb] ai
Imperative	(e) [verb]		
Prohibitive	mai [verb]		

The marker ala/lā implies greater spatial or temporal distance from the speaker than nei or ana.

In his "Introduction to Hawaiian Grammar," W.D. Alexander proposed that Hawaiian has a pluperfect tense as follows:

- ua + verb + ʻē: pluperfect tense/aspect (ua hana ʻē au "I had worked")

However, this is debatable since ʻē simply means "beforehand, in advance, already". Andrews [Gram. 1.4] suggested the same thing that Alexander forwards. However, Ua hana ʻē au could mean both "I have already worked", "I already worked", and (depending on the temporal context) "I had worked previous to that moment." "Already" is the operative unifier for these constructions as well as the perfective quality denoted by ua. ʻĒ therefore is acting like a regular Hawaiian adverb, following the verb it modifies:

- Ua hana paha au. Perhaps I worked.
- Ua hana mālie au. I worked steadily, without disruption.
- Ua hana naʻe au. I even worked.

=== Passive Voice ===
Transitive verbs can be passivized with the particle ʻia, which follows the verb but precedes tense/aspect/mood markers. The agent, if specified, is marked with the preposition e, usually translated as "by" in English:

- Ke kūkulu ʻia lā ka hale e mākou. The house is being built by us

=== Equative sentences ===
Hawaiian does not have a copula verb meaning "to be" nor does it have a verb meaning "to have". Equative sentences are used to convey this group of ideas. All equative sentences in Hawaiian are zero-tense/mood (i.e., they cannot be modified by verbal markers, particles or adverbs).

==== Pepeke ʻAike He "A is a B" ====
Pepeke ʻAike He is the name for the simple equative sentence "A is a(n) B". The pattern is "He B (ʻo) A." ʻO marks the third person singular pronoun ia (which means "he/she/it") and all proper nouns.

- He kaikamahine ʻo Mary. Mary is a girl.
- He kaikamahine ʻo ia. She is a girl.
- He Hawaiʻi kēlā kaikamahine. That girl is (a) Hawaiian.
- He hāumana ke keiki. The child is a student.

==== Pepeke ʻAike ʻO ====
Pepeke ʻAike ʻO is the name for the simple equative sentence "A is B." The pattern is " ʻO A (ʻo) B," where the order of the nouns is interchangeable and where ʻo invariably marks the third person singular pronoun ia and all proper nouns (regardless of where it is in the utterance).

- ʻO Mary ʻo ia. ʻO ia ʻo Mary. She is Mary.
- ʻO Mary nō ia. ʻO ia nō ʻo Mary. It's Mary.
- ʻO wau ʻo Mary. ʻO Mary wau. I'm Mary.
- ʻO ʻoe ʻo Mary. ʻO Mary ʻoe. You are Mary.
- ʻO Mary ke kaikamahine. ʻO ke kaikamahine ʻo Mary. Mary is the girl. The girl is Mary.
- ʻO ka haumana ke keiki. ʻO ke keiki ka haumana. The student is the child. The child is the student.

==== Pepeke Henua (Locational equative) ====
Pepeke Henua is the name for the simple equative sentence "A is located (in/on/at/etc. B)." The pattern is "Aia (ʻo) A..."

- Aia ʻo Mary ma Hilo. Mary is in Hilo.
- Aia ʻo ia maloko o ka wai. He/she/it is inside (of) the water.
- Aia ka haumana mahea? Aia mahea ka haumana? Where is the student?

==== Pepeke ʻAike Na ====
Pepeke ʻAike Na is the name of the simple equative sentence "A belongs to B." The pattern is "Na (B) A." The singular pronouns undergo predictable changes.

Pronoun	Nominative	Genitive "for" or "belonging to"
First person singular "I"	(w)au	naʻu
Second person singular "You"	ʻoe	nāu
Third person singular "he/she/it"	(ʻo) ia	nāna
First person plural, dual inclusive "we; you and I"	kāua	na kāua

Pepeke ʻAike Na Examples:

Naʻu ke kaʻa. The car belongs to me. That's my car.

Na Mary ke keiki. The child is Mary's. It's Mary's child.

Nāna ka penikala. The pencil belongs to him/her/it.

Nāu nō au. I belong to you. I'm yours.

Note:

ʻO kēia ke kaʻa nāu. This is the car I'm giving to you.

He makana kēlā na ke aliʻi. This is a present for the chief.

=== Other verbal particles ===
Other post-verbal markers include

- verb + mai: "toward the speaker"
- verb + aku: "away from the speaker"
- verb + iho: "down"
- verb + aʻe: "up", "adjacent"
- stative verb + iā + agent: agent marker

=== Causative verb creation ===
Causative verbs can be created from nouns and adjectives by using the prefix ho'o-, as illustrated in the following:

- nani "pretty"; hoʻonani "to beautify"
- nui "large"; hoʻonui "to enlarge"
- hui "club"; hoʻohui "to form a club"

== Reduplication ==
Reduplication can emphasize or otherwise alter the meaning of a word. Examples are:

- ʻau "to swim"; ʻauʻau "to bathe"
- haʻi "to say"; haʻihaʻi "to speak back and forth"
- maʻi "sick"; maʻimaʻi "chronically sick"
