= Niellim language =

Bua language spoken in Chad

Niellim
- lwaà
- Native to: southwestern Chad
- Native speakers: (5,200 cited 1993 census)
- Language family: Niger–Congo?: Atlantic–Congo; Mbum–Day; Bua; Niellim

Language codes
- ISO 639-3: nie
- Glottolog: niel1243
- ELP: Niellim
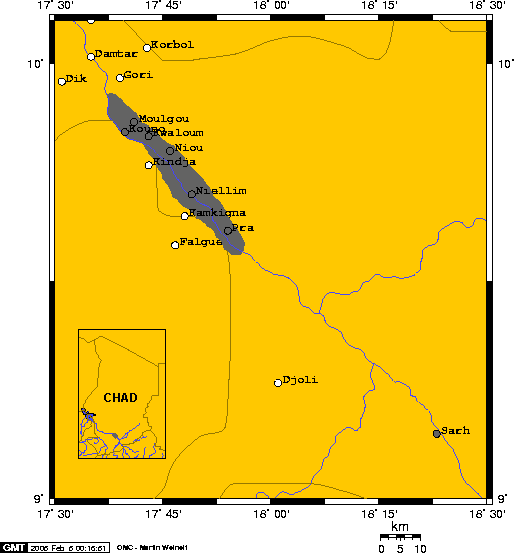
- Closeup of the area where Niellim is spoken.

The Niellim language (autonym lwaà) is a Bua language spoken by some 5,000 people (as of 1993) along the Chari River in southern Chad. It is mainly spoken in two areas: one around the city of Sarh (to which many - perhaps most - speakers have migrated) and one, its traditional home, further north, between about 9°30′ and 9°50′ N, corresponding to the former chiefdoms of Pra and Niou, as well as the Niellim Sultanate.

Niellim borders on several languages of diverse families – in particular Sara, Ndam, and Laal – and is influenced by the local lingua franca, Baguirmi; it has itself strongly influenced Laal, but also apparently has been influenced by Laal, or a relative of Laal, since much of the common Laal–Niellim vocabulary is not Bua. It is notably homogeneous. As a small minority in Chad, its speakers usually have to learn other languages, mostly (as of 1974) Baguirmi, Sara, Arabic, and Bua.

== Niellim Sultanate ==
In the middle of the 19th century, the Niellim-speaking clan along the Chari organized into a small sultanate. Throughout the latter half of the century, they suffered various raids by the Baguirmi Kingdom, until they were eventually vassalized by them. Under their rule, they assimilated with the Barma people.

== Phonology ==
The consonants are:

		Bilabial	Alveolar	Palatal	Velar	Glottal
Stop	voiceless	p	t	c	k	ʔ
Stop	plain voiced	b	d	ɟ	g	
Stop	prenasalized	ᵐb	ⁿd	ᶮɟ	ᵑɡ	
Stop	Implosive	ɓ	ɗ			
Fricative			s			h
Nasal		m	n	ɲ	ŋ	
Nasal approximant					w̃	
Approximant			l	j	w	
Trill			r			

The vowels are /i/, /ɨ/, /u/, /e/, /ə/, /a/, and /o/ as well as the diphthongs, /ja/ and /wa/; all except /ɨ/ can also be given contrastive length and nasalization. Complex vowel harmony, rather similar to that found in Laal, is observable.

There are three tone levels: low, mid, high. Any syllable must bear at least one tone; it may bear any combination of two tones, or one of three three-tone combinations: LML, MLH, or HLH.

== Grammar ==
=== Syntax ===
The typical word order is subject–verb–object (though this can be affected by topic fronting); preposition - prepositional object (- postposition); noun - adjective; possessed - possessor. However, possessive pronouns precede the noun.

=== Pronouns ===
The basic personal pronouns include: n 'I', m 'you', r 'he, she, it' (with low tone as subjects, high tone as objects), í 'you (pl.)', and á 'they'. ("We" does not appear in sources so far examined by the editors.)

=== Nouns ===
Noun plural formation is quite complex, and includes some apparent relics of a now-absent noun class system; the commonest ways include combinations of internal vowel ablaut, the suffix -gɨ, a change l/n > r, and/or replacing final -a with -i.

=== Verbs ===
Each verb has two forms: indicative and optative ("injunctive" in Boyeldieu's terminology.) They are distinguished by tonal pattern.

Verbs may be preceded by various particles to indicate tense, aspect, and mood: for instance wò continuous, ɓə future, ká obligation. Indirect quoted speech is preceded with the particle ɓə 'that'.

Verbal nouns may be formed by changing the tone pattern and/or suffixing -li or -la (in which the l becomes n following a nasal) together with internal vowel ablaut.

Verb derivational suffixes include -n intensive (realized as -nì or -ɨ̀n, e.g., nun 'bite' > nùnɨ̀n 'gnaw', and sometimes causing internal ablaut), and -gɨ̀ mediopassive (sometimes -gi or -gu, rarely causes internal ablaut).

=== Prepositions ===
Common prepositions include gɨ̀ 'to (dative)', naà 'with', and ti 'to'.

== Examples ==
- ɓá̰ tɨba ti ʔùu:l, sì sì, tén w̃àɲ, kà ŕ lápyaà.

child fall road, go go, find chief, do him hello.
The child set off, walked and walked, found the chief and greeted him.

- á na ŕ ndúu: ní ŕ ɲì.

they give him water he drink
They gave him water to drink.

- jée:l lá ŕ ʔwa̰ ŕ ɓi:r tén w̃àɲ:

evening too he get-up he ask chief:
In the evening he got up and asked the chief:

- w̃àɲ, ɲìin hina ḿ ɓá̰ tàa:m. ɛɛ̀, pàáy kəə̀y? ǹ tà:m ḿ ɓá̰ càaw.

chief I(emph.) come you child seek, eh, is-it what?, I want you child marry (verbal noun)
"Chief, I have come to seek your daughter; I want to marry your daughter."

(From a story recounted by Dakour Yalka Ali, in Boyeldieu 1985, p. 10)
