= Chinguil =

Coordinates: 10°33′N 18°58′E

- Sub-prefecture
- Location in Chad
- Country: Chad

Chinguil is a sub-prefecture of Guéra Region in Chad.

== Demographics ==
Ethnic composition by canton in 2016:

Daguela Canton (population: 22,000; villages: 65):

Ethnic group	Linguistic affiliation	Percentage
Gula	Bua	90
Fania	Bua	6
Koke	Bua	4

Sorki Canton (population: 6,000; villages: 38):

Ethnic group	Linguistic affiliation	Percentage
Bolgo	Bua	45
Sabah	East Chadic	35
Mogom	East Chadic	20
