= Gula Iro language =

Bua language of Chad

Gula Iro
- Native to: Chad
- Native speakers: (3,500 cited 1991)
- Language family: Niger–Congo?: Atlantic–Congo; Mbum–Day; Bua; Gula; Gula Iro

Language codes
- ISO 639-3: glj
- Glottolog: gula1265

The Gula Iro language (autonym kùláál) is a Bua language spoken by some 3,500 people (in 1991) north and east of Lake Iro in southern Chad, between the Bola and Salamat rivers. It has four dialects, according to Pairault:

- páṭóól (350 speakers), the northernmost and the least comprehensible to speakers of the other dialects, spoken in and around Badi;
- pòŋààl (2,000 speakers), by the north shore of the lake, spoken in and around Boum Kabir, Boum Sarher, and Tordjigel;
- tɩ́ààlà (730 speakers), spoken east and south of the lake, including Kouré, Bouni, Tormorhal, and Masidjanga;
- tííṭààl (200 speakers), the easternmost, spoken in various villages west of Tamba;

to which Ethnologue adds a fifth, Korintal (170 speakers), spoken in Tieou.

Gula Iro is very closely related to Zan Gula and Bon Gula, but they are not mutually comprehensible.

== Phonology ==
The consonants, along with their orthography, are:

	Bilabial	Labiodental	Apico-dental	Postalveolar	Palatal	Velar	Glottal
Plosives	p		t	ṭ		k	
Fricatives		f			s		h
Liquids	w		l		y		
Nasal	m		n		ñ	ŋ	
Trills			r				

The vowels are: a, e, i, o, u, ɛ, ɩ, ɔ, ʋ. Nasalization (only on a, e, o) and length are both contrastive, and diphthongs can be formed. Tone is phonemic; each vowel must carry high or low tone.

== Grammar ==
Typical word order is subject–verb–object. The basic subject pronouns are: ñó I, mó you (sg.), á he/she/it, pʋ́ we (exclusive), én we (inclusive), í you (pl.), ʋ́ they.

== Bibliography ==
- P. Boyeldieu. "La formation du pluriel nominal en kulaal (Tchad): essai de systématisation des documents publiés par C. Pairault". Afrika und Übersee, 1986, n° 69, vol. 2, p. 209-249.
- C. Pairault, Documents du parler d'iro: kùláál du Tchad. Langues et Littérature de l'Afrique Noire V. Klincksieck: Paris 1969.
