= Bolgo language =

Bua languages of Chad

Bolgo
- Bólɡònî
- Native to: Chad
- Native speakers: (1,800 cited 1993 census)
- Language family: Niger–Congo?: Atlantic–Congo; Mbum–Day; Bua; Bolgo

Language codes
- ISO 639-3: bvo
- Glottolog: bolg1251

- Person: bólɡò
- Language: bólɡònî

The Bolgo language is a member of the Bua languages spoken in south-central Chad, in the villages of Koya, Boli, Gagne, and Bedi southeast of Melfi, by about 1,800 people (SIL 1993). Speakers also make up the majority of the population of Sorki canton in Chinguil sub-prefecture.

== Dialects ==
According to de Rendinger, it has two principal dialects, Bolgo Werel around Daguela and Bolgo Mengo around Aloa-Niagara, as well as a dialect called Bolgo Bormo; according to the Ethnologue, its principal dialects are called Bolgo Dugag and Bolgo Kubar ("small" and "great" Bolgo.) Great Bolgo is spoken to the north, bordering Mogum and Saba; Little Bolgo is spoken to the south, bordering the closely related language Koke as well as Chadian Arabic.

Bolgo groups and names listed by Kastenholz (2017:4):

Group	Autonym	Glossonym
Bolgo Dugag (Southern)	tērēù	tērēùnī
Bolgo Kubar (NW)	bólɡò and jàlkín (two subgroups)	bólɡònî
Bolgo Kubar (NE)	bòrmó	bòrmónì

== Grammar ==
Its typical word order is subject–verb–object, noun–adjective, aspect–verb, possessor–possessed. There is no true plural, but -gi serves as a collective marker. The verb is negated with ta, placed at the end of the sentence.

Example sentences:

- in-nāṇ rīm nāṇ n'ini (give-me water I drink), "give me water to drink"
- ibéri koko ao léti (man marry woman two), "the man married two women".

== Bibliography ==
- Gen. de Rendinger, "Contribution à l'étude des langues nègres du Centre Africain", Journal de la Société des Africanistes, XIX-II, 1949, pp. 143–194.
- Peter Fuchs, 1970, Die Religion der Hadjerai: Kult und Autorität. Berlin. (Contains an ethnolinguistic map of the region.)
- Kastenholz, Raimund (2017). La Langue Bolgo du Guéra (Tchad): Notes de recherche et matériel lexical. Arbeitspapiere des Instituts für Ethnologie und Afrikastudien der Johannes Gutenberg-Universität Mainz. (Working Papers of the Department of Anthropology and African Studies of the Johannes Gutenberg University Mainz) 172.
- Tikka, Katie Ann. 2019. "Phonology And Morphology Of Bolgo" (2019). MA thesis, University of North Dakota. https://commons.und.edu/theses/2869
