= University of Sarh =

University in Chad (IAU-019643)

Coordinates: 9°04′53″N 18°25′31″E

- Université de Sarh
- Type: Public university
- Established: 18 November 2010; 15 years ago
- Rector: Mbailao Mbaiguinam
- Location: Sarh, Moyen-Chari, Chad
- Language: French

The University of Sarh is a public higher education institution in Chad, located in the city of Sarh.

== History ==
The draft law for the creation of the University of Sarh was reviewed and adopted by the Chadian Council of Ministers on 18 November 2010.

== Composition ==
The University of Sarh comprises two pre-existing institutions: the University Institute of Agricultural Sciences and Environment of Sarh (IUSAES) and the Higher Normal School of Technical Education (ENSET).

== List of Rectors ==
Since 8 June 2011: Mbailao Mbaiguinam

== See also ==
- Higher education in Chad
