= Tug (disambiguation) =

A tug or tugboat is a boat that maneuvers vessels by pushing or towing them.

Tug or TUG may also refer to:

== Transportation ==
- A powerful aircraft used to tow gliders
- A common nickname for pushback tow tractors used at airports
- Towboat
- Turnham Green tube station, London, London Underground station code TUG

== Geography ==
- Tuğ, Azerbaijan, a village
- Tug Fork, a tributary of the Big Sandy River in the United States

== As a nickname ==
- Tug Arundel (1862–1912), American Major League Baseball catcher
- Tug Hulett (born 1983), American baseball player
- Tug McGraw (1944–2004), Major League Baseball pitcher
- Tug Thompson (1856–1938), Major League Baseball player
- Tug Wilson (disambiguation), various people
- Tug Yourgrau, American playwright and TV producer
- Tug O'Neale, fictional character in the Australian soap opera Far and Away

== Arts and entertainment ==
- Tug (film), a 2010 film
- Tugs (TV series), a British children's TV series
- Tug Records, a record label

== TUG ==
- TÜBİTAK National Observatory (Turkish: TÜBİTAK Ulusal Gozlemevi), an astronomical observatory in southern Turkey
- TeX Users Group
- Timed Up and Go test, a simple test to assess a person's physical mobility
- The Ultimate Group, a record label and management company
- Technical University of Gdańsk, former name of Gdańsk University of Technology, Poland

== Other uses ==
- Tug (banner), a symbol of power in Mongol and Turkish states
- Tacoma Tugs, former name of minor league baseball team the Tacoma Rainiers
- Tuguegarao Airport's IATA code
- ISO 639 code for the Tunia language of Chad
- nickname for King's Scholars at Eton College
- A slang term for male masturbation

== See also ==
- Tugg (disambiguation)
