= GLJ =

GLJ may refer to:

- Gene Loves Jezebel
- Georgetown Law Journal
- German Law Journal
- Grupo León Jimenes
- Gula Iro language
