= Bragoto River =

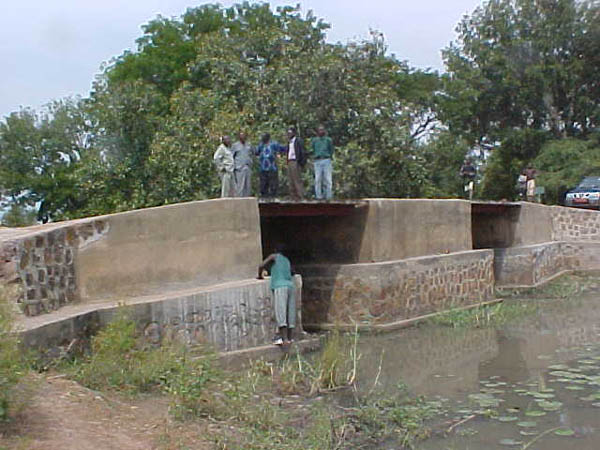
- Rebuilt bridge on Bragoto River

The Bragoto River is a river in southern Chad. It is a tributary of the Chari River.

The bridge spanning Chad's Bragoto River had collapsed, forcing farmers in the region of Koumogo to travel 127 kilometres (79 mi) to market their produce in Sarh, as opposed to 63 kilometres (39 mi) using the bridge. It was rebuilt with special self-help funds by the Koumogo Village Association.
