= Gori, Chad =

Village in Chad

Coordinates: 9°58′N 17°39′E

Gori (Arabic: غور) is a small village in Chad on the banks of the Chari River, near Sarh. It is the largest of only three villages where Laal is spoken.
