= Noy language =

Nearly extinct language of Chad

Noy
- Loo
- Native to: Chad
- Native speakers: (36 cited 1993 census)
- Language family: Niger–Congo?: Atlantic–Congo; Mbum–Day; Bua; Noy

Language codes
- ISO 639-3: noy
- Glottolog: noyy1238
- ELP: Noy

Noy, or Loo, is a nearly extinct language of Chad. In 1993 it had a population of 36 speakers, who lived in the Moyen-Chari and Mandoul regions, between Sarh, Djoli, Bédaya, Koumra, and Koumogo villages. Speakers are shifting to Sar, the lingua franca of regional capital Sarh.
