= Issa Doubragne =

Chadian teacher-researcher and politician

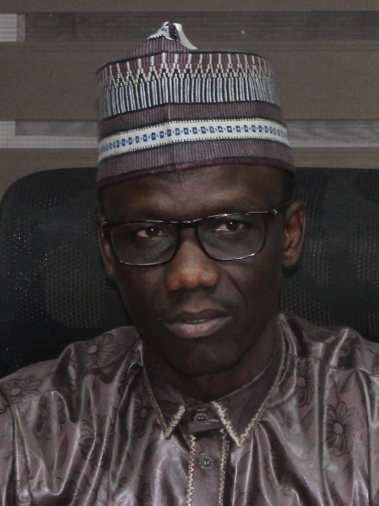

Chadian Minister of Economy, Development Planning, and International Cooperation
- Incumbent
- Assumed office 24 December 2017
- President: Idriss Déby; Mahamat Idriss Déby
- Prime Minister: Albert Pahimi Padacké (since 2021)
- Preceded by: Ngueto Yambaye

Personal details
- Born: Issa Doubragne; 7 July 1973 Goundi, Chad
- Education: University of N'Djamena; University of Paris 1 Pantheon-Sorbonne; Aix-Marseille University
- Profession: Teacher

Issa Doubragne (born 7 July 1973) is a Chadian teacher-researcher and politician. He has been the minister of economy and development planning since 7 May 2018.

== Biography ==
=== Education ===
Issa Doubragne obtained his A4 series baccalaureate from Charles Lwanga College in Sarh with a "Fairly Good" grade in 1996. In 2000, he received his degree in geography from the University of N'Djamena, specializing in territorial planning. In 2003, he earned his master's degree from Aix-Marseille University, also in geography with a focus on development and the Third World. His thesis was titled "Cotton and Oil in Chad; Competitive Effects" under the supervision of Professor Jean-Claude Giacottino. He continued his studies at the University of Paris 1 Pantheon-Sorbonne, where he obtained a Diploma of Advanced Studies (DEA) in geography, specializing in Tropical Worlds: Environment-Planning-Territories. His thesis was on "Impacts of Oil Exploitation in Gabon and Congo in a New Petro-political Context in Central Africa" in 2004. In 2013, Issa Doubragne earned his doctorate with "Honorable Mention" from the University of Paris 1 Pantheon-Sorbonne in geography, specializing in Territory, Power Relations, and Globalization. His dissertation was titled "Logone Oriental Between Oil and Refugees: A Study of Socio-Economic Impacts".

=== Career ===
Issa Doubragne began his career in the associative sector as Program and Project Manager for the Union of Graduates, Students, and Pupils of Moyen Chari for Culture and Development from 1996 to 1999 before serving as President of the executive board for a year. He then became the National Vice-Coordinator for Programs and Projects of the Chadian Youth Organizations Forum (FOJET) in 2000, later becoming the National Coordinator from 2001 to 2002. From January to August 2006, he taught at the Adam Barka University of Abéché. He was subsequently recruited by Africare as Assistant Project Coordinator in Goré on the Central African Refugee Assistance Project in southern Chad, a position he held from 2007 to 2009. From 2009 to 2013, he was Project Coordinator for the Africa Bureau in the same organization. From 2012 to 2013, Issa Doubragne taught at the University of Moundou. He is also the founder and national director of the Humanitarian Initiative for Local Development (IHDL-CHAD).

He has been the Minister of Economy and Development Planning since 7 May 2018.
