= Tugg =

Tugg may refer to:

- Tugg the Bull Terrier, American Kennel Club Award of Canine Excellence winner and star of his own Web Series.
- Captain Tugg, television host
- Tugg Speedman, character from Tropic Thunder
- Tugg Inc., a defunct film-related crowdsourcing website

== See also ==
- Tug (disambiguation)
