= Saint Charles Lwanga University of Sarh =

University in Chad

- Established: 2018; 8 years ago
- Location: Sarh, Chad
- Website: www.ucl-tchad.com

Saint Charles Lwanga University of Sarh is a university located in Sarh, Chad.

Established in 2018, it was an initiative of the Association of Former Students of Charles Lwanga High School in Sarh. Its program follows the LMD (Licence, Master, Doctorate) system and focuses on: economic sciences and management sciences, electrical engineering and computer engineering.

== Location ==
The university is located in Sarh in the south of the country, which is the third most populated city in Chad.

== See also ==
- List of universities in Chad
