= Bua language =

Language of Chad

Bua
- Ba
- Native to: Chad
- Native speakers: (7,700 cited 1993 census)
- Language family: Niger–Congo?: Atlantic–Congo; Volta-Congo; Savannas; Mbum–Day; Bua; Bua
- Dialects: Kawaway

Language codes
- ISO 639-3: bub
- Glottolog: buaa1245

The Bua language (also called Ba) is spoken north of the Chari River around Korbol and Gabil in Chad. In 1993 it was spoken by some 8,000 people. It is the largest member of the small Bua group of languages and is mutually comprehensible with Fanian. Kawãwãy (Korom) may be a dialect or a distinct language.

Bua is a local lingua franca in Korbol Canton, due to the historical influence of the Korbol Caliphate in the late 18th and 19th centuries. Speakers also live around Gabil (in the Guéra Region), and in Sarh and N'Djaména.

== Korom ==
Korom is spoken by about 60 people in 3 or 4 villages in Moyen-Chari Region and Guéra Region of Chad. The main community of speakers is called Kawãwãy, who comprise a community of blacksmiths in Tili Nugar (Tilé Nougar), a Fania village. The language has been documented by Florian Lionnet and R. Hoinathy in 2014 and 2017. Lionnet considers Korom to be separate language closely related to Bua.
