= Balimba =

Coordinates: 9°08′N 18°21′E

- Sub-prefecture
- Location in Chad
- Country: Chad

Balimba is a sub-prefecture of Moyen-Chari Region in Chad.
