= Koke language =

Adamawa language of Chad

Koke
- Native to: Chad
- Native speakers: (600 cited 1993 census)
- Language family: Niger–Congo?: Atlantic–Congo; Mbum–Day; Bua; Koke

Language codes
- ISO 639-3: kou
- Glottolog: koke1240
- ELP: Koke

Koke is an Adamawa language of Chad. Speakers are found in Daguela Canton, Chinguil Sub-prefecture, Guéra Region.
