= Korbol =

Coordinates: 10°00′N 17°43′E

- Sub-prefecture
- Location in Chad
- Country: Chad

Korbol is a sub-prefecture of Moyen-Chari Region in Chad.

The Bua language is the local lingua franca of Korbol.
