= Bon Gula language =

Adamawa language of Chad

Bon Gula
- Native to: Chad
- Native speakers: (1,200 cited 1997)
- Language family: Niger–Congo?: Atlantic–Congo; Mbum–Day; Bua; Gula; Bon Gula

Language codes
- ISO 639-3: glc
- Glottolog: bong1282
- ELP: Bon Gula

Bon Gula, or Bon, is an Adamawa language of Chad.
