= Koumogo =

Koumogo كوموغو
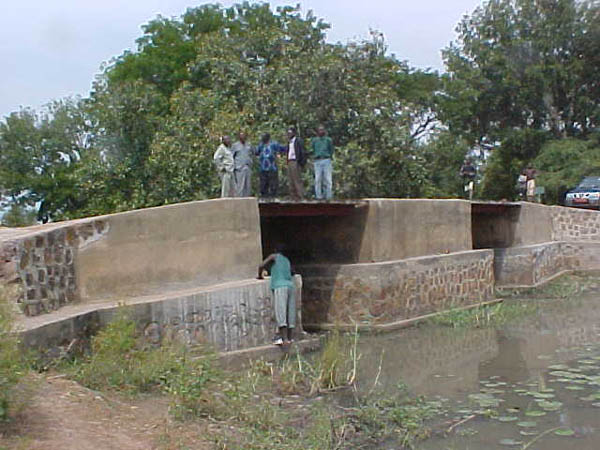

- Location in Chad
- Coordinates: 8°40′N 18°22′E
- Country: Chad
- Region: Moyen-Chari
- Time zone: +1

Koumogo (Arabic: كوموغو) is a small town in Chad.

== Bridge ==
A bridge over the Bragoto River collapsed, disrupting road traffic until the bridge was reconstructed.
