= Fania language =

Language spoken in Chad

Fania
- Kulaale
- Native to: Chad
- Native speakers: (1,100 cited 1997)
- Language family: Niger–Congo?: Atlantic–Congo; Mbum–Day; Bua; Fania

Language codes
- ISO 639-3: fni
- Glottolog: fani1244
- ELP: Fania

- Person: Kulaanu
- People: Kulaaway
- Language: Kulaale

Fania (Fagnan; also called Kulaale) is an Adamawa language of Chad. The northern and southern dialects are rather divergent.

== Names ==
Fania is an exonym. Speakers refer to their own language as Kulaale, their people as Kulaaway, and one person as Kulaanu.

Names listed in Boyeldieu, et al. (2018:56):

- Autonym in Khalil Alio: Ɛma [ɛma] / pl. Ɛiwɛ [ɛɪwɛ]
- Autonym in Tilé Nougar: Kulaanum [kʊ̀láːnʊ́m] / pl. Kulaaway [kʊ̀láːwɐ̀y]
- Glossonym: Kulaale [kʊ̀láːlɛ̀] / pl. Kulaaru [kʊ̀láːɽʊ̀]

== Villages ==
Ethnologue (22nd ed.) lists Karo, Malakonjo, Rim, Sengué, and Sisi villages (Mouraye area north of Sarh) as Fania locations. Lionnet also lists the village of Tili Nugar (Tilé Nougar).
