= Zan Gula language =

Adamawa language of Chad

Zan Gula
- Native to: Chad
- Native speakers: 5,000 (2003)
- Language family: Niger–Congo?: Atlantic–Congo; Mbum–Day; Bua; Gula; Zan Gula

Language codes
- ISO 639-3: zna
- Glottolog: zang1249
- ELP: Zan Gula

Zan Gula, or Zan, is an Adamawa language of Chad.
