= Obligatory possession =

Obligatory possession is a linguistic phenomenon that is common in languages whose nouns are inflected for possessor, and some words, commonly kinship terms and body parts, cannot occur without a possessor in those languages. The World Atlas of Language Structures (WALS) lists 43 languages in its 244 language sample as having obligatory possession. Languages with obligatory possession are concentrated in New Guinea and in North and South America. Generally, obligatory possession is found throughout a family (such as Algonquian languages, represented by Plains Cree in the WALS sample, and Mayan languages represented by Tzutujil in the WALS sample), but not all Athabaskan languages have it. Slavey does not have obligatory possession but Navajo has it. Obligatory possession is also present in the language isolate Haida. English has it for own as an adjective: one's own body not *an own body.

Obligatory possession is sometimes called inalienable possession. However, true inalienable possession is a semantic notion, largely dependent on how a culture structures the world, whereas obligatory possession is a property of morphemes. In general, nouns with the property of requiring obligatory possession are notionally inalienably possessed, but the relation is rarely, if ever, perfect.

== See also ==
- Possession (linguistics)
