= Tunia language =

Adamawa language spoken in Chad

Tunia
- Native to: Chad
- Native speakers: (2,300 cited 1993 census)
- Language family: Niger–Congo?: Atlantic–Congo; Mbum–Day; Bua; Tunia

Language codes
- ISO 639-3: tug
- Glottolog: tuni1251
- ELP: Tunia

Tunia is an Adamawa language of Chad.
