= University of Moundou =

University in Chad

Coordinates: 8.630°N 16.028°E

- Institut universitaire des techniques d'entreprises de Moundou
- Type: Public university
- Established: 2002
- Location: Moundou, Logone Occidental, Chad
- Language: French
- Affiliations: Agence universitaire de la Francophonie (AUF)
- Website: univ-moundou.org

The University of Moundou (UDM) is a public higher education institution in Chad, located in the city of Moundou in the southwest of the country.

== History ==
The University of Moundou was established by Ordinance No. 013/PR/2008 on March 5, 2008. This ordinance repealed Law No. 10/PR/September 2, 2, 2002, which had established the IUTEM (Institut universitaire des techniques d'entreprises de Moundou).

IUTEM began operating in January 2004.

== Composition ==
The university comprises 4 faculties:

- Faculty of Letters, Arts, and Humanities (FLASH)
- Faculty of Science and Business Technology (FASTE)
- Faculty of Law and Legal Techniques (DTJ)
- Faculty of Exact and Applied Sciences (FASEA)

== List of Rectors ==
- 2015-2008: Mahmout Yaya
- since December 20, 2008: Danadji Issac

== See also ==
- Higher education in Chad
