= Iro Lake =

Lake in Chad

Coordinates: 10°06′N 19°25′E

Lake Iro
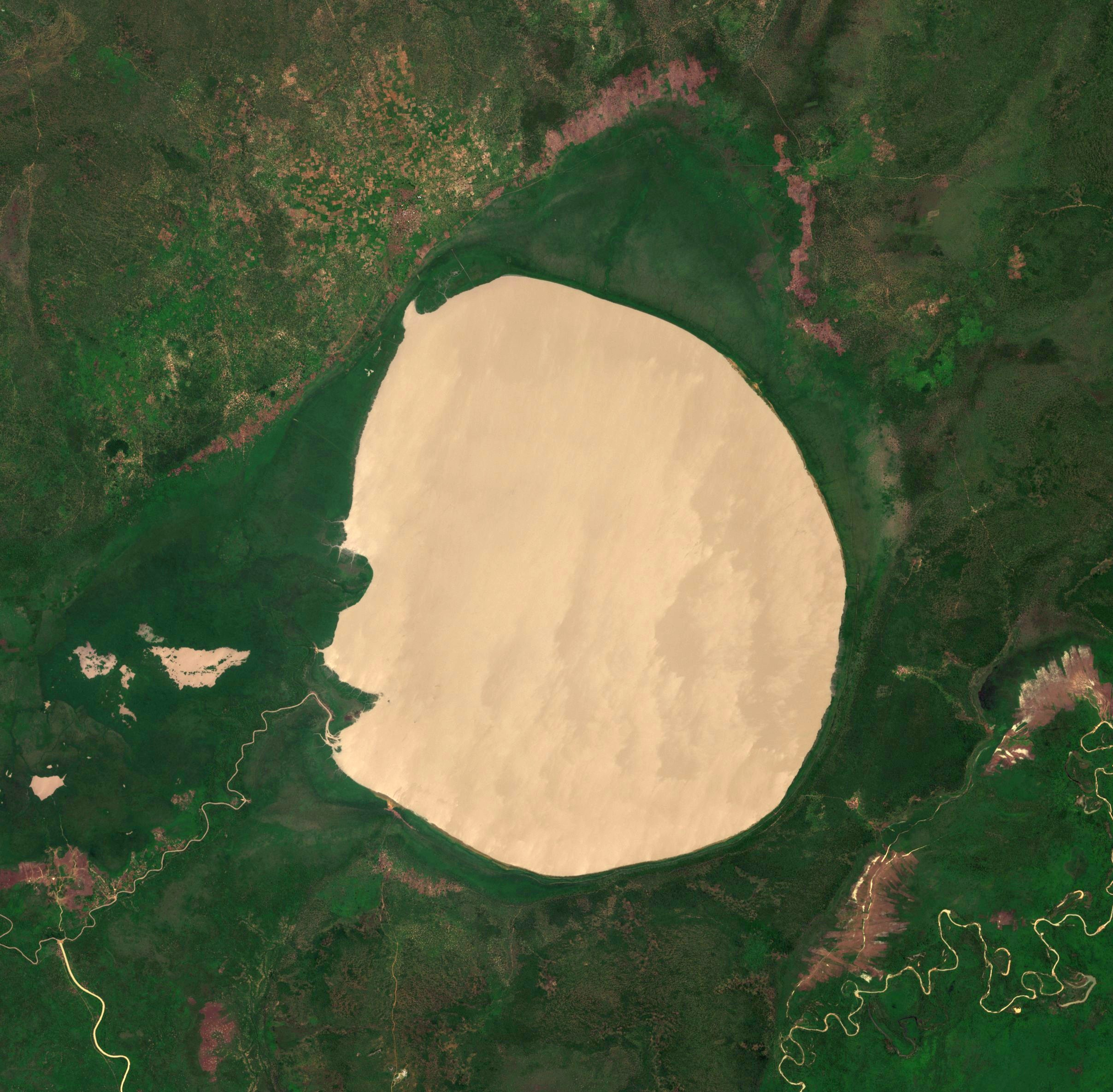
- Sentinel-2 image (2021)

- Location in Chad
- Location: Lac Iro Department, Moyen-Chari Region; Chad
- Primary inflows: Bahr Salamat
- Primary outflows: evaporation
- Basin countries: Chad
- Max. length: 13 km (8.1 mi)
- Max. width: 11 km (6.8 mi)
- Surface area: 110 km^{2} (42 sq mi)
- Surface elevation: 386 m (1,266 ft)
- Islands: no
- Settlements: Boum Kabir

Iro Lake (French: Lac Iro) is a cyclically occurring lake in the Moyen-Chari Region in southeastern Chad. It is fed in the summer and autumn months from the eastern arm of the Bahr Salamat, which forks seven kilometers southwest of the lake. The lake is about 100 kilometers north of the border with the Central African Republic. It is nearly circular, 13 kilometers long and 11 kilometers wide. During the dry season it can completely run dry.

It has been suspected that the depression is the remains of an impact crater.

== See also ==
- Bosumtwi Lake – a confirmed impact crater in Ghana
- List of lakes in Chad
