= Sarh =

City in southern Chad

Sarh ساره
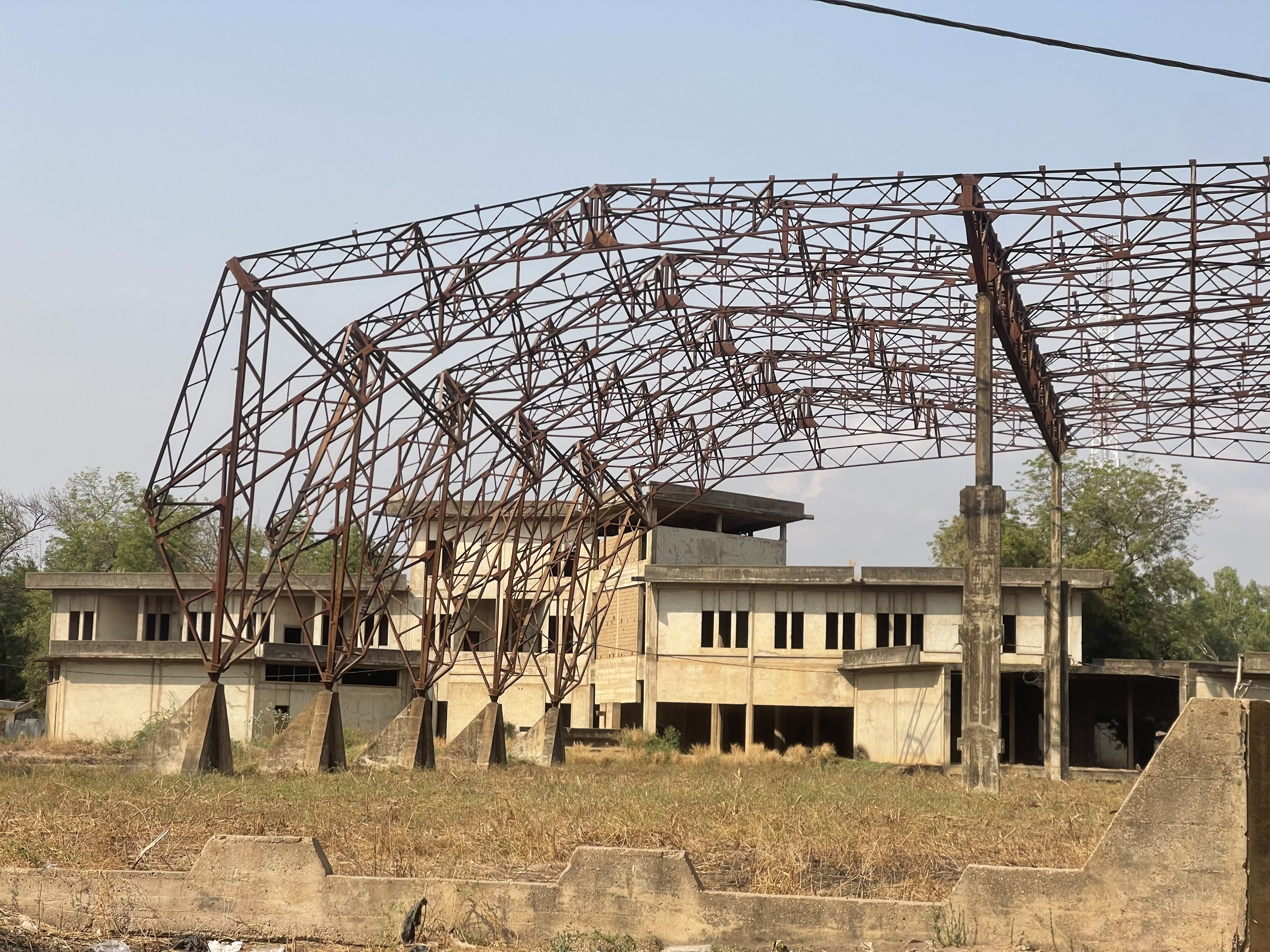
- The house of the former Chadian president François Tombalbaye in the city of Sarh.

- Location in Chad (Moyen-Chari region highlighted)
- Coordinates: 09°09′N 18°23′E
- Country: Chad
- Region: Moyen-Chari Region
- Department: Barh Köh
- Sub-Prefecture: Sarh
- Elevation: 347 m (1,138 ft)

Population (2012)
  - Total: 103,269
- Time zone: +1

Sarh (Arabic: ساره), formerly known as Fort Archambault (French pronunciation: [fɔʁ aʁʃɑ̃bo]), is the capital of the Moyen-Chari Region and the capital of the Department of Barh Köh in Chad. It is the third largest city in Chad, after N'Djamena and Moundou and lies on the Chari River, 563 kilometres (350 mi) by road southeast of the capital city N'Djamena.

The city was founded as Fort Archambauld by Émile Gentil and the colonial authorities of French Chad, then part of French Equatorial Africa, in 1897, and it was renamed Sarh in 1972. It is a centre for cotton production and fishing, and contains a large central open-market. It is served by Sarh Airport, a Cathedral and seat of the Catholic Diocese of Sarh, the Grande Mosquée de Sarh, and the universities University of Sarh and Saint Charles Lwanga University of Sarh.

== History ==
The city was founded as Fort Archambauld by Émile Gentil and the colonial authorities of French Chad, then part of French Equatorial Africa, in 1897, for returnees from the labour camps associated with the construction of the Congo-Ocean Railway. A significantly large textiles complex was constructed by the French in Fort Archambauld in 1967.

It was renamed to Sarh in 1972 during François Tombalbaye's authenticité campaign.

The residents of Sarh suffered a meningococcal meningitis epidemic in 1990.

== Geography ==
Sarh is located on the Chari River, 563 miles (906 km) by road southeast of the capital city N'Djamena. It was named after the Sara people of southern Chad.

It is the third largest city in Chad, after N'Djamena and Moundou.

=== Climate ===
Like other parts of southern Chad and the East Sudanian savanna, Sarh has a typical tropical savanna climate (Köppen Aw), with a wet season and a dry season and the temperature being hot year-round. The average annual high temperature is 34.9 °C (94.8 °F), while the average annual low temperature is 20.9 °C (69.6 °F). The hottest time of year is from March to May, just before the wet season starts. March has the highest average high at 39.1 °C (102.4 °F), while the highest average low is 24.7 °C (76.5 °F) in April. August has the lowest average high at 30.6 °C (87.1 °F), while December has the lowest average low at 16.4 °C (61.5 °F).

Sarh receives 969.3 millimetres (38.16 in) of rain over 86 precipitation days, with a distinct wet and dry season like most tropical savanna climates. December receives no precipitation at all, with almost no rain falling from November to March. August, the wettest month, receives 243.7 millimetres (9.59 in) of rainfall on average. August also has 18 precipitation days on average, which is the most for any month. Humidity is much higher in the wet season than the dry season, with February having a humidity at 29% and August having a humidity at 82%. Sarh receives 2737.3 hours of sunshine annually on average, with the sunshine being distributed fairly evenly across the year, although it is lower during the wet season. December and January receive the most sunshine, while July receives the least.

Climate data for Sarh (1991-2020, extremes 1931-present)
Month	Jan	Feb	Mar	Apr	May	Jun	Jul	Aug	Sep	Oct	Nov	Dec	Year
Record high °C (°F)	41.9 (107.4)	44.0 (111.2)	47.2 (117.0)	44.0 (111.2)	43.0 (109.4)	39.8 (103.6)	43.0 (109.4)	38.5 (101.3)	36.5 (97.7)	42.0 (107.6)	40.6 (105.1)	40.5 (104.9)	47.2 (117.0)
Mean daily maximum °C (°F)	36.1 (97.0)	38.8 (101.8)	40.2 (104.4)	39.5 (103.1)	36.6 (97.9)	33.5 (92.3)	31.7 (89.1)	31.0 (87.8)	32.0 (89.6)	33.7 (92.7)	36.1 (97.0)	36.2 (97.2)	35.4 (95.7)
Daily mean °C (°F)	26.3 (79.3)	29.3 (84.7)	32.0 (89.6)	32.6 (90.7)	30.6 (87.1)	28.3 (82.9)	26.9 (80.4)	26.3 (79.3)	27.0 (80.6)	28.0 (82.4)	27.9 (82.2)	26.5 (79.7)	28.4 (83.1)
Mean daily minimum °C (°F)	16.6 (61.9)	19.7 (67.5)	23.8 (74.8)	25.6 (78.1)	24.5 (76.1)	23.0 (73.4)	22.2 (72.0)	21.7 (71.1)	21.9 (71.4)	22.2 (72.0)	19.5 (67.1)	16.7 (62.1)	21.3 (70.3)
Record low °C (°F)	7.0 (44.6)	9.5 (49.1)	15.2 (59.4)	16.0 (60.8)	13.5 (56.3)	13.0 (55.4)	13.0 (55.4)	12.0 (53.6)	15.0 (59.0)	16.7 (62.1)	10.0 (50.0)	10.0 (50.0)	7.0 (44.6)
Average rainfall mm (inches)	0.1 (0.00)	1.6 (0.06)	9.5 (0.37)	37.4 (1.47)	82.1 (3.23)	135.9 (5.35)	234.4 (9.23)	243.7 (9.59)	165.5 (6.52)	55.8 (2.20)	3.3 (0.13)	0.0 (0.0)	969.3 (38.16)
Average rainy days (≥ 0.1 mm)	0	1	2	5	9	12	15	18	16	7	1	0	86
Average relative humidity (%)	33	29	37	50	61	72	79	82	80	73	57	42	58
Mean monthly sunshine hours	266.6	243.6	244.9	237.0	241.8	207.0	173.6	176.7	186.0	232.5	261.0	266.6	2,737.3
Mean daily sunshine hours	8.6	8.7	7.9	7.9	7.8	6.9	5.6	5.7	6.2	7.5	8.7	8.6	7.5
Source 1: Météo Climat
Source 2: World Meteorological Organization (rainy days), NOAA (sun, humidity and precipitation)

== Economy ==
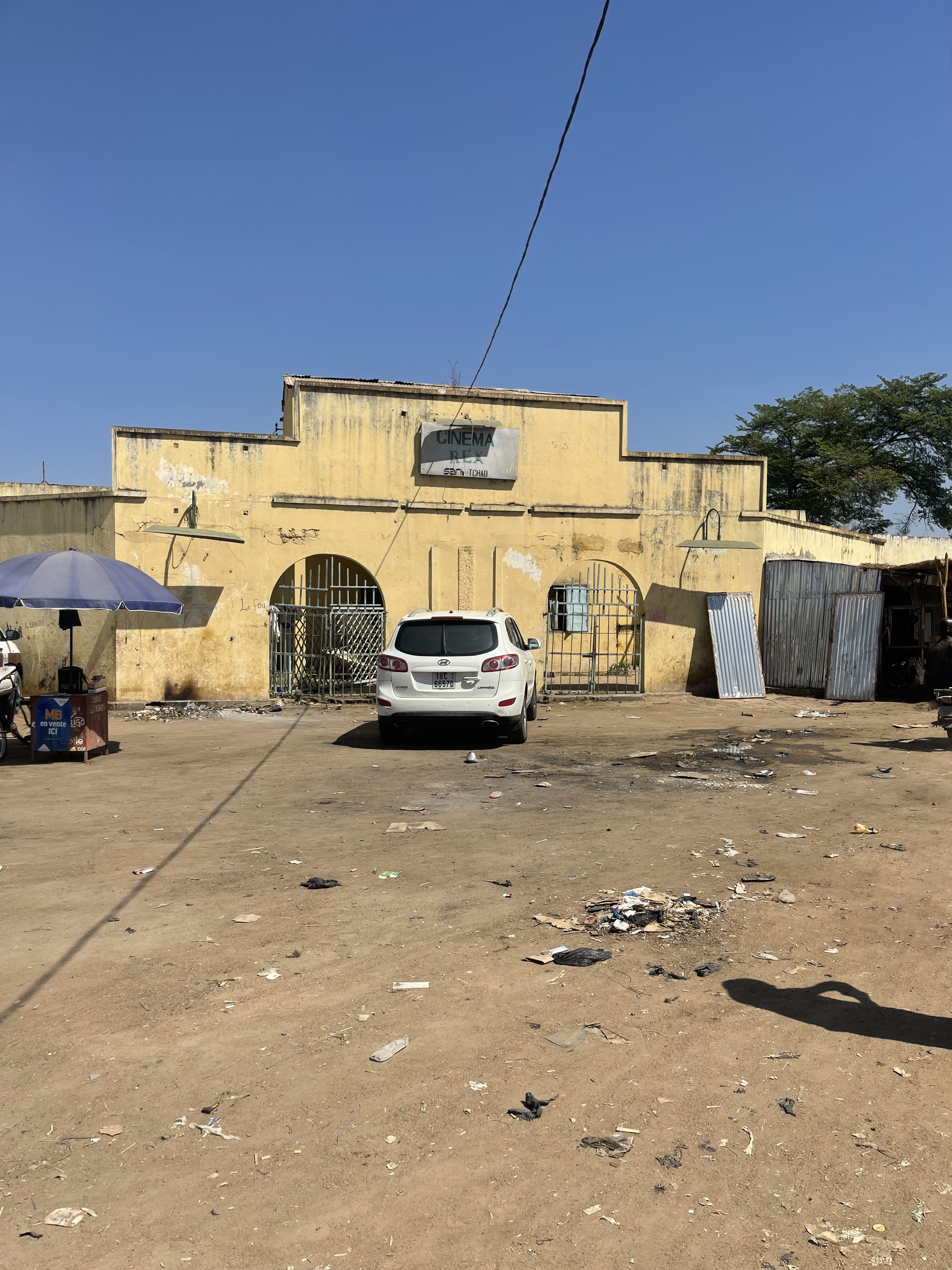
Rix cinema in Sarh

Sarh is now a major transport hub. It is served by the Sarh Airport (IATA airport code SRH). It is a center for the cotton industry, due to its warm and seasonally wet climate. It is also an important center for commercial fishing in the Chari River. The industry has been threatened by overfishing in the area, and APRODEPIT is working in Sarh to make fishing sustainable.

The main market in Sarh is the Marché central de Sarh, an open-air market in the city centre which sells fresh fish, cotton, fruits and textiles. Small workshops can be found in the city which specialize in wood carving, weaving, and arts and crafts.

== Landmarks ==
The city contains a Cathedral, which is the seat of the Catholic Diocese of Sarh and the Grande Mosquée de Sarh. It also contains the Sarh National Museum.

== Demographics ==
Year	Population
1993	75,496
2008	108,061

== Education ==
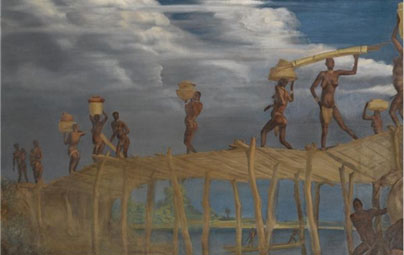
Fort Archambault bridge, in 1926.

Sarh is home to various educational institutions:

=== High schools ===
Lycées−High schools include:

- Lycée Ahmed Mangué (public)
- Lycée-Collège Charles Lwanga (private, Catholic)
- Lycée-Collège Humanité (private, Baptist)

=== Universities ===
- IUSAES—Institut Universitaire des Sciences Agronomiques et de l'Environnement de Sarh — a tertiary college, established in 1997.
- University of Sarh — a public university, established in 2010
- ISMEA—Institute of Science of Management and Economic Applied — founded by NGOs, established in 2008.
- Saint Charles Lwanga University of Sarh — established in 2018

== Twin towns—Sister cities ==
Sarh is twinned with:

- Cherbourg-Octeville, France (since 2001)

== Notable people ==
- Fatimé Dordji (1949-2016) - businesswoman and journalist
- Empress Catherine of Central Africa (born 1949), Empress Consort, Wife of Emperor Jean-Bédel Bokassa I
- Félix Malloum (1932–2009), President of Chad (1975–1979)
- Samuel Mbairabé Tibingar (born 1972), Roman Catholic Bishop of Koumra
- Sosthene Moguenara (born 1989), track and field athlete

== See also ==
- Chari River topics
- Regions of Chad
