= ISO 639:z =

List of ISO 639-3 language codes starting with Z

This is a list of ISO 639-3 language codes starting with Z.

Index | a | b | c | d | e | f | g | h | i | j | k | l | m | n | o | p | q | r | s | t | u | v | w | x | y | z

Abbreviations are used in the table as follows:

- Scope: I = individual language, M = macrolanguage, S = special code
- Type: C = constructed, E = extinct (in recent times), H = historical (distinct from its modern form), L = living, S = special code

Deprecated codes are enclosed in (parentheses).

The column Family contains the generic English name of the language's family or macrolanguage.

ISO 639 codes			Scope/Type	Family	Language names	
639-3	639-1	639-2/B	Scope/Type	Family	Native	ISO name
zaa			I/L	Zapotec		Sierra de Juárez Zapotec
zab			I/L	Zapotec		San Juan Guelavía Zapotec; Western Tlacolula Valley Zapotec
zac			I/L	Zapotec		Ocotlán Zapotec
zad			I/L	Zapotec		Cajonos Zapotec
zae			I/L	Zapotec		Yareni Zapotec
zaf			I/L	Zapotec		Ayoquesco Zapotec
zag			I/L	Nilo-Saharan		Zaghawa
zah			I/L	Afro-Asiatic		Zangwal
zai			I/L	Zapotec	Diidxazá'	Isthmus Zapotec
zaj			I/L	Niger–Congo		Zaramo
zak			I/L	Niger–Congo		Zanaki
zal			I/L	Sino-Tibetan	Rouruo	Zauzou
zam			I/L	Zapotec		Miahuatlán Zapotec
zao			I/L	Zapotec		Ozolotepec Zapotec
zap		zap	M/L	Zapotec		Zapotec
zaq			I/L	Oto-Manguean	tizha'	Aloápam Zapotec
zar			I/L	Zapotec		Rincón Zapotec
zas			I/L	Zapotec		Santo Domingo Albarradas Zapotec
zat			I/L	Zapotec		Tabaa Zapotec
zau			I/L	Sino-Tibetan		Zangskari
zav			I/L	Zapotec		Yatzachi Zapotec
zaw			I/L	Zapotec		Mitla Zapotec
zax			I/L	Zapotec		Xadani Zapotec
zay			I/L	Afro-Asiatic		Zaysete; Zayse-Zergulla
zaz			I/L	Afro-Asiatic		Zari
zba			I/C	constructed		Balaibalan
zbc			I/L	Austronesian		Central Berawan
zbe			I/L	Austronesian		East Berawan
zbl		zbl	I/C	constructed		Bliss; Blissymbolics; Blissymbols
zbt			I/L	Austronesian		Batui
zbu			I/L	Afro-Asiatic		Bu (Bauchi State)
zbw			I/L	Austronesian		West Berawan
zca			I/L	Zapotec		Coatecas Altas Zapotec
zcd			I/L	Oto-Manguean		Las Delicias Zapotec
zch			I/L	Tai–Kadai		Central Hongshuihe Zhuang
zdj			I/L	Niger–Congo		Ngazidja Comorian
zea			I/L	Indo-European		Zeeuws
zeg			I/L	Austronesian		Zenag
zeh			I/L	Tai–Kadai		Eastern Hongshuihe Zhuang
zem			I/L	Afro-Asiatic		Zeem
zen		zen	I/L	Afro-Asiatic		Zenaga
zga			I/L	Niger–Congo		Kinga
zgb			I/L	Tai–Kadai		Guibei Zhuang
zgh		zgh	I/L	Afro-Asiatic		Standard Moroccan Tamazight
zgm			I/L	Tai–Kadai		Minz Zhuang
zgn			I/L	Tai–Kadai		Guibian Zhuang
zgr			I/L	Austronesian		Magori
zha	za	zha	M/L	Tai–Kadai		Chuang; Zhuang
zhb			I/L	Sino-Tibetan		Zhaba
zhd			I/L	Tai–Kadai		Dai Zhuang
zhi			I/L	Niger–Congo		Zhire
zhk			I/L	Deaf-community sign language (language isolate?)		Kurdish Sign Language
zhn			I/L	Tai–Kadai		Nong Zhuang
zho	zh	chi	M/L	Sino-Tibetan	中文; 汉语/漢語; 华语/華語	Chinese
zhw			I/L	Niger–Congo		Zhoa
zia			I/L	Trans–New Guinea		Zia
zib			I/L	isolate		Zimbabwe Sign Language
zik			I/L	Trans–New Guinea		Zimakani
zil			I/L	Niger–Congo		Zialo
zim			I/L	Afro-Asiatic		Mesme
zin			I/L	Niger–Congo		Zinza
(zir)			I/E	Niger–Congo		Ziriya
ziw			I/L	Niger–Congo		Zigula
ziz			I/L	Afro-Asiatic		Zizilivakan
zka			I/L	Austronesian		Kaimbulawa
(zkb)			I/E	spurious language		Koibal
zkd			I/L	Sino-Tibetan		Kadu
zkg			I/H	Buyeo		Koguryo
zkh			I/H	Turkic		Khorezmian
zkk			I/E	unclassified		Karankawa
zkn			I/L	Sino-Tibetan		Kanan
zko			I/E	Dené–Yeniseian		Kott
zkp			I/E	Macro-Jê		São Paulo Kaingáng
zkr			I/L	Sino-Tibetan		Zakhring
zkt			I/H	Mongolic		Kitan
zku			I/L	Pama–Nyungan		Kaurna
zkv			I/E	Uralic		Krevinian
zkz			I/H	Turkic		Khazar
zla			I/L	Niger–Congo		Zula
zlj			I/L	Tai–Kadai		Liujiang Zhuang
zlm			I/L	Austronesian		Malay (individual language)
zln			I/L	Tai–Kadai		Lianshan Zhuang
zlq			I/L	Tai–Kadai		Liuqian Zhuang
zlu			I/L	Afro-Asiatic		Zul
zma			I/L	Western Daly		Manda (Australia)
zmb			I/L	Niger–Congo		Zimba
zmc			I/E	Pama–Nyungan		Margany
zmd			I/L	Western Daly		Maridan
zme			I/E	Arnhem Land		Mangerr
zmf			I/L	Niger–Congo		Mfinu
zmg			I/L	Western Daly		Marti Ke
zmh			I/E	unclassified		Makolkol
zmi			I/L	Austronesian		Negeri Sembilan Malay
zmj			I/L	Western Daly		Maridjabin
zmk			I/E	Pama–Nyungan		Mandandanyi
zml			I/E	Eastern Daly		Matngala
zmm			I/L	Western Daly		Marimanindji; Marramaninyshi
zmn			I/L	Niger–Congo		Mbangwe
zmo			I/L	Nilo-Saharan		Molo
zmp			I/L	Niger–Congo?	Mpuun	Mbuun
zmq			I/L	Niger–Congo		Mituku
zmr			I/L	Western Daly		Maranunggu
zms			I/L	Niger–Congo		Mbesa
zmt			I/L	Western Daly		Maringarr
zmu			I/E	Pama–Nyungan		Muruwari
zmv			I/E	Pama–Nyungan		Mbariman-Gudhinma
zmw			I/L	Niger–Congo		Mbo (Democratic Republic of Congo)
zmx			I/L	Niger–Congo		Bomitaba
zmy			I/L	Western Daly		Mariyedi
zmz			I/L	Ubangian		Mbandja
zna			I/L	Niger–Congo		Zan Gula
zne			I/L	Niger–Congo		Zande (individual language)
zng			I/L	Austroasiatic		Mang
znk			I/E	Iwaidjan		Manangkari
zns			I/L	Afro-Asiatic		Mangas
zoc			I/L	Mixe-Zoquean		Copainalá Zoque
zoh			I/L	Mixe-Zoquean		Chimalapa Zoque
zom			I/L	Sino-Tibetan	Zo	Zou
zoo			I/L	Zapotec		Asunción Mixtepec Zapotec
zoq			I/L	Mixe-Zoquean		Tabasco Zoque
zor			I/L	Mixe-Zoquean		Rayón Zoque
zos			I/L	Mixe-Zoquean		Francisco León Zoque
zpa			I/L	Zapotec		Lachiguiri Zapotec
zpb			I/L	Zapotec		Yautepec Zapotec
zpc			I/L	Zapotec		Choapan Zapotec
zpd			I/L	Zapotec		Southeastern Ixtlán Zapotec
zpe			I/L	Zapotec		Petapa Zapotec
zpf			I/L	Zapotec		San Pedro Quiatoni Zapotec
zpg			I/L	Oto-Manguean		Guevea De Humboldt Zapotec
zph			I/L	Zapotec		Totomachapan Zapotec
zpi			I/L	Zapotec		Santa María Quiegolani Zapotec
zpj			I/L	Zapotec		Quiavicuzas Zapotec
zpk			I/L	Zapotec		Tlacolulita Zapotec
zpl			I/L	Zapotec		Lachixío Zapotec
zpm			I/L	Zapotec		Mixtepec Zapotec
zpn			I/L	Zapotec		Santa Inés Yatzechi Zapotec
zpo			I/L	Zapotec		Amatlán Zapotec
zpp			I/L	Zapotec		El Alto Zapotec
zpq			I/L	Zapotec		Zoogocho Zapotec
zpr			I/L	Zapotec		Santiago Xanica Zapotec
zps			I/L	Zapotec		Coatlán Zapotec
zpt			I/L	Zapotec		San Vicente Coatlán Zapotec
zpu			I/L	Zapotec		Yalálag Zapotec
zpv			I/L	Zapotec		Chichicapan Zapotec
zpw			I/L	Zapotec		Zaniza Zapotec
zpx			I/L	Zapotec		San Baltazar Loxicha Zapotec
zpy			I/L	Zapotec		Mazaltepec Zapotec
zpz			I/L	Zapotec		Texmelucan Zapotec
zqe			I/L	Tai–Kadai		Qiubei Zhuang
zra			I/H	unclassified		Kara (Korea)
zrg			I/L	Indo-European		Mirgan
zrn			I/L	Afro-Asiatic		Zerenkel
zro			I/L	Zaparoan		Záparo
zrp			I/E	Indo-European		Zarphatic
zrs			I/L	Mairasi		Mairasi
zsa			I/L	Austronesian		Sarasira
zsk			I/H	unclassified / Hatto-Kaskian?		Kaskean
zsl			I/L	unclassified		Zambian Sign Language
zsm			I/L	Austronesian		Standard Malay
zsr			I/L	Zapotec		Southern Rincon Zapotec
zsu			I/L	Austronesian		Sukurum
(ztc)			I/L			Lachirioag Zapotec
zte			I/L	Zapotec		Elotepec Zapotec
ztg			I/L	Zapotec		Xanaguía Zapotec
ztl			I/L	Oto-Manguean	Lapaguía-Guivini Zapotec	Lapaguía-Guivini Zapotec
ztm			I/L	Zapotec		San Agustín Mixtepec Zapotec
ztn			I/L	Zapotec		Santa Catarina Albarradas Zapotec
ztp			I/L	Zapotec		Loxicha Zapotec
ztq			I/L	Zapotec		Quioquitani-Quierí Zapotec
zts			I/L	Zapotec		Tilquiapan Zapotec
ztt			I/L	Zapotec		Tejalapan Zapotec
ztu			I/L	Zapotec		Güilá Zapotec
ztx			I/L	Zapotec		Zaachila Zapotec
zty			I/L	Oto-Manguean		Yatee Zapotec
(zua)			I/L	Afro-Asiatic		Zeem
zuh			I/L	Trans–New Guinea		Tokano
zul	zu	zul	I/L	Niger–Congo	isiZulu	Zulu
zum			I/L	Indo-European		Kumzari
zun		zun	I/L	isolate		Zuni
zuy			I/L	Afro-Asiatic		Zumaya
zwa			I/L	Afro-Asiatic		Zay
zxx		zxx	S/S			No linguistic content; Not applicable
zyb			I/L	Tai–Kadai		Yongbei Zhuang
zyg			I/L	Tai–Kadai		Yang Zhuang
zyj			I/L	Tai–Kadai		Youjiang Zhuang
zyn			I/L	Tai–Kadai		Yongnan Zhuang
zyp			I/L	Sino-Tibetan		Zyphe Chin
zza		zza	M/L	Indo-European		Dimili; Dimli (macrolanguage); Kirdki; Kirmanjki (macrolanguage); Zaza; Zazaki
zzj			I/L	Tai–Kadai		Zuojiang Zhuang

== Sources ==
- "ISO 639-2 Registration Authority". Library of Congress.
- "ISO 639-3 Registration Authority". SIL International.
- Lewis, M. Paul; Simons, Gary F.; Fennig, Charles D., eds. (2016). "Ethnologue: Languages of the World" (19th ed.). Dallas, Texas: SIL International.
