= Ju language (Chadic) =

Chadic language of Nigeria

Ju
- Native to: Nigeria
- Region: Bauchi State
- Native speakers: (900 cited 1993)
- Language family: Afro-Asiatic: Chadic; West; Barawa (B.3); Guruntum; Ju

Language codes
- ISO 639-3: juu
- Glottolog: juuu1243
- ELP: Ju

Ju is a language from the West Chadian branch of the Chadic language family. The language is spoken solely in Bauchi State, Nigeria, and had approximately 900 native speakers in 1993. The language is unwritten.

== Classification ==
Ju is part of the Guruntum (Gurdung according to the work of Roger Blench) group of the South Bauchi language group, and is thus similar to the Guruntum, Tala, and Zangwal languages.

== General Information ==
The Ju language is spoken primarily in the village of the same name, Ju, which lies to the south of Bauchi. The village is in the Bauchi local government area in the state of Bauchi.

Ju shares language borders mostly with other West Chadic languages; Zangwal to the north, Tala to the northwest, the Polchi language cluster to the west, and the Kir-Balar language to the south. To the east, Ju borders the sprachbund of the Dulbu language.

Information on the number of speakers of the Ju language is varied: in 1971, Ju had around 150 speakers, and Ethnologue measured 900 in 1993. However, the Joshua Project, has reported that Ju is used solely among the older generation, while the youth are switching to Hausa.
