= Mantsi language (Nigeria) =

Language

Mantsi
- Mangas, Ma’as
- Pyik Mantsi
- Pronunciation: [pʲìk mántsì]
- Native to: Nigeria
- Region: Bauchi State
- Ethnicity: Mantsi people
- Native speakers: (100 cited 1995)
- Language family: Afro-Asiatic: Chadic; West Chadic; Barawa (B.3); Boghom; Mantsi

Language codes
- ISO 639-3: zns
- Glottolog: mang1416
- ELP: Mangas

Mantsi
- People: mántsì
- Language: pʲìk mántsì

Mantsi (also known as Ma’as or Mangas) is an endangered Afro-Asiatic language spoken in Mangas town in Bauchi State, Nigeria. Blench (2020) reports that it is also called Mantsi. According to Blench, the structure of Mantsi differs significantly from the other South Bauchi languages.

Word lists of Mantsi had previously been published in Kiyoshi Shimizu's (1978) South Bauchi survey, which first mentioned the existence of the language. An unpublished word list was also recorded by Ronald Cosper (n.d.).

== Names ==
Mantsi speakers refer to their language as Pyik Mantsi [pʲìk mántsì], and to themselves as the Mantsi [mántsì] people. Although there are fewer than 1,000 speakers, the language is still being spoken by children.

== Demographics ==
Mantsi is spoken in the single village of Mantsi (locally known as Maɗana [mánànā] or Ma’as [màʔās]) in the southern part of Bauchi LGA, Bauchi State. The Kir [Kyiir] and Laar peoples, who speak closely related but distinct languages, live just to the northeast of Mantsi village in the nearby villages of Kir and Laar, respectively.

== Classification ==
Mantsi belongs to the Kir branch of the South Bauchi languages. It is most closely related to Kir and Laar, as shown by the lexical comparisons below.

Gloss	Mantsi	Kir	Laar
ash	múrə̀m	ŋúreŋ	ŋŋoro
bird	ɗōōr	dot	ɗwoot
blood	púrùm	pirə̀ŋ	firàŋ
bone	gùl	gwàŋàl	gwaŋal
fat	gìndɨ́r	yində̀r	yində̀r
leg	wāsɨ̄m	wasəm	wasəm
moon	pʲāŋ	pyaŋ	pyaŋ
mountain	lamba	lamba	lamba
stone	pʲār	pyat	pyat
kill	túk	tuk	tuk

Mantsi also has some lexical innovations, which are:

Gloss	Mantsi
fish	kʲáálòŋ
night	dāːhùr
path	da᷄n
nine	krōmsā

== Phonology ==
Mantsi has 3 level tones, as well as rising and falling contour tones.

== Grammar ==
Number is not marked morphologically.

== Lexicon ==
=== Plants and animals ===
Some Mantsi names of plants and animals:

Mantsi name	Mantsi name in IPA	English name	Scientific name
alade nawe	àládè náwè	bush pig	
anggulu	àŋgùlú	vulture	Necrosyrtes monachus
asha	áʃà	acha; fonio	Digitaria exilis
baanpɨri	bàːnpɨŕ ì	patas monkey	Erythrocebus patas
bagərəm	bàgə̀rə̀m	spitting cobra	Naja nigricollis
banggira	bàŋgìrà	monitor lizard	
banyangwe	bàɲāŋwé	jackal	Canis adustus
bapakɨr	bàpākɨŕ	leopard	Panthera pardus
barasa	bàràsā	risga	Plectranthus esculentus
busha	búʃá	hedgehog	Atelerix albiventris
bəbaamkam	bə̀bàːmkām	agama lizard	
ɓal	ɓāl	bean; cowpea	Vigna unguiculata
ɓalyagho	ɓàljáɣò	chameleon	
ɓar	ɓār	pumpkin	Cucurbita pepo
ɓarwak	ɓàrʷāk	rock python	Python sebae
ɓauna	ɓáwná	buffalo	Syncerus caffer
ɓiikhi	ɓíːxì	silk-cotton tree sp.	
ɓindɨr	ɓīndɨr̄	scorpion	
ɓoko	ɓókò	baobab	Adansonia digitata
ɓonggutər	ɓòŋgútə̄r	grasscutter; cane rat	Thryonomys swinderianus
dabra	dàbrà	shea tree	Vitellaria paradoxa
ɗeesi	ɗéːsì	tamarind	Tamarindus indica
gar	gàr	black monkey	Cercopithecus tantalus
giginya	gígíɲà	fan palm	Borassus aethiopum
giler	gílēr	weaver bird	Ploceus cucullatus
goprang	gòpràŋ	okra	Abelmoschus esculentus
gwomli	gʷòmlì	pouched rat, giant rat	Cricetomys gambianus
gyerwul	gʲérwúl	spiral cowpea	Vigna unguiculata
hangkaka	hànkákà	pied crow	Corvus albus
hom	ho᷄m	baboon	Papio anubis
hur	hùr	porcupine	Hystrix cristata
iski wandɨr	ískì wàndɨr̀	Angolan green snake	Philothamnus angolensis
kambong	kāmbôŋ	cocoyam	Colocasia esculenta
koon	kōːn	bush fowl; francolin	Francolinus
kursi	kūrsī	sorrel; roselle	Hibiscus esculentus
kwongsi	kʷóŋsì	garden egg	Solanum incanum
kyap	kʲâp	beniseed; sesame	Sesamum indicum
kyoor	kʲóːr	crocodile	Crocodylus suchus
lalo	lálò	Jews' mallow	Corchorus olitorius
lɨng	lɨŋ̂	elephant	Elephas maximus
maiwa	màjwā	millet sp.	
mam bakin	mám bàkìn	aerial yam	Dioscorea bulbifera
mam nawe	mám nàwè	bush yam	Dioscorea sp.
min	mīn	locust bean	Parkia biglobosa
ndyaar	ndʲáār	house bat	Scotophilus sp.
nnyan	ɲɲân	black plum	Vitex doniana
rama	rámà	kenaf	Hibiscus cannabinus
rimi	rímí	silk-cotton tree	Ceiba pentandra
rwaknisisan barina	rʷàknísīsān bàrīnā	royal python	Python regius
sham	ʃàm	guinea fowl	Numida meleagris
shin	ʃìn	dassie, rock rabbit, rock hyrax	Procavia capensis
shuwaka	ʃùwākā	bitterleaf	Vernonia amygdalina
tlari	ɬàrì	ground squirrel	Xerus erythropus
tlari kɨɓaryam	ɬàrì kɨɓ́ àrja᷄m	Senegal galago	Galago senegalensis
twang	tʷáŋ	tigernut	Cyperus esculentus
wang	wāŋ	Bambara nut	Vigna subterranea

=== Numerals ===
Mantsi numerals:

Gloss	Mantsi
one	nə̄m
two	ɗīːn
three	wéːn
four	úpsí
five	tūːn
six	màɣà
seven	ɲíngí
eight	gàːmfí
nine	krōmsā
ten	zúp
eleven	sūlūŋ nə᷄m
