= Black plum =

Black plum is a common name for several plants and may refer to:

- Diospyros australis, native to eastern Australia
- Planchonella australis, native to eastern Australia
- Prunus domestica, the common cultivated plum
- Prunus nigra, native to eastern North America
- Syzygium cumini, native to south and southeast Asia
- Vitex doniana, native to Africa
