= Ju language =

Ju language may refer to:

- Ju languages (!Kung)
- Ju language (Chadic)
