= Polci =

Polci may be,

- Polci language
- Gerry Polci
