= Tala language =

Chadic language of Nigeria

Tala
- Native to: Nigeria
- Region: Bauchi State
- Native speakers: (1,000 cited 1993)
- Language family: Afro-Asiatic: Chadic; West; Barawa (B.3); Guruntum; Tala

Language codes
- ISO 639-3: tak
- Glottolog: tala1295
- ELP: Tala

Tala is a language from the West Chadian branch of the Chadic language family. The language is spoken in the central regions of Nigeria, and had approximately 1000 native speakers in 1993. The language is unwritten.

== Classification ==
Tala is part of the Guruntum (Gurdung according to the work of Roger Blench) group of the South Bauchi language group, and is thus similar to the Guruntum, Tala, and Zangwal languages.

== General Information ==
The Ju language is spoken in the villages of Kuka and Talan Kasa, which lie to the south of Bauchi. The village is in the Bauchi local government area in the state of Bauchi.

Tala shares language borders mostly with other West Chadic languages; Zangwal to the west, Ju to the southwest, Guruntum to the southeast, and the Gera language to the north and northeast. To the south, Ju borders the sprachbund of the Dulbu language.

In 1993, Ethnologue estimated the number of speakers of the language at a thousand, and the Joshua Project has estimated the number of speakers at 2,000.
