= KKR =

KKR may refer to:

- KKR & Co., a global investment firm
- Kolkata Knight Riders, an Indian Premier League franchise
- Rheinsberg Nuclear Power Plant (German: Kernkraftwerk Rheinsberg), first nuclear power plant in the former East Germany
- Kalkara, Malta, postal code KKR
- Kir-Balar language, an Afro-Asiatic language
- Korringa–Kohn–Rostoker method, a method used in electronic band structure calculations
