= Saya language =

Chadic dialect cluster spoken in Nigeria

Zaar
- Sayawa
- vik zaar
- Native to: Nigeria
- Region: Bauchi State, Plateau State, Kaduna State, Nassarawa State, Kogi State, Niger State, Abuja
- Native speakers: 300,000 (2013)
- Language family: Afro-Asiatic: Chadic; West; Barawa (B.3); Zaar; Zaar
- Dialects: Zaar (Vigzar); Sahng

Language codes
- ISO 639-3: say
- Glottolog: saya1246
- ELP: Zaar; Guus

Saya (Sayanci, Zaar) is a Chadic dialect cluster of Nigeria.

== Dialects ==
Dialects according to Ethnologue:

- Sigidi (Segiddi, Sigdi, Sugudi)
- Gambar (Gambar Leere, Kal, Lusa, Vigzar, Vikzar)

Blench (2019) also gives the name Guus.

== Etymology ==
The term "Sayawa" was the name issued to them by Hausa speakers "saya" in English means "buy", so Sayawa means "buyers" in Hausa. When Sayawa migrated from Chad to their present location, they were rich culturally, they were self-sufficient in farming and exchange of goods and services.

Whenever Hausa speakers want to sell goods, they normally said "let's go to 'sayawa' or 'buyers' surely they will not fail when it comes to purchasing. That is how the name Sayawa came into existence. To Sayawa speakers, 'Zaar' is their real name down from Chad to their present location. Zaar means "Person of the land", literally meaning person of self relying on farming.

== History of Sayawa ==
The Sayawa are said to have come far from the east to the present Chad Republic between the 9th and 13th centuries. It is believed that they migrated together with the Jarawa, Warjawa in Ningi Local Government Area, Famawa, Angasawa, Surawa, Mwagavul and Mupun in Plateau state, Kutumbawa in Kano State, Babur/Burra, Margi and Kilba in Borno and Adamawa states. There are great similarities of language with Warjawa, Babur/Bura, Kilba, Margi and Terawa. The Sayawa language is one of the Chadian group of languages. It is also believed that there was a strong relationship between Sayawa and Gobir (Hausa) because of the similarity of tribal marks.

The Zaar (sayawa) left Ngazargamu with their relations, namely: Jarawa, Warjawa, Femaway, Angasawa, Surawa, Mwaghavul, Mupun, Kutumbawa, Babur/Bura. (Gunn, 1956:22), Margi and Kilba (Meek, 1931-137 and 181) to various places but first briefly stopped at Biu to the wilderness now known as Duguri or Yankari area. The area then included the recent Alkaleri Local Government area and some parts of Bauchi Local government area (Zungur and Galambi Districts) and also Kanam Local Government council in Plateau State. It was from this area that sayawa divided themselves into various groups and proceeded to their present permanent settlements in Tafawa Balewa and Bogoro Local Government Area.

According to the interview with the Barayan Bauchi, Mallam Umaru Sanda in January, 1980, the Sayawa were formerly living in various hills before coming down to low land during the Jihad as result of peace treaty with the Jihadist. The first group went to Mwari/Bogoro hills; the second to Dazara Hills; the third to Sang/Marti Hills; the fourth to Wadi/Sara Hills; the fifth to Lusa/Sur/Dungah Hills; the sixth to Kulung/Gambar Hills; the seventh to Kundum/Wur Hills; the eight to Zari/Kwabti Hills and the last to Boi Hills. In almost every settlement in the hills, there were more than ten clans (Driberg, 1931:123).

Members of the first settlement included Bogoro, Mwari, Gwarangah, Bijim, Gambar Zugum, Bar, Kurum, Bom, Tudun Wadan-Gyara, Gobbiya, Yola, Badagari, Mingil, Ragami, parts of Basanshi, Dunga, Malar, Dashem SongSong and Wandi.

The second settlement, Dazara comprises 16 hamlets in Boi village and Dinki hamlets in Bogoro village.

The third settlement include Sang, Marti, Zuya, Yabra, Tafare, Goshe, Lim Hamlets, Zango, Tafare, Malima, Rafawa, etc.

The fourth settlement, Wadi/Sara, includes the Wadi and Sara hamlets and part of Rafawa, Lafiyan Sara, etc.

The fifth settlement, Lusa/Sur/Dunga, includes Lusa, Dungah, Malar, Sur (Tapshin), Gwaska, Ndit, Gizaki, Unguwar Galadima, Jigawa, etc. The Sayawa call Tapshin Sur, because Sur is their original name and most of them migrated from there. There is another Sur very close to Lusa and it is believed that their offspring are the people of Tapshin.

The sixth settlement, Kulung/Gamar, includes Gambar Lere and all the hamlets around Gambar and some parts of Bijim and Sabonlayi.

The seventh settlement, Kundum/ Wur, includes all Kundum and Wur hamlets including the Sayawa speaking areas surrounding the hills. Wur mean hill in Sayanci (the Sayawa language); the name Wur, therefore, denotes the people of the hill.

The eighth settlement, Zari/Kwabti, includes all the surrounding hamlets, otherwise known as Barawa. Barawa is another name for Sayawa in Jarawa language, so the entire Sayawa ethnic group is known as Barawa. Also, neighbours from the southern parts, that is Angas, call Sayawa "Morgi". The real name for the ethnic group is "Zaar" the Hausa call them Sayawa, the Jarawa call them "Barawa" and the Angas call them "Morgi". Others from the eighth settlement include Kwabti, Zari Babba, etc. Zari is the only Sawaya town that bears the name of the community as well as its village.

The ninth settlement, Boi, includes the remaining Sayawa speakers in Boi village, apart from the Dazara hamlets. Others include parts of Dashem Songsong, Malar Giji and Malar Daji. Many other settlements were later established.

Most of the Sayawa tradition or cultural heritage are organized during festivals, marriage and burial ceremonies.

== Notable Sayawa people ==
- Yakubu Dogara, former Speaker of the House of Representatives
