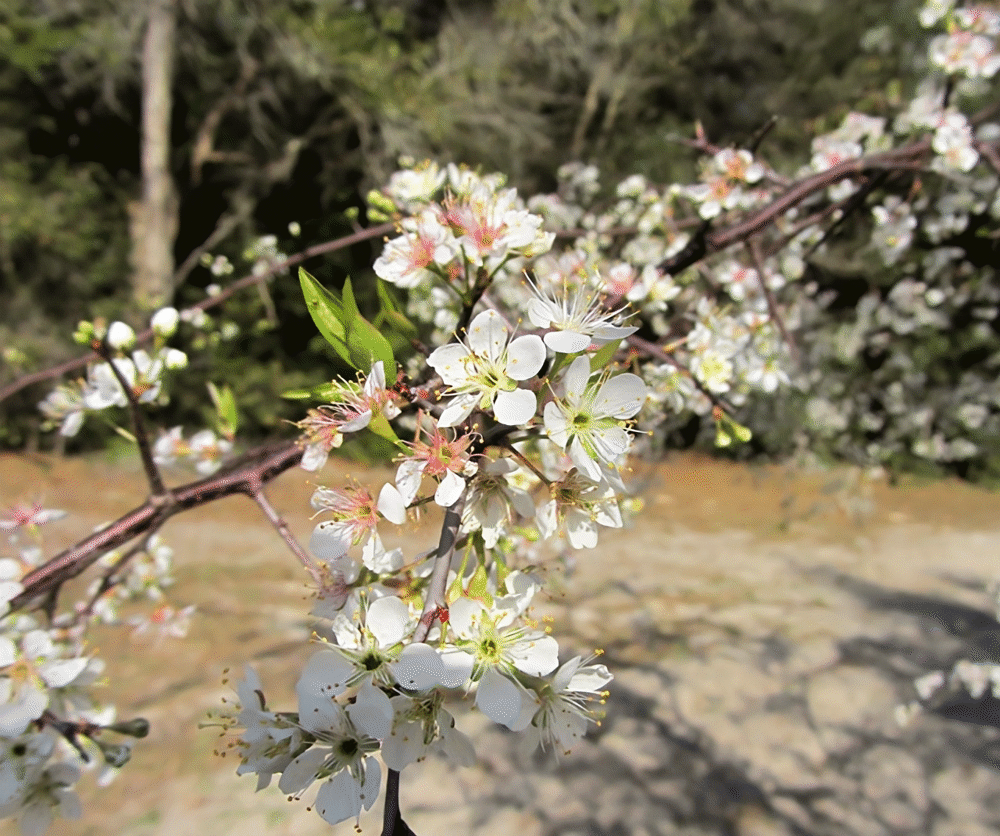

Conservation status
- Least Concern (IUCN 3.1)

Scientific classification
- Kingdom: Plantae
- Clade: Embryophytes
- Clade: Tracheophytes
- Clade: Angiosperms
- Clade: Eudicots
- Clade: Rosids
- Order: Rosales
- Family: Rosaceae
- Genus: Prunus
- Subgenus: Prunus subg. Prunus
- Section: Prunus sect. Prunocerasus
- Species: P. americana

Binomial name
- Prunus americana Marsh.
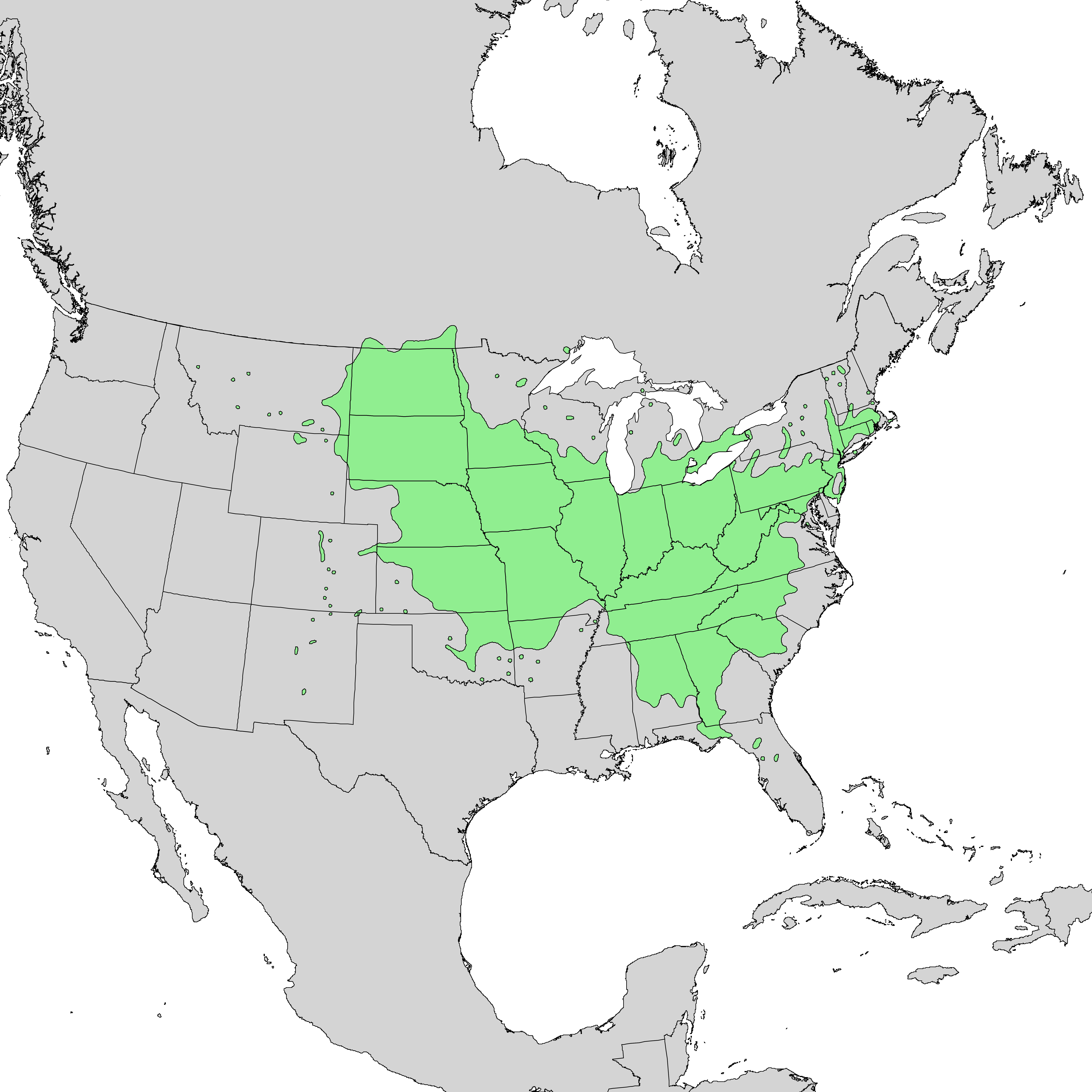
- Distribution of Prunus americana

Synonyms
- Prunus acinaria Desf.; Prunus coccinea Raf.; Prunus mollis Torr. (Note: Misapplied by some sources; authorities say Prunus mollis is a synonym of Prunus nigra.); Prunus hyemalis Michx.; Prunus mississipi Marsh.

= Prunus americana =

Species of tree

Prunus americana, commonly called the American plum, wild plum, or Marshall's large yellow sweet plum, is a species of Prunus native to North America.

Many cultivated varieties have been derived from the species. The fruit has a number of culinary uses and the domestic plum can be grafted to the rootstock. The fruit and roots were also used by Native Americans.

== Description ==
The American plum grows as a large shrub or small tree, growing at a moderate rate to 4.6 metres (15 feet) in height and 3 m (10 ft) in width. The roots are shallow, widely spread, and send up suckers. The branches are thorny. The green leaves are alternately arranged, oval, and 5–11 centimeters (2–4 1/4 in) long.

Blooming in spring, small white flowers with five petals occur singly or in clusters in the leaf axils. In summer, bright red globular fruits grow to about 2.5 cm (1 in) in diameter.

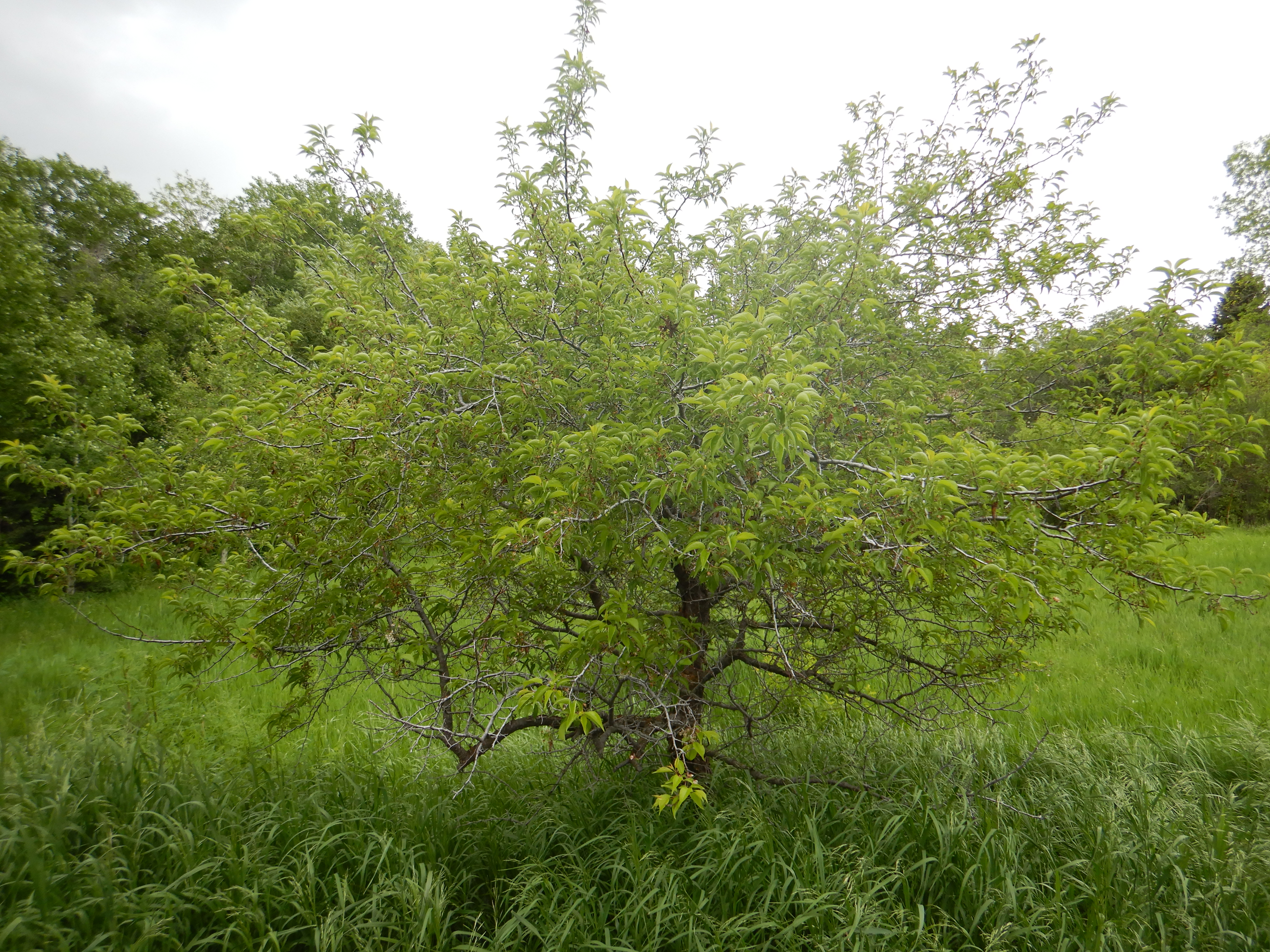
Habit

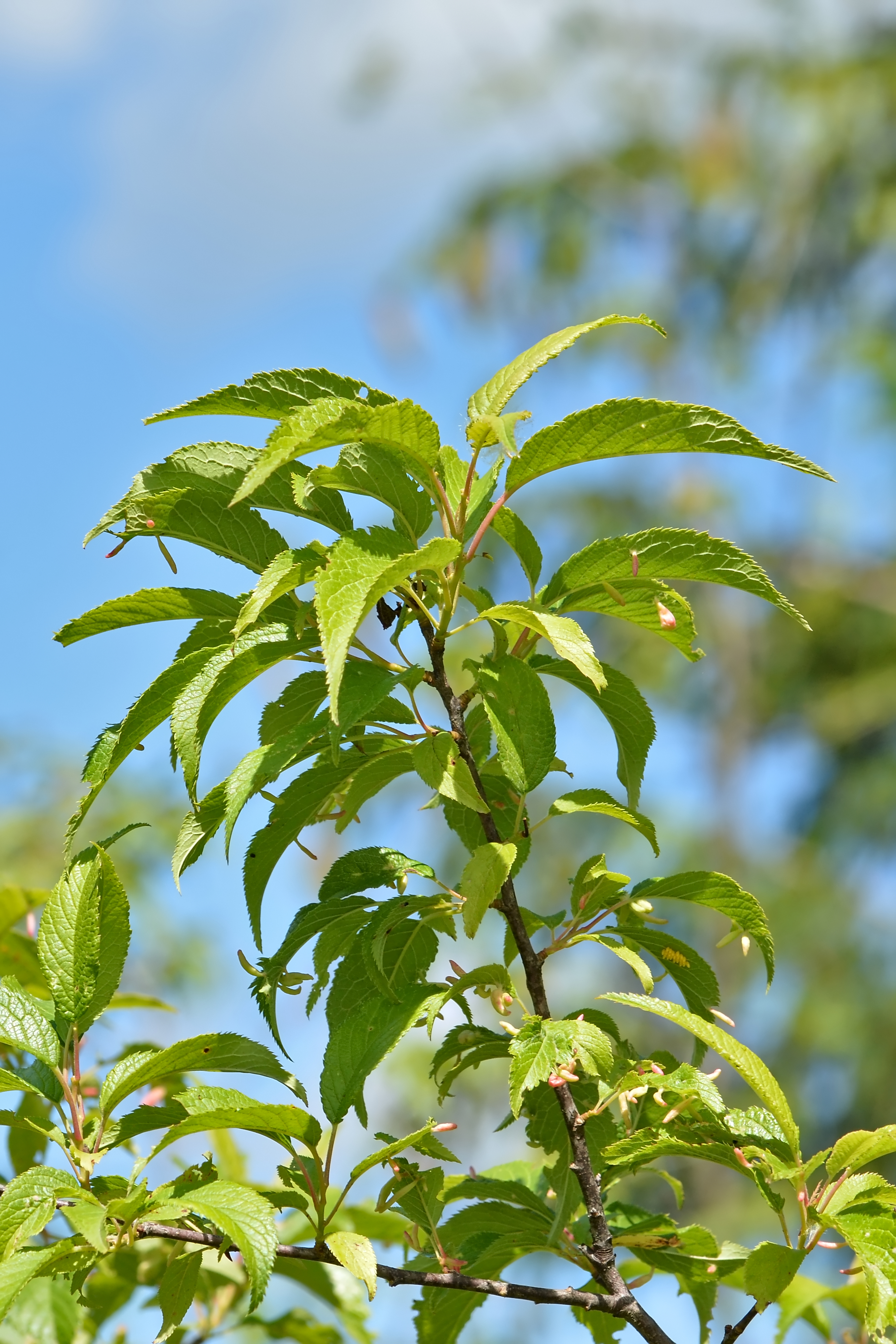
Foliage

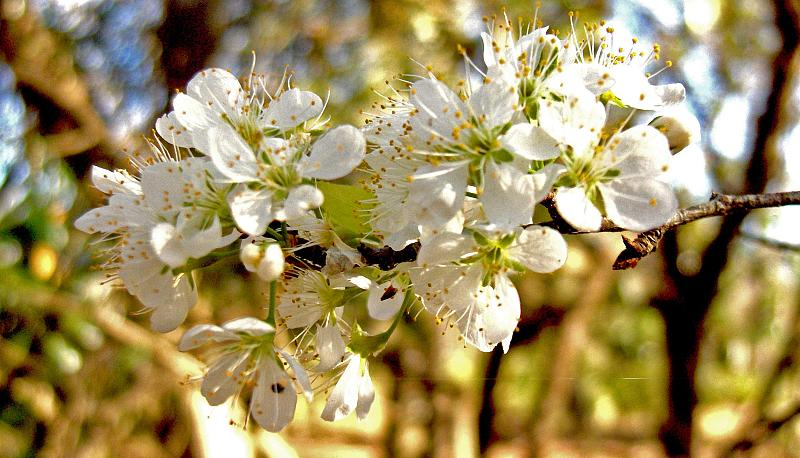
Flowers

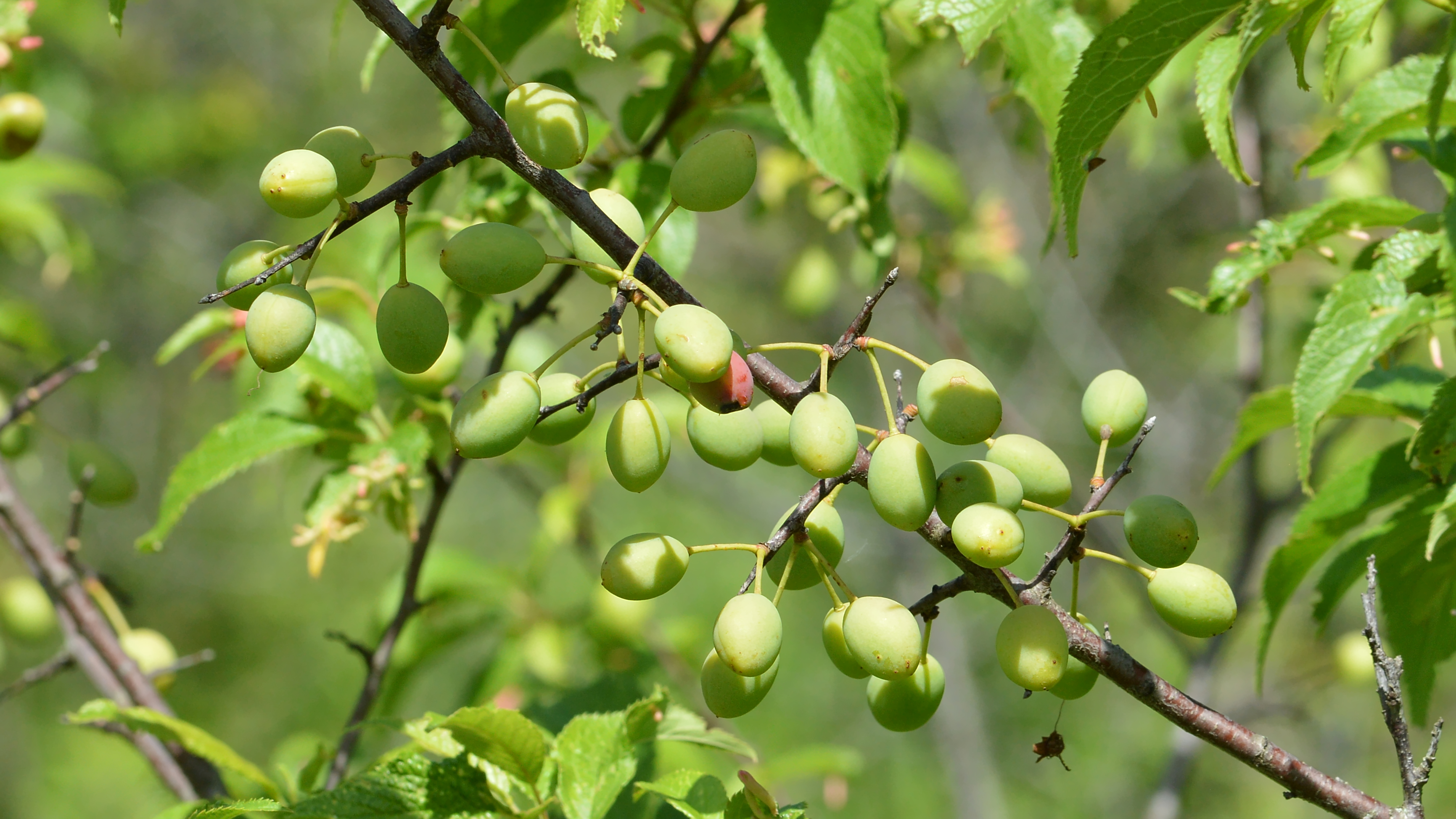
Unripe fruit

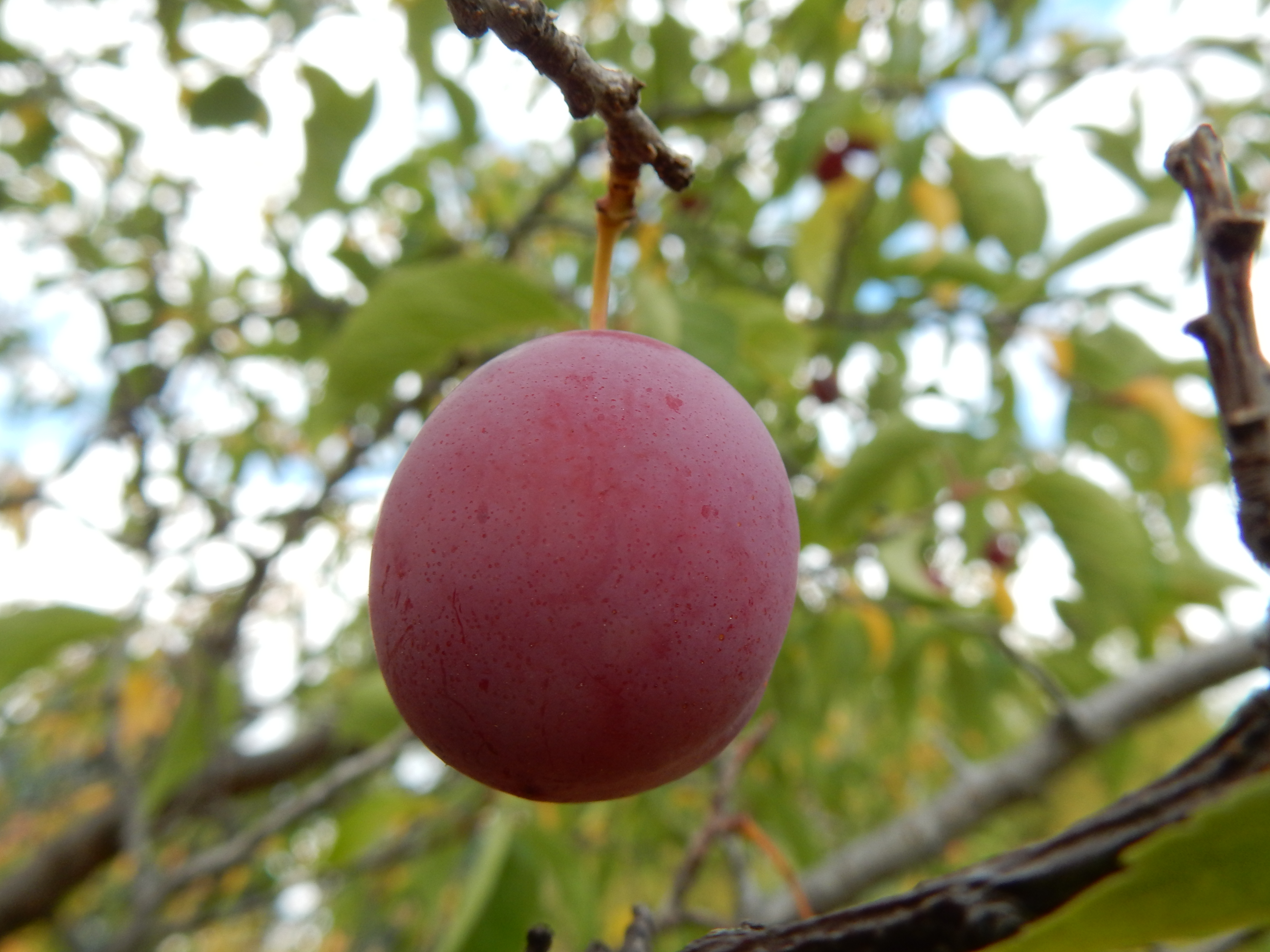
Ripe fruit

=== Similar species ===
Prunus nigra (Canada plum) is similar, but the fruit is comparatively yellow, smaller, and less round.

== Taxonomy ==
Prunus americana var. lanata Sudw is considered a synonym of Prunus mexicana, and Prunus americana var. nigra is considered a synonym of Prunus nigra.

Chickasaw plum (Prunus angustifolia Marsh.) hybridizes naturally with P. americana to produce P. × orthosepala Koehne.

In cultivation, many crosses have been made between American plum and other Prunus species, including Prunus persica, the peach.

== Distribution and habitat ==
The species is native to North America from Saskatchewan and Idaho south to New Mexico and east to Québec, Maine and Florida. It has often been planted outside its native range and sometimes escapes cultivation.

The plant is adapted to coarse- and medium-textured soils, but not to fine soils (silt or clay). It can survive harsh winters down to temperatures of −38 °F (−39 °C) and is tolerant of shade, with mild fire tolerance and no drought tolerance.

== Ecology ==
Many birds and animals eat the fruit, and both white-tailed deer and mule deer feed on twigs and leaves.

== Cultivation ==
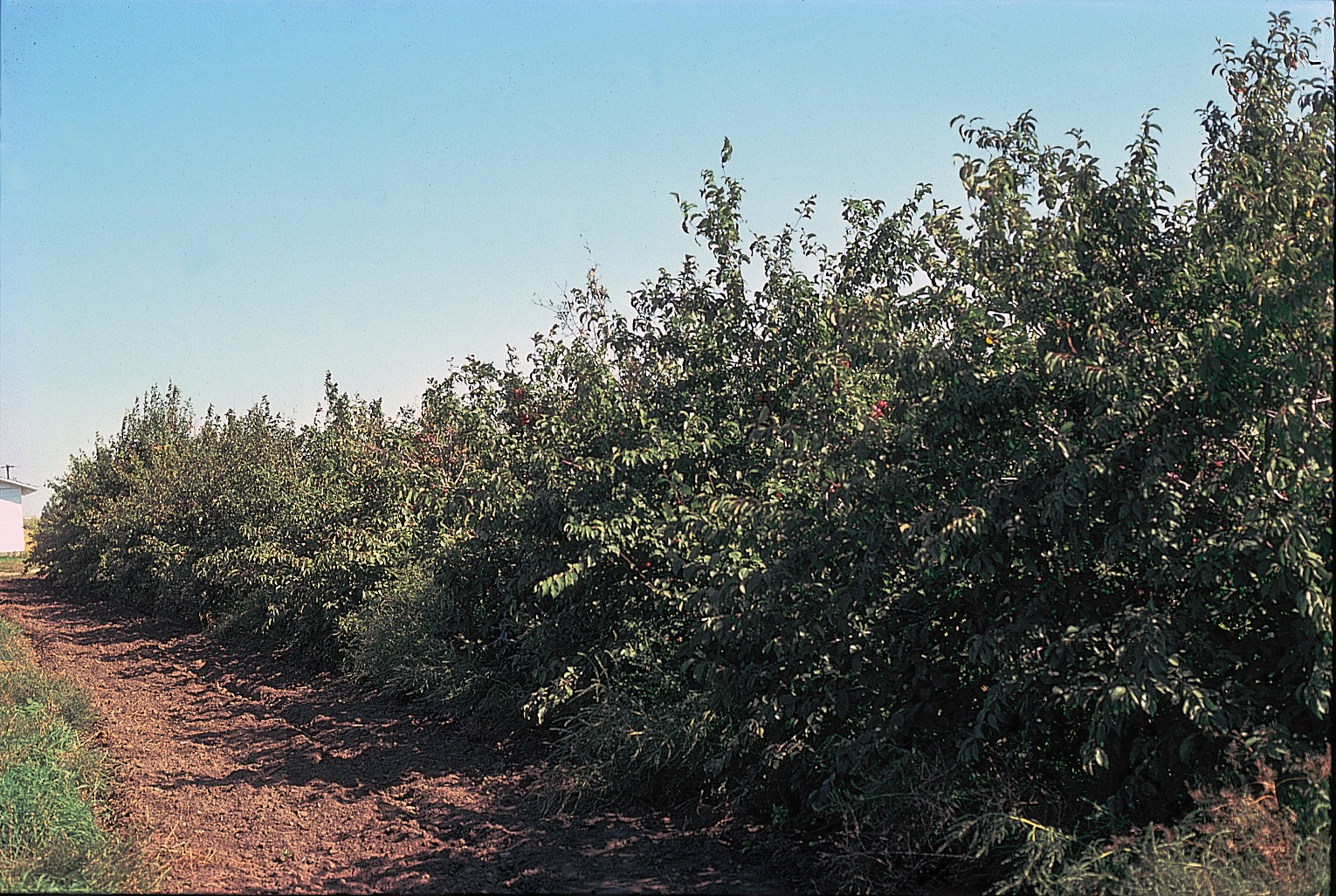
Trees growing

The white flowers are decorative in spring and its short, single leader makes it a popular residential landscape tree. According to botanist Charles Sprague Sargent,

As an ornamental plant P. americana has real value; the long wand-like branches form a wide, graceful head which is handsome in winter and in spring is covered with masses of pure white flowers followed by ample bright foliage and abundant showy fruit.

By 1950, over 200 forms had been selected for cultivation, with at least 50 cultivars known.

== Uses ==
The sour and sweet fruit is eaten fresh and is processed as preserves, jellies, jam and wine. The tree also forms an excellent rootstock upon which to graft the domestic plum. The Plains Indians and Cheyenne ate the plums; the latter used the branches for the Sun Dance. The Navajo used the roots to make a red dye.

Farms use medium to tall shrubs or trees for windbreaks, and highway or riverside plantings. Its high density of growth effectively reduces the wind velocity near the ground. Development of suckers from the root system makes American plum effective in stabilizing stream banks and gullies. It will tolerate several days of flooding. Some commercial properties plant the trees along the entrance road.

== In culture ==
Eastern Native Americans planted many trees, giving many places the name of Crab Orchard.
