= Dass language =

Afro-Asiatic dialect cluster of Nigeria

Dass
- Native to: Nigeria
- Region: Bauchi State, Plateau State
- Native speakers: (8,800 cited 1971 census)
- Language family: Afro-Asiatic: Chadic; West Chadic; Barawa (B.3); Zaar; Dass
- Dialects: Lukshi; Durr-Baraza; Zumbul; Wandi; Dot

Language codes
- ISO 639-3: dot
- Glottolog: dass1243
- ELP: Dass

Dass (also known as Barawa) is an Afro-Asiatic dialect cluster spoken in Bauchi State and Plateau State, Nigeria.

== Varieties ==
Blench (2019) lists varieties as belonging to the Dass cluster:

- Durr–Baraza
- Zumbul
- Wandi
- Dot
