= Zeem language =

Chadic languages spoken in Nigeria

Zeem
- Region: Bauchi State
- Native speakers: 400 (2003)
- Language family: Afro-Asiatic: Chadic; West; Barawa (B.3); Zaar; Zeem
- Dialects: Zeem (†); Caari; Danshe (†); Lushi (?); Dyarim; Tule (†)

Language codes
- ISO 639-3: Variously: zem – Zeem cxh – Chaʼari dsk – Dokshi dyr – Dyarim tvi – Tulai
- Glottolog: zeem1242 Zeem dyar1234 Dyarim dans1239 Chaari lush1256 Dokshi nucl1693 Tulai
- ELP: Zeem
- Dyarim

Zeem, or Chaari, is an endangered Chadic dialect cluster of Nigeria, whose speakers are shifting to Hausa. Dyarim is closely related.

The Zeem language is spoken in Toro LGA, Bauchi State. The Tulai and Danshe dialects are no longer spoken. It is also called Chaari, Dokshi, Dyarum, Kaiwari, Kaiyorawa, Lukshi, and Lushi.

Dyarim had been influenced by Beromic languages during a time when Beromic was more widespread.

== Varieties ==
Zeem-Caari-Danshe-Dyarim cluster varieties listed by Blench (2019):

- Zeem (extinct)
- Tule (or Tulai, extinct)
- Danshe
- Chaari
- Dyarim
- Dokshi (Lukshi, Lushi)
- Jimi

Blench reports in 2019 that only 3 very elderly speakers of the Dokshi (or Lukshi) language remain in the village of Lukshi, Bauchi State.
