= Boghom language =

Afro-Asiatic language of Nigeria

Boghom
- Native to: Nigeria
- Region: Plateau State
- Native speakers: (50,000 cited 1973)
- Language family: Afro-Asiatic: Chadic; West Chadic; Barawa (B.3); Boghom languages; Boghom

Language codes
- ISO 639-3: bux
- Glottolog: bogh1241

Boghom (also known as Bogghom, Bohom, Burom, Burum, Burrum; the Hausa people calls it Burmawa, Borrom, Boghorom, Bokiyim) is an Afro-Asiatic language spoken by the majority of people in Kanam & Wase local government of Plateau State, Nigeria.

The Boghom people are mostly farmers, though some of them engage in rearing animals. Historically, hunting was a major occupation of the people as well.

Boghom is one of eight languages featured in Ronald Cosper's Barawa Lexicon: Jimi, Zul, Geji, Polci, Dott, Sayanci, Buli and Boghom.
