= South Bauchi languages =

Chadic language family sub-branch

South Bauchi
- Barawa; B.3 West Chadic
- Geographic distribution: Toro, Dass, Tafawa Balewa, Bauchi LGAs of Bauchi State and Kanam Plateau, Wase Plateau in Plateau State, Nigeria
- Linguistic classification: Afro-Asiatic: Chadic; West; South Bauchi
- Proto-language: Proto-South Bauchi

Language codes
- Glottolog: west2800
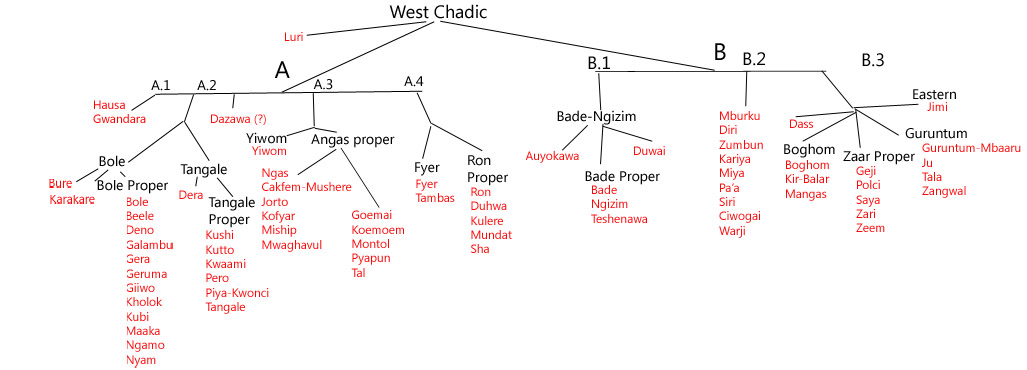
- West Chadic per Newman (1977)

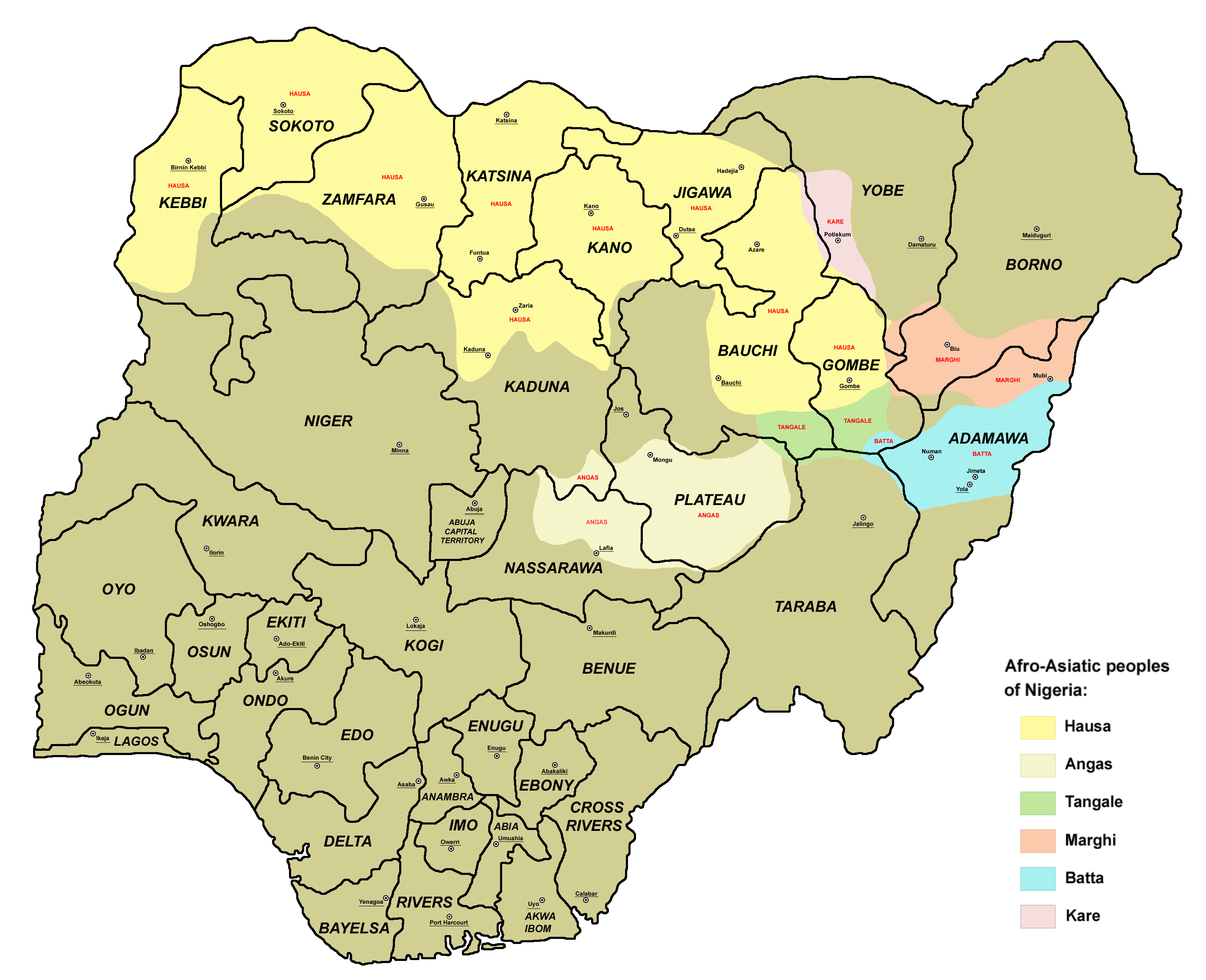
Main Chadic-speaking peoples in Nigeria

The South Bauchi languages (also called the B.3 West Chadic or Barawa languages) are a branch of West Chadic languages that are spoken in Bauchi State and Plateau State, Nigeria.

An extensive lexical survey of the South Bauchi languages had been carried out by Kiyoshi Shimizu from 1974 to 1975. Another early survey was that of Gowers (1907), which included 42 languages of Bauchi.

== Languages ==
The South Bauchi languages include:

South Bauchi languages

- Zaar group: Dass; Geji, Polci (Polchi), Saya, Zari, Zeem
- Guruntum group: Guruntum-Mbaaru, Ju, Tala, Zangwal
- Boghom group: Jimi, Jum; Boghom, Kir-Balar, Mangas

Roger Blench (2020) counted around 38 South Bauchi languages.

== Internal classification ==
=== Shimizu (1978) ===
Shimizu (1978) classifies the South Bauchi languages as follows. Individual languages are highlighted in italics.

- South Bauchi
  - East branch
    - Boghom subgroup
      - Bòghòm (Burrum)
      - Kir cluster
        - Kiir (Kir); Laàr (Balàr)
        - Mánsi (Mangas)
    - Guruntum subgroup
      - Guruntum cluster
        - Mbaarù
        - Gùrùntùm
      - Tala cluster
        - Sòòr (Zaŋwal); Zaŋwal of Zungur
        - Lungu (Tala)
        - Shò (Jù); Jimi
  - West branch
    - Barawa subgroup
      - North Barawa
        - Geji cluster
          - Mɨ̀gang (Booluu), Pelu; Gyaanzi (Gèèjì)
          - Buu (Zàràndaa)
        - Polci cluster
          - Zùl; Barang (Baram), Dììr (Baram Dutse)
          - Bɨ̀lɨ̀ (Bùlì); Nyámzàx (Laŋas), Lundur; Posɨ (Polci)
      - South Barawa
        - Zeem cluster
          - Zeem; Tule (Tulai); Chaari
          - Dokshì (Lushi)
        - Dass cluster
          - Dɨkshi (Bàraza?); Bàndas (Dur)
          - Boòdlɨ (Zumbul); Wangdày (Wanɗì); Zòdì (Dwàt)
        - Saya cluster
          - Zàksɨ̀ (Zàkshì); Bòòt (Boto); Zaarɨ (Zari); Sigidi
          - Zaar of Kàl; Zaar of Gàmbar Lèère; Zaar of Lùsa

=== Blench (2021) ===
Roger Blench (2021) classifies the South Bauchi languages as follows.

- South Bauchi
  - Jimi
  - Boghom cluster: Mantsi, Boghom, Kir-Balar
  - Gurdung cluster: Gurdung, Mbaaru, Ju, Tala, Zangwal
  - Zaar branch
    - Das cluster: Diksyhi, Dur, Zumbul, Dot, Wangdi
    - Polci cluster: Zul, Mbaram, Diir, Buli, Nyamzax, Polci, Luri (†)
    - Zeem cluster: Zeem (†), Tuli (†), Caari, Dyarim, Dokshi
    - Geji cluster: Megang, Pelu, Geji, Buu

== Names and locations ==
Below is a comprehensive list of South Bauchi language names, populations, and locations from Blench (2019).

Language	Branch	Cluster	Dialects	Alternate spellings	Own name for language	Endonym(s)	Other names (location-based)	Other names for language	Exonym(s)	Speakers	Location(s)	Notes
Aja (extinct)	Zaar	North Bauchi		Ajanci						Extinct: formerly spoken at Kworko, Bauchi State		no data
Das cluster	Zaar	Das							Ɓarawa	8,830 (LA 1971)	Bauchi State, Toro and Dass LGAs	
Lukshi	Zaar	Das			Dәkshi					1,130 (LA 1971)		
Durr–Baraza	Zaar	Das			Bandas					4,700 (LA 1971); 30–40,000 (Caron 2005)	Bauchi State, Das LGA, Durr and Baraza villages	
Zumbul	Zaar	Das		Boodlә					Zumbulawa, Dumbulawa	See Wandi	Bauchi State, Das LGA, Zumbul town	
Wandi	Zaar	Das		Wangday						700 (including Zumbul) (LA 1971)	Bauchi State, Das LGA, Wandi town	
Dot	Zaar	Das		Dwat	Zoɗi	shérә́m zoɗi	Dott			2,300 (LA 1971); a single large village. 37,582 (local census 2003). 7 wards (out of 11) speak Zoɗi	South of Bauchi on the Dass road	
Geji cluster	Zaar	Geji					Kayauri, Kaiyorawa		Ɓarawa		Bauchi State, Toro LGA	
Mәgang	Zaar	Geji		Bolu, Buli	Mәg̣ àŋ					1,250 (LA 1971), 'a few hundred' (Caron 2005)		
Pyaalu	Zaar	Geji		Pelu, Belu	Pyààlù							
Geji	Zaar	Geji			Gyaazә		Bagba		Gezawa, Gaejawa	650 (LA 1971), 1000 (Caron 2005). 20 villages (2007)	Toro, Bauchi LGAs, Bauchi State	
Buu	Zaar	Geji		Zaranda	Bùù					750 (LA 1971), 'a few hundred' (Caron 2002)		
Guus	Zaar	Guus						Ɓarawa	Sayanci	50,000 (1971 Schneeberg); 50,000 (1973 SIL)	Bauchi State, Tafawa Balewa LGA. West of Tafawa Balewa town.	
Guus	Zaar	Guus			mur gúús (one person); Gùùs (people)	vìì kә gúús (mouth of Guus)	Sigidi, Sugudi, Sigdi, Segiddi			775 (1950 HDG). 17 villages (Caron 2002)		
Polci cluster	Zaar	Polci							Ɓarawa, Palsawa	6,150 or more (1971)	Bauchi State, Bauchi and Toro LGAs	
Zul	Zaar	Polci	Zul is mutually comprehensible with Mbaram		Bi Zule	Nya Zule pl. Man Zule		Mbarmi, Barma	Zulawa	2,400 (LA 1971). 15 villages (2007)	Bauchi State, Bauchi and Toro LGAs	
Mbaram	Zaar	Polci		Barang, Mbaram						250 CAPRO (1995a). One settlement only	Bauchi State, Bauchi LGA	
Dir	Zaar	Polci		Diir						'a few hundred' (Caron 2005)		
Buli	Zaar	Polci		Bәlә						600 (LA 1971), 4000 (CAPRO 1995a), 'a few hundred' (Caron 2005)		
Langas	Zaar	Polci			Nyamzax		Lundur			200 (LA 1971), 'a few hundred' (Caron 2005)		
Luri	Zaar	Polci		Lúr						30 (1973 SIL), 2 (Caron 2002)	Bauchi State, Bauchi LGA	
Polci	Zaar	Polci		Posә, Polshi, Palci, Pәlci						2,950 (LA 1971); 70,000 (Caron 2005)		
Zaar	Zaar		Kal, Gambar Leere, Lusa	Zaʼr, Zar	Vìk Zaar, Vigzar	Zaar pl. Zàrsɛ̀		Sáyánci	Bàsáyè pl. Sáyáːwá, Saya, Seya, Seiyara [Saya terms are now considered derogatory]	50,000 (1971 Schneeberg); 50,000 (1973 SIL)	Bauchi State, Tafawa Balewa LGA. West of Tafawa Balewa town.	
Zari cluster	Zaar	Zari							Ɓarawa		Bauchi State, Toro and Tafawa Balewa LGAs; Plateau State, Jos LGA	
Zakshi	Zaar	Zari		Zaksә						2,950 (1950 HDG)		
Boto	Zaar	Zari		Boot					Bibot	1,000 (1950 HDG)		
Zari	Zaar	Zari					Kopti, Kwapm					
Zeem-Caari-Danshe-Dyarim cluster	Zaar	Zeem-Caari-Danshe-Dyarim							Ɓarawa		Bauchi State, Toro LGA	
Zeem (extinct)	Zaar	Zeem-Caari-Danshe-Dyarim								Extinct (Caron 2005)		
Tule (extinct)	Zaar	Zeem-Caari-Danshe-Dyarim							Tulai	Extinct (Caron 2005)		
Danshe	Zaar	Zeem-Caari-Danshe-Dyarim								Extinct (Caron 2005)		
Chaari	Zaar	Zeem-Caari-Danshe-Dyarim							Tulai	a 'few hundred' speakers (Caron 2005)		
Dyarim	Zaar	Zeem-Caari-Danshe-Dyarim			one person Mәn Dyarim, people Dyarim	Ndyarim Tә	Kaiwari			About 2000 ethnic Dyarim with about 100 fluent speakers (Blench 2005 est.)	Their main settlement is about 7 km south of Toro town in Toro LGA (N10˚ 02, E 9˚ 04).	
Lushi?	Zaar	Zeem-Caari-Danshe-Dyarim		Lukshi	Dokshi							
Jimi	Zaar									250 (LA 1971); 400 (1973 SIL)	Bauchi State, Darazo LGA	
Kir–Balar cluster	Boghom	Kir–Balar								360 (LA 1971) (Kir only)	Bauchi State, Bauchi LGA	no data
Kir	Boghom	Kir–Balar										no data
Balar	Boghom	Kir–Balar							Larbawa	50 CAPRO (1995a)		no data
Boghom	Boghom			Burom, Burrum, Burma, Borrom, Boghorom, Bogghom, Bohom, Bokiyim					Burumawa	9,500 (1952 W&B), 50,000 (1973 SIL)	Plateau State, Kanam LGA	
Mangas	Boghom			Maás						180 (LA 1971)	Bauchi State, Bauchi LGA	no data
Guruntum–Mbaaru	Guruntum		By settlements Dookà, Gàr, Gayàr, Kàràkara, Kuukù, and Mbaarù	Gurutum	Gùrduŋ					10,000 (1988 Jaggar)	Bauchi State, Bauchi and Alkaleri LGAs	
Ju	Guruntum									150 (LA 1971)	Bauchi State, Bauchi LGA	
Tala	Guruntum										Bauchi State, Bauchi LGA, Zungur district	
Zangwal	Guruntum										Bauchi State, Bauchi LGA	no data

== Phonology ==
Consonants

Like the other West Chadic languages, South Bauchi languages have a rich consonant inventory. They also generally have the lateral fricatives /ɬ, ɮ/, whereas the West Chadic A languages have not preserved such consonants.

	Labial	Alveolar	Alveolo-palatal	Velar	Glottal
Nasal	m	n	ɲ	ŋ	
Stop	p b	t d		k g	ʔ
Implosive	ɓ	ɗ			
Fricative	f v	s z	(ʃ) (ʒ)	ɣ	(h)
Tap		ɾ			
Approximant	w		j		
Lateral approximant		l			
Lateral fricative		ɬ ɮ			

Vowels

Blench (2020) proposes that Proto-South Bauchi had a 6-vowel system consisting of /i, ɨ, u, ɛ, ɔ, a/, with length contrast.

Tones

South Bauchi languages have 2-3 tone levels, with Proto-South Bauchi likely having three tones like the nearby A3 West Chadic languages. Some languages also have contour tones (falling or rising).

== Morphology ==
Like the neighbouring A3 West Chadic languages but unlike Hausa, South Bauchi languages do not usually have plural nouns, although certain words for persons such as ‘woman’, ‘child’, and sometimes ‘man/person’ have suppletive nominal forms. Blench (2021) hypothesises that this may be due to contact with Adamawa languages.

Stop consonants at the ends of morphemes are underlyingly voiceless.

== See also ==
- South Bauchi word lists (Wiktionary)
- Proto-South Bauchi reconstructions (Wiktionary)

== Bibliography ==
- Caron, Bernard 2002. Review of Ɓarawa lexicon: a wordlist of eight South Bauchi (West Chadic) languages: Boghom, Buli, Dott, Geji, Sayanci and Zul by Ronald Cosper, Munich: LINCOM EUROPA, 1999. Chadic Newsletter, 23: 46–80.
- Cosper, Ronald 1999. Barawa lexicon: a wordlist of eight South Bauchi (West Chadic) languages; Boghom, Buli, Dott, Geji, Jimi, Polci, Sayanci and Zul. (LINCOM Studies in African Linguistics, 39.) München: Lincom.
- Kraft, Charles H. 1981. Chadic Wordlists: Volume I (Plateau-Sahel). Marburger Studien zur Afrika- und Asienkunde: Serie A: Afrika, 23. Berlin: Dietrich Reimer.
