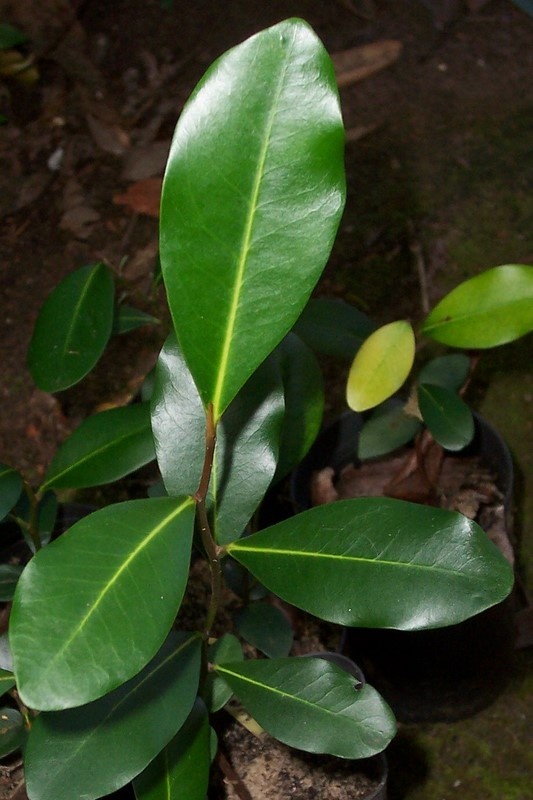
- Diospyros australis - juvenile

Conservation status
- Least Concern (IUCN 3.1)

Scientific classification
- Kingdom: Plantae
- Clade: Tracheophytes
- Clade: Angiosperms
- Clade: Eudicots
- Clade: Asterids
- Order: Ericales
- Family: Ebenaceae
- Genus: Diospyros
- Species: D. australis

Binomial name
- Diospyros australis (R.Br.) Hiern

Synonyms
- See text

= Diospyros australis =

Species of tree

Diospyros australis is the most southerly of the group of some 450 ebonies and persimmons. It is a shrub or small tree growing in rainforests of seaward eastern Australia.

Common names include black plum and yellow persimmon. "Grey plum", sometimes used for this species, usually denotes its northern relative D. pentamera.

Junior synonyms of D. australis are:

- Cargillia australis R.Br.
- Diospyros cargillia F.Muell.
- Diospyros microcarpa Gürke
- Maba cargilia F.Muell.

== Description ==
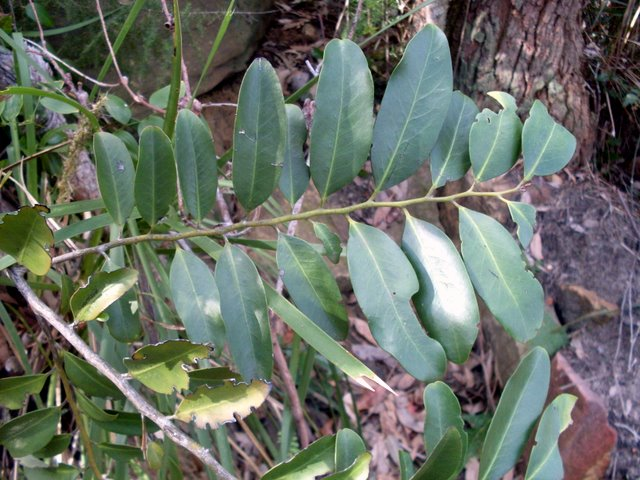
Diospyros australis at Barrenjoey

An attractive small tree, rarely reaching a height of 20 metres (66 ft) and a trunk diameter of 25 cm (10 in). The yellow tinged foliage and black berries make identification relatively easy.

The base of the tree is not flanged or buttressed. Bark on the cylindrical trunk is grey or black, with wrinkles, bumps and lines. Leaves are yellow or yellow-green underneath with a prominent yellow mid vein. Leaves alternate, smooth edged, elliptical or oblong 4 to 10 cm (4 in) long. Leaf stalks 2 to 5 mm long.

Flowers appear between October and December, being creamy green and four petalled. Female flowers being larger than male flowers.

The fruit matures in the months of February to July, being a shiny black berry, elliptical in shape, 12 to 20 mm in length. Around the base of the berry is a four or sometimes five lobed green calyx. A single seed is in each fruit, surrounded by edible purple aril.

Germination from fresh seed is slow, but reliable. After three months, the majority of seeds should germinate.

== Distribution and habitat ==
It grows in rainforests of seaward eastern Australia. The habitat is in a variety of different rainforest forms, though not often seen in the cool temperate rainforests. The range of natural distribution is from Durras Lake (35° S) near Batemans Bay in south east New South Wales, to Atherton (17° S) in tropical Queensland.

== Uses ==
The 1889 book The Useful Native Plants of Australia records that Indigenous people of the Illawarra area referred to the plant as "Booreerra" and it was a source of food.

Its edible berries are used in bushfood.
