= Zapoteco serrano, del sureste =

Zapoteco serrano, del sureste is a name used by INALI for a variety of Zapotec recognized by the Mexican government. It corresponds to two ISO languages:

- Yalálag Zapotec
- Yatee Zapotec

== Notes ==
- Belmar, Francisco. Cartilla del idioma zapoteco serrano.
