= Yalálag Zapotec =

Zapotec language of Oaxaca, Mexico

- Native to: Mexico
- Region: northern Oaxaca
- Native speakers: 3,500 (2005)
- Language family: Oto-Manguean: Zapotecan; Zapotec; Sierra Norte; Zoogochoan; Yalálag Zapotec

Language codes
- ISO 639-3: zpu
- Glottolog: yala1267

Yalálag Zapotec is a Zapotec language of Oaxaca, Mexico, spoken in Hidalgo Yalalag, Mexico City, Oaxaca City, Veracruz.

The Mexican government organization INALI recognizes both Yalálag Zapotec and Yatee Zapotec as a variety of Zapotec called Zapoteco serrano, del sureste.

== Sources ==
- Avelino, Heriberto. 2004. Topics in Yalálag Zapotec, with particular reference to its phonetic structures. UCLA Ph.D. dissertation.
- López, Filemón & Ronaldo Newberg Y. 2005. La conjugación del verbo zapoteco: zapoteco de Yalálag. 2nd ed. Instituto Lingüístico de Verano.
- Newberg, Ronald. 1987. Participant accessibility in Yalálag Zapotec. SIL Mexico Workpapers 9: 12-25.
