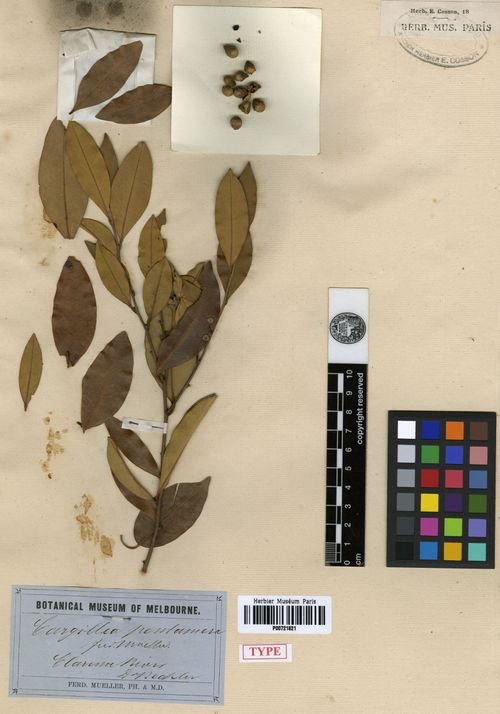
- Type specimen of Diospyros pentamera

Conservation status
- Least Concern (IUCN 3.1)

Scientific classification
- Kingdom: Plantae
- Clade: Tracheophytes
- Clade: Angiosperms
- Clade: Eudicots
- Clade: Asterids
- Order: Ericales
- Family: Ebenaceae
- Genus: Diospyros
- Species: D. pentamera

Binomial name
- Diospyros pentamera (Woolls & F.Muell.) F.Muell.

Synonyms
- Cargillia pentamera Woolls & F.Muell.; Maba pentamera (Woolls & F.Muell.) F.Muell.; Cargillia arborea A.Cunn. ex Hiern

= Diospyros pentamera =

Species of tree

Diospyros pentamera is a common rainforest tree in the ebony and persimmon family Ebenaceae. It occurs from near Batemans Bay (36° S) in New South Wales to the Atherton Tableland (17° S) in tropical Queensland, Australia. It is commonly known as the myrtle ebony, black myrtle, grey plum or grey persimmon.

== Description ==
Diospyros pentamera is a small to large rainforest tree, from 6 to 40 metres in height at maturity, and 60 centimetres in width at the base. It grows in various types of rainforests, but grows best in volcanic soils in fire free areas with high rainfall.

The leaves are 5 to 9 centimetres long, not toothed. Fragrant white flowers form in spring. The mid-sized edible berry matures around December to February and is eaten by many rainforest birds, including Brown Cuckoo Dove, Wompoo Fruit Dove, Rose-crowned Fruit Dove, Topknot Pigeon, Currawong, Regent Bowerbird and Australasian Figbird. Germination of fresh seed is quick, but occasionally unreliable. This tree is easily identified in the rainforest by the dark rough bark, which resembles the bark of Ironbark trees.

== Gallery ==
New growth

Foliage

Leaf undersides

Fruit
