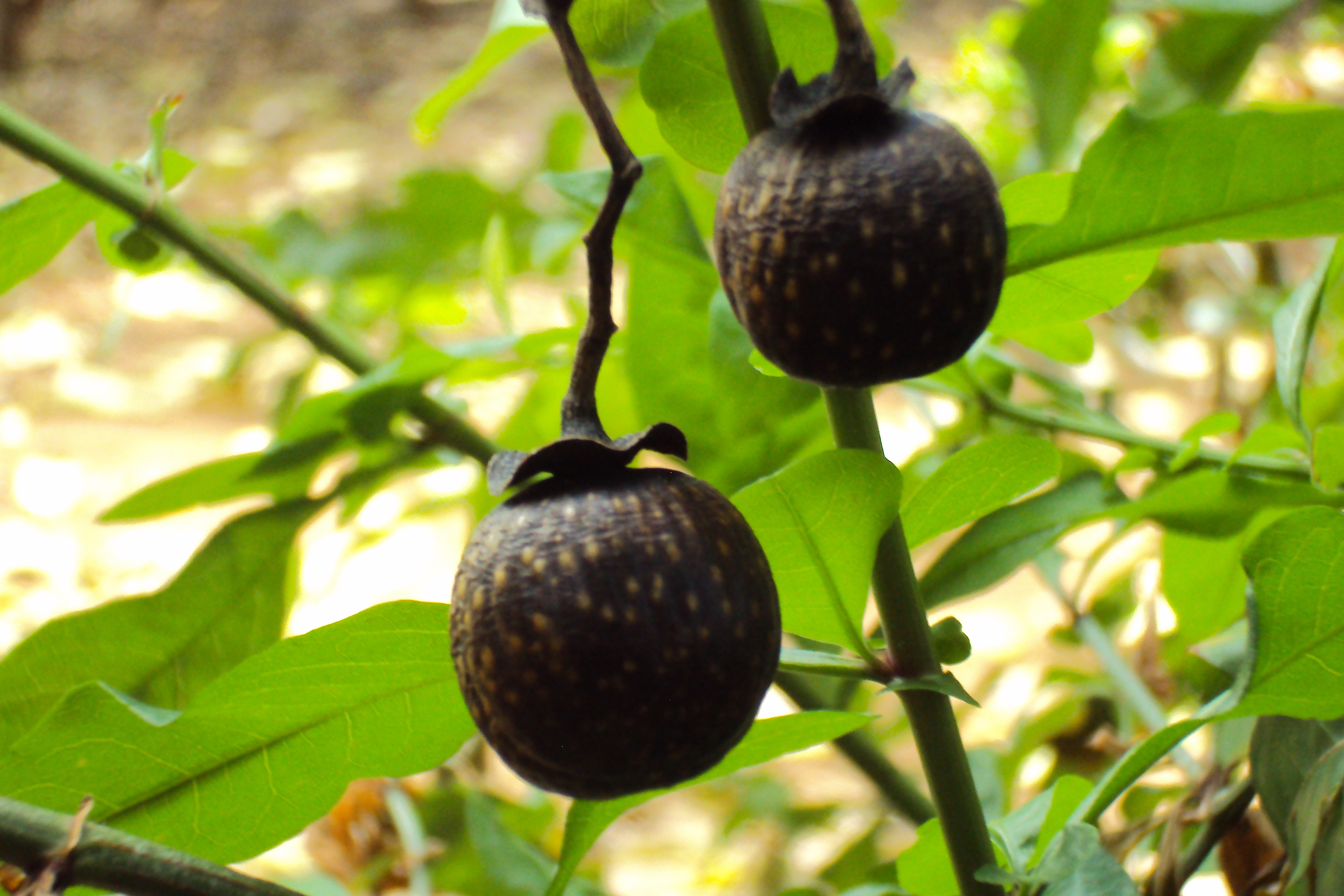

Scientific classification
- Kingdom: Plantae
- Clade: Tracheophytes
- Clade: Angiosperms
- Clade: Eudicots
- Clade: Asterids
- Order: Lamiales
- Family: Lamiaceae
- Genus: Vitex
- Species: V. doniana

Binomial name
- Vitex doniana Sweet

= Vitex doniana =

African fruit, black plum

Vitex doniana is a tree native to the Afrotropics. Its fruits are one of several fruits called black plums. This tree is often grown for its fruits.

== Description ==
It grows to 4–8 metres (13–26 ft), and rarely up to 15 metres (49 ft). Its fruits are at most 2.5 centimetres (31/32 in) in length. V. doniana is found at altitudes of 0–1,800 metres (0–5,906 ft) in Ethiopia, Nigeria, Eswatini, Tanzania, Uganda and Zambia. The insect Rastrococcus invadens is a pest to this plant.

V. doniana is known as plem in Ethiopia, uchakoro in Nigeria, mfudu and mfuu in Eswatini, mfuu in Tanzania, munyamazi and yuelo in Uganda and kashilumbalu in Zambia.

V. doniana is one of the few plants notable for its phytoecdysteroid content, Ochieng et al. 2013 finding it is one of the few with more than 0.001% by dry weight. Specifically they find 21-hydroxyshidasterone, 11b-hydroxy-20-deoxyshidasterone and 2,3-acetonide-24-hydroxyecdysone.
