= Geji language =

Chadic language spoken in Nigeria

Geji
- Region: Bauchi State
- Native speakers: 8,000 (2019)
- Language family: Afro-Asiatic: Chadic; West; Barawa (B.3); Zaar; Geji
- Dialects: Mәgang
- Writing system: Latin

Language codes
- ISO 639-3: Either: gyz – Geji (Gyazi) zbu – Buu
- Glottolog: geji1246
- ELP: Geji
- Buu (Nigeria)

Geji (Gezawa) is a minor West Chadic dialect cluster of Bauchi State, Nigeria. The three varieties are Buu, Gyaazi and Mәgang (Mugan). The latter two are quite similar.

== Varieties ==
Blench (2020) lists:

- Buu
- Gyaazi, Mәgang

Zaranda, an exonym for Bu, endonym Bùù, is a Chadic language spoken in the South of Bauchi State, in Nigeria, belonging to the South-Bauchi West group of Chadic languages (Shimizu 1978). Although generally associated with Bolu, Pelu and Geji, Buu stands apart from these other lects with which there is no intercomprehension. Most of the Buu population has migrated from the original location of the Zaranda village (Zaranda Habe, longitude 9,57; latitude 10,28) to the present Zaranda (longitude 9,52; latitude 10,23) where they have abandoned their language for Hausa and Fulfulde. The few that have retained their language live in Zaranda Habe, in houses scattered in the hills, gathering around the chief once a year for the traditional religious festivities. It is believed to be clearly distinct and probably a separate language.

Gezawa, Gaejawa are exonyms for Geji, endonym Gyaazә. Bagba is a loconym.

Mәgang ('Mugan') is spoken by about 3,000-4,000 speakers in the following 8 villages of Bauchi LGA, Bauchi State (all located just to the south of Bauchi city).

Megang locations
Village name	IPA	Notes
Byeru	bʲèrúp	
Haɗobilang	háɗòbíla᷄ŋ	
Baking Kura	bàkíŋ kúrá	Hausa name
Pakimi	pákìmī	
Beddare	béddárè	
Balla	bāllā	
Bәm Mәgang	bә̄m mә̀ga᷄ŋ	
Makyera	màkʲérá	Hausa name

Belu and Pelu are variant spellings of Byeru, also spelled Pyaalu (Pyààlù), Pyalu, or Fyalu.

== Numerals ==
The Mәgang numerals are:

Numeral	Mәgang
one	ɗéɗә᷄m
two	ɗélóp
three	ɗèmèkáŋ
four	ɗu᷄psí
five	ɗènàntә́ŋ
six	ɗә́màkā
seven	ɗèníŋgī
eight	ɗíwsә́psı᷄
nine	nētʷópsī
ten	ɗēkúɬ
