= Zari language =

Extinct Chadic dialect cluster of Nigeria

Zari
- Region: Bauchi State, Plateau State
- Ethnicity: 20,700 (2000)
- Extinct: 2000
- Language family: Afro-Asiatic: Chadic; West; Barawa (B.3); Zaar; Zari
- Dialects: Zakshi (Zaksa); Boto (Boot, Bibot); Zari (Kopti, Kwapm)

Language codes
- ISO 639-3: zaz
- Glottolog: zari1242
- ELP: Zari

Zari (Zariwa) is a Chadic dialect cluster of Nigeria. Blench (2019) lists varieties as Zari, Zakshi, and Boto.

Although there is an ethnic population of about 20,000, the last speaker had already died by 2000 (Campbell and Belew 2018).
