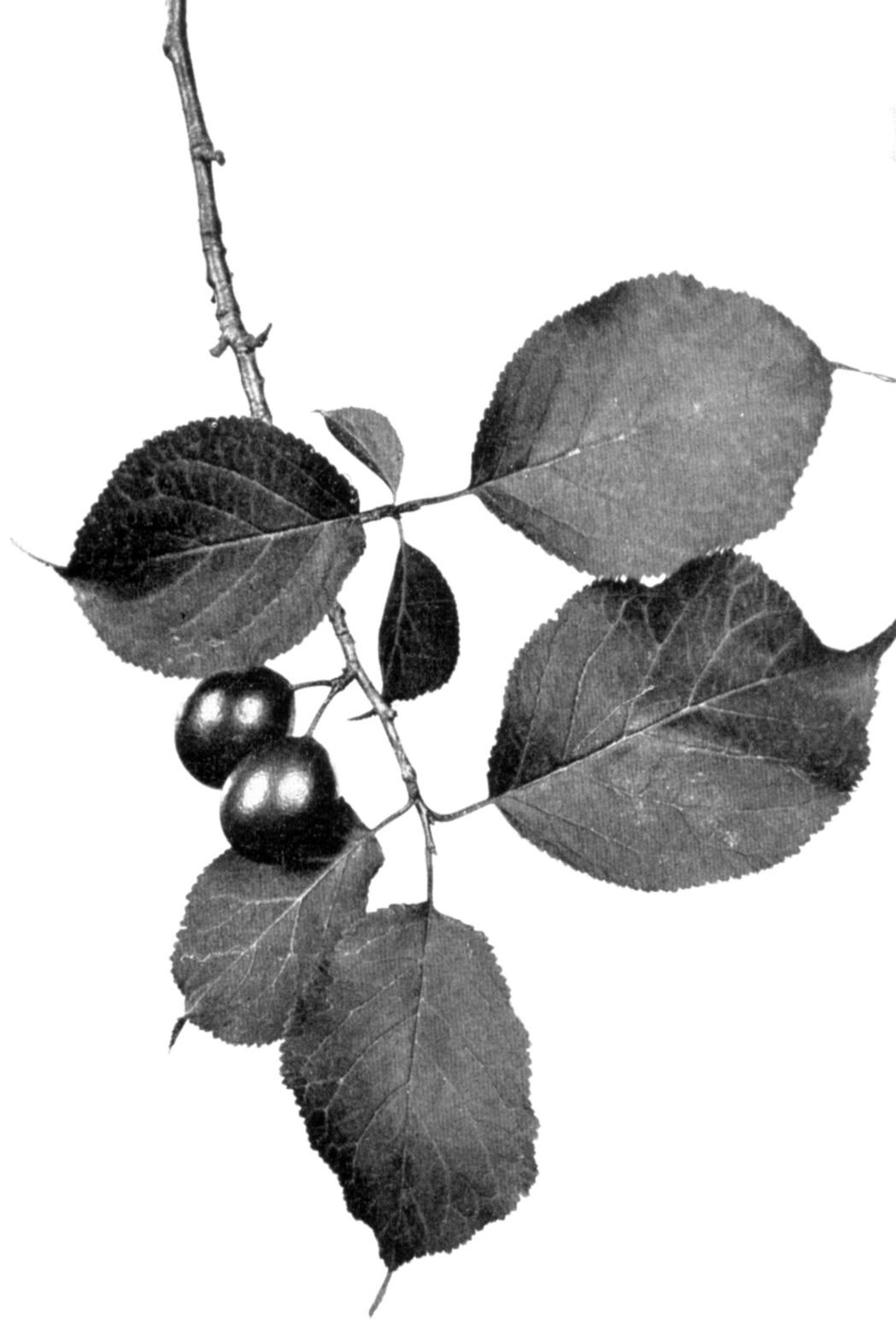
- Fruits and leaves

Conservation status
- Least Concern (IUCN 3.1)

Scientific classification
- Kingdom: Plantae
- Clade: Tracheophytes
- Clade: Angiosperms
- Clade: Eudicots
- Clade: Rosids
- Order: Rosales
- Family: Rosaceae
- Genus: Prunus
- Subgenus: Prunus subg. Prunus
- Section: Prunus sect. Prunocerasus
- Species: P. nigra

Binomial name
- Prunus nigra Aiton
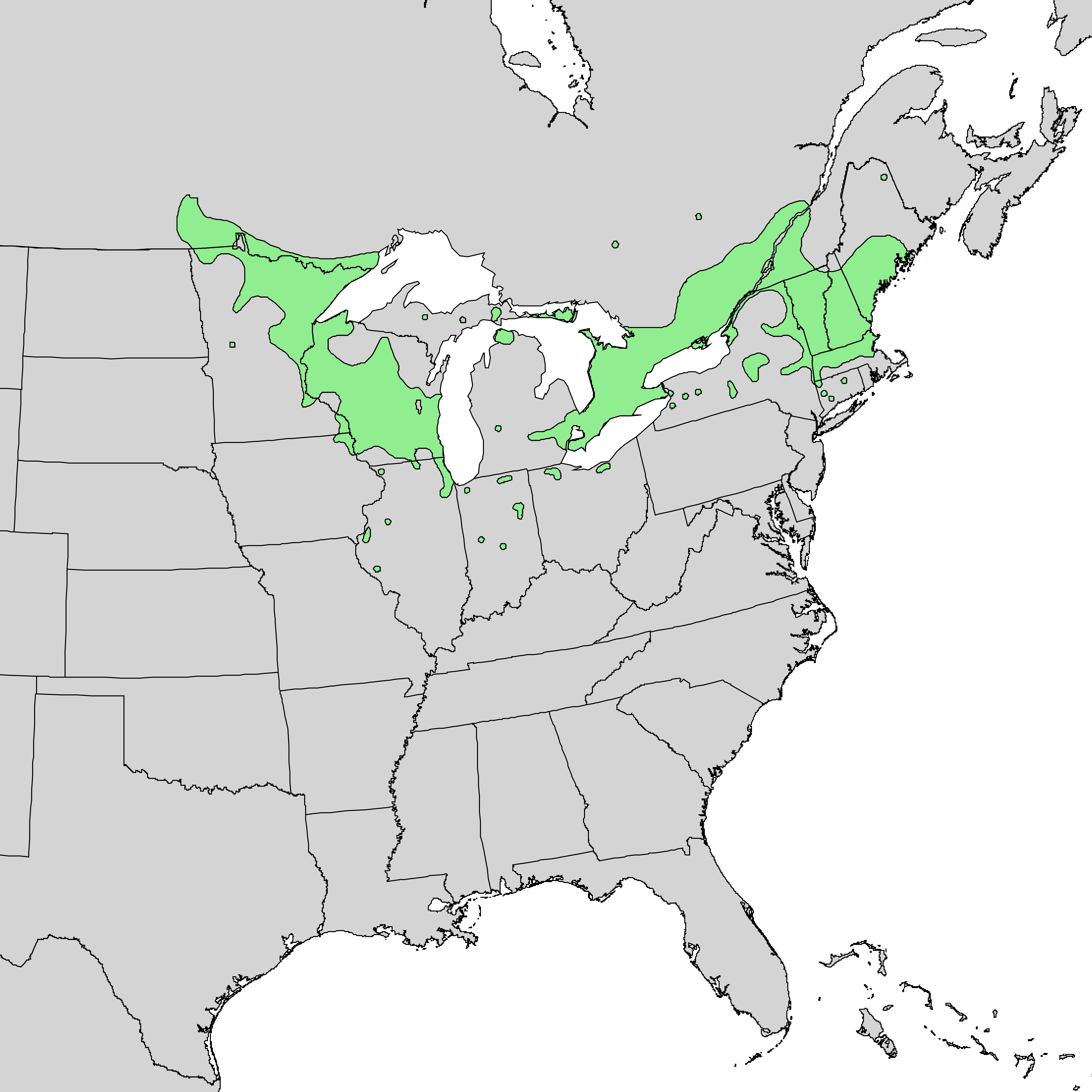
- Natural range of Prunus nigra

Synonyms
- Cerasus nigra Loisel.; Prunus americana var. nigra (Aiton) Waugh

= Prunus nigra =

Species of tree

Prunus nigra, the Canada plum, Canadian plum, or black plum, is a species of Prunus native to eastern North America.

== Description ==
Prunus nigra is a deciduous shrub or small tree growing to 10 metres (33 feet) tall with a trunk up to 25 centimetres (10 inches) in diameter, with a low-branched, dense crown of stiff, rigid, branches. The bark is gray-brown, older layers coming off in thick plates. The branchlets are bright green at first, later become dark brown tinged with red, and spiny. The winter buds are chestnut brown, long-pointed at the tip, up to 8 millimetres (3/8 in) long.

The leaves are alternate, simple, and oblong-ovate or obovate, 5–12 cm (2–4 3/4 in) long and 3–7 cm (1 1/8–2 3/4 in) broad, wedge-shaped, slightly heart-shaped, or rounded at base, doubly crenaulate-serrate, abruptly contracted to a narrow point at the apex, feather-veined, midrib conspicuous; they emerge from the bud convolute, downy, slightly tinged with red, are smooth, becoming bright green above and paler beneath when full grown. The leaf petioles are stout, bearing two large dark glands and early deciduous, lanceolate, and three to five-lobed stipules.

The flowers are 15–25 mm (5/8–1 in) diameter, with five rounded petals, white fading to pale pink, with a more or less irregularly notched margin; they are slightly fragrant, borne in three to four-flowered umbels, with short, thick peduncles, and appear before the leaves in mid to late spring. The flower stalks are slender and dark red. The calyx is conic, dark red, five-lobed, the lobes acute, finally reflexed, glandular, smooth on the inner surface, imbricate in bud, ovate, with short claws, imbricate in bud. There are 15–20 stamens, inserted on the calyx tube; the filaments are thread-like, the anthers purplish, introrse, and two-celled; the cells open longitudinally. The pistil has a superior ovary in the bottom of the calyx tube, being one-celled, with two ovules.

The fruit is an oblong-oval drupe, 25–30 mm (1–1 1/8 in) long with a tough, thick, orange red skin, free from bloom, yellow flesh adherent to the stone; the stone oval, compressed. It matures in late summer or early autumn. The cotyledons are thick and fleshy.

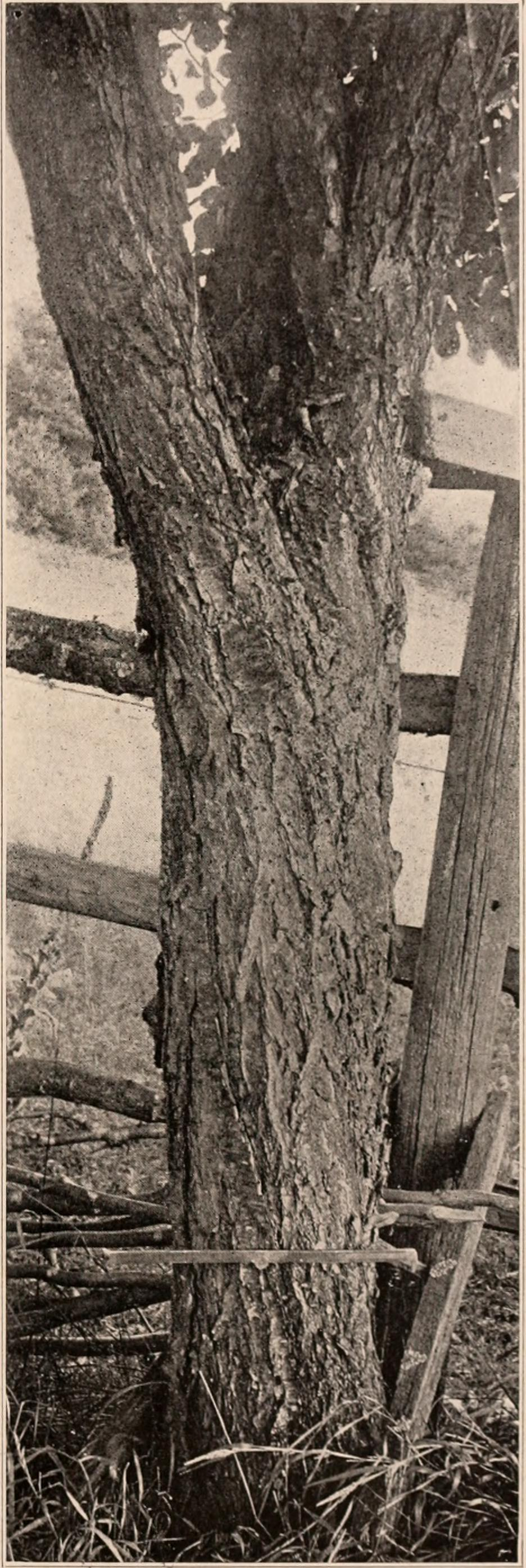
Trunk

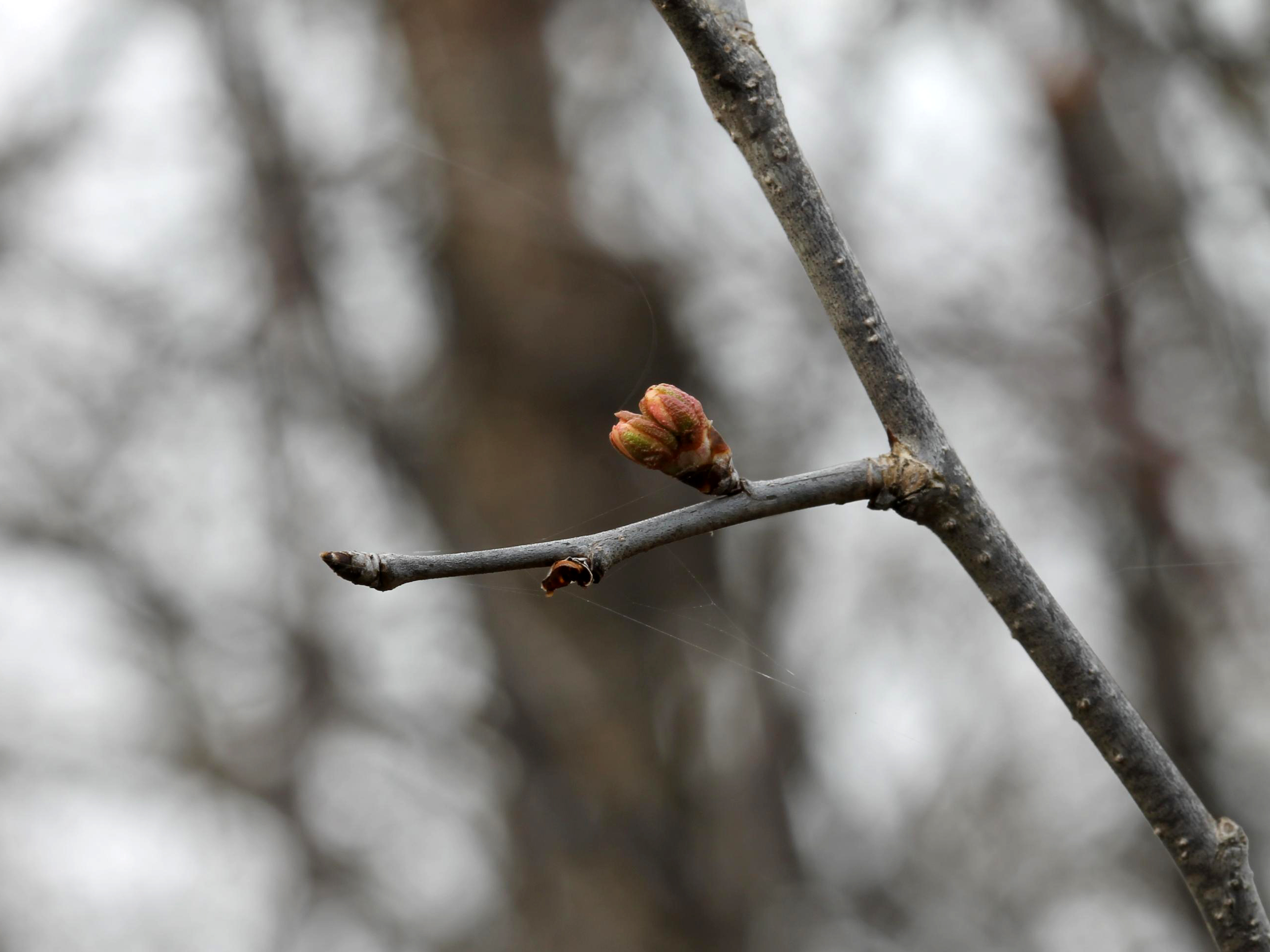
Buds on branch

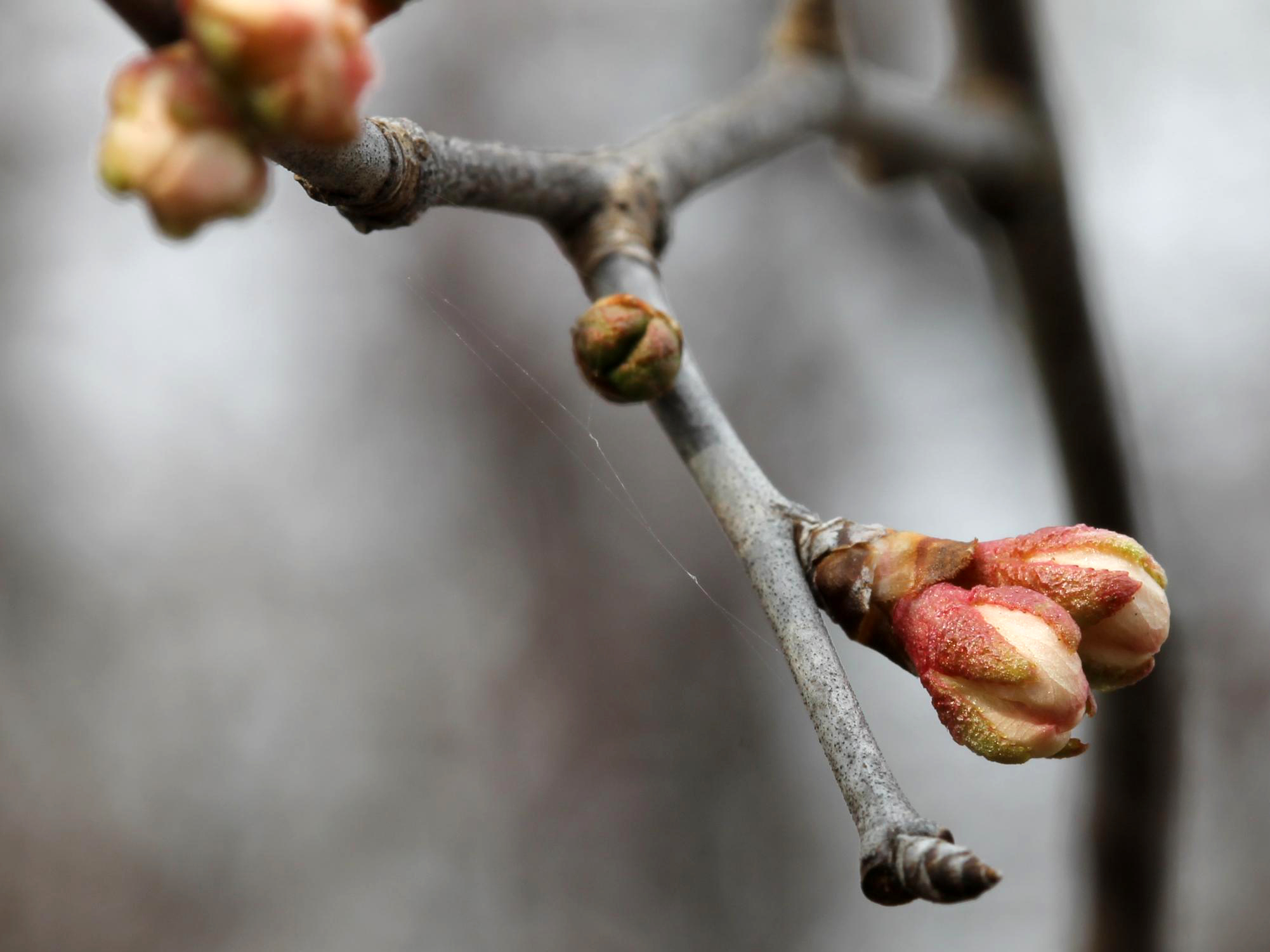
Close-up of buds

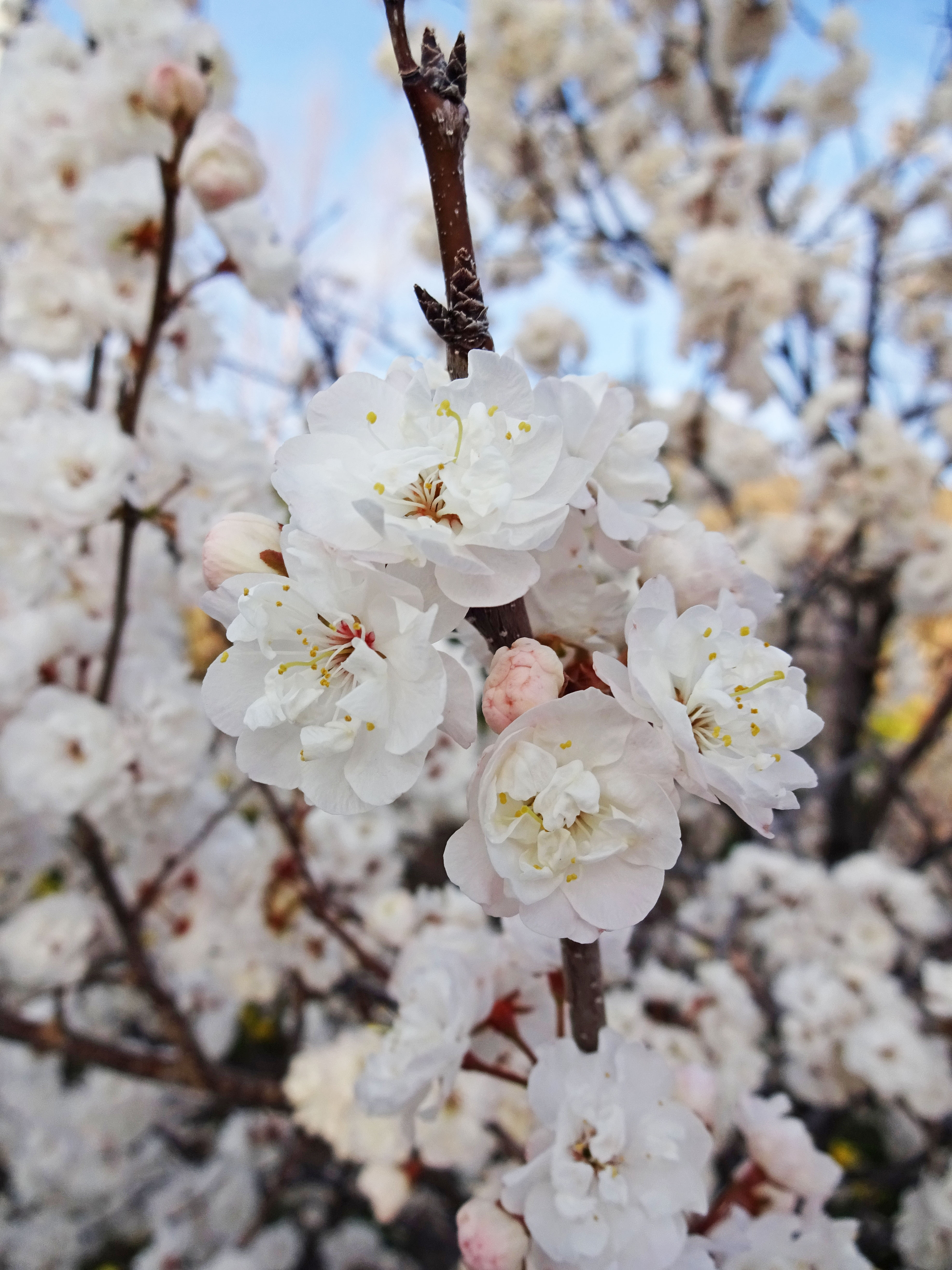
Blooms

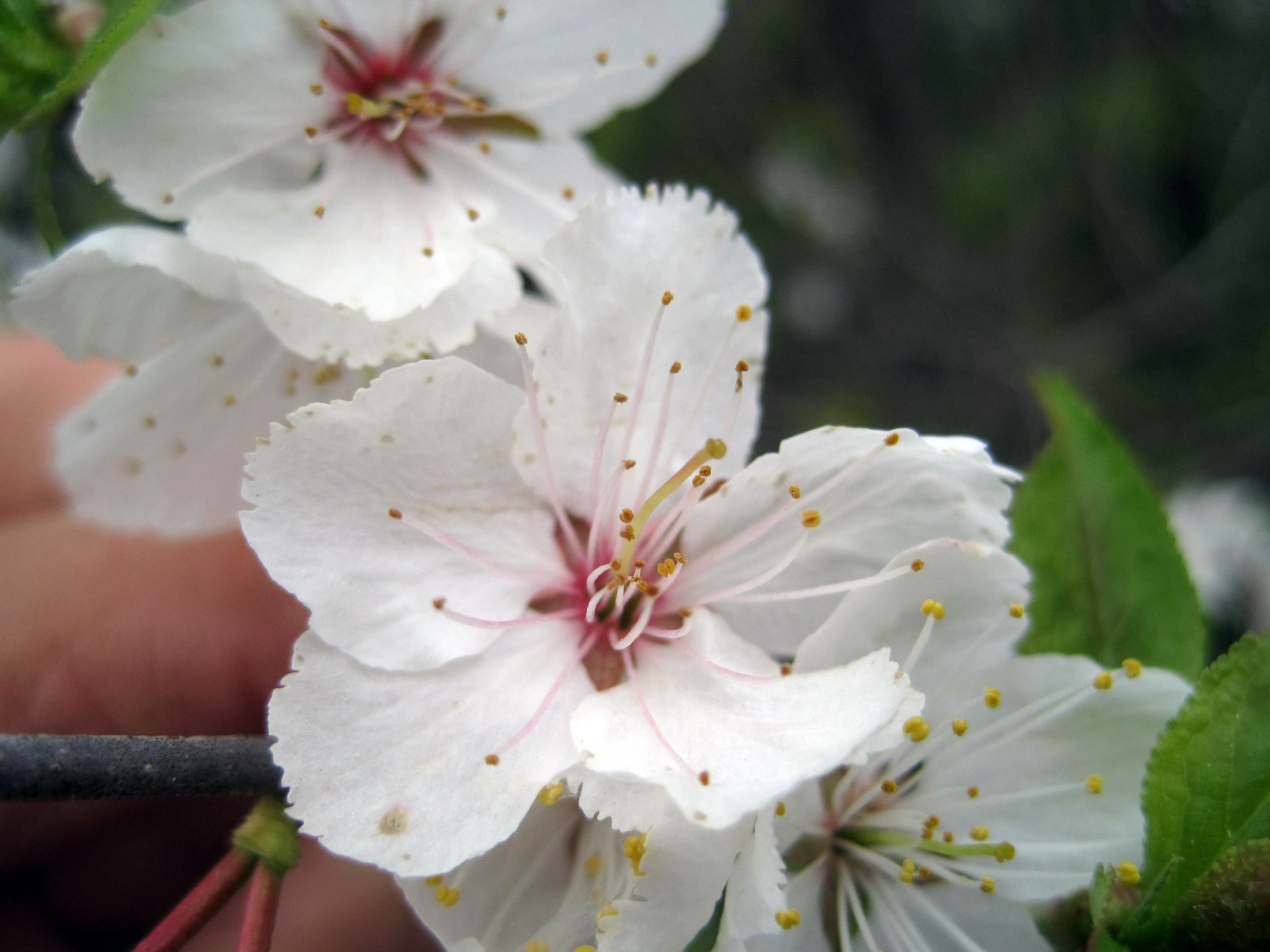
Flowers close-up

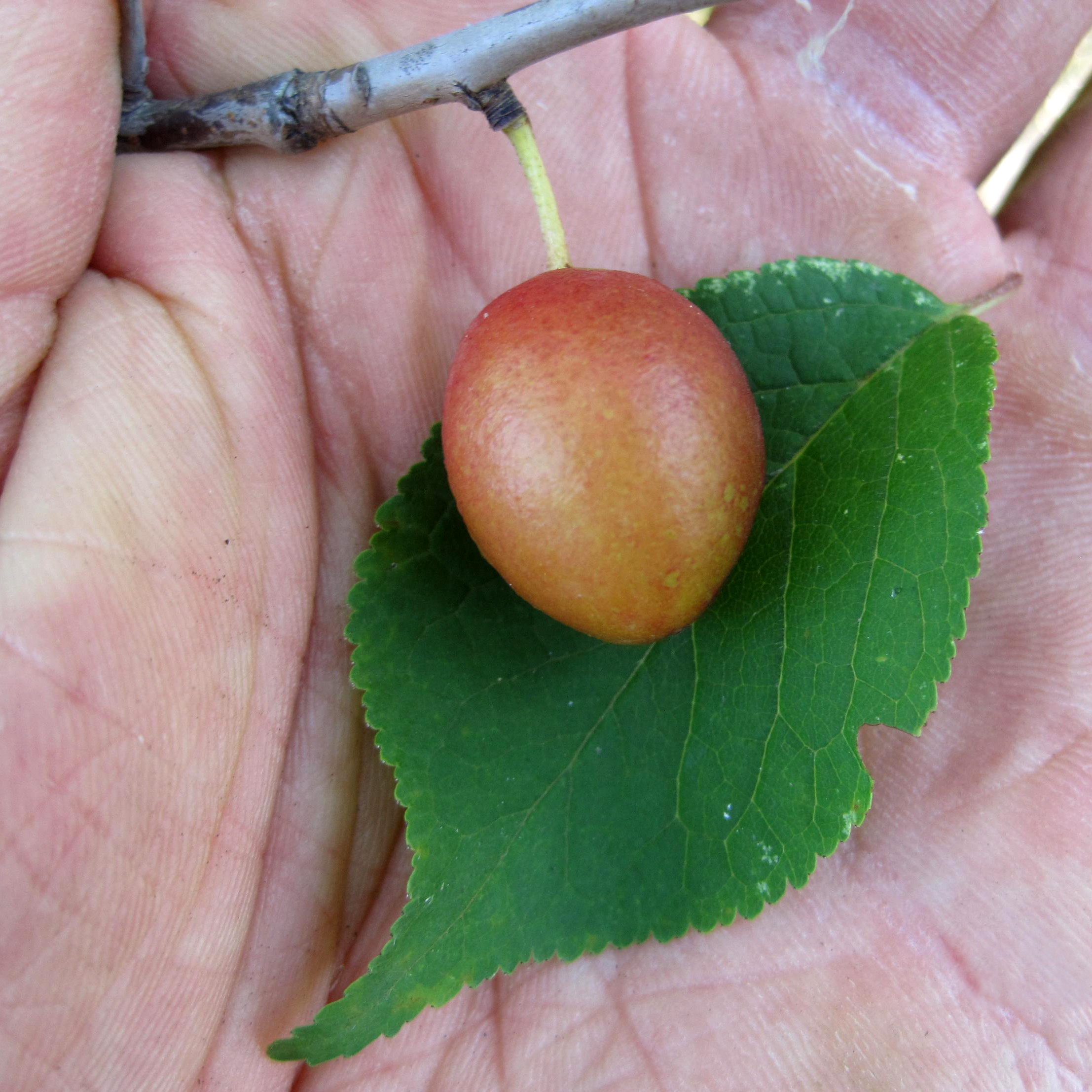
Plum and leaf

=== Similar species ===
The species can easily be confused with the related Prunus americana, differing most obviously in the leaf margins having blunt, gland-tipped teeth, rather than the sharp, glandless teeth of P. americana leaves.

== Distribution and habitat ==
It can be found from Nova Scotia west to Minnesota and southeastern Manitoba, and south as far as Connecticut, Illinois, and Iowa. It is endangered in Ohio. Isolated populations are present along streambanks in Saskatchewan and Alberta, along Lake Timiskaming in Northern Ontario, and along the Maine-New Brunswick border.

The species grows best in alluvial soils or over limestone.

== Ecology ==
The population along the Maine-New Brunswick border is severely threatened as the tree is a host for an aphid that menaces the local potato crop, with many of the trees having been cut down to reduce this problem.

A fungus in the genus Taphrina often attacks the plums; the young ovaries swell, often much larger than full grown plums, become hollow and often persist on the tree in winter. Known as "plum pockets", they appear pale green, leathery to the touch, and hollow with the exception of a few fibrous bands. The disease reduces regeneration of the plums.

== Uses ==
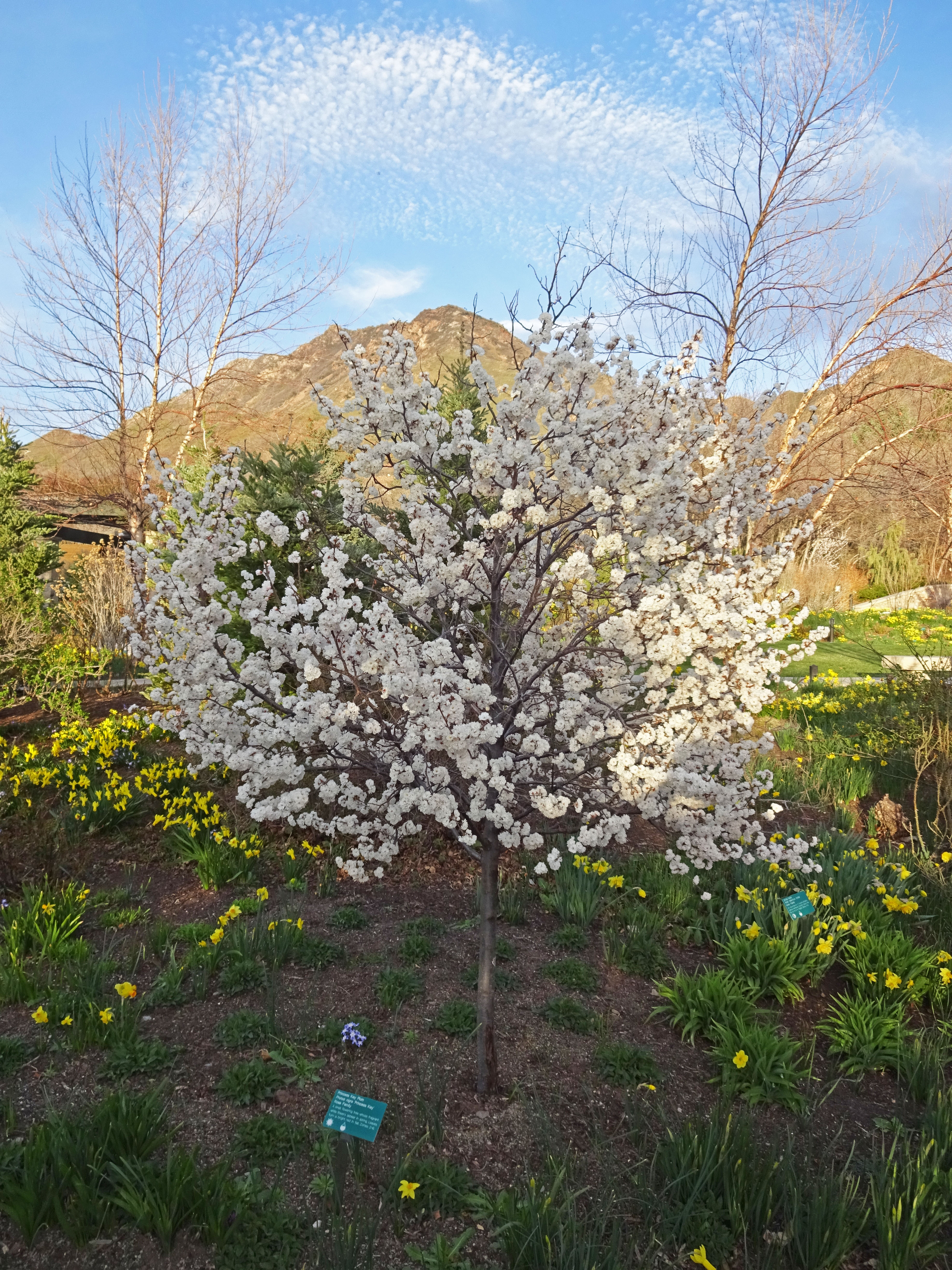
Cultivated specimen in bloom in Utah

The fruit is somewhat sour, clingstone, and very juicy. It can be eaten raw when fully ripe or cooked and made into pies, preserves, and jellies. Dried, these plums were a popular winter staple of indigenous peoples. French explorer Jacques Cartier remarked in his journal that he was presented with dried Canada plums by the St. Lawrence Iroquoians in his first expedition to Canada.

One of the few tree fruits indigenous to the Upper Midwest of the U.S., Northern Ontario and the prairie provinces of Canada and capable of surviving the harsh winters there, efforts were made to breed improved cultivars of these plums in the 19th century. Notable varieties still grown today include "Assiniboine" and "Cheney". P. nigra has the same number of chromosomes as P. salicina, the cultivated Japanese plum, and so the two cross-pollinate readily. Breeding work in the 20th century resulted in improved P. nigra x salicina hybrid varieties that retain the high quality of Japanese plums and the hardiness of wild Canada plums, such as "Pembina", "Superior", and "Patterson Pride".

The wood is bright red brown; heavy, hard, strong, and close-grained, with a density of 0.6918. When wounded the wood turns an attractive red colour, and sawlogs of intentionally wounded trees are sought after by woodturners.

== In culture ==
The autobiographical novel On the Banks of Plum Creek, the fourth book in Laura Ingalls Wilder's Little House on the Prairie series, popularized the use of these wild plums for dried fruit by early settlers in the western U.S. and Canada.
