= Jimi language (Nigeria) =

Afro-Asiatic language of Nigeria

Jimi
- Native to: Nigeria
- Region: Bauchi State
- Native speakers: (1,000 cited 1995)
- Language family: Afro-Asiatic: Chadic; West Chadic; Barawa (B.3); Boghom; Jimi
- Dialects: Zumo

Language codes
- ISO 639-3: jmi
- Glottolog: jimi1255
- ELP: Jimi (Nigeria)

Jimi (also known as Bi-Gimu) is an Afro-Asiatic language spoken in Jimi village in Bauchi State, Nigeria. Blench (2006) considers the Zumo (Jum) variety to be a separate language.
