= Silk-cotton tree =

Silk-cotton tree is a common name for several plants and may refer to:

- Bombax ceiba, native to the Asian tropics
- Ceiba pentandra, native to the American tropics and west Africa
- Cochlospermum religiosum, native to the Asian tropics
