= Yatee Zapotec =

Zapotec language of Oaxaca, Mexico

- Lachirioag Zapotec
- Native to: Mexico
- Region: northern Oaxaca
- Native speakers: 5,000 (2004)
- Language family: Oto-Manguean: Zapotecan; Zapotec; Sierra Norte; Rincon; Yatee Zapotec
- Dialects: Yatee Zapotec; Lachirioag Zapotec

Language codes
- ISO 639-3: zty
- Glottolog: yate1242

Yatee Zapotec and Lachirioag Zapotec (San Cristóbal Lachiruaj) are dialects of a Zapotec language of Oaxaca, Mexico.

The Mexican government organization INALI recognizes both Yalálag Zapotec and Yatee Zapotec as a variety of Zapotec called Zapoteco serrano, del sureste.
