= Polci language =

Afro-Asiatic language of Nigeria

Polci
- Barawa
- Region: Bauchi State, Nigeria
- Native speakers: (22,000 cited 1995)
- Language family: Afro-Asiatic: Chadic; West; Barawa (B.3); Zaar; Polci Cluster; Polci
- Dialects: Zul (Mbarmi, Barma); Baram (Mbaram, Barang); Dir (Diir, Dra, Baram Dutse); Buli; Langas (Nyamzak, Lundur); Polci (Posa, Polshi, Palci); Luri

Language codes
- ISO 639-3: Variously: ldd – Luri nzr – Dir-Nyamzak-Mbarimi pze – Pesse uly – Buli zlu – Zul
- Glottolog: nyam1284 buli1260 lund1276 polc1243 zull1239
- ELP: Polci
- Luri

Zule
- Person: Nya Zule
- People: Man Zule
- Language: Bi Zule

Polci (Pəlci, Posə) is an Afro-Asiatic language of Bauchi State, Nigeria. It is part of the Barawa cluster, which is in turn part of the West Chadic language family.

== Dialects ==
The Polci language is one of six dialect clusters of the Zaar subgroup of the Barawa branch of the Chadic languages. The Polci dialects are Zul, Baram (Mbaram), Dir, Buli, Nyamzak/Langas, and Polci proper.

An extinct dialect called Luri was possibly a dialect of Polci as well, but it is not well attested.

== History of scholarship ==
There have been several attempts to clarify the linguistic situation in the southern and southwestern part of Bauchi State, Nigeria, of which the Polci cluster and Polci language are a part.

In 1971, John Ballard, working with the Department of Linguistics and Nigerian Languages, University of Ibadan, did an extensive linguistic survey of the Nigerian Middle Belt published Historical inferences from the linguistic geography of the Nigerian Middle Belt. As a result, it came to light that there was a narrow corridor occupied by the speakers of Chadic languages in the southwest of Bauchi.

In the same year, Neil Campbell and James Hoskison from the Summer Institute of Linguistics carried out a linguistic survey of the Bauchi area. The survey, Bauchi Area Survey Report and published in 1972, listed the names, location and population of twenty four Chadic languages, which are very closely related to each other and are spoken to the south and west of Bauchi. They also collected word lists. However, no detailed analysis of linguistic data or language classification was included in either of these surveys.

Also in 1971, C. Hoffman published Provisional Check List of Chadic Languages, which contained 17 languages divided into two sub-groups. This list was revised and amplified by Kay Williamson in a document handed out to students at the University of Ibadan, titled Chadic languages of Nigeria in 1972, to include 21 languages classified into three subgroups.

With this information, K. Shimizu set out in 1974 to list the languages belonging to the Southern Bauchi Group, to examine their geographical distribution, and to use valid linguistic data to come up with sub-classifications. The survey, published in 1978 and titled A survey report of The South Bauchi Group of Chadic Languages came to the conclusion that not all languages listed under the dialect continuum of the South Bauchi Group belonged there and came up with a much more extensive, new classification. This is also the work from which the Barawa subgroup name came from, which was found to be the term used locally in this area to denote the speakers of this dialect continuum. Much of the research done on Barawa languages, the Polci cluster, and Polci itself use this survey as an important reference.

In 1999, Ronald Cosper published Barawa lexicon: A wordlist of eight South Bauchi (West Chadic) languages: Boghom, Buli, Dott, Geji, Jimi, Polci, Sayanci and Zul. It considered most of the languages to be endangered and found that most individuals who spoke any of these languages were also bilingual in Hausa, which may have had influence on their lexicons and grammars. The book contains a lexicon of 852 words from the different Barawa languages. The words are organized based on semantic and syntactic categories. Semantic noun categories are followed by adjectives, numerals, pronouns, prepositions, conjunctions and a number of categories of verbs. However, Cosper's work was seriously defective.

Since then, the majority of the research on South Bauchi West (B.3) languages has been conducted by Bernard Caron, a faculty member at the French National Centre for Scientific Research, LLACAN. Caron's research has focused on South Bauchi West and Polci cluster languages in particular. Many of his papers are available online and include topics such as linguistic classification, syntactic structures such as conditionals, and noun classes such as pronominal and number systems.

== Phonology ==
=== Consonants ===
Polci contains 35 consonant phonemes.

/ɓ/ and /ɗ/ are implosive consonants, which are common in the languages of Sub-Saharan Africa.

Table 1: Polci Consonants
		Labial		Alveolar		Palatal		Velar	
Nasal			m		n				ŋ
Plosive	prenasal		ᵐb		ⁿd				ᵑɡ
Plosive	plain	p	b	t	d			k	ɡ
Plosive	implosive		ɓ		ɗ				
Affricate				t͡s	d͡z	t͡ʃ	d͡ʒ		
Fricative	prenasal		(ᶬv)		ⁿz		ⁿʒ		
Fricative	plain	f	v	s	z	ʃ	ʒ	(x)	ɣ
Fricative	lateral			ɬ	ɮ				
Approximant			w		l		j		
Rhotic					r				

=== Vowels ===
Polci contains six vowels qualities, which can be pronounced as short or long.

Short vowels: /a/, /e/, /i/, /o/, /ə/, and /u/

Long vowels: /aː/, /eː/, /iː/, /oː/, /əː/, and /uː/

Table 2: Polci Vowels
	short			long		
	front	central	back	front	central	back
close	i		u	iː		uː
mid	e	ə	o	eː	əː	oː
open		a			aː	

=== Tones ===
Polci is a three-tone language: Low = à; Mid = a; High = á.

== Nouns ==
=== Plurality ===
Polci, being a South Bauchi West language, does not possess grammatical gender or nominal classes and as a rule, few nouns form a plural (morpho-lexical plural). The plural inside the NP (noun phrase) is expressed through the noun modifiers. There is no agreement between the verb and its arguments. However, plurality appears in the verb phrase in two places: (i) the formation of the imperatives (ii) a verbal derivation forming what has come to be called pluractionals.

=== Pronouns ===
Table 3: Polci Independent Pronouns
	singular	plural
1st person	ám	mì
2nd person	kí	kì
3rd person	tí	wún

=== Numbers ===
Polci has a decimal numeral system.

Table 4: Polci Number System
base numeral		+10		+20		× 10	
1	nɨ̀m	11	zup ɬiyè nɨ̀m	21	zì rop ɬiyè ni nɨ̀m	10	zup
2	rǒp	12	zup ɬiyè ròp	22	—N/a	20	zì rop
3	miyèn	13	zup ɬiyè miyèn	23	—N/a	30	zì miyèn
4	wupsɨ̀	14	zup ɬiyè wupsɨ̀	24	zì rop ɬiyè ni wupsɨ̀	40	zì wupsɨ̀
5	nə̀mtəm	15	zup ɬiyè nə̀mtəm	25	zì rop ɬiyè ni nə̀mtəm	50	zì nə̀mtəm
6	maɣà	16	zup ɬiyè maɣà	26	—N/a	60	zì maɣà
7	wusɨ̀rmìyen	17	zup ɬiyè wusɨ̀rmìyen	27	—N/a	70	zì wusɨ̀rmìyen
8	wɨsɨpsɨ̀	18	zup ɬiyè wɨsɨpsɨ̀	28	—N/a	80	zì wɨsɨpsɨ̀
9	nàtoropsɨ̀	19	zup ɬiyè nə̀topsi	29	—N/a	90	zì nàtoropsɨ̀
10	zup	20	zì rop		—N/a	100	zì zup

== Syntax ==
=== Conditionals ===
Conditionals generally are assumed to share their structure with topics. However, in Chadic South Bauchi West languages, such as Polci, conditionals share their structure with focus, not topic. In Polci specifically, focused constituents and conditional clauses appear on the left periphery marked by the identifying copula /kɶn/ 'it is'. ].
