= Guruntum language =

Chadic language spoken in Nigeria

Guruntum
- Guruntum-Mbaaru
- gùrdùŋ
- Region: Nigeria
- Native speakers: (15,000 cited 1993)
- Language family: Afro-Asiatic: Chadic; West; Barawa (B.3); Guruntum languages; Guruntum

Language codes
- ISO 639-3: grd
- Glottolog: guru1271
- ELP: Guruntum

Guruntum is a Chadic language spoken in Bauchi and Alkaleri LGAs, Bauchi State, Nigeria. In 1993 it was spoken by about 15,000 people.

== Classification ==
Guruntum is a West Chadic language of the Barawa (B.3) group.

Major dialects include Kuuku, Gayar, Mbaaru, Dooka, Gar and Karakara.

== Phonology ==
=== Vowels ===
Guruntum contrasts long and short forms for all vowels except for /ɨ/. In addition, two nasalized vowel phonemes exist: /ũː/ /ãː/.

	Front		Central		Back	
	short	long	short	long	short	long
Close	i	iː	ɨ		u	uː ũː
Mid	e	eː			o	oː
Open			a	aː ãː		

There are two diphthongs, /ai/ and /au/.

=== Consonants ===
		Labial			Alveolar	Postalveolar or palatal	Velar		
		Plain	Palatalized	Labialized	Alveolar	Postalveolar or palatal	Plain	Palatalized	Labialized
Nasal		m	mʲ	mʷ	n	nʲ	ŋ		
Stop	prenasalized	ᵐb			ⁿd	ᶮdʒ	ᵑɡ	ᵑɡʲ	ᵑɡʷ
Stop	voiceless	p	pʲ		t		k	kʲ	kʷ
Stop	voiced	b	bʲ		d	dʒ	ɡ	ɡʲ	ɡʷ
Stop	implosive	ɓ			ɗ				
Fricative	voiceless	f	fʲ	fʷ	s	ʃ			
Fricative	voiced	v		vʷ	z	ʒ			
Trill					r				
Approximant					l	j			w

/r/ is realized as a flap intervocalically before back vowels; elsewhere it is a trill.

=== Tone ===
Guruntum has four tones: high, low, rising (low-high) and falling (high-low).
