= Zangwal language =

Endangered Chadic language of Nigeria

Zangwal
- Native to: Nigeria
- Region: Bauchi State
- Native speakers: (100 cited 1993)
- Language family: Afro-Asiatic: Chadic; West Chadic; Barawa (B.3); Guruntum; Zangwal

Language codes
- ISO 639-3: zah
- Glottolog: zang1255
- ELP: Zangwal

Zangwal (also known as Twar or Zwangal) is an endangered language spoken in Bauchi State, Nigeria. There were approximately 100 remaining speakers in 1993.
