= Kir-Balar language =

Afro-Asiatic languages of Nigeria

Kir-Balar
- Native to: Nigeria
- Region: Bauchi State
- Native speakers: (3,100 cited 1993)
- Language family: Afro-Asiatic: Chadic; West Chadic; Barawa (B.3); Boghom; Kir-Balar

Language codes
- ISO 639-3: kkr
- Glottolog: kirb1236

Kir-Balar (also known as Kir, Kirr) is a pair of closely related Afro-Asiatic languages spoken in Kir Bengbet and Kir Bajang’le, villages, Bauchi LGA, Bauchi State, Nigeria.
