= Y-DNA haplogroups by ethnic group =

The various ethnolinguistic groups found in the Caucasus, Central Asia, Europe, the Middle East, North Africa and/or South Asia demonstrate differing rates of particular Y-DNA haplogroups.

In the table below, the first two columns identify ethnolinguistic groups. Subsequent columns represent the sample size (n) of the study or studies cited, and the percentage of each haplogroup found in that particular sample.

(Data from studies conducted before 2004 may be inaccurate or a broad estimate, due to obsolete haplogroup naming systems – e.g. the former Haplogroup 2 included members of the relatively unrelated haplogroups known later as Haplogroup G and macrohaplogroup IJ [which comprises haplogroups I and J].)

| Population | Language family | n | R1b | n | R1a | n | I | n | E1b1b | n | E1b1a | n | J | n | G | n | N | n | T | n | L | n | H |
|---|---|---|---|---|---|---|---|---|---|---|---|---|---|---|---|---|---|---|---|---|---|---|---|
| Albanians | IE (Albanian) | | | | | 106 | 23.6; 25/106 | 44 | 25; 11/44 | | | 56 | 23.30; 13/56 | | | | | | | | | | |
| Albanians | IE (Albanian) | 51 | 23.6 | 51 | 9.8; 5/51 | 51 | 9.6 | 51 | 26.6 | | | 51 | 23.53; 12/51 | 51 | 1.96; 1/51 | 51 | 0.0 | 51 | 0.0 | 51 | 0.0 | | |
| Kosovo Albanians (Pristina) | IE (Albanian) | 114 | 21.10; 24/114 | 114 | 4.42; 5/114 | 114 | 7.96; 9/114 | 114 | 47.40; 54/114 | | | 114 | 16.70; 19/114 | | | | | | | | | | |
| Albanians (Tirana) | IE (Albanian) | 30 | 18.3 | 30 | 8.3 | 30 | 11.7 | 30 | 28.3 | 30 | 0.0 | 30 | 20.0; 6/30 | 30 | 3.3; 1/30 | | | | | | | | |
| Albanians | IE (Albanian) | 55 | 18.2; 10/55 | 55 | 9.1; 5/55 | 55 | 21.7; 12/55 | 55 | 25.4; 14/55 | 55 | 0.0 | 55 | 23.5; 13/55 | 55 | 1.8; 1/55 | 55 | 0.0 | 55 | 0.0 | 55 | 0.0 | | |
| Albanians (North Macedonia) | IE (Albanian) | 64 | 18.8; 12/64 | 64 | 1.6; 1/64 | 64 | 17.3; 11/64 | 64 | 39.1; 25/64 | 64 | 0.0 | 64 | 22; 14/64 | 64 | 1.6; 1/64 | 64 | 0.0 | 64 | 0.0 | 64 | 0.0 | | |
| Albanians + Albanians (North Macedonia) | IE (Albanian) | 55+ 64; 119 | 18.5; 22/119 | 55+ 64; 119 | 5.05; 6/119 | 55+ 64; 119 | 19.33; 23/119 | 55+ 64; 119 | 32.8; 39/119 | | 0.0 | 55+ 64; 119 | 22.7; 27/119 | 55+ 64; 119 | 1.7; 2/119 | | 0.0 | | 0.0 | | 0.0 | | |
| Abazinians | Northwest Caucasian | 14 | 0 | 14 | 14 | 14 | 0 | 14 | 0 | 14 | 0 | 14 | 7 | 14 | 29 | | | | | | | | |
| Abkhaz | Northwest Caucasian | 12 | 8 | 12 | 33.0 | 12 | 33.3 | 12 | 0 | 12 | 0 | 12 | 25 | 12 | 0 | | | | | | | | |
| Altaians | Turkic, Siberia | | | | | | | | | | | | | | | 142 | 9.2 | | | | | | |
| Altaians (Northern) | Turkic, Siberian | 50 | 6.0 | 50 | 38.0 | 50 | 0.0 | 50 | 0.0 | | | 50 | 2.0 | 50 | 0.0 | 50 | 10.0 | | | | | | |
| Altaians (Southern) | Turkic, Siberia | 96 | 1.0 | 96 | 53.1 | 96 | 2.1 | 96 | 1.0 | | | 96 | 4.2 | | | 96 | 11.5 | | | | | | |
| Ambalakarar | Dravidian (Southern) | 29 | 0.0 | 29 | 13.8 | 29 | 0.0 | 29 | 0.0 | 29 | 0.0 | 29 | 6.9 | 29 | 3.4 | 29 | 0.0 | 29 | 0.0 | 29 | 20.7 | | |
| Amhara | Afro-Asiatic (Semitic) | 48 | 0.0 | 48 | 0.0 | 48 | 0.0 | 48 | 45.8 | | | 48 | 33.3 | 48 | 0.0 | 48 | 0.0 | 48 | 4.2 | 48 | 0.0 | | |
| Andalusians | IE (Romance) | 29 | 65.5 | 29 | 0.0 | 103 | 3.9 | 76 | 9.2 | | | 93 | 1.1 | 29 | 0.0 | 29 | 0.0 | 29 | 6.9 | 29 | 3.4 | | |
| Andis | Northeast Caucasian | 49 | 6.1 | 49 | 2.0 | 49 | 26.5 | 49 | 2.0 | | | 49 | 55.1 | 49 | 6.1 | 49 | 0.0 | 49 | 2.0 | 49 | 0.0 | | |
| Arabs (Algeria) | Afro-Asiatic (Semitic) | 35 | 13.0 | 35 | 0.0 | | | 32 | 50 | | | 35 | 35 | | | | | | | | | | |
| Arabs (Algeria - Oran) | Afro-Asiatic (Semitic) | 102 | 10.8 | 102 | 1 | | | 102 | 50.9 | 102 | 12.8 | 102 | 27.4 | | | | | | | | | | |
| Arabs (Bedouin) | Afro-Asiatic (Semitic) | 32 | 0.0 | 32 | 9.4 | 32 | 6.3 | 32 | 18.7 | | | 32 | 65.6 | | | | | | | 32 | 0.0 | | |
| Arabs (Bedouins, Sinai Peninsula) | Afro-Asiatic (Semitic) | 147 | 4.1 | 147 | 2.7 | 147 | 0.7 | 147 | 36.7 | 147 | 2.8 | 147 | 32.0 | 147 | 8.8 | 147 | 0.0 | 147 | 8.2 | | | | |
| Arabs (Palestine) | Afro-Asiatic (Semitic) | 143 | 8.4 | 143 | 1.4 | 143 | 6.3 | 143 | 20.3 | | | 143 | 55.2 | | | | | | | 143 | 0.0 | | |
| Arabs (Morocco) | Afro-Asiatic (Semitic) | 44 | 3.8 | 44 | 0.0 | 44 | 0.0 | 49 | 85.5 | | | 49 | 2.4 | | | | | | | | | | |
| Arabs (Oman) | Afro-Asiatic (Semitic) | 121 | 1.7 | 121 | 9.1 | 121 | 0.0 | 121 | 15.7 | 121 | 7.4 | 121 | 47.9 | 121 | 1.7 | | | 121 | 8.3 | 121 | 0.8 | | |
| Arabs (Qatar) | Afro-Asiatic (Semitic) | 72 | 1.4 | 72 | 6.9 | 72 | 0.0 | 72 | 5.6 | 72 | 2.8 | 72 | 66.7 | 72 | 2.8 | 72 | 0.0 | 72 | 0.0 | 72 | 2.8 | | |
| Arabs (Saudi Arabia) | Afro-Asiatic (Semitic) | 157 | 1.9 | 157 | 5.1 | 157 | 0.0 | 157 | 7.6 | 157 | 7.6 | 157 | 40.0 | 157 | 3.2 | 157 | 0.0 | 157 | 5.1 | 157 | 1.9 | | |
| Arabs (UAE) | Afro-Asiatic (Semitic) | 164 | 4.3 | 164 | 7.3 | | | 164 | 11.6 | 164 | 5.5 | 164 | 45.1 | 164 | 4.3 | 164 | 0.0 | 164 | 4.9 | 164 | 3.0 | | |
| Arabs (Yemen) | Afro-Asiatic (Semitic) | 62 | 0.0 | 62 | 0.0 | 62 | 0.0 | 62 | 12.9 | 62 | 3.2 | 62 | 82.3 | 62 | 1.6 | 62 | 0.0 | 62 | 0.0 | 62 | 0.0 | | |
| Arabs (Syria) | Afro-Asiatic (Semitic) | 20 | 15.0 | 20 | 10.0 | 20 | 5.0 | 20 | 10.0 | | | 20 | 30.0 | 20 | 0.0 | 20 | 0.0 | 20 | 0.0 | 20 | 0.0 | | |
| Arabs (Lebanon) | Afro-Asiatic (Semitic) | 31 | 6.4 | 31 | 9.7 | 31 | 3.2 | 31 | 19.8 | | | 31 | 51.2 | 31 | 3.2 | 31 | 0.0 | 31 | 0.0 | 31 | 3.2 | | |
| Arabs (Sudan) | Afro-Asiatic (Semitic) | 102 | 15.7 | | | 102 | 3.9 | 102 | 16.7 | | | 102 | 47.1 | | | | | | | | | | |
| Arabs (Tunisia) | Afro-Asiatic (Semitic) | 148 | 6.8 | 148 | 0.0 | 148 | 0.0 | 148 | 54.5 | 148 | 1.4 | 148 | 30.6 | | | 148 | 0.0 | 148 | 0.7 | 148 | 0.0 | | |
| Arabs (Libya) | Afro-Asiatic (Semitic) | 63 | 3 | 63 | 1.5 | 63 | 1.5 | 63 | 52.0 | 63 | 0.0 | 63 | 24.0 | 63 | 8.0 | | | 63 | 5.0 | 63 | 1.5 | | |
| Armenians | IE (Armenian) | 89 | 24.7 | 89 | 5.6 | 100 | 5.0 | 89 | 3.4 | | | 89 | 29.2 | 100 | 11.0 | 89 | 3.4 | | | | | | |
| Armenians | IE (Armenian) | 734 | 32.4 | 734 | 5.3 | | | 734 | 5.4 | | | | | | | | | | | 734 | 1.6 | | |
| Aromanians (Dukasi, Albania) | IE (Romance) | 39 | 2.56; 1/39 | 39 | 2.56; 1/39 | 39 | 17.95; 7/39 | 39 | 17.95; 7/39 | 39 | 0.0 | 39 | 48.72; 19/39 | 39 | 10.26; 4/39 | 39 | | 39 | | 39 | | | |
| Aromanians (Andon Poci, Albania) | IE (Romance) | 19 | 36.84; 7/19 | 19 | 0.0 | 19 | 42.11; 8/19 | 19 | 15.79; 3/19 | 19 | 0.0 | 19 | 5.26; 1/19 | 19 | 0.0 | 19 | | 19 | | 19 | | | |
| Aromanians (Kruševo, North Macedonia) | IE (Romance) | 43 | 27.91; 12/43 | 43 | 11.63; 5/43 | 43 | 20.93; 9/43 | 43 | 20.93; 9/43 | 43 | 0.0 | 43 | 11.63; 5/19 | 43 | 6.98; 3/19 | 43 | | 43 | | 43 | | | |
| Aromanians (Štip, North Macedonia) | IE (Romance) | 65 | 23.08; 15/65 | 65 | 21.54; 14/65 | 65 | 16.92; 11/65 | 65 | 18.46; 12/65 | 65 | 0.0 | 65 | 20.0; 13/65 | 65 | 0.0 | 65 | | 65 | | 65 | | | |
| Aromanians (Romania) | IE (Romance) | 42 | 23.81; 10/42 | 42 | 2.28; 1/42 | 42 | 19.05; 8/42 | 42 | 7.14; 3/42 | 42 | 0.0 | 42 | 33.33; 14/42 | 42 | 0.0 | | | | | | | | |
| Aromanians (Balkan) | IE (Romance) | 39+ 19+ 43+ 65+ 42= 208 | 21.63; 45/208 | 208 | 10.1; 21/208 | 208 | 20.67; 43/208 | 208 | 16.35; 34/208 | 208 | 0.0 | 208 | 25; 52/208 | 208 | 3.37; 7/208 | | | | | | | | |
| Ashkenazi Jews | Afro-Asiatic (Semitic) | | | 79 | 12.7 | | | 79 | 22.8; 18/79 | | | 79 | 43.0; 34/79 | | | | | | | 79 | 0.0 | | |
| Ashkenazi Jews | Afro-Asiatic (Semitic) | | | | | 442 | 4.1 | 442 | 19.7; 87/442 | 442 | 0.2 | 442 | 38.0; 168/442 | 442 | 9.7; 43/442 | 442 | 0.2 | | | 442 | 0.2 | | |
| Austrians | IE (Germanic, West) | 219 | 32 | 219 | 14 | | | | | | | | | | | | | | | | | | |
| Avars | Northeast Caucasian | 42 | 2.4 | 42 | 2.4 | 42 | 0.0 | 42 | 7.1 | | | 42 | 71.4; 30/42 | 42 | 0.0 | 42 | 0.0 | 42 | 4.8 | 42 | 9.5 | | |
| Azerbaijanis | Turkic, Oghuz | 72 | 11.1 | 72 | 6.9 | | | 97 | 4.1 | | | | | | | | | | | | | | |
| Azerbaijanis (West Azerbaijan Province) | Turkic, Oghuz | 63 | 17.5 | 63 | 19 | | | | | | | 63 | 27.2 | | | | | | | | | | |
| Bagvalal | Northeast Caucasian | 28 | 67.9 | 28 | 3.6 | 28 | 7.1 | 28 | 0.0 | | | 28 | 21.4 | 28 | 0.0 | 28 | 0.0 | 28 | 0.0 | 28 | 0.0 | | |
| Balkarian | Turkic, Kipchak | | | | | | | 39 | 2.6 | | | 16 | 25.0 | | | | | | | | | | |
| Balkarians | Turkic, Kipchak | 38 | 13.2 | 38 | 13.2 | 38 | 2.6 | 38 | 2.6 | 38 | 0.0 | 38 | 23.7 | 38 | 28.9 | 38 | 0.0 | 38 | 0.0 | 38 | 5.3 | | |
| Baloch | IE (Iranian, NW) | 25 | 8.0 | 25 | 28.0 | 25 | 0.0 | 25 | 8.0 | 25 | 0.0 | 25 | 16.0 | 25 | 0.0 | 25 | 0.0 | 25 | 0.0 | 25 | 24.0 | | |
| Bashkirs (Perm) | Turkic, Kipchak | 43 | 86.05; 37/43 | 43 | 9.3 | 43 | 0.0 | 43 | 0.0 | 43 | 0.0 | 43 | 0.0 | 43 | 2.3 | 43 | 2.3 | 43 | 0.0 | 43 | 0.0 | | |
| Basque (France, Spain) | Basque (Basque) | 67 | 88.06; 59/67 | 67 | 0.0 | 67 | 7.46; 5/67 | 67 | 1.49; 1/67 | | | 67 | 2.99; 2/67 | 67 | 0.0 | 67 | 0.0 | 67 | 0.0 | 67 | 0.0 | | |
| German Bavarians | IE (Germanic, West) | 80 | 50.0; 40/80 | 80 | 15.0 | | | 80 | 8.0 | | | 80 | 5.0 | | | 80 | 0.0 | 80 | 0.0 | | | | |
| Belgians | IE (Germanic/Romance) | 92 | 63.04; 58/92 | 92 | 4.0 | | | 92 | 2.0 | | | | | | | | | | | | | | |
| Belarusians | IE (Slavic, East) | 41 | 0.0 | 41 | 39.0 | 147 | 19.0 | 41 | 10.0 | | | | | | | 41 | 2.4 | | | | | | |
| Belarusians | IE (Slavic, East) | 68 | 4.4 | 68 | 45.6 | 68 | 25.0 | 68 | 4.4 | | | | | 68 | 1.5 | 68 | 8.8 | | | | | | |
| Belarusians | IE (Slavic, East) | 306 | 4.2 | 306 | 51.0 | | | 306 | 4.6 | | | 306 | 3.3 | | | 306 | 9.5 | | | | | | |
| Bearnais | IE (Romance) | | | | | 26 | 7.7 | 43 | 3.7 | | | 26 | 3.8 | | | | | | | | | | |
| Beja | Afro-Asiatic (Cushitic) | 42 | 4.76; 2/42 | 42 | 0.0 | 42 | 0.0 | 42 | 52.38; 22/42 | 42 | 0.0 | 42 | 38.1; 16/42 | 42 | 0.0 | 42 | 0.0 | 42 | 0.0 | 42 | 0.0 | | |
| Berbers (Marrakesh) | Afro-Asiatic (Berber) | | | | | | | 29 | 92.9 | | | | | | | | | | | | | | |
| Berbers (Moyen Atlas) | Afro-Asiatic (Berber) | | | | | | | 69 | 87.1 | | | | | | | | | | | | | | |
| Berbers (Mozabite) | Afro-Asiatic (Berber) | | | | | | | 20 | 80.0 | | | | | | | | | | | | | | |
| Berbers (Morocco) | Afro-Asiatic (Berber) | | | | | | | 64 | 88.2 | 64 | 0 | 103 | 0 | | | | | | | | | | |
| Berbers (north Morocco) | Afro-Asiatic (Berber) | 43 | | | | | | 43 | 79.5 | | | | | | | | | | | | | | |
| Berbers (north-central Morocco) | Afro-Asiatic (Berber) | | | | | | | 63 | 88.8 | 63 | 0 | | | | | | | | | | | | |
| Berbers (central Morocco) | Afro-Asiatic (Berber) | 187 | | | | | | 187 | 89.8 | | | | | | | | | | | | | | |
| Berbers (southern Morocco) | Afro-Asiatic (Berber) | | | | | | | 40 | 89 | 40 | 0 | | | | | | | | | | | | |
| Berbers (southern Morocco) | Afro-Asiatic (Berber) | 65 | | | | | | 65 | 98.5 | | | | | | | | | | | | | | |
| Berbers (northern Tunisia) | Afro-Asiatic (Berber) | | | | | | | 32 | 100 | | | | | | | | | | | | | | |
| Berbers (southern Tunisia) | Afro-Asiatic (Berber) | | | | | | | 27 | 100 | | | | | | | | | | | | | | |
| Borgu (Sudan) | Nilo-Saharan (Maban) | 26 | 11.5 | 26 | 0.0 | 26 | 0.0 | 26 | 53.8 | 26 | 0.0 | 26 | 0.0 | 26 | 0.0 | 26 | 0.0 | 26 | 0.0 | 26 | 0.0 | | |
| Bosnians (Zenica) | IE (Slavic, South) | 69 | 1.45; 1/69 | 69 | 24.64; 17/69 | 69 | 53.62; 37/69 | 69 | 10.14; 7/69 | | | 69 | 0.0 | 69 | 4.35; 3/69 | | | | | | | | |
| Brahmins (Konkanastha) | IE (Indo-Aryan) | 25 | 0.0 | 25 | 48.0 | 25 | 0.0 | 25 | 0.0 | 25 | 0.0 | 25 | 16.0 | 25 | 0.0 | 25 | 0.0 | 25 | 0.0 | 25 | 4.0 | | |
| Brahui | Dravidian (Northern) | | | 110 | 39.1 | | | 110 | 0.0 | 110 | 2.7 | 110 | 28.2 | | | 110 | 0.9 | | | 110 | 7.3 | | |
| Brahui | Dravidian (Northern) | 25 | 0.0 | 25 | 24.0 | 25 | 0.0 | 25 | 0.0 | 25 | 0.0 | 25 | 28.0 | 25 | 16.0 | 25 | 0.0 | 25 | 0.0 | 25 | 8.0 | | |
| British | IE (Germanic, West) | 32 | 68.8; 22/32 | 32 | 9.4; 3/32 | | | | | | | | | | | | | | | | | | |
| Bulgarians | IE (Slavic, South) | | 11.1 | | 6.4 | | 30.2 | | 20.6 | | | | 17.5 | | | | | | 0.8 | | | | |
| Bulgarians | IE (Slavic, South) | | 11.0 | | 17.3 | | 27.5 | | 20.5 | | | | 18.1 | | | | | | 0.8 | | | | 0.8 |
| Bulgarians | IE (Slavic, South) | | 14 | | 16 | | 34 | | 21 | | | | 9 | | 2 | | 1 | | 2 | | | | |
| Burusho | Burushaski (isolate) | 97 | 1.0 | 97 | 27.8 | 97 | 0.0 | 97 | 0.0 | | | 97 | 8.2 | 97 | 1.0 | 97 | 0.0 | 97 | 0.0 | 97 | 16.5 | | |
| Spanish (Catalan people|Catalans) | IE (Romance) | 24 | 79.2; 19/24 | 24 | 0.0 | 32 | 4.2 | 33 | 6.1 | | | 28 | 3.6 | 24 | 8.0 | | | | | | | | |
| Cantabrians (Pasiegos) | IE (Romance) | | | | | | | 56 | 42.9 | | | | | | | | | | | | | | |
| Chamalins | Northeast Caucasian | 27 | 0.0 | 27 | 7.4 | 27 | 0.0 | 27 | 0.0 | | | 27 | 70.4 | 27 | 18.5 | 27 | 0.0 | 27 | 0.0 | 27 | 3.7 | | |
| Chechens | Northeast Caucasian | 330 | 1.8 | 330 | 3.9 | 330 | 0.0 | 330 | 0.0 | | | 330 | 77.6 | 330 | 5.5 | 330 | 0.0 | | | 330 | 7.0 | | |
| Chuvashes | Turkic, Oghur | 79 | 3.8 | 79 | 31.6 | 79 | 11.3 | 79 | 0 | 79 | 0 | 79 | 24.2 | 79 | 0 | 79 | 27.8 | 79 | 0 | 79 | 0 | | |
| Copts (Sudan) | Afro-Asiatic | 33 | 15.2 | | | | | 33 | 21.2 | | | 33 | 45.5 | | | | | | | | | | |
| Croats (mainland) | IE (Slavic, South) | 108 | 15.74; 17/108 | 108 | 34.26; 37/108 | 108 | 37.04; 40/108 | 108 | 5.56; 6/108 | 108 | 0.0 | 108 | 1.85; 2/108 | 108 | 0.93; 1/108 | | | | | | | | |
| Croat (mainland) | IE (Slavic, South) | | | | | 189 | 38.1; 72/189 | | | | | | | | | | | | | | | | |
| Cross River (Nigeria) | Cross River (NC) | 1113 | 0 | | | | | | | 1113 | 87 | 1113 | 0 | | | | | 1113 | 0 | | | | |
| Cypriots | IE (Greek) | 45 | 9.0 | 45 | 2.0 | | | 45 | 27.0 | | | | | | | | | | | | | | |
| Czechs | IE (Slavic, West) | | | 257 | 34.2 | 257 | 18.3 | 257 | 5.8 | | | 257 | 4.7 | 257 | 5.1 | 257 | 1.6 | | | | | | |
| Czechs and Slovaks | IE (Slavic, West) | 45 | 35.6 | 45 | 26.7 | 198 | 13.6 | 45 | 2.2 | | | | | | | | | | | | | | |
| Danes | IE (Germanic, North) | 12 | 31.7 | 12 | 26.7 | 194 | 38.7 | 35 | 2.9 | | | | | | | | | | | | | | |
| Dargins | Northeast Caucasian | 68 | 2.9 | 68 | 0.0 | | | | | | | 68 | 94.1 | 68 | 2.9 | 68 | 0.0 | 68 | 0.0 | 68 | 0.0 | | |
| Dargins | Northeast Caucasian | 26 | 4.0 | 26 | 0.0 | 26 | 58.0 | 26 | 4.0 | | | 26 | 4.0 | 26 | 4.0 | 26 | 0.0 | 26 | 0.0 | 26 | 0.0 | | |
| Dolgans | Turkic, Siberia | 67 | 1.5 | 67 | 16.4 | 67 | 1.5 | | | | | | | | | 67 | 34.3 | | | | | | |
| Druze (Arabs) | Afro-Asiatic (Semitic) | | | | | | | 28 | 14.3 | | | | | | | | | | | | | | |
| Dutch | IE (Germanic, West) | 27 | 70.4 | 27 | 3.7 | 30 | 26.7 | 84 | 8.0 | | | 34 | 0 | | | | | | | | | | |
| Egyptians | Afro-Asiatic (Semitic, West) | 370 | 5.94 | 370 | 2.16 | 370 | 0.54 | 370 | 43.78 | 370 | 2.43 | 370 | 27.56 | 370 | 5.68 | 370 | 0.00 | 370 | 6.22 | 370 | 0.81 | | |
| Egyptians | Afro-Asiatic (Semitic, West) | 92 | 5.4 | 92 | 0.0 | 92 | 1.1 | 92 | 43.5 | 92 | 3.3 | 92 | 22.8 | 92 | 2.2 | 92 | 0.0 | 92 | 7.6 | 92 | 0.0 | | |
| Egyptians (North) | Afro-Asiatic (Semitic, West) | 43 | 9.3 | 43 | 2.3 | 43 | 0.0 | 43 | 53.5 | | | 44 | 18.2 | 43 | 7.0 | | | 43 | 2.3 | 43 | 0.0 | | |
| Egyptians (South) | Afro-Asiatic (Semitic, West) | 29 | 13.8 | 29 | 0.0 | 29 | 3.4 | 29 | 31.0 | | | 29 | 24.1 | 29 | 17.2 | | | 29 | 10.3 | 29 | 0.0 | | |
| English (Central) | IE (Germanic, West) | 215 | 61.9 | 215 | 3.3 | | | | | | | | | | | | | | | | | | |
| Estonians | Uralic (Finnic) | 207 | 9.0 | 118 | 37.3 | 210 | 18.6 | 207 | 3.0 | | | 207 | 1.0 | | | 207 | 40.6 | | | | | | |
| Finns | Uralic (Finnic) | 57 | 2.0 | 57 | 10.5 | | | 57 | 2.0 | | | | | | | 57 | 63.2 | | | | | | |
| Finns | Uralic (Finnic) | 38 | 0.0 | 38 | 7.9 | 38 | 28.9 | | | | | | | | | 38 | 63.2 | | | | | | |
| French | IE (Romance) | 23 | 52.2 | 23 | 0 | 23 | 17.4 | 40 | 8.0 | | | | | | | | | | | | | | |
| Frisians | IE (Germanic, West) | 94 | 56.0 | 94 | 7.0 | 94 | 29.0 | 94 | 2.0 | | | 94 | 6.0 | | | | | | | | | | |
| Frieslanders (Netherlands) | IE (Germanic, West) | 94 | 55.3 | 94 | 7.4 | 94 | 34.0 | 94 | 2.1 | | | 94 | 1.4 | | | | | | | | | | |
| Fur | Nilo-Saharan (Fur) | 32 | 0.0 | 32 | 0.0 | 32 | 0.0 | 32 | 59.4 | 32 | 0.0 | 32 | 6.3 | 32 | 0.0 | 32 | 0.0 | 32 | 0.0 | 32 | 0.0 | | |
| Gagauz (Kongaz) | Turkic, Oghuz | 48 | 10.4 | 48 | 12.5 | 48 | 31.3 | 48 | 16.7 | | | 48 | 8.3 | 48 | 10.4 | 48 | 4.2 | 48 | 6.3 | | | | |
| Gagauz (Etulia) | Turkic, Oghuz | 41 | 14.6 | 41 | 26.8 | 41 | 24.4 | 41 | 9.8 | | | 41 | 7.3 | 41 | 17.1 | 41 | 0.0 | 41 | 0.0 | | | | |
| Germans | IE (Germanic, West) | 3,000+ | 44; U106=18; L21=5; U152=9; DF27, DF19=9 others=3 | 3,000+ | 12 | 3,000+ | 20; I1=13; I2=7 | 3,000+ | 5 V13=5 | | | 3,000+ | 6 J2=5; J1=1 | 3,000+ | 5 | 3,000+ | 1 | | | | | | |
| Germans (West) | IE (German) | 48 | 47.9 | 48 | 8.1 | 16 | 37.5 | 16 | 6.2 | | | | | | | | | | | | | | |
| Germans (East) | IE (German) | | | | | | | | | | | | | | | | | | | | | | |
| Germans (Berlin) | IE (German) | 103 | 23.3 | 103 | 22.3 | 103 | 32 | 103 | 9.7 | | | | | 103 | 1.3 | | | | | | | | |
| Georgians | Kartvelian | 63 | 14.3 | 63 | 7.9 | 63 | 0.0 | 64 | 2.0 | | | 63 | 36.5 | 63 | 30.1 | | | 63 | 1.6 | 63 | 1.6 | | |
| Georgians | Kartvelian | 66 | 9.1 | 66 | 10.6 | 66 | 1.5 | 66 | 3.0 | 66 | 0.0 | 66 | 36.4 | 66 | 31.8 | 66 | 0.0 | 66 | 1.5 | 66 | 1.5 | | |
| Greeks | IE (Greek) | 92 | 19.6 | 92 | 16.3 | 92 | 9.8 | 92 | 21.8 | | | 92 | 22.9 | 92 | 3.3 | | | 92 | 4.3 | 92 | 1.1 | | |
| Greeks | IE (Greek) | 77 | 11.7; 9/77 | 77 | 15.6; 12/77 | 77 | 19.5; 15/77 | 77 | 20.8; 16/77 | 77 | | 77 | 16.9; 13/77 | 77 | 9.1; 7/77 | 77 | 0.0 | 77 | 0.0 | 77 | 6.49 others 5/77 | | |
| Greeks | IE (Greek) | 118 | 22.8 | 118 | 8.3 | 261 | 13.8 | 84 | 23.8 | | | 92 | 6.5 | | | | | | | | | | |
| Greeks | IE (Greek) | 171 | 13.5; 23/171 | 171 | 11.1; 19/171 | 171 | 15.8; 27/171 | 171 | 31.6; 54/171 | | | 171 | 19.9; 34/171 | 171 | 4.7; 8/171 | | | 171 | 1.8; 3/171 | | | | |
| Greeks (Crete) | IE (Greek) | 193 | 17.0; 33/193 | 193 | 8.8; 17/193 | 193 | 13.0; 25/193 | 193 | 8.8; 17/193 | | | 193 | 38.9; 75/193 | 193 | 10.9; 21/193 | | | 193 | 2.1; 4/193 | | | | |
| Greeks (Crete) | IE (Greek) | 171+ 193= 364 | 15.38; 56/364 | 364 | 9.89; 36/364 | 364 | 14.29; 52/364 | 364 | 19.51; 71/364 | | | 364 | 29.95; 109/364 | 364 | 7.97; 29/364 | | | 364 | 1.92; 7/364 | | | | |
| Greeks (Peloponnese) | IE (Greek) | | | | | | | 36 | 47.44; 17/36 | | | 36 | 13.89; 5/36 | | | | | | | | | | |
| Greeks (Thrace) | IE (Greek) | 41 | 12.2 | 41 | 22.0 | 41 | 19.5 | 41 | 19.5 | 41 | 0.0 | 41 | 19.5 | 41 | 4.9 | | | | | | | | |
| Greeks (North) | IE (Greek) | 96 | 14.6= 14/96 | 96 | 18.8; 18/96 | 96 | 12.5; 12/96 | 96 | 35.4; 34/96 | | | | | 96 | 5.2; 5/96 | | | 96 | 2.1; 2/96 | 96 | 1.0; 1/96 | | |
| Greeks (South) | IE (Greek) | 46 | 19.6; 9/46 | 46 | 2.2; 1/46 | 46 | 23.9; 11/46 | 46 | 43.5; 20/46 | | | | | 46 | 6.5; 3/46 | | | 46 | 2.2; 1/46 | 46 | 0.0 | | |
| Greeks (North) + (South) | IE (Greek) | 96+ 46= 142 | 16.2; 23/142 | 96+ 46= 142 | 13.4; 19/142 | 96+ 46= 142 | 16.2; 23/142 | 96+ 46= 142 | 38; 54/142 | | | | | 96+ 46= 142 | 5.6; 8/142 | | | 96+ 46= 142 | 2.1; 3/142 | 96+ 46= 142 | 0.7; 1/142 | | |
| Hausa (Sudan) | Afro-Asiatic (Chadic) | 32 | 40.6 | 32 | 0.0 | 32 | 0.0 | 32 | 3.1 | 32 | 12.5 | 32 | 0.0 | 32 | 0.0 | 32 | 0.0 | 32 | 0.0 | 32 | 0.0 | | |
| Herzegovinians (Mostar, Široki Brijeg) | IE (Slavic, South) | 141 | 3.55; 5/141 | 141 | 12.06; 17/141 | 141 | 63.83; 90/141 | 141 | 8.51; 12/141 | | | 141 | 1.42; 2/141 | | | | | | | | | | |
| Hungarians | Uralic (Ugric) | 45 | 18 | 113 | 30 | 162 | 17 | 53 | 8 | | | 49 | 9 | 103 | 3 | 103 | 1.0 | | | | | | |
| Icelanders | IE (Germanic, North) | 181 | 41.44; 75/181 | 181 | 23.76; 43/181 | 181 | 34.25; 62/181 | | | | | | | | | | | | | | | | |
| Ingush | Northeast Caucasian | 143 | 0.0 | 143 | 3.5 | 143 | 0.7 | 143 | 0.0 | | | 143 | 91.6 | 143 | 1.4 | | | | | 143 | 2.8 | | |
| Iranians (North Iran) | IE (Iranian, West) | 33 | 15.2 | 33 | 6.1 | 33 | 0.0 | 33 | 0.0 | 33 | 0.0 | 33 | 33.3 | 33 | 15.2 | 33 | 6.1 | 33 | 0.0 | 33 | 3.0 | | |
| Iranians (South Iran) | IE (Iranian, West) | 117 | 6.0 | 117 | 16.2 | 117 | 0.0 | 117 | 5.1 | 117 | 1.7 | 117 | 35.0 | 117 | 12.8 | 117 | 0.9 | 117 | 3.4 | 117 | 6.0 | | |
| Irish | IE (Celtic) | 222 | 81.53; 181/222 | 222 | 0.45 | 222 | 14.86; 33/222 | 257 | 2.25 | | | | | | | | | | | | | | |
| Italians | IE (Romance) | 50 | 62.0; 31/50 | 332 | 2.7 | 50 | 8.0 | 99 | 13.0 | | | | | 50 | 10.0 | | | | | | | | |
| Italians (Calabria) | IE (Romance) | 37 | 32.4 | | | 148 | 5.4 | 80 | 16.3 | | | 57 | 1.8 | | | | | | | | | | |
| Italians (Apulia) | IE (Romance) | | | | | 78 | 2.6 | 86 | 13.9 | | | 86 | 31.4 | | | | | | | | | | |
| Italians (North-central) | IE (Romance) | 50 | 62.0 | | | 390 | 0.5 | 212 | 10.4 | | | 52 | 26.9 | | | | | | | | | | |
| Italians (South) | IE (Romance) | 68 | 20.0 | 68 | 3.0 | 68 | 6.0 | 68 | 26.0 | | | | | 68 | 15.0 | | | 68 | 3.0 | 68 | 0.0 | | |
| Italians (Sicily) | IE (Romance) | | | | | 51 | 8.8 | 55 | 27.3 | | | 42 | 23.8 | | | | | | | | | | |
| Italians (East Sicily) | IE (Romance) | 87 | 20.0 | 87 | 2.3 | 87 | 5.0 | 87 | 29.0 | | | | | 87 | 5.0 | | | 87 | 5.0 | 87 | 0.0 | | |
| Italians (West Sicily) | IE (Romance) | 125 | 27.0 | 125 | 2.4 | 125 | 11.0 | 125 | 19.0 | | | | | 125 | 13.0 | | | 125 | 3.0 | 125 | 0.0 | | |
| Iyengar | Dravidian (Southern) | 30 | 0.0 | 30 | 30.0 | 30 | 0.0 | 30 | 0.0 | 30 | 0.0 | 30 | 20.0 | 30 | 13.3 | 30 | 0.0 | 30 | 0.0 | 30 | 16.7 | | |
| Iyer | Dravidian (Southern) | 29 | 0.0 | 29 | 27.6 | 29 | 0.0 | 29 | 0.0 | 29 | 0.0 | 29 | 17.2 | 29 | 10.3 | 29 | 0.0 | 29 | 0.0 | 29 | 17.2 | | |
| Japan | Japanese | 2390 | | | | | | | | | | | | | | 2390 | 1.3 | | | | | | |
| Kabardinian | Northwest Caucasian | | | | | | | | | | | | | | 29.0 | | | | | | | | |
| Kalash (Pakistan) | IE (Dardic) | | | 44 | 18.2 | 44 | 0.0 | 44 | 0.0 | | | 44 | 9.1 | 44 | 18.2 | 44 | 0.0 | 44 | 0.0 | 44 | 25.0 | | |
| Karakalpaks | Turkic, Kipchak | 44 | 9.1 | 44 | 18.2 | 44 | 0.0 | 44 | 0.0 | | | | | | | | | | | 44 | 4.5 | | |
| Kazakhs (more) | Turkic | 1982 | 6 | 1982 | 7 | 1982 | 1 | | | | | 1982 | 8 | | | 1982 | 7 | | | | | | |
| Kazakhs (more) | Turkic, Kipchak | 54 | 5.6 | 54 | 3.7 | 54 | 0.0 | 54 | 0.0 | | | 38 | 0.0 | | | 54 | 1.9 | 54 | 0.0 | | | | |
| Khants | Uralic (Ugric) | 47 | 19.15; 9/47 | 47 | 4.25; 2/47 | 47 | 0.0 | | | | | | | | | 47 | 76.6; 36/47 | | | | | | |
| Komi | Uralic (Finnic) | 94 | 16.0 | 94 | 33.0 | 94 | 5.3 | | | | | | | | | 94 | 35.1 | | | | | | |
| Komi (Izhemsky) | Uralic (Finnic) | 54 | 0.0 | 54 | 29.63; 16/54 | 54 | 1.9 | 54 | 0.0 | 54 | 0.0 | 54 | 0.0 | 54 | 0.0 | 54 | 68.52; 37/54 | 54 | 0.0 | 54 | 0.0 | | |
| Komi (Priluzsky) | Uralic (Finnic) | 49 | 2.0 | 49 | 32.65; 16/49 | 49 | 4.1 | 49 | 0.0 | 49 | 0.0 | 49 | 0.0 | 49 | 0.0 | 49 | 61.22; 30/49 | 49 | 0.0 | 49 | 0.0 | | |
| Kumyks | Turkic, Kipchak | 76 | 19.7 | 76 | 13.2 | 76 | 0.0 | 76 | 2.6 | | | 76 | 46.1 | 76 | 11.8 | 76 | 0.0 | 76 | 1.3 | 76 | 0.0 | | |
| Kurds (Northern Iraq) | IE (Iranian, NW) | 95 | 16.8 | 95 | 11.6 | 95 | 16.8 | 95 | 7.4 | | | 95 | 40.0 | | | | | 95 | 4.2 | 95 | 3.2 | | |
| Kyrgyz | Turkic, Kipchak | 52 | 1.9 | 52 | 42 | 52 | 1.9 | 52 | 0.0 | | | 41 | 4.9 | | | 41 | 2.4 | | | 52 | 0.0 | | |
| Latvians | IE (Baltic) | 34 | 15.0 | 114 | 39.5 | 86 | 7.0 | 114 | 0.9 | | | | | | | 114 | 42.1 | | | | | | |
| Lebanese | Afro-Asiatic (Semitic) | 1,116 | 7.6 & Haber2011 | 1,116 | 2.1 & Haber2011 | 1,116 | 3.5 & Haber2011 | 1,116 | 16.75 & Haber2011 | 1,116 | 1 & Haber2011 | 1,116 | 50 & Haber2011 | 1,116 | 6.9 & Haber2011 | 1,116 | 0.1 & Haber2011 | 1,116 | 4.7 & Haber2011 | 1,116 | 5.2 & Haber2011 | | |
| Lebanese | Afro-Asiatic (Semitic) | 914 | 8.1 | 914 | 2.5 | 914 | 4.8 | 914 | 16.2 | 914 | 0.7 | 914 | 46.1 | 914 | 6.6 | 914 | 0.1 | 914 | 4.7 | 914 | 5.2 | | |
| Lezgins | Northeast Caucasian | 31 | 16.1 | 31 | 0.0 | 31 | 9.7 | 31 | 6.5 | | | 31 | 58.1 | 31 | 9.7 | 31 | 0.0 | 31 | 0.0 | 31 | 0.0 | | |
| Lithuanians | IE (Baltic) | 38 | 5.0 | 114 | 36.0 | | | 114 | 0.9 | | | | | | | 114 | 43.0 | | | | | | |
| Macedonians (Skopje) | IE (Slavic, South) | 79 | 5.1 | 79 | 15.2 | 79 | 34.2 | 79 | 24.1 | | | 79 | 12.7 | 79 | 5.1 | | | | | | | | |
| Macedonians (Skopje) | IE (Slavic, South) | 52 | 13.5 | 52 | 13.5 | 52 | 28.8 | 52 | 23.1 | | | 52 | 11.5 | 52 | 3.8 | | | | | | | | |
| Macedonian Romani (Skopje) | IE (Indo-Aryan) | 57 | 1.8 | 57 | 1.8 | 57 | 3.5 | 57 | 29.8 | | | 57 | 1.8 | | | | | | | | | | |
| Maltese | Afro-Asiatic (Semitic) | 187 | 22.0 | 187 | 5.0 | 187 | 9.0 | 187 | 6.0 | | | | | 187 | 9.0 | | | 187 | 0.0 | 187 | 0.0 | | |
| Maratha | IE (Indo-Aryan) | 20 | 0.0 | 20 | 10.0 | | | 20 | 0.0 | 20 | 0.0 | 20 | 15.0 | | | | | | | 20 | 15.0 | | |
| Melanesia | Oceanic, Papuan | 1272 | | | | | | | | | | | | | | | | | | | | | |
| Moldovans (Karahasani) | IE (Romance) | 72 | 16.7 | 72 | 34.7 | 72 | 25.0 | 72 | 12.5 | | | 72 | 9.7 | 72 | 0.0 | 72 | 1.4 | 72 | 0.0 | | | | |
| Moldovans (Sofia) | IE (Romance) | 54 | 16.7 | 54 | 20.4 | 54 | 35.2 | 54 | 13.0 | | | 54 | 5.6 | 54 | 1.9 | 54 | 3.7 | 54 | 1.9 | | | | |
| Erzya | Uralic (Finnic) | | | 46 | 39.1 | | | | | | | | | | | | | | | | | | |
| Moksha | Uralic (Finnic) | | | 46 | 21.7 | | | | | | | | | | | | | | | | | | |
| Moksha | Uralic (Finnic) | 83 | 13.3 | 83 | 26.5 | 83 | 19.3 | | | | | | | | | 83 | 19.3 | | | | | | |
| Mari | Uralic (Finnic) | 111 | 2.7 | 111 | 47.7 | 111 | 8.1 | | | | | | | | | 111 | 41.4 | | | | | | |
| Mari | Uralic (Finnic) | 48 | 10.4 | 48 | 29.2 | | | 48 | 0.0 | | | 48 | 6.3 | | | 48 | 50.0 | | | | | | |
| Masalit | Nilo-Saharan (Maban) | 32 | 0.0 | 32 | 0.0 | 32 | 0.0 | 32 | 71.9; 23/32 | 32 | 0.0 | 32 | 6.3 | 32 | 0.0 | 32 | 0.0 | 32 | 0.0 | 32 | 0.0 | | |
| Moroccans | Afro-Asiatic (Berber) | 760 | 4.4 | 760 | 0 | 760 | 0.1 | 760 | 78.9 | 760 | 5.9 | 760 | 7.6 | 760 | 0.6 | | | | | | | | |
| Native North Americans | | 530 | 6.25 | 530 | 6.25 | | | | | | | | | | | | | | | | | | |
| Norwegians | IE (Germanic, North) | 112 | 25.9 | 112 | 17.9 | 72 | 40.3 | | | | | | | | | | | | | | | | |
| Norwegians | IE (Germanic, North) | | | 52 | 30.8 | | | 52 | 1.9 | | | 52 | 1.9 | | | 52 | 3.8 | 52 | 0.0 | 52 | 0.0 | | |
| Nubians (Sudan) | Nilo-Saharan (Eastern Sudanic) | 39 | 10.3 | 39 | 0.0 | 39 | 5.1 | 39 | 23.1 | 39 | 0.0 | 39 | 43.6 | | | 39 | 0.0 | 39 | 0.0 | 39 | 0.0 | | |
| Orcadians | IE (Celtic/Germanic) | 71 | 66.2; 47/71 | 71 | 19.72; 14/71 | | | | | | | | | | | | | | | | | | |
| Oromo | Afro-Asiatic (Cushitic) | 78 | 0.0 | 78 | 0.0 | 78 | 0.0 | 78 | 79.5; 62/78 | | | 78 | 3.8 | 78 | 0.0 | 78 | 0.0 | 78 | 5.1 | 78 | 0.0 | | |
| Ossetians | IE (Iranian, NE) | 47 | 42.6 | 47 | 2.1 | | | 47 | 6.0 | | | 47 | 34.0 | | 60.0 | | | | | | | | |
| Pallan | Dravidian (Southern) | 29 | 3.4 | 29 | 24.1 | 29 | 0.0 | 29 | 0.0 | 29 | 0.0 | 29 | 13.8 | 29 | 0.0 | 29 | 0.0 | 29 | 0.0 | 29 | 17.2 | | |
| Pashtuns | IE (Iranian, SE) | 96 | 4.2 | 96 | 44.8 | 96 | 0.0 | 96 | 2.1 | | | 96 | 6.3 | 96 | 11.5 | 96 | 0.0 | 96 | 1.0 | 96 | 12.5 | | |
| Poles | IE (Slavic, West) | 55 | 16.4 | 55 | 56.4 | 191 | 17.8 | 99 | 4.0 | | | 97 | 1.0 | | | | | | | | | | |
| Poles | IE (Slavic, West) | 93 | 13.4 | 93 | 55.9 | 93 | 16.1 | | | | | | | | | 93 | 3.2 | | | | | | |
| Portuguese | IE (Romance) | | | | | 303 | 5.3 | | | | | | | | | | | | | | | | |
| Portuguese (South) | IE (Romance) | 57 | 56.0 | 57 | 2.0 | | | 57 | 17.0 | | | | | | | | | | | | | | |
| Portuguese (North) | IE (Romance) | 328 | 62.0 | 328 | 0 | | | 328 | 11.0 | | | | | | | | | | | | | | |
| Rajputs | IE (Indo-Aryan) | 29 | 0.0 | 29 | 31.0 | | | 29 | 0.0 | 29 | 0.0 | 29 | 17.2 | | | | | | | 29 | 6.9 | | |
| Romani | IE (Indo-Aryan) | | | | | | | | | | | | | | | | | | | | | | 60 |
| Romanians | IE (Romance) | 54 | 13.0 | 54 | 20.4 | 54 | 48.1 | 54 | 7.4 | | | 54 | 5.6 | 54 | 5.6 | 54 | 0.0 | 54 | 0.0 | | | | |
| Romanians | IE (Romance) | | | | | 361 | 22.2 | | | | | | | | | | | | | | | | |
| Romanians (Constanța) | IE (Romance) | 31 | 16.1 | 31 | 9.7 | 31 | 41.9 | 31 | 9.7 | 31 | 0.0 | 31 | 6.5 | 31 | 12.9 | 31 | 0.0 | 31 | 0.0 | 31 | 0.0 | | |
| Romanians (Ploiești) | IE (Romance) | 36 | 8.3 | 36 | 5.6 | 36 | 38.9 | 36 | 16.7 | 36 | 0.0 | 36 | 19.4 | 36 | 8.3 | 36 | 0.0 | 36 | 0.0 | 36 | 0.0 | | |
| Russians | IE (Slavic, East) | 122 | 6.6 | 122 | 46.7 | | | 122 | 6.6 | | | 122 | 4.1 | | | 122 | 18.0 | | | | | | |
| Russians | IE (Slavic, East) | 414 | 6.8 | 414 | 48.3 | 414 | 15.9 | 414 | 4.8 | 414 | 0.0 | 414 | 1.4 | 414 | 1.2 | 414 | 14.0 | | | | | | |
| Russians (Pinega) | IE (Slavic, East) | 114 | 14.0 | 114 | 40.0 | 114 | 5.3 | 114 | 0.0 | 114 | 0.0 | 114 | 0.9 | 114 | 1.3 | 114 | 39.3 | 114 | | 114 | | | |
| Russians (Central) | IE (Slavic, East) | 364 | 7.7 | 364 | 47.0 | 364 | 16.5 | 364 | 5.0 | 364 | 0.0 | 364 | 3.3 | 364 | 0.0 | 364 | 16.0 | 364 | | | | | |
| Russians (Southern) | IE (Slavic, East) | 484 | 4.8 | 484 | 56.9 | 484 | 21.0 | 484 | 1.8 | 484 | 0.0 | 484 | 3.5 | 484 | 1.0 | 484 | 10.0 | | | | | | |
| Russians (Oryol region) | IE (Slavic, East) | 110 | 3.6 | 110 | 62.7 | 110 | 22.7 | 110 | 0.9 | 110 | 0.0 | 110 | 0.9 | 110 | 0.0 | 110 | 5.4 | | | | | | |
| Russians (Voronezh region) | IE (Slavic, East) | 96 | 5.2 | 96 | 59.4 | 96 | 20.8 | 96 | 1.0 | 96 | 0.0 | 96 | 3.1 | 96 | 2.1 | 96 | 6.3 | | | | | | |
| Russians (Tver region) | IE (Slavic, East) | 73 | 6.8 | 73 | 56.2 | 73 | 15.0 | 73 | 4.1 | 73 | 0.0 | 73 | 4.1 | 73 | 0.0 | 73 | 11.0 | | | | | | |
| Russians (Kuban Cossacks) | IE (Slavic, East) | 90 | 8.8 | 90 | 47.3 | 90 | 24.2 | 90 | 3.3 | 90 | 0.0 | 90 | 4.4 | 90 | 1.1 | 90 | 7.7 | | | | | | |
| Russians (Novgorod region) | IE (Slavic, East) | 38 | 8.1 | 38 | 54.1 | 38 | 10.8 | | | | | | | | | | | | | | | | |
| Sami (Sweden) | Uralic (Finnic) | 38 | 7.9 | 38 | 15.79; 6/38 | 38 | 31.58; 12/38 | 38 | 0.0 | 38 | 0.0 | 38 | 0.0 | 38 | 0.0 | 38 | 44.74; 17/38 | 38 | 0.0 | 38 | 0.0 | | |
| Sami | Uralic (Finnic) | 127 | 3.9 | 127 | 11.0 | 35 | 31.4 | | | | | 14 | | | | 127 | 47.2; 60/127 | | | | | | |
| Saharawis (Western Sahara) | Afro-Asiatic (Semitic) | | | | | | | 29 | 79.31; 23/29 | 29 | 3.4 | 29 | 17.2 | | | | | | | | | | |
| Sardinians (Italy) | IE (Romance) | 77 | 22.1 | | | 142 | 42.3 | 139 | 5.0 | | | 144 | 12.5 | | | | | | | | | | |
| Sardinians (Northern Sardinia) | IE (Romance) | 86 | 20.0 | 86 | 0.0 | 86 | 28.0 | 86 | 13.0 | | | | | 86 | 21.0 | | | 86 | 0.0 | 86 | 0.0 | | |
| Sardinians (Southern Sardinia) | IE (Romance) | 187 | 19.0 | 187 | 1.0 | 187 | 35.0 | 187 | 11.0 | | | | | 187 | 14.0 | | | 187 | 0.0 | 187 | 0.0 | | |
| Scots | IE (Celtic) | 61 | 77.05; 47/61 | 61 | 6.6 | 178 | 11.2 | | | | | | | | | | | | | | | | |
| Serbs (Serbia) | IE (Slavic, South) | 113 | 10.6 | 113 | 15.9 | 113 | 36.28; 41/113 | 113 | 21.2 | | | 113 | 8 | | | | | | | | | | |
| Serbs (Bosnia) | IE (Slavic, South) | 81 | 6.2 | 81 | 13.6 | 81 | 40.74; 33/81 | 81 | 22.22; 8/81 | 81 | 0.0 | 81 | 9.9 | 81 | 1.2 | 81 | 6.2 | 81 | 0.0 | 81 | 0.0 | | |
| Slovenians | IE (Slavic, South) | 75 | 21.33; 16/75 | 75 | 38.67; 29/75 | 75 | 30.67; 23/75 | 75 | 2.7 | 75 | 0.0 | 75 | 4.0 | 75 | 2.7 | 75 | 0.0 | 75 | 0.0 | 75 | 0.0 | | |
| Slovenian | IE (Slavic, South) | | | 70 | 37.1; 26/70 | | | 70 | 7.1 | | | 70 | 5.7 | | | 70 | 0.0 | 70 | 0.0 | 70 | 0.0 | | |
| Slovenian | IE (Slavic, South) | | | | | 55 | 38.2; 21/55 | | | | | | | | | | | | | | | | |
| Dir and Isaaq | Afro-Asiatic (Cushitic) | 201 | 0.0 | 201 | 1.0 | 201 | 0.0 | 201 | 77.6; 156/201 | 201 | 1.5 | 201 | 3.0 | 201 | 0.5 | 201 | 0.0 | 201 | 10.4 | 201 | 0.0 | | |
| Spanish | IE (Romance) | 126 | 68.0 | 126 | 2.0 | | | 126 | 10.0 | | | | | | | | | | | | | | |
| Spanish (Ibiza) | IE (Romance) | 54 | 57.4; 31/54 | 54 | 0.0 | 54 | 1.9 | 54 | 7.4 | | | | | 54 | 13.0 | | | 54 | 16.7 | 54 | 0.0 | | |
| Spanish (Majorca) | IE (Romance) | 62 | 66.13; 41/62 | 62 | 0.0 | 62 | 8.1 | 62 | 6.2 | | | | | 62 | 6.2 | | | 62 | 1.6 | 62 | 0.0 | | |
| Spanish (Menorca) | IE (Romance) | 37 | 73.0; 27/37 | 37 | 2.7 | 37 | 2.7 | 37 | 18.9 | | | | | 37 | 0.0 | | | 37 | 0.0 | 37 | 0.0 | | |
| Spanish (South) | IE (Romance) | 162 | 65.0 | 162 | 2.0 | 162 | 6.0 | 162 | 9.0 | | | | | 162 | 4.0 | | | 162 | 0.0 | 162 | 0.0 | | |
| Spanish (Valencia) | IE (Romance) | 73 | 64.0 | 73 | 3.0 | 73 | 10.0 | 73 | 11.0 | | | | | 73 | 1.0 | | | 73 | 1.0 | 73 | 0.0 | | |
| Swedes (Northern) | IE (Germanic, North) | 48 | 22.9 | 48 | 18.8 | 57 | 26.3 | 48 | 2.1 | | | 48 | 2.1 | | | 48 | 8.3 | | | | | | |
| Swedes | IE (Germanic, North) | 110 | 20.0 | 110 | 17.3 | 225 | 40 | | | | | | | | | | | | | | | | |
| Swedes | IE (Germanic, North) | 160 | 13.1 | 160 | 24.4 | 160 | 37.5 | 160 | 1.3 | | | 160 | 0.0 | | | 160 | 14.4 | | | | | | |
| Swiss | IE (German/Romance) | | | | | 144 | 7.6 | | | | | | | | | | | | | | | | |
| Tabassarans | Northeast Caucasian | 43 | 39.5 | 43 | 2.3 | 43 | 0.0 | 43 | 0.0 | | | 43 | 51.2 | 43 | 0.0 | 43 | 0.0 | 43 | 0.0 | 43 | 0.0 | | |
| Tamil Nadu (India) | Dravidian | 1680 | | 1680 | 8.2 | | | 1680 | 0.15 | 1680 | 0.15 | 1680 | 2.1 | 1680 | 3.1 | | | | | 1680 | 2.0 | 1680 | 23.6 |
| Tatars | Turkic, Kipchak | 126 | 8.7 | 126 | 34.1 | 126 | 4.0 | | | | | | | | | 126 | 23.0 | | | | | | |
| Turkmens | Turkic, Oghuz | 30 | 36.7 | 30 | 6.7 | 30 | 0.0 | 30 | 0.0 | | | 21 | 23.8 | | | 21 | 9.5 | | | 30 | 0.0 | | |
| Turks | Turkic, Oghuz | 523 | 16.1 | 523 | 6.9 | 741 | 5.1 | 523 | 11.3 | | | 523 | 33.5 | 523 | 10.9 | 523 | 3.8 | 523 | 2.5 | 523 | 4.2 | | |
| Turks | Turkic, Oghuz | 167 | 20.4 | 167 | 4.8 | | | 167 | 10.2 | | | 167 | 32.9 | | | 167 | 2.4 | | | | | | |
| Turks | Turkic, Oghuz | 59 | 20.3 | 59 | 11.9 | 59 | 6.8 | 59 | 13.6 | | | 59 | 30.5 | 59 | 8.5 | | | 59 | 1.7 | 59 | 0.0 | | |
| Turks (Central Anatolia) | Turkic, Oghuz | | | | | | | 61 | 6.6 | | | | | | | | | | | | | | |
| Turks (Istanbul) | Turkic, Oghuz | | | | | | | 46 | 13.0 | | | 73 | 24.7 | | | | | | | | | | |
| Turks (Konya) | Turkic, Oghuz | | | | | | | 117 | 14.5 | | | 129 | 31.8 | | | | | | | | | | |
| Turks (Cypriot) | Turkic, Oghuz | | | | | | | 46 | 13.0 | | | | | | | | | | | | | | |
| Turks (Southeastern) | Turkic, Oghuz | | | | | | | 24 | 4.2 | | | | | | | | | | | | | | |
| Turks (Erzurum) | Turkic, Oghuz | | | | | | | 25 | 4.0 | | | | | | | | | | | | | | |
| Udmurt | Uralic (Finnic) | 87 | 2.3 | 87 | 10.3 | 87 | 1.1 | | | | | | | | | 87 | 85.1 | | | | | | |
| Ukrainians | IE (Slavic, East) | 50 | 2.0 | 50 | 54.0 | 50 | 18.0 | 50 | 4.0 | | | 50 | 6.0 | 50 | 4.0 | 50 | 6.0 | 50 | 2.0 | 50 | 0.0 | | |
| Ukrainians | IE (Slavic, East) | 53 | 18.9 | 53 | 41.5 | 53 | 24.5 | 93 | 7.5 | | | 53 | 9.4 | 53 | 0.0 | 53 | 5.7 | 53 | 0.0 | | | | |
| Uyghurs (Kazakhstan) | Turkic, Karluk | 41 | 0.0 | 41 | 22.0 | 41 | 2.4 | 41 | 0.0 | 41 | 0.0 | 33 | 27.3 | | | 41 | 2.4 | 41 | 0.0 | 41 | 2.4 | | |
| Uyghurs (Xinjiang) | Turkic, Karluk | 68 | 17.6 | 68 | 22.1 | 68 | 0.0 | 68 | 0.0 | 68 | 0.0 | 68 | 10.3 | 68 | 4.4 | 67 | 6.0 | 67 | 0.0 | 68 | 4.4 | | |
| Uyghurs (Ürümqi) | Turkic, Karluk | 49 | 8.2 | 49 | 28.6 | | | 49 | 0.0 | 49 | 0.0 | 49 | 18.4 | | | | | | | | | | |
| Uyghurs (Northwest China) | Turkic, Karluk | | | 50 | 16.0 | | | | | | | 50 | 34.0 | | | 50 | 2.0 | | | | | | |
| Uyghurs (Ürümqi) | Turkic, Karluk | 31 | 19.4 | 31 | 22.6 | | | 31 | 6.5 | | | 31 | 25.8 | | | 31 | 9.7 | 31 | 0.0 | 31 | 0.0 | | |
| Uyghurs (Yili) | Turkic, Karluk | 39 | 15.4 | 39 | 15.4 | | | 39 | 0.0 | | | 39 | 0.0 | | | 39 | 7.7 | | | | | | |
| Uzbeks | Turkic, Karluk | 366 | 9.8 | 366 | 25.1 | 366 | 2.2 | 366 | 2.5 | | | 28 | 21.4 | | | 28 | 0.0 | | | 366 | 3.0 | | |
| Vanniyar | Dravidian (Southern) | 25 | 0.0 | 25 | 8.0 | | | 25 | 0.0 | 25 | 0.0 | 25 | 16.0 | | | | | | | 25 | 20.0 | | |
| Vellalar | Dravidian (Southern) | 31 | 0.0 | 31 | 12.9 | 31 | 0.0 | 31 | 0.0 | 31 | 0.0 | 31 | 38.7 | 31 | 0.0 | 31 | 0.0 | 31 | 0.0 | 31 | 16.1 | | |
| Welsh (Anglesey) | IE (Celtic) | 88 | 89.0; 78/88 | 88 | 1.0 | 196 | 8.1 | 88 | 3.0 | | | | | | | | | | | | | | |
| Yagnobis | IE (Iranian, NE) | 31 | 32.3; 10/31 | 31 | 16.1; 5/31 | 31 | 0.0 | 31 | 0.0 | | | 31 | 32.3; 10/31 | 31 | 0.0 | | | | | 31 | 9.7; 3/31 | | |
| Yakuts | Turkic, Siberia | 155 | 1.9 | 155 | 1.9 | 155 | 1.3 | | | | | | | | | 155 | 88.4; 137/155 | | | | | | |
| Yakuts | Turkic, Siberia | | | | | | | | | | | | | | | 10 | 80.0; 8/10 | | | | | | |
| Population | Language family | n | R1b | n | R1a | n | I | n | E1b1b | n | E1b1a | n | J | n | G | n | N | n | T | n | L | n | H |

== See also ==
- Genetics
  - Human mitochondrial DNA haplogroups
  - Human genome
  - Genetic genealogy
  - Genealogical DNA testing
  - Race and genetics
- Genetic history
- Timeline of human evolution
  - Recent African origin of modern humans
  - Genetic history of the British Isles
  - Genetic history of the Middle East
  - Genetics and archaeogenetics of South Asia
  - Genetic history of Europe
  - Genetic history of Italy
  - Genetic history of indigenous peoples of the Americas
  - Genetic studies on Jews
- Lists of Y-DNA haplogroups according to their distribution
  - List of haplogroups of historical and famous figures
- Y-chromosome haplogroups in populations of the world
  - Y-DNA haplogroups in populations of Europe
  - Y-DNA haplogroups in populations of the Near East
  - Y-DNA haplogroups in populations of North Africa
  - Y-DNA haplogroups in populations of South Asia
  - Y-DNA haplogroups in populations of Central and North Asia
  - Y-DNA haplogroups in populations of East and Southeast Asia
  - Y-DNA haplogroups in populations of Sub-Saharan Africa
  - Y-DNA haplogroups in populations of Oceania
  - Y-DNA haplogroups in indigenous peoples of the Americas
  - Haplogroup G (Y-DNA) by country
