= Konjara =

Konjara may refer to:

- Konjara ethnic group, also known as Fur people
- Konjara language, also known as Fur language
