= Amdang language =

Nilo-Saharan language of Chad and Sudan

Amdang
- sìmí amdangtí
- Native to: Chad, Sudan
- Region: Biltine, Wadi Fira
- Ethnicity: Amdang
- Native speakers: 170,000 (2024)
- Language family: Nilo-Saharan?: Fur; Amdang

Language codes
- ISO 639-3: amj
- Glottolog: amda1238
- ELP: Amdang
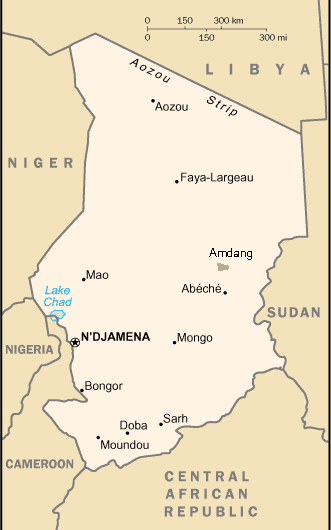
- Language map of Amdang (in grey)

Amdang (also Biltine; autonym: sìmí amdangtí) is a language closely related to Fur, which together constitute a branch of the Nilo-Saharan language family. It is mainly spoken in Chad, north of the town of Biltine, and sporadically elsewhere in Ouaddaï Region. There are also small colonies of speakers in Darfur near Woda'a and Fafa, and in Kordofan in the Abu Daza district and at Magrur north of Bara. Most of the ethnic group now speaks Arabic.

The language is also called Mimi, Mima or Biltine; the name "Mimi", however, is also applied to two extinct languages of the area; Mimi of Nachtigal and Mimi of Decorse.

Wolf (2010) provides lexical data for the Kouchane, Sounta, Yaouada, and Tere dialects of Amdang.

== Bibliography ==
- Paul Doornbos & M. Lionel Bender. 1983. "Languages of Wadai-Darfur", in ed. M. Lionel Bender, Nilo-Saharan Language Studies, African Studies Center, Michigan State University
- Joseph Greenberg. 1972. "On the identity of Jungraithmayr's Mimi", Africana Marburgensia 5.2: 45–49. Mouton, The Hague.
- H. Jungraithmayr. 1971. "How many Mimi Languages are there?", Africana Marburgensia 4.2: 62–69.
- H. MacMichael. 1967 (1922). A History of the Arabs in the Sudan. Barnes and Noble, New York.
- H. Carbou. 1912. La Région du Tchad et du Ouadai. Leroux, Paris.
- M. Gaudefroy-Demombynes. 1907. Documents sur Les Langues de l'Oubangui–Chari, Actes du XIVe Congres des Orientalistes (Alger 1905). Paris.

== See also ==
- Amdang word list (Wiktionary)
