= Karanga language (Chad) =

Maban language spoken in Chad

Karanga
- Native to: Chad
- Region: Ouaddaï
- Ethnicity: Karanga, Bakha (Fala), Kashmere, Koniere (Moyo)
- Native speakers: (10,000 cited 1999)
- Language family: Nilo-Saharan?: Maban; Mabang; Karanga

Language codes
- ISO 639-3: kth
- Glottolog: kara1484

Karanga is a Maban language spoken in Chad. Its speakers are divided into four groups, each of which has its own dialect: the Karanga (Kurunga), Kashmere (Kachmere), Bakha (Baxa, Bakhat) a.k.a. Fala (Faala), and Koniéré (Konyare, Kognere) a.k.a. Moyo (Mooyo). Karanga is closely related to the Masalit language.
