= Amdang =

Amdang may refer to:

- Amdang people
- Amdang language
