= Marfa language =

Maban language spoken in Chad

Marfa
- Marba
- Native to: Chad
- Region: Ouaddaï
- Ethnicity: Marfa people
- Native speakers: (5,000 cited 1999)
- Language family: Nilo-Saharan?: Maban; Mabang; Marfa

Language codes
- ISO 639-3: mvu
- Glottolog: marf1238

Marfa is a Maban language spoken in Chad. It is not a dialect of the Masalit language.
