= Maba language =

Maban language spoken in Chad and Sudan

Maba
- buraa mabaŋ بُرَا مَبَݝ
- Native to: Chad
- Region: Ouaddaï, Wadi Fira
- Ethnicity: Maba
- Native speakers: 570,000 (2019)
- Language family: Nilo-Saharan?: Maban; Mabang; Maba
- Dialects: Maba; Kodroy; Kabartu; Kondongo
- Writing system: Arabic script Latin

Language codes
- ISO 639-3: mde
- Glottolog: maba1277

Maba (Maban, Mabang, or Bura Mabang) is a Nilo-Saharan language of the Maban branch spoken in Chad and Sudan. It is divided into several dialects, and serves as a local trade language. Maba is closely related to the Masalit language. Most speakers of Maba reside in Chad with 542,000 speakers as of 2019. In 2022 there were 28,000 speakers in Sudan where the language is known as Sulaihab.

== Phonology ==
=== Vowels ===
	Front	Central	Back
Close	i iː		u uː
Open-mid	ɛ ɛː		ɔ ɔː
Open		a aː	

- /ɛ, ɛː/ and /ɔ, ɔː/ may be realized as more close [e, eː] and [o, oː], when found in open syllable positions.
- Vowels may also be marginally realized as nasal when in nasal environments.

=== Consonants ===
		Labial	Alveolar	Retroflex	Palatal	Velar	Glottal
Nasal		m	n		ɲ	ŋ	
Stop	voiceless	(p)	t	(ʈ)	c	k	
Stop	voiced	b	d	(ɖ)	ɟ	g	
Stop	prenasal	ᵐb	ⁿd	(ᶯɖ)	ᶮɟ	ᵑɡ	
Fricative	voiceless	f	s		ʃ		(h)
Fricative	voiced		(z)				
Rhotic			ɾ				
Lateral			l				
Approximant					j	w	

- Stop sounds /b, t, k/ are heard as unreleased [p̚, t̚, k̚] when in word-final position.
- Sounds [p, h] are heard mostly as a result of loanwords. [z] is also mostly from Arabic loanwords, but also may occur in some native words as well.
- /t, d, ⁿd/ when preceding a tap /ɾ/, are then heard as retroflex [ʈ, ɖ, ᶯɖ].
- /ɾ/ may also be heard as a trill [r] in free variation.

== Orthography ==
Maba language is written with the Latin and Arabic Chad Alphabet.

Maba Latin alphabet
A a	B b	C c	Ch ch	D d	Dr dr	E e (Ɛ ɛ)	F f	G g	H h	I i	J j	K k	Kh kh	L l	M m	Mb mb
[a]	[b]	[c]	[ʃ]	[d]	[ɖ]	[ɛ]	[f]	[g]	[h]	[i]	[ɟ]	[k]	[x]	[l]	[m]	[ᵐb]
N n	N̰ n̰	Nd nd	Ndr ndr	Nj nj	Ŋ ŋ	Ng ng	O o (Ɔ ɔ)	Pp	R r	S s	T t	Tr tr	U u	W w	Y y	Z z
[n]	[ɲ]	[ⁿd]	[ᶯɖ]	[ᶮɟ]	[ŋ]	[ᵑɡ]	[ɔ]	[p]	[ɾ] ([r])	[s]	[t]	[ʈ]	[u]	[w]	[j]	[z]

Maba Arabic alphabet
Arabic (Latin) [IPA]	أ إ ‌( - ) [∅]/[ʔ]	ب (B b) [b]	پ (P p) [p]	ت (T t) [t]	ث (T t) [t]	ج (J j) [ɟ]
Arabic (Latin) [IPA]	ڃ (Nj nj) [ᶮɟ]	چ (C c) [c]	ح (H h) [h]	خ (Kh kh) [x]	د (D d) [d]	ڊ (Nd nd) [ⁿd]
Arabic (Latin) [IPA]	ذ (S s) [s]	ر (R r) [ɾ] ([r])	ڔ (Dr dr) [ɖ]	ز (Z z) [z]	ڗ (Tr tr) [ʈ]	ژ (Ndr Ndr) [ᶯɖ]
Arabic (Latin) [IPA]	س (S s) [s]	ش (Ch ch) [ʃ]	ص (S s) [s]	ض (D d) [d]	ط (T t) [t]	ظ (Z z) [z]
Arabic (Latin) [IPA]	ع ( - ) [ʔ]	غ (Kh kh) [x]	ݝ (Ŋ ŋ) [ŋ]	ڠ (Ng ng) [ᵑɡ]	ف (F f) [f]	ق (G g) [g]
Arabic (Latin) [IPA]	ك (K k) [k]	ل (L l) [l]	م (M m) [m]	ݦ (Mb mb) [ᵐb]	ن (N n) [n]	ݧ (N̰ n̰) [ɲ]
Arabic (Latin) [IPA]	ه (H h) [h]	و (W w) [w]	ؤ ‌( - ) [ʔ]	ي (Y y) [j]	ئ ‌( - ) [ʔ]	

Vowel at beginning of word
A	E (Ɛ)	I	O (Ɔ)	U
أَ	أٚ	إِ	أٛ	أُ
Aa	Ee (Ɛɛ)	Ii	Oo (Ɔɔ)	Uu
آ	أٚيـ	إِيـ	أٛو	أُو

Vowel at middle and end of word
a	e (ɛ)	i	o (ɔ)	u	∅
◌َ	◌ٚ	◌ِ	◌ٛ	◌ُ	◌ْ
aa	ee (ɛɛ)	ii	oo (ɔɔ)	uu	
◌َا / ـَا	◌ٚيـ / ـٚيـ ◌ٚي / ـٚي	◌ِيـ / ـِيـ ◌ِي / ـِي	ٛ◌و / ـٛو	◌ُو / ـُو	

== Example ==
=== Sample text in Maba (Genesis 1) ===
Jul Kalaagu barnu kaa, samanu kan khalga torŋo. Barnu jaa, tiŋ lutok nambay bee tirr taka, luluyoonu enjii likkey bahar naanugu bik torŋoka, Kalaaginiŋ ruunu jaa enjiinun ner tal naŋ welet tire.

Aa suŋun ta Kalaagu «dey tiini» tirka, deynu tuyo. Deynu tuyoka, keree taanu tokoori. Aa suŋun ta deynugu luluyoonun ner tumbutuŋo. Deynugu dalka su kurin, luluyoonugu jaa iche su turiri. Barnu kondokur kin, wujaa subbo kaa tuyo. Waŋ jaa wonjoo owwoliinu ti. Wujaa kaa Kalaagu aa tirii: «Enjii naa n̰orogin wirii nokoy inda, enjiinugu tumbutoŋni», su ta Kalaagu wirii tindriyarka, wiriinu jaa enjiinugu tal kaa, lul kaa tumbutuŋo. Haddaa waŋ ta, lutoo waŋ tuyo. Aa suŋun ta Kalaagu wiriinugu sama su turiri. Barnu kondokur kin, wujaa subbo kaa tuyo. Waŋ jaa wonjoo mbuloonu ti.

Wujaa Kalaagu aa tirii: «Enjii yaak samanun ner lul nindaa waŋ, barik tek tay turŋoka, bar nojjir tujiini» tirka tuyo. Annaa taka ta, Kalaagu bar nojjirnugu bar su kurin, enjii tay nurŋoonugu jaa bahar su turiri. Waŋ jaa keree taanu tokoori.

=== Translation ===
In the beginning God created the heavens and the earth. Now the earth was formless and empty, darkness was over the surface of the deep, and the Spirit of God was hovering over the waters. And God said, “Let there be light,” and there was light. God saw that the light was good, and he separated the light from the darkness. God called the light “day,” and the darkness he called “night.” And there was evening, and there was morning—the first day.

And God said, “Let there be a vault between the waters to separate water from water.” So God made the vault and separated the water under the vault from the water above it. And it was so. God called the vault “sky.” And there was evening, and there was morning—the second day. And God said, “Let the water under the sky be gathered to one place, and let dry ground appear.” And it was so. God called the dry ground “land,” and the gathered waters he called “seas.” And God saw that it was good.
