= Mimi language =

Term used for multiple languages of Chad

Mimi is a name applied to several at-best distantly related Nilo-Saharan languages of the Wadai area of Chad. It is most commonly used for the Fur relative Amdang, with several tens of thousands of speakers, but also for two extinct and possibly Maban languages, Mimi of Nachtigal and Mimi of Decorse.

Tucker & Bryan (1956:53) state,

Several other languages, of which nothing is known, are said to be spoken in District Oum Hadjer [at the time in Wadai]. The people speaking them are known to the Arabs as RA TANING, i.e. 'those who speak the strange language'. The names MIGE or míkí, màkú, and mànyáŋ were recorded.

These names have occasionally appeared in language lists as putative Maban languages.
