= Maba people =

Ethnic group inhabiting Chad and Sudan

Bargo
برقو

Total population
- 570,000

Regions with significant populations
- Wadai and South Kordofan
- Chad: 542,000 (2019)
- Sudan: 28,000 (2022)

Languages
- Chadian Arabic, Sudanese Arabic, Bura Mabang

Religion
- Sunni Islam

Related ethnic groups
- Masalit, Tunjur, Fur, Nilo-Saharans

The Maba, also called Bargo or Wadai people, are a Sunni Muslim ethnic group found primarily in the mountains of Wadai region in eastern Chad and southern Sudan. Their population is estimated to be about 542,000. Other estimates place the total number of Bargo people in Sudan to be about 28,000.

The Bargo today primarily adhere to Islam, following the Maliki school of Sunni Islam. They supported the Sultans of Abeche and the Sudanic kingdoms, who spoke their language. Little is certain about their history before the 17th century. They are noted as having helped expel the Christian Tunjur dynasty and installed an Islamic dynasty in their region in the early 17th century. Their homelands lie in the path of caravan routes that connect the Sahel and West Africa with the Middle East. The Bargo people are an African people. They are traditionally pastoral and farmers who are clan-oriented.

The Bargo people have also been referred to as the Wadai, an alternate spelling for Ouaddaï. They speak Maba, a Nilo-Saharan language, of the Maban branch. Locally this language is called Bura Mabang. The first ten numerals in Bargo language, states Andrew Dalby, are "tek, bar, kungal, asal, tor, settal, mindri, rya, adoi, atuk", and this is very distant from other Nilo-Saharan languages. Although an ethnic group, their Bargo language was the state language of the Islamic Wadai Empire, and continued to be an important language when the Islamic Bornu Empire conquered these lands. Many Bargo people also speak Arabic, as their traditional trade language.

The Bargo people rebelled against the tribute demands of the Bornu Empire, and became sovereign people. They then led raids to southern regions for plunder and slaves from non-Muslim African ethnic groups. The African slaves of the Bargo people were absorbed in the Bargo tribal culture, and often they converted to escape slavery. In the 19th century, a powerful Bargo Sultanate on slave trading caravan route emerged under rulers such as Muhammad al-Sharif and Doud Murra. The Bargo Sultanate was abolished by the French in 1912, and the Bargo people's region thereafter annexed into the Ubangi-Shari colony. The Barg’s participated in the efforts to end the colonial rule and then in the civil wars in Chad.

Gustav Nachtigal, famous German explorer of Central and West Africa, described the Maba as the most arrogant and fanatical men he had ever met on his travels, stating that they were not only religious extremists, but also possessed a deep conviction in the superiority of their country, their king and themselves, which according to Nachtigal explained his aggressive behavior towards foreigners.

The Bargo people are subdivided into many sub-clans, each controlling certain grazing lands and sources of water. Among the various sub-clans, the largest are the Marfa,’’ salihab’’, Djene and Mandaba.

== See also ==
- Battle of Geneina
- Chad
- Darfur
- Jumjum
- South Sudan
