= Fur languages =

Small language family of Sudan and Chad

Fur
- For, Furan
- Geographic distribution: Sudan and Chad
- Linguistic classification: Nilo-Saharan?: Fur
- Subdivisions: Fur; Amdang

Language codes
- Glottolog: fura1235
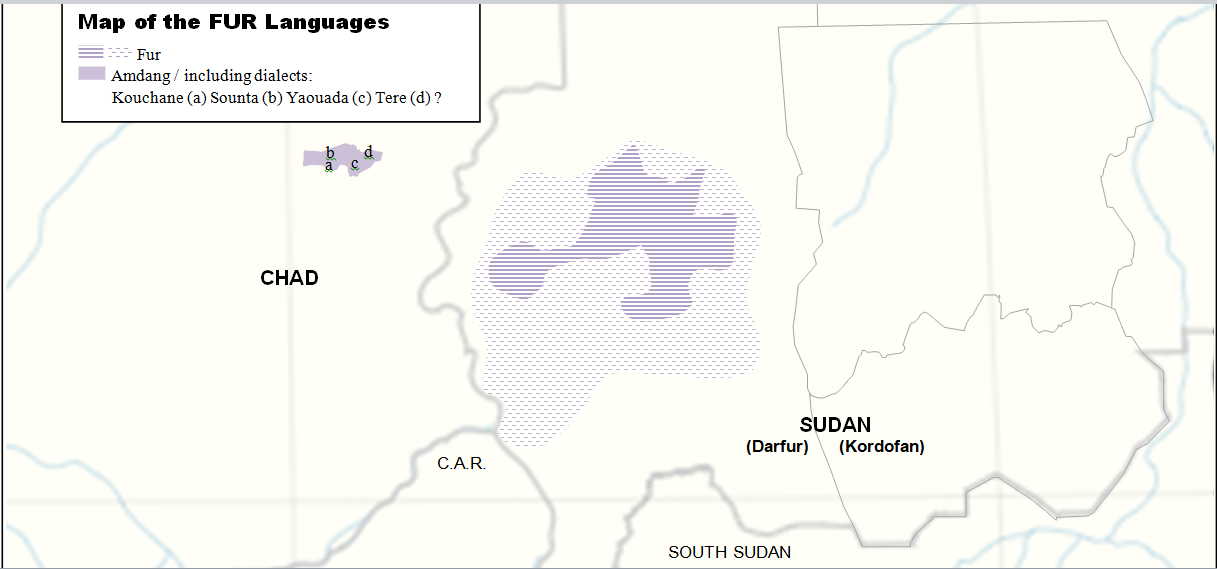
- Map of the Fur Languages

The Fur, Furan or For languages constitute a small, closely related family, which is a proposed member of the Nilo-Saharan family. Its members are:

- Fur in western Sudan and eastern Chad with around 745,600 speakers in 2004.
- Amdang (also called Mimi) in eastern Chad with around 41,100 speakers in 2000.
