= Surbakhal language =

Maban language of Chad

Surbakhal
- Sourbakhal
- Native to: Chad
- Region: Ouaddaï
- Native speakers: (7,900 cited 2000)
- Language family: Nilo-Saharan?: Maban; Surbakhal

Language codes
- ISO 639-3: sbj
- Glottolog: surb1238

Surbakhal is a Maban language of Chad.
