= Aiki language =

Maban language of Chad

Aiki
- Runga, Kibet
- Native to: Chad, Central African Republic
- Region: Salamat, Vakaga
- Ethnicity: Runga people
- Native speakers: (19,000 Kibet cited 1983); 43,000 Runga (1993–1996)
- Language family: Nilo-Saharan?: Maban; Aiki
- Dialects: Runga; Kibet; ? Dagal; ? Muru

Language codes
- ISO 639-3: Either: kie – Kibet rou – Runga
- Glottolog: rung1257
- Locations of Runga and Kibet

Aiki is a Maban language of Chad. It consists of two dialects, Runga and Kibet, which are divergent enough to be considered separate languages. Kibet (Kibeit, Kibeet, Kabentang) is spoken in Chad, while Runga (Roungo) is split between Chad and the CAR. Ayki (Aykindang) is a name used in CAR.

Possible dialects of Kibet are Dagal (Dagel, Daggal) and Muru (Murru, Muro, Mourro); however, they are poorly known, and Blench (2012) lists them separately.

The Aiki area is flooded half the year.

== Phonology ==
Consonants
	Labial	Alveolar	Palatal	Velar
Plosive	p b	t d	c ɟ	k g
Implosive	ɓ	ɗ		
Prenasalized	ᵐb	ⁿd	ᶮɟ	ᵑg
Fricative		s z	(ʃ)	
Nasal	m	n	ɲ	ŋ
Approximant	w	r, l	j	

- /p/ can be realized as [f].
- /ʃ/ is only found in Arabic loanwords.

Vowels
	Front	Central	Back
High	i i		u uː
Mid-high	e eː	(ə)	o oː
Mid-low	ɛ ɛː		ɔ ɔː
Low		a aː	

- [ə] only exists as an epenthetic vowel.

Additionally, the following diphthongs can be found: /ei/, /ɛi/, /ai/, /eu/, /əu/, /au/, /ou/.

There are two tones: high and low.
