= Kendeje language =

Maban language spoken in Chad

Kendeje
- Native to: Chad
- Region: Ouaddaï
- Native speakers: (1,900 cited 2000)
- Language family: Nilo-Saharan?: Maban; Kendeje
- Dialects: Yaali; Faranga

Language codes
- ISO 639-3: klf
- Glottolog: kend1253
- ELP: Kendeje

Kenjeje (or Kendeje) is a Maban language of Chad. The two dialects, Yaali and Faranga, are quite distinct, and have little contact.
