= Maban languages =

Language family of Central Africa

Maban
- Geographic distribution: Chad, Sudan, Central African Republic
- Linguistic classification: Nilo-Saharan?: (unclassified); Maban
- Proto-language: Proto-Maban
- Subdivisions: Mimi-N †; Kenjeje; Mabang; Masalit–Surbakhal; Aiki

Language codes
- Glottolog: maba1274
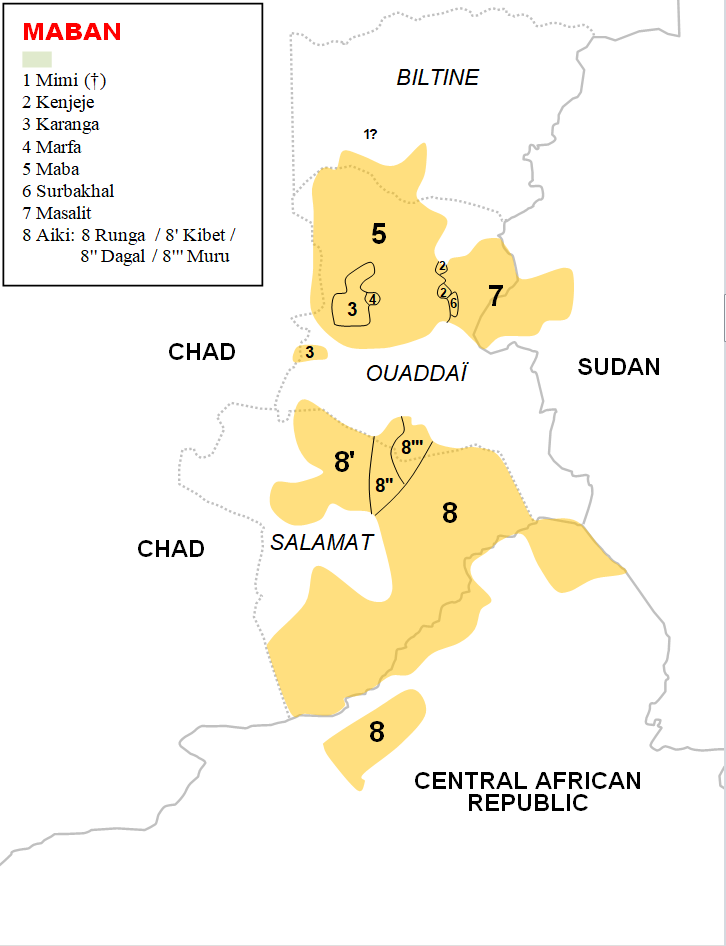

The Maban languages are a small family of languages which have been included in the hypothetical Nilo-Saharan language family.

Maban languages are spoken in eastern Chad, the Central African Republic and western Sudan (Darfur).

== Languages ==
The Maban branch includes the following languages:

- Mimi of Nachtigal
- Kenjeje (Yaali, Faranga)
- Masalit: Surbakhal, Masalit
- Aiki (Runga and Kibet, sometimes considered separate languages)
- Mabang: Karanga, Marfa, Maba

The languages attested in two word lists labelled "Mimi", collected by Decorse (Mimi-D) and Nachtigal (Mimi-N), have also been classified as Maban, though this has been contested. Mimi-N appears to have been remotely related to Maban proper, while Mimi-D appears to have not been Maban at all, with the similarities due to language contact with locally dominant Maba.

Blench (2021) gives the following classification:

- Proto-Maban
  - ? Mimi of Nachtigal
  - Aiki-Kibet
    - Aiki (= Runga)
    - Kibet
  - core branch
    - Kendeje
    - Masalit, Surbakhal
    - Maban (= Mabang)
      - Karanga
      - Marfa
      - Maba

== External relationships ==
Based on morphological evidence such as tripartite number marking on nominals, Roger Blench (2021) suggests that the closest relatives of the Maban languages may be the Eastern Sudanic languages, especially the Taman languages, which form a branch within Northern Eastern Sudanic.

Maban also shares lexical similarities with the Fur languages, Saharan languages, and even Songhay languages, but generally has more lexical matches with Eastern Sudanic languages. Lexical similarity may nonetheless be due to language contact, so that it constitutes less compelling evidence for genealogy than morphological similarity, for instance.

Glottolog considers Maban a small but separate language family.

== Comparative vocabulary ==
Blench (2021) posits the following consonants for proto-Maban:

(p) b	t d	tʃ		k ɡ
	s (z)	ʃ		(h)
m	n		ɲ	ŋ
w	l r		j	

Vowels likely were ATR pairs, with at least *a *ɛ *e *i *ɔ *o *u and possibly *ɪ *ʊ, plus length.

There were likely two register tones plus the possibility of contour tones on long vowels.

Sample basic vocabulary for Maban languages:

Language	eye	ear	nose	tooth	tongue	mouth	blood	bone	tree	water	eat	name
Proto-Maban	*kàSì-k		*dúrmì	*sati-k; *sàdí-k / *sadi-ɲi	*delemi-k		*fàrí-ŋ			*ta-k / *ta-si	*-aɲɔ-	*mílí-ik
Maba	kàʃì-k/-ñi	koi-k	boiñ	sati-k	delmi-k	kan-a/-tu	àríi	kàñjí-k	soŋgo-k	inji	-añ-	mílí-i/-síi
Masalit	kóo-gí/-sí	kwóyɛ̀	dúrmì	kácìŋgi	gélmèdì	kánà	fàríŋ	kónjì	síŋgì	sá	-iny-	mirsi/-ldiŋ
Aiki	kàs-`k/-ò	kàsá	mùndú	sàdí	àdìyím	yù-k	pày/-ó; fáai	jìŋg`r/jùŋgɔ̀rɔ̀	rí-k	tà-k	-ñɔ̀-	mèek-í/-ú
Kibet	kàs/-u	kàsá	mùndù	sàdí	àd`lɛ́m	yù-k	fal/-u; ari	njekedi/njùkùdú	ri-k	ta	-ñɔ̀-	m lk-i/-udɔ
Mimi of Nachtigal	kal	kuyi	hur	ziːk		mil	ari	kadʒi		sun (< Fur?)		
Mimi of Decorse	dyo	feɾ	fir	ɲain		ɲyo			su	engi	ɲyam	

=== Numerals ===
Comparison of numerals in individual languages:

Classification	Language	1	2	3	4	5	6	7	8	9	10
Maba	Maba	tɛ́ɡ, tɔ́ː	mbàːr, mbíːr, mbùl	kùŋàːl, káyáŋ	àssàːl, ássíː	tùːr, túːr	sit̀tàːl, síttíː < Arabic sitta	mɛ́ndrìː	íyyáː	ɔ̀ddɔ̀yí	ɔ̀ttúɡ
Masalit	Masalit (1)	tíyóŋ	mbárá	káaŋ	áás	tóór	ít̪í	màrí	àd̪á	àyi	ùt̪úk
Masalit	Masalit (2)	tîyom (without noun), tîle (with n.)	mbara	kaŋ	as	tur	iti	mâri	aya	adey	ûtuk
Masalit	Masalit (3)	tyǒm (without noun), tíiilò (with n.)	mbárá	káaŋ	ás	túr	ítí	màrí	àyá	àdɛ́i	ùtúk
Runga-Kibet	Kibet	doˈwai	mbaʀ	kʰasaŋˈɡal	ʔaːtal	tor	ʔiˈsal	mɪndɪrˈsɪʔ	mbaːkʰl	kʰaˈdɛijə	juˈtʊk̚
Runga-Kibet	Runga	kʰanˈda	mba	kʰazaŋɡa	attɛi	tur	izɛi	mɪnˈdirsi	mbɑkadeli	kʰaddɛl	jtuk̚

== See also ==
- Maban word lists (Wiktionary)
