= Maurice Gaudefroy-Demombynes =

French Arabist (1862–1957)

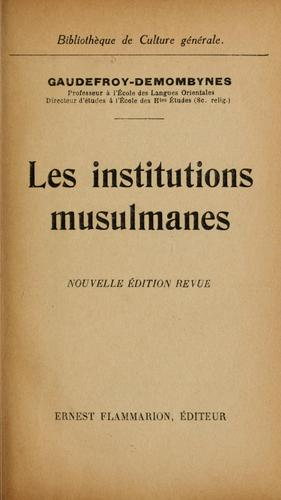
- Born: 15 December 1862; Renancourt-lès-Amiens
- Died: 12 August 1957 (aged 94); Hautot-sur-Seine
- Occupation: Scholar

Maurice Gaudefroy-Demombynes (15 December 1862 – 12 August 1957) was a French Arabist, a specialist in Islam and the history of religions.

His best known works are his historical and religious studies on Hajj and Muslim institutions. He also translated into French in an annotated edition the story of Arab travel writer and explorer Ibn Jubair (1145–1217). His book written after Arab authors on Syria at the time of the Mamluk is also a seminal work.

Maurice Gaudefroy-Demombynes was a professor at the École nationale des langues orientales vivantes (today INALCO).

== Works ==
- 1898: Ibn Khaldoun : Les Rois de Grenade (translation)
- 1900: Les Cérémonies du mariage en Algérie
- 1923: Le Pèlerinage à la Mekke. Étude d'histoire religieuse. (Annales of the Guimet Museum: Bibliothèque d'études; 33)
- 1921: Les Institutions musulmanes
- 1957: Mahomet. L'Homme et son message
- 1931: (in collaboration with S.F. Platonov) Le Monde musulman et byzantin jusqu'aux croisades. Paris, E. de Boccard, (Histoire du Monde 7,1)
- 1925: (in collaboration with Louis Mercier) Manuel d'arabe marocain. Grammaire et dialogues. New edition revised and enlarged by Louis Mercier. Société d'éditions géographiques, maritimes et coloniales
- 1923: La Syrie à l'époque des Mamelouks d'après les auteurs arabes: description géographique, économique et administrative précédée d'une introduction sur l'organisation gouvernementale / Maurice Gaudefroy-Demombynes. Paris, Librairie orientaliste Paul Geuthner, (Haut-Commissariat de la République Française en Syrie et au Liban : Bibliothèque archéologique et historique, Vol III.)
- 1927: Masālik el abṣār fi ... / 1 / L'Afrique, moins l'Égypte / Abu-'l-ʿAbbās Aḥmad Ibn-Yaḥyā Šihāb-ad-Dīn Ibn-Faḍlallāh al-ʿUmarī. Paris.
- 1927: Masālik el abṣār fi mamālik el amṣār / Abu-'l-ʿAbbās Aḥmad Ibn-Yaḥyā Šihāb-ad-Dīn Ibn-Faḍlallāh al-ʿUmarī. Paris.
- 1949: Voyages. First edition, four volumes, Librairie orientaliste Geuthner, 1949, 1951, 1953–1956 and 1965 (Documents related to the history of the Crusades published by the Académie des Inscriptions et Belles-Lettres. Vol I–III, plus Atlas).
- 1965: Voyages / P. 4 / Tables / Muḥammad Ibn-Aḥmad Ibn-Ǧubair.
- 1953–1956: Voyages; P. 3 / Muḥammad Ibn-Aḥmad Ibn-Ǧubair.
- 1951: Voyages; P. 2 / Muḥammad Ibn-Aḥmad Ibn-Ǧubair.
- 1949: Voyages; P. 1 / Muḥammad Ibn-Aḥmad Ibn-Ǧubair.
- 1952: Grammaire de l'arabe classique: (morphologie et syntaxe) / Régis Blachère. - 3e éd., reworked (reprint): Maisonneuve et Larose
- undated: Les cent et une nuits. Translated from Arabic. Librairie orientale et américaine E. Guilmoto, Translated with extensive notes from a modern North African manuscript with variants from three others.
- 1927: Masālik El Abṣār fi ... / 1 / L'Afrique, moins l'Égypte / Abu-'l-ʿAbbās Aḥmad Ibn-Yaḥyā Šihāb-ad-Dīn Ibn-Faḍlallāh al-ʿUmarī.
- 1907: Documents sur les langues de l'Oubangui-Chari. Includes (p. 107–122) a comparative list of 200 words from Bua, Niellim, Fanian and Tunia languages, with a short grammar and a few sentences collected by Decorse.

== Bibliography ==
- George Cœdès, Notice sur la vie et les travaux de M. Maurice Gaudefroy-Demombynes, membre de l’Académie. In: Comptes-rendus des séances de l’Académie des Inscriptions et Belles-Lettres. Jg. 103 (1959), n°1, (p. 46–60) (Read online).

== See also ==
- Mimi of Gaudefroy-Demombynes, an extinct language of Chad
