= Mimi of Decorse =

Extinct language of Chad

- Mimi-D; Mimi of Gaudefroy-Demombynes
- Native to: Chad
- Era: attested c. 1900
- Language family: Unclassified language (Central Sudanic?)

Language codes
- ISO 639-3: None (mis)
- Glottolog: mimi1240

Mimi of Decorse, also known as Mimi of Gaudefroy-Demombynes and Mimi-D, is a language of Chad that is attested only in a word list labelled "Mimi" that was collected c. 1900 by G. J. Decorse and published by Maurice Gaudefroy-Demombynes. Joseph Greenberg (1960) classified it as a Maban language, like the rather remote Maban relative Mimi of Nachtigal. However, George Starostin (2011) rejects this classification, arguing that similarities to Maban are due to contact with locally dominant Maba (the similarities are with that language specifically, not with the entire Maban family), and provisionally regards it as a language isolate, though it is suggestive of Central Sudanic.

== Basic vocabulary ==
The more stable of Mimi-D and Mimi-N's attested vocabulary is as follows:

gloss	Mimi-D	Mimi-N
two	mel	søn
eye	dyo	kal
fire	sou	
stone	muguru	
hand	sil	rai
what	ɲeta	
die	dafaya	
drink	andʒi	ab
dog		ɲuk
moon	aɾ	
claw/nail	fer	
blood		ari
one	deg	ul-un
tooth	ɲain	ziːk
eat	ɲyam	
hair	suf (Arabic?)	fuːl
water	engi	sun (Fur?)
nose	fir	hur
mouth	ɲyo	mil
ear	feɾ	kuyi
bird		kabal-a
bone		kadʒi
sun	sey	
tree	su	
kill	kuduma	
foot	rep	zaŋ
horn	kamin	
meat	ɲyu	neŋ
egg	dʒulut	
black	liwuk	
head	bo	kidʒ-i
night	lem	
fish	gonas	
see	yakoe	

== See also ==
- Mimi of Nachtigal
- Mimi of Decorse word list (Wiktionary)
