= Y-DNA haplogroups in Kazakh tribes =

The frequency of Y haplogroups in percent among Kazakh tribes.

haplogroup	Marker	Kazakhs	Senior zhuz			Middle zhuz						Junior zhuz			Tore	Khoja
	tribes		Uysun	Zhalayir	Qangly	Argyn	Kerey	Konyrat	Kipchak	Naiman	Uaq	Alimuly	Baiuly	Zhetyru		
	numbers	N=1982	N=248	N=103	N=27	N=384	N=102	N=90	N=133	N=336	N=45	N=145	N=130	N=55	N=28	N=107
D*	M174	1	0	0	0	0	0	0	0	1	0	0	0	0	0	7
D1b	P37.1	0	0	0	0	0	0	0	0	0	0	0	0	0	0	0
E1b1b1*	M35	0	0	4	0	0	0	0	0	0	0	0	0	2	0	1
E1b1b1a1	M78	0	1	1	0	0	1	0	0	0	0	0	2	0	0	0
E1b1b1b2a1	M123	0	0	0	0	0	0	0	0	0	0	0	0	0	0	0
C2*	M217	17	50	38	7	3	66	2	2	10	2	2	13	25	36	7
C2b1a2	M48	19	11	2	0	5	9	1	2	27	7	77	69	27	4	3
C2c1a1a1	M407	4	1	1	0	1	0	86	0	1	4	0	0	2	0	0
G1	M285	15	3	0	7	67	4	0	5	1	4	0	0	2	4	7
G2a*	P15	0	0	4	0	0	0	0	0	0	0	0	0	0	0	0
G2a2b2a	P303	1	0	0	0	1	0	0	1	0	4	2	0	2	0	0
G2b1	M377	0	0	0	0	0	0	0	0	0	0	1	0	0	0	0
H1	M69	0	0	1	0	0	0	0	0	0	0	0	0	0	0	0
I*	M170	0	0	0	0	0	0	0	0	1	0	0	0	0	0	1
I1	M253	1	1	1	0	0	0	0	1	2	2	0	0	0	0	0
I2a1	P37.2	0	0	0	0	0	0	0	0	0	0	0	1	0	0	0
J1*	M267	3	12	0	4	2	4	1	0	0	4	1	2	0	7	0
J1a2a1a2	P58	0	0	0	0	1	1	0	0	0	0	0	0	0	0	0
J2*	M172	5	8	3	7	3	2	0	22	1	0	1	2	13	0	10
J2a1a	M47	0	0	0	0	0	0	0	0	0	0	0	0	0	0	1
J2a1b*	M67	0	0	1	0	0	0	0	0	0	0	0	2	0	0	0
J2a1b1	M92	0	0	0	7	0	0	0	0	0	0	0	0	0	0	0
J2b	M12	0	0	0	0	0	0	0	0	0	0	0	0	0	0	1
N*	M231	1	0	0	0	1	1	0	0	3	0	0	0	2	0	1
N1a1a	M178	5	4	22	0	2	0	3	1	2	64	1	3	7	0	1
N1a2a	M128	0	1	0	0	0	0	0	0	0	0	0	1	0	0	2
N1a2b	P43	1	0	1	0	0	0	0	0	2	0	1	0	2	0	2
O1b	P31	0	0	0	0	1	0	0	0	0	0	0	0	0	0	0
O2*	M122	0	1	1	0	0	0	0	0	0	0	1	0	0	0	3
O2a2*	P201	0	0	1	0	0	0	0	0	2	0	0	0	0	0	0
O2a2b1	M134	8	0	5	0	1	0	0	1	42	2	1	1	5	4	0
Q*	M242	2	0	6	48	2	3	0	1	0	0	6	2	2	4	0
Q1a1a	M120	0	0	0	0	0	0	0	0	0	0	0	0	0	0	0
Q1a2	M143	0	0	0	0	0	0	0	5	0	0	0	0	0	0	1
Q2a1	M378	0	0	0	0	0	0	0	0	0	0	0	0	0	0	2
R1a1a*	M198	6	4	8	4	6	7	4	8	2	2	3	3	2	18	32
R1a1a1b1a1	M458	1	1	0	0	1	0	0	0	0	2	0	0	0	0	3
R1b*	M343	0	0	0	0	0	0	0	0	0	0	0	0	0	0	0
R1b1a1a*	P297	4	0	0	4	1	0	1	47	1	0	1	0	4	0	0
R1b1a1a2	M269	2	0	0	7	1	2	1	5	2	0	1	0	4	0	2
R2a	M124	1	0	1	0	1	1	0	0	0	0	1	0	0	25	10
L1a1	М27	0	0	0	0	0	0	0	0	0	0	1	0	0	0	0
L1a2	M357	0	0	0	0	0	0	0	1	0	0	0	0	0	0	4
L1b	M317	0	0	0	4	0	0	0	0	0	0	1	0	0	0	0
T1a	M70	0	0	0	0	0	0	0	0	0	0	0	0	0	0	1
Diversity (GD)		0,89	0,72	0,80	0,76	0,54	0,56	0,27	0,72	0,74	0,58	0,40	0,50	0,85	0,80	0,87

== Haplogroups of the tribes of the Senior zhuz ==
Senior Zhuz is formed by a combination of not only genetically related tribal groups, but also genetically remote.

Y haplogroups of the tribes of the Senior zhuz in percentage.

No.	haplogroup	Senior zhuz	Zhalair	Dulat	Alban	Suan	Saryuisun	Oshaqty	Shaprashty	Shanyshkyly	Shaksham	Qangly	Sirgeli	Ysty
1	C3(x)	2,1	1,1	3,1	2,2	0,0	0,0	0,0	6,7	0,0	0,0	7,5	0,0	0,0
2	C3-M401	45,0	41,3	62,3	65,2	61,0	87,5	36,7	46,7	53,8	100,0	5,0	15,6	3,5
3	C3-M407	0,2	0,0	0,0	2,2	0,0	0,0	0,0	0,0	0,0	0,0	0,0	0,0	0,0
4	C3c-M86	5,3	4,3	8,9	8,7	0,0	0,0	0,0	6,7	15,4	0,0	2,5	0,0	1,8
5	E1b-M35	0,7	1,1	0,5	0,0	0,0	0,0	3,3	0,0	0,0	0,0	0,0	3,1	0,0
6	G(x)	0,2	0,0	0,0	2,2	0,0	0,0	0,0	0,0	0,0	0,0	0,0	0,0	0,0
7	G1-M285	2,3	5,4	1,0	2,2	0,0	0,0	10,0	0,0	0,0	0,0	2,5	0,0	1,8
8	G2-P287	1,6	6,5	0,0	0,0	0,0	0,0	0,0	6,7	0,0	0,0	2,5	0,0	1,8
9	I1-M253•	0,4	0,0	0,0	0,0	0,0	0,0	0,0	0,0	0,0	0,0	0,0	0,0	3,5
10	I2a-L460•	1,2	2,2	1,0	0,0	0,0	0,0	6,7	6,7	0,0	0,0	0,0	0,0	0,0
11	I2b-L415•	0,7	0,0	2,1	0,0	0,0	0,0	0,0	0,0	0,0	0,0	0,0	0,0	0,0
12	J(x)	0,7	0,0	0,5	0,0	0,0	0,0	0,0	0,0	15,4	0,0	2,5	0,0	0,0
13	J1-M267•	7,9	3,3	1,6	0,0	0,0	12,5	0,0	13,3	0,0	0,0	0,0	0,0	63,2
14	J2a-M410•	5,6	14,1	7,9	0,0	0,0	0,0	0,0	6,7	0,0	0,0	2,5	3,1	1,8
15	L•	0,4	0,0	0,0	0,0	4,9	0,0	0,0	0,0	0,0	0,0	0,0	0,0	0,0
16	N(x)	0,2	1,1	0,0	0,0	0,0	0,0	0,0	0,0	0,0	0,0	0,0	0,0	0,0
17	N-P43	0,4	0,0	0,5	0,0	0,0	0,0	0,0	6,7	0,0	0,0	0,0	0,0	0,0
18	N-M46	6,3	9,8	1,0	4,3	0,0	0,0	0,0	0,0	0,0	0,0	0,0	65,6	3,5
19	O(xM122)	1,1	0,0	0,5	0,0	0,0	0,0	0,0	0,0	0,0	0,0	0,0	0,0	8,8
20	O-M122(xM134)	0,2	0,0	0,0	0,0	0,0	0,0	0,0	0,0	0,0	0,0	0,0	3,1	0,0
21	O-M134	1,1	1,1	1,0	2,2	2,4	0,0	0,0	0,0	0,0	0,0	0,0	3,1	0,0
22	Q	5,3	0,0	0,5	2,2	0,0	0,0	0,0	0,0	0,0	0,0	67,5	3,1	0,0
23	R(x)	0,4	0,0	0,5	0,0	0,0	0,0	0,0	0,0	0,0	0,0	2,5	0,0	0,0
24	R1a1a-M198	6,5	3,3	3,7	6,5	31,7	0,0	26,7	0,0	7,7	0,0	5,0	0,0	0,0
25	R1b-M478	2,1	0,0	2,1	0,0	0,0	0,0	6,7	0,0	0,0	0,0	0,0	0,0	10,5
26	R1b-M269	0,5	0,0	0,0	2,2	0,0	0,0	3,3	0,0	0,0	0,0	0,0	3,1	0,0
27	R2-M124*	1,4	5,4	0,5	0,0	0,0	0,0	3,3	0,0	7,7	0,0	0,0	0,0	0,0
28	undefined	0,4	0,0	0,5	0,0	0,0	0,0	3,3	0,0	0,0	0,0	0,0	0,0	0,0
	number of probants	567	92	191	46	41	8	30	15	13	2	40	32	57
	Genetic diversity	0.773 ±0,017	0.793 ±0,036	0.597 ±0,041	0.570 ±0,085	0.538 ±0,059	0.250 ±0,18	0.798 ±0,052	0.791 ±0,105	0.705 ±0,122	0	0.544 ±0,094	0.557 ±0,097	0.588 ±0,073

== Western/European Kazakhs ==
A study analyzing the haplogroups of Western Kazakhs, in the European part of Kazakhstan, found that the majority (2/3) of Kazakh samples belong to the paternal haplogroup C2a1a2-M48, which, according to the authors, supports the traditional genealogy claims that the Alimuly and Baiuly clans descent from Emir Alau (and his paternal relatives).
