= Amdang people =

Ethnic group in Chad and Sudan

Amdang / Mimi
Total population
- 250,500

Regions with significant populations
- West Darfur and Wadi Fira
- Sudan: 8,000 in 1984

Languages
- Amdang, French, Arabic

Religion
- Sunni Islam

Related ethnic groups
- Fur

The Amdang are an ethnic group of Chad and Sudan who speak the Amdang language. Amdang belong to the Fur and are a Subgroup of Mimi people. Most Amdang are Muslims.
