= Karanga =

Karanga may refer to:

- Karanga people, a Shona sub-group in Zimbabwe
- Karanga dialect, a Shona language
- Karanga (district), Mangaia, Cook Islands
- Karanga (Māori culture), an element of Māori cultural protocol, the calling of visitors onto a marae
- Karanga (Moshi Urban Ward), Old Moshi, Kilimanjaro Region, Tanzania
- Karanga Chhota (village), a village in India
- Karanga language (Chad), a Nilo-Saharan language spoken in Chad
