= Mimi of Nachtigal =

Language of Chad

- Mimi-N
- Native to: Chad
- Era: attested c. 1870
- Language family: Nilo-Saharan?: Maban; Mimi of Nachtigal

Language codes
- ISO 639-3: None (mis)
- Glottolog: mimi1241
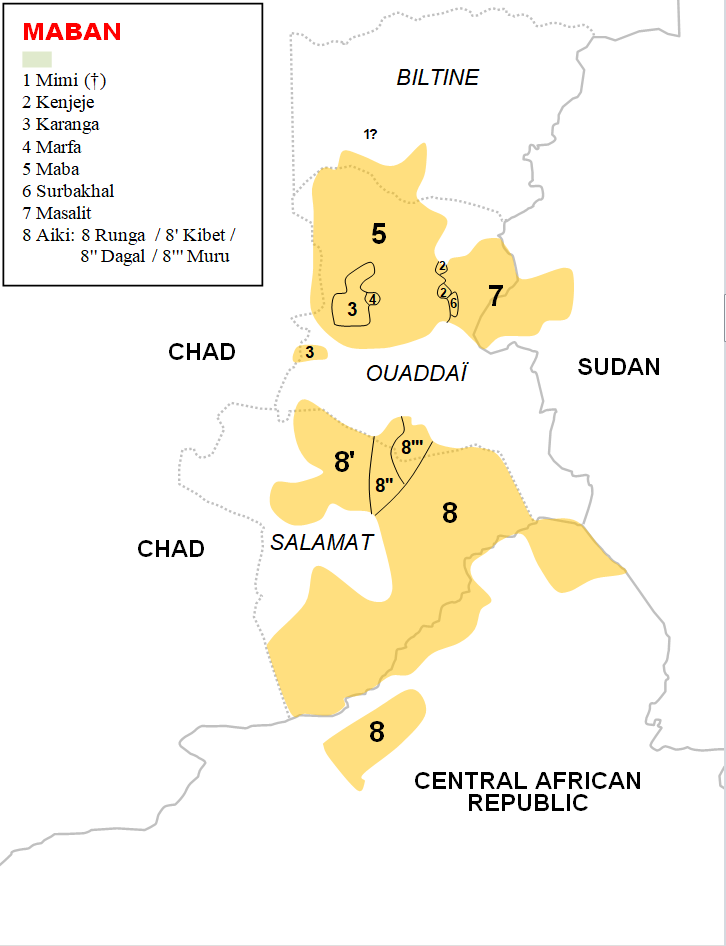
- Map of Maban languages. Mimi-N is labeled 1.

Mimi of Nachtigal, or Mimi-N, is a language of Chad that is attested only in a word list labelled "Mimi" that was collected c. 1870 by Gustav Nachtigal. Nachtigal's data was subsequently published by Lukas & Voelckers (1938).

== Classification ==
Joseph Greenberg (1960) classified it as a Maban language, though a distant one. Subsequent researchers have supported a remote relationship, though there is little data to go on.

== Basic vocabulary ==
The more stable of Mimi-N and Mimi-D's attested vocabulary is as follows:

gloss	Mimi-N	Mimi-D
two	søn	mel
eye	kal	dyo
fire		sou
stone		muguru
hand	rai	sil
what		ɲeta
die		dafaya
drink	ab	andʒi
dog	ɲuk	
moon		aɾ
claw/nail		fer
blood	ari	
one	ul-un	deg
tooth	ziːk	ɲain
eat		ɲyam
hair	fuːl	suf (Arabic?)
water	sun (Fur?)	engi
nose	hur	fir
mouth	mil	ɲyo
ear	kuyi	feɾ
bird	kabal-a	
bone	kadʒi	
sun		sey
tree		su
kill		kuduma
foot	zaŋ	rep
horn		kamin
meat	neŋ	ɲyu
egg		dʒulut
black		liwuk
head	kidʒ-i	bo
night		lem
fish		gonas
see		yakoe

== See also ==
- Mimi of Decorse
- Mimi of Nachtigal word list (Wiktionary)
