= Masalit language =

Maban language in Chad and Sudan

Masalit
- Kanaa Masarak
- Native to: Chad, Sudan
- Region: Ouaddaï, Sila (Chad), West Darfur, South Darfur (Sudan)
- Ethnicity: Masalit
- Native speakers: 980,000 (2022–2024)
- Language family: Nilo-Saharan?: Maban; Masalit languages; Masalit
- Writing system: Latin

Language codes
- ISO 639-3: Either: mls – Masalit mdg – Massalat
- Glottolog: nucl1440 Nuclear Masalit mass1262 Massalat
- ELP: Massalat

Linguistic map of the non-Arab peoples of Darfur, showing the extent of the Masalit language in Sudan.

Masalit (autonym Masala/Masara; Arabic: ماساليت) is a Nilo-Saharan language of the Maban language group spoken by the Masalit people in Ouaddaï Region, Chad and West Darfur, Sudan.

Masalit, known as the Massalat, moved west into central-eastern Chad. Their ethnic population in Chad was 30,000 as of the 1993 census, but only 10 speakers of their language were reported in 1991.

== Phonology ==
=== Vowels ===
	Front	Central	Back
Close	i	ɨ	u
Close-mid	e	ə	o
Open-mid	ɛ	ʌ	ɔ
Open		a	

=== Consonants ===
		Labial	Dental/ Alveolar	Palatal	Velar	Glottal
Nasal		m	n	ɲ	ŋ	
Stop/ Affricate	voiceless	p	t	t͡ʃ	k	
Stop/ Affricate	voiced	b	d	d͡ʒ	g	
Stop/ Affricate	prenasal	ᵐb	ⁿd	ⁿd͡ʒ	ᵑɡ	
Fricative	voiceless	f	s	ʃ	(x)	h
Fricative	voiced	v	(z)			
Trill			r			
Lateral			l			
Approximant	labial			ɥ	w	
Approximant	central			j		

- It has been stated that occasional click sounds [ǀ] and [ǃ] may occur, however; they are considered to be rare.
- Sounds /r, l, m, k/ can occur as geminated [rː, lː, mː, kː].
- Sounds /t, m, n, ŋ/ can occur as palatalized [tʲ, mʲ, nʲ, ŋʲ] before front vowels.
- /z, x/ only occur as a result of words of Arabic origin.
- [ʔ] is not a phonemic sound, and is only heard before word-initial vowels.
- Sounds /p, ɥ, v/ only occur in word-initial position.

== Sociolects ==
The Masalit language has two sociolects:

- "Heavy" Masalit, spoken by higher-ranking people and those in the countryside, with a complicated agglutinative grammar
- "Light" Masalit, spoken particularly in the home and in the market, with a somewhat simplified grammatical structure and many borrowings from Sudanese Arabic, the regional lingua franca and language of education.
