= Fur people =

Ethnic group in Sudan and Chad

Fur
Total population
- about 502,000 in 1983, about 744,000 in 2004, about 1,100,000 as of 2017

Regions with significant populations
- Sudan 894,000, Chad 17,000, Central African Republic 14,500, Egypt 4,200

Languages
- Native; Fur; Also; Arabic • French

Religion
- Sunni Islam

Related ethnic groups
- Amdang, Masalit, Tunjur, Zaghawa, Nilo-Saharans

The Fur (Fur: fòòrà, Arabic: فور Fūr) are an ethnic group mainly inhabiting Darfur in the western Sudan, where they are the largest ethnic group. They speak the Fur language, which belongs to the Nilo-Saharan family. Darfur means home of the Fur. They are Muslim cattle herders and farmers, and have been displaced and attacked in ethnic conflicts.

== Overview ==
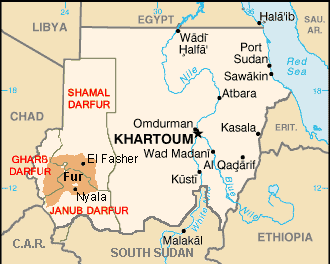
The Fur's traditional territory

Linguistic map of the non-Arab peoples of Darfur, showing the extent of the Fur language.

The Fur are the largest ethnic group in the Darfur region of western Sudan. They are also sometimes referred to by the names Fora, Fordunga, Furawi, Konjara, or Kungara. They are an active agricultural people and may also herd cattle. Some Fur families who have accumulated a substantial cattle herd developed a more nomadic lifestyle like that of their herding neighbors, the Baqqara (Baggara) Arabs. Culturally, those cattle-herding Fur are now considered to be Baqqara. The Fur are nominally Sunni Muslims following the Maliki school of Islamic law.

They are a Western Sudanese people who practice sedentary herding and agriculture, mainly the cultivation of millet. Their society is a traditional one governed by village elders. They speak Fur, a Nilo-Saharan language, and are Muslims, having adopted the religion following the region's conquest by the Kanem-Bornu Empire during the Middle Ages. Some of them have come to speak Arabic in recent years.

The name of Darfur comes from the name of this ethnic group and means "the home of the Fur". Most of the well known governors of Darfur such as Deriage and Tegani Seisei are members of the Fur. The Fur established the historical Sultanate of Darfur which governed Darfur until 1916 (see History of Darfur).

Abdul Wahid al Nur, a leader among the Fur, established the Sudan Liberation Movement and Army. Another leader of the Fur, as of 2007, is Ahmed Abdelshafi (Toba).

The traditional heartland of the Fur is the mountainous region around Jebel Sî and Jebel Marra Wadi Salih and Zaligi; today, however, most of them live in the lower country west and southwest of that area, between 11–14 N and 23–26 E. Some Fur live across the border in Chad, many of them refugees.

The Furs' lifestyle has led to conflict with the nomadic Baggara, cattle-herders of the region, concerning access to water and grazing land, particularly in Darfur's central Jebel Marra mountains where the best agricultural land is to be found. This has been the source of ethnic tensions for many years, culminating in the Darfur conflict which began in 2003.

Many Fur villagers were massacred in the ethnic fighting as Mahria and Terjem tribes divided up land they conquered from the Fur, according to a 3 September 2007 New York Times account citing United Nations officials and Fur survivors.

== Language ==
The Fur speak the Fur language, which belongs to the Nilo-Saharan family. Arabic is also used as a lingua franca and in correspondence with the Sudanese government. There is no written or symbolic script for the Fur language. They recently have been using Arabic or Latin characters to put the language in written form. Most Fur people speak Fur fluently as their mother tongue.

== Art ==
=== Handmade art ===
Fur people make their own handmade art and utensils including talak, used for cleaning pots (talak looks like a sponge); birish, a carpet for sitting; and gada, a wood plate or bowl used for important occasions.

=== Music, stories and entertainment ===
Among the Fur people, stories are told to keep children safe from the outside world. These stories are designed to keep children close to home. In some stories children are told that if they go out in the morning they will die from the heat of the sun, and in the night they are told if they go out an animal called nyama will eat them.

Fur music is very popular in their culture. The main instruments are drums. The music is played with a heavy drumbeat that accompanies their celebrations. Some popular Fur musicians are; Abdalla Kioka, Marium Amo and Tour Baréé'ng Kwee.

=== Architecture ===
A common type of architecture in homes and buildings is called mud architecture. They dig the clay from the ground, break it up, mix it with water, work thoroughly, and also mix other substances like straw. The clay will then pile up while still wet, pressed on to the scaffolds made out of wood, or cast in molds of various sizes into bricks. When the mud dries up in the molded shape, the process is complete. This technique is applied to most architecture in Western Sudan such as farmhouses, barns, outer walls, palaces, and even mosques. Mud is good at absorbing heat, which is advantageous for cold nights. Because of its low resistance to wind and rain, there is a need for frequent repairs. Mud architecture is fragile and being used less as cultural changes and foreign influences bring change.

== Social behavior ==
=== Roles of men and women ===
The men bear the family name. They work to bring money to the family and are responsible for all important decisions related to the family, such as finances and marriages. The women get water, prepare the food and ensure the cleanliness of the home.

=== Food ===
Millet is used to make asida. Parts of the Balanites aegyptiaca including leaves and fruit are prepared as food. Rats and animals bones are part of the diet of the Fur.

Sudan's Guhwah coffee is served from a jebena, a special Sudanese pot. The coffee beans are roasted in this pot over charcoal, then ground with cloves and other spices. The grounds are steeped in hot water and the coffee is served in tiny cups after straining it through a grass sieve.

Tea is also very popular and served in small glasses without milk. Some beverages enjoyed in the non-Islamic areas are Aragi, a clear, strong spirit made from dates; Merissa, a type of beer; and Tedj, a wine prepared from dates or honey.

Millet porridge and fool medamas, a savory dish of mashed fava beans, are popular breakfast foods in the north. Lamb and chicken are often eaten, but pork is prohibited to Muslims.

Wheat and dura sorghum are the staple starches. Breads include the Arabian khubz and kisra, an omelet-like pancake which is part of the Sudanese dinner. Maschi, a beef and tomato dish, is also typical. Fruits are peeled for dessert and a favorite treat is creme caramel.

In the south, dinner is served on a low, bare table. There may be five or six dishes to dip into with large pieces of flatbread. These dishes are accompanied by a salad and shata, a red-hot spice mixture served in small dishes. After the meal, dessert is served, then tea. On special occasions incense may be lit. The ritual of hospitality is important in Sudan.

== Economic base ==
The Fur people have many types of families. Porundia, nuclear families, are a very common type. They normally have 2 or more children. In a typical Fur family the parents of the groom and wife will be taken care of until they die.

In a Fur marriage, the groom's father goes to the bride's father and asks for his son's permission to marry. The bride's father does not give an answer immediately, but then asks the village for its opinion. If everyone approves, the bride's father accepts. The whole village gathers for the announcement of the marriage, and preparations are made. Then the marriage starts in the groom's house. The Imam recites words from the Quran. The groom and bride hold hands during this time. After the wedding, the family and guests have lunch, then they start a lively dance called firalubia. Then the bride and groom are taken to the bride's house and given food during which everyone says congratulations (mabrouk in Arabic).

== History ==
The Fur people came from Central Africa, specifically the Central African Republic and Chad to the northwest of Sudan, where they settled in Darfur. They had 36 sultanates. The Fur were also one of the first people from other ethnic groups in the country who were picked to build the wall covering and mosque surrounding the Kaaba. Moreover, they managed to send conveys informs of aid every year to Makkah.

=== Political situation ===
Until 1916, the Fur were ruled by an independent sultanate and were oriented politically to peoples in Chad. Though the ruling dynasty before that time, as well as the common people, had long been Muslims, they have not been Arabized. They are now incorporated into the Sudanese political system. The Fur had been basically independent from the 17th century. After British reconquest in 1899, the British approved the re-establishment of the Fur Sultanate, assumed by Ali Dinar when the Mahdist movement crumbled.

Mahdist revolts continued to break out in Sudan until 1916. The fall of Darfur was decided when Ali Dinar declared loyalty to the Ottoman Empire in World War I. The British abolished the Fur Sultanate in 1916 after Dinar died in battle.

During World War I, Darfur made a bid for independence by allying with Turkey against the British. The British conquered Darfur in 1916, and since then it has been part of Sudan. Since the 1970s, the Darfur area has suffered some of the effects of the northern Arab war prosecuted in the south against Southern ethnic groups who wanted to secede from Sudan.

War and conflict have ravaged the Darfur region in recent decades. A civil war lasted about 20 years until the end of the 20th Century. Conflict in the region arose again in 2003, deriving from earlier disputes surrounding water and land use between the Fur and other sedentary agricultural populations and Arab nomadic groups who had historically inhabited the region. The Sudanese military, in alliance with a proxy Arab nomadic militia known as the Janjaweed, orchestrated a concerted, scorched earth campaign in Darfur against the Fur and other historically sedentary groups. Forces would move from village to village, burning nearly everything in many places and carrying out a campaign of mass sexual violence against civilians, including children. This resulted in the deaths of upwards of 200,000 to 300,000 civilians from 2003-2005. The Darfur region has remained a bastion for forces of the RSF, an outgrowth of earlier Janjaweed militias, amid the ongoing Sudanese Civil War, with violence against Fur inhabitants and other targeted and displaced groups increasing at a rapid, concentrated pace. Many human rights observers have described the RSF's campaign in the region and in its siege of the North Darfurian capital of Al-Fashir, as constituting crimes against humanity, and, at its greatest extremes, genocide.

== Genetics ==
Analysis of classic genetic markers and DNA polymorphisms by Tay and Saha (1988) found that the Fur are most closely related to the Hawazma of Sudan. Both populations have gene frequencies intermediate between those of the Afro-Asiatic-speaking Beja, Gaalin and Gulf Arab populations and those of the local Nilo-Saharan-speaking Nuba and Nilotes.

According to Hassan et al. (2008), around 59.4% of Fur are carriers of the E1b1b paternal haplogroup. Of these, 68.4% bear the V32 subclade. Approximately 6.3% also belong to the haplogroup J1. This points to significant patrilineal gene flow from neighboring Afro-Asiatic-speaking populations. The remaining Fur individuals are primarily carriers of the A3b2 lineage (31.3%), which is instead common among Nilotes.

Maternally, the Fur entirely belong to African-based derivatives of the macrohaplogroup L according to Hassan (2010). Of these mtDNA clades, the L0a1 (15.3%) and L1c (11.5%) lineages are most frequent. This altogether suggests that the genetic introgression into the Fur's ancestral population was asymmetrical, occurring primarily through Afro-Asiatic-speaking males rather than females.
