= Fur language =

Nilo-Saharan language spoken in Sudan and Chad

Furs
- Foor’íŋ belé’ŋ
- Native to: Sudan, Chad
- Region: Darfur, Sila
- Ethnicity: Fur
- Native speakers: 790,000 (2004–2023)
- Language family: Nilo-Saharan?: Fur; Furs
- Writing system: Latin

Language codes
- ISO 639-3: fvr
- Glottolog: furr1244
- Linguasphere: 05-CAA-aa
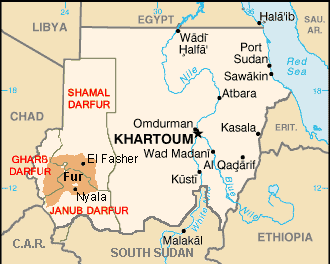
- Geographic distribution of Fur

Linguistic map of the non-Arab peoples of Darfur, showing the extent of the Fur language in Sudan.

The Fur language or For; (Fur: Foor’íŋ belé’ŋ) is a Nilo-Saharan language spoken by the Fur of Darfur in Western Sudan and Chad. It is part of a broader family of languages known as the Fur languages.

== Phonology ==
The consonantal phonemes are:

	Labial	Alveolar	Palatal	Velar	Labiovelar	Glottal
Plosive	p (Note: /f/ is in free variation among a series of sounds ranging between [p] and [f]; thus some sources give the name of the language as pɔɔr.) b	t d	ɟ (Note: /ɟ/ can also be pronounced as [dʒ].)	k ɡ		
Fricative	f	s (z) (Note: [z] occurs only as an allophone of /j/.)				h (Note: /h/ is very rare.)
Nasal	m	n	ɲ	ŋ		
Approximant		l	j		w	
Trill		r				

The vowels are: a e i o u. There is dispute whether the –ATR vowels [ɛ], [ɔ], [ɪ], [ʊ] are phonetic variants or separate phonemes.

		Front	Central	Back
Close	[+ATR]	i		u
Near-close	[-ATR]	ɪ		ʊ
Mid	[+ATR]	[e]	ə	[o]
Open-mid	[-ATR]	ɛ		ɔ
Open	[-ATR]		a	

There are two underlying tonemes, L (low) and H (high); phonetically, L, H, mid, HL, and LH are all found.

Metathesis is an extremely common and regular grammatical phenomenon in Fur: when a consonant pronoun prefix is prefixed to a verb that begins with a consonant, either the verb's first consonant is deleted or it changes places with the following vowel; e.g.:

lem- → -elm-
"lick" {} {}

ba- → -ab-
"drink" {} {}

tuum- → -utum-
"build" {} {}

There are also various assimilation rules.

== Writing ==
Fur is written in the Latin alphabet with the addition of the letters a̱ (a with macron below), ɨ, ŋ, and ʉ, and the digraph ny.

High tone is marked by the acute accent, falling tone is marked by circumflex, rising tone is marked by caron ("wedge"), and low tone is unmarked.

== Morphology ==
=== Plurals ===
Noun, and optionally adjective, plurals can be formed with -a (-ŋa after vowels):

aldí → aldíŋá
"story" {} "stories"

pira → piraŋa
{"(a certain species of) antelope"} {} "antelopes"

báin → báiná
"old" {} {"old (PL)"}

This suffix also gives the inanimate 3rd person plural of the verb:

liíŋ → liíŋá, káliŋa
{"he bathes"} {} {"they (inanimate) bathe"} {"they (animate) bathe"}

Vowel-final adjectives can take a plural in -lá, as well as -ŋa:

lúllá → {lúllála or lúlláŋa}
"cold" {} {"cold (PL)"}

A similar suffix (metathesized and assimilated to become -ól/-úl/-ál) is used for the plural of the verb in some tenses.

A few CVV nouns take the plural suffix H-ta;

roo → {roota'wala gal rooŋa}
"river" {} "rivers"

{ra̱yi' wala gal ra̱y} → {rǎ̱ytó'wala gal rǎ̱ytá}
"field" {} "fields"

At least two nouns take the suffix -i:

kóór → kóórí
"spear" {} "spears"

dʉ́tʉ → kʉ́ʉ́tɨ́
"mouse" {} "mice"

Nouns with the singular prefix d- (> n- before a nasal) take the plural k-; these are about 20% of all nouns. In some cases (mostly body parts) it is accompanied by L; e.g.:

dɨ́ló → kɨ́ló
"ear" {} "ears"

nʉ́ŋɨ́ → kʉ́ŋɨ́
"eye" {} "eyes"

dági → kagi
"tooth" {} "teeth"

dormí → kormi
"nose" {} "noses"

- In some cases, the singular also has a suffix -ŋ, not found in the plural:

daulaŋ → kaula
"shoe" {} "shoes"

dɨróŋ → kɨro
"egg" {} "eggs"

- Sometimes, a further plural suffix from those listed above is added:

nʉ́nʉm → kʉ́nʉ́ma
"granary" {} "granaries"

nʉ́ʉ́m → kʉ́ʉ́mɨ́
"snake" {} "snakes"

dɨwwô → {kɨwwóla'wala gal 'kɨwwóŋa}
"new" {} {"new (PL)"}

- Sometimes the suffix -(n)ta, is added:

dewer → kewértá
"porcupine" {} "porcupines"

da̱wi → {ka̱wíntó'wala gal ka̱wíntá}
"tail" {} "tails"

- One noun, as well as the demonstratives and the interrogative "which", take a plural by simply prefixing k-L:

úú → kuu
"cow" {} "cows"

á̱yɨ → ká̱yɨ
{"which (one)?"} {} {"which (ones)?"}

- Several syntactic plurals with no singulars, mostly denoting liquids, have k-L-a; kewa "blood", koro "water", kona "name, song" koonà.

=== Nouns ===
The locative case can be expressed by the suffix -le or by reversing the noun's final tone, e.g.:

tòŋ → toŋ
"house" {} {"at the house"}

loo + kàrrà → {loo kàrrà-le}
"place" {} "far" {} {"at a far place"}

The genitive (English possessive s) is expressed by the suffix -iŋ (the i is deleted after a vowel.) If the relationship is possessive, the possessor comes first; otherwise, it comes last; e.g.:

nuum → {nuumiŋ tàbù}
"snake" {} {"snake's head"}

jùtà → {kàrabà jùtăŋ}
"forest" {} {"animals of the forest"}

=== Pronouns ===
Independent subject:

Singular	Fur	Plural	Fur
I	ká	we	kɨ́
you (sg.)	jɨ́	you (pl.)	bɨ́
he, she, it	yé	they	yɨeŋ + yeeŋ

The object pronouns are identical, apart from being low tone and having -ŋó added to the plural forms.

Prefixed subject pronouns:

Singular	Fur	Plural	Fur
I	– (triggers metathesis)	we	k-
you (sg.)	j-	you (pl.)	b-
he, she, it	– (causes raising; *y-)	they (animate)	y- (+pl. suffix)
		they (inanimate)	(*y-) (+pl. suffix)

Thus, for example, on the verb bʉo- "tire":

English	Fur	English	Fur
I'm tired	ká ʉmo	we tired	kɨ́ kʉmo
you (sg.) tired	jɨ́ jʉmo	you (pl.) tired	bɨ́ bʉmo
he/it/she tired	yé bʉo	they tired	yɨeŋ kʉme + yeeŋ bʉe

gi, described as the "participant object pronoun", represents first or second person objects in a dialogue, depending on context.

Possessives (singular; take k- with plural nouns):

Singular	Fur	Plural	Fur
my	dúíŋ	our	dáíŋ
your (sg.)	dɨ́ɨ́ŋ	your (pl.)	dɨ́eŋ
his, hers, its	dééŋ	their	dɨ́eŋ

=== Verbs ===
The Fur verbal system is quite complicated; verbs fall into a variety of conjugations. There are three tenses: present, perfect, and future. Subjunctive is also marked. Aspect is distinguished in the past tense.

Derivational suffixes include -iŋ (intransitive/reflexive; e.g.

lii → liiŋ
{"he washes"} {} {"he washes himself"}

and gemination of the middle consonant plus -à/ò (intensive; e.g.

jabi → jappiò/jabbiò
"drop" {} {"throw down"}

Negation is done with the marker a-...-bà surrounding the verb; a-bai-bà "he does not drink".

=== Adjectives ===
Most adjectives have two syllables, and a geminate middle consonant: e.g. àppa "big", fùkka "red", lecka "sweet". Some have three syllables: dàkkure "solid".

Adverbs can be derived from adjectives by addition of the suffix -ndì or L-n, e.g.:

kùlle → {kùllendì or kùllèn}
"fast" {} "quickly"

Abstract nouns can be derived from adjectives by adding -iŋ and lowering all tones, deleting any final vowel of the adjective, e.g.:

dìrro → dìrrìŋ
"heavy" {} "heaviness"

== Media in Fur language ==
Radio Dabanga broadcasts daily news in the Fur language and in other languages local to Darfur.

== Sources ==
- Beaton, A.C. (1968) [1937]. A Grammar of the Fur Language. Linguistic Monograph Series. Vol. 1. Khartoum: Sudan Research Unit, Faculty of Arts, University of Khartoum.
- Bariwarig Tooduo, "Participant Reference in the Fur language of the Sudan". University of Juba 2014
- Bariwarig Tooduo, "Number Marking in the Fur language of the Sudan"
- Bariwarig Tooduo, "Modifiers in the Fur language of the Sudan"
- Jakobi, Angelika (1989). A Fur Grammar. Hamburg: Buske.
- Kutsch-Lojenga, Constance; Waag, Christine (2004). Gilley, Leoma C. (ed.). The Sounds and Tones of Fur. Occasional Papers in the Study of Sudanese Languages. Vol. 9. Entebbe: SIL-Sudan.
- Noel, Georgianna (2008). An Examination of the Tone System of Fur and its Function in Grammar (MA thesis). University of Texas at Arlington. hdl:10106/1064.
- Bariwarig Tooduo. A paper on scientific and Biblical key-terms in the Fur Language of the Sudan 11 Oct 2016
