= Ouaddaï (region) =

Region of Chad

Coordinates: 13.83°N 20.8328°E

Ouaddaï وداي Waddāy
- Province
- Map of Chad showing Ouaddaï.
- Country: Chad
- Departments: 3
- Sub-prefectures: 16
- Regional capital: Abéché

Population (2009)
  - Total: 721,166
- Time zone: UTC+01:00 (WAT)

Ouaddaï or Wadai (Arabic: وداي, romanised: Waddāy) is a province of Chad, located in the south-east of the country, with its capital at Abéché. Prior to 2002 it was known as Ouaddaï Prefecture; in 2008 the southern portions of Ouaddaï (the Sila Department and Djourf Al Ahmar Department) were split off to become the new Sila Region (also known as Dar Sila).

== History ==
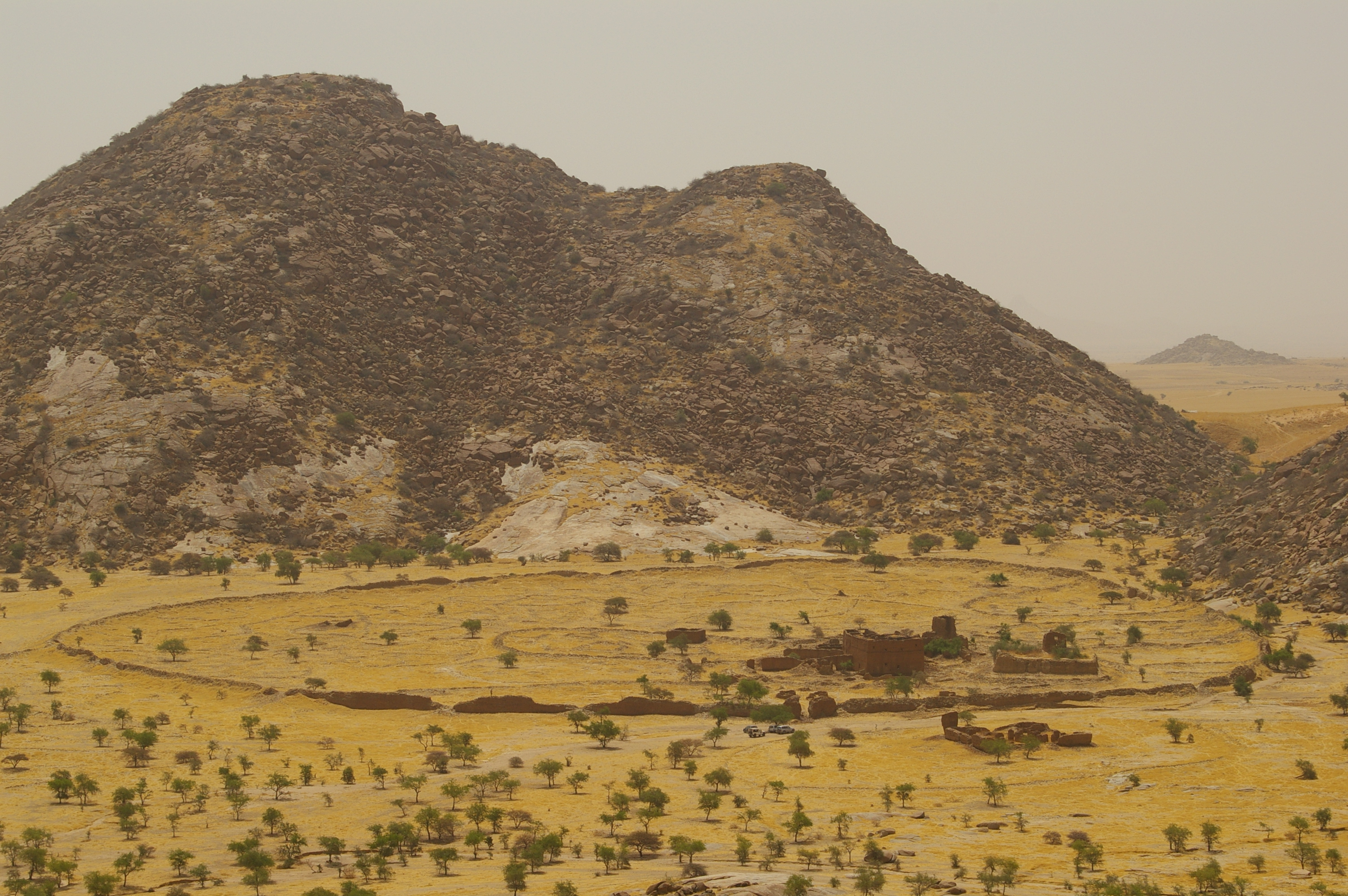
The ruins of Ouara

The region was the heartland of the former Ouaddai Empire, or Wadai Sultanate, which existed from the early 16th century until 1911 when it was conquered by France in the Ouaddai War. Both capitals of the Empire - Ouara (now uninhabited) and Abéché - are located in modern Ouaddaï region.

== Geography ==
The region borders Wadi Fira Region to the north, Sudan to the east, Sila Region to the south, and Batha Region to the west. The terrain is generally flat savannah, rising slightly towards the east where the Ouaddaï highlands are located.

=== Settlements ===
Abéché is the capital of the region and is the fourth largest city in Chad; other major settlements include Abdi, Adré, Am Hitan, Bourtail, Chokoyan, Hadjer Hadid, Marfa, Mabrone and Tourane.

== Demography ==
As per the 2009 Chadian census, the region has a population of 721,166. The main ethnolinguistic groups are the Assangori, Baggara (generally speakers of Chadian Arabic), Dar Sila Daju, Kajakse, Karanga, Kendeje, Maba (including the Marfa sub-group), Mararit, Masalit and Surbakhal.

== Subdivisions ==
Since 2008, the region of Ouaddaï is divided into three departments:

Department	Capital	Sub-prefectures
Abdi	Abdi	Abdi, Abkar Djombo, Biyeré
Assoungha	Adré	Adré, Hadjer Hadid, Mabrone, Borota, Molou, Tourane
Ouara	Abéché	Abéché, Abougoudam, Chokoyan, Bourtaïl, Amleyouna, Gurry, Marfa
