= Languages of Chad =

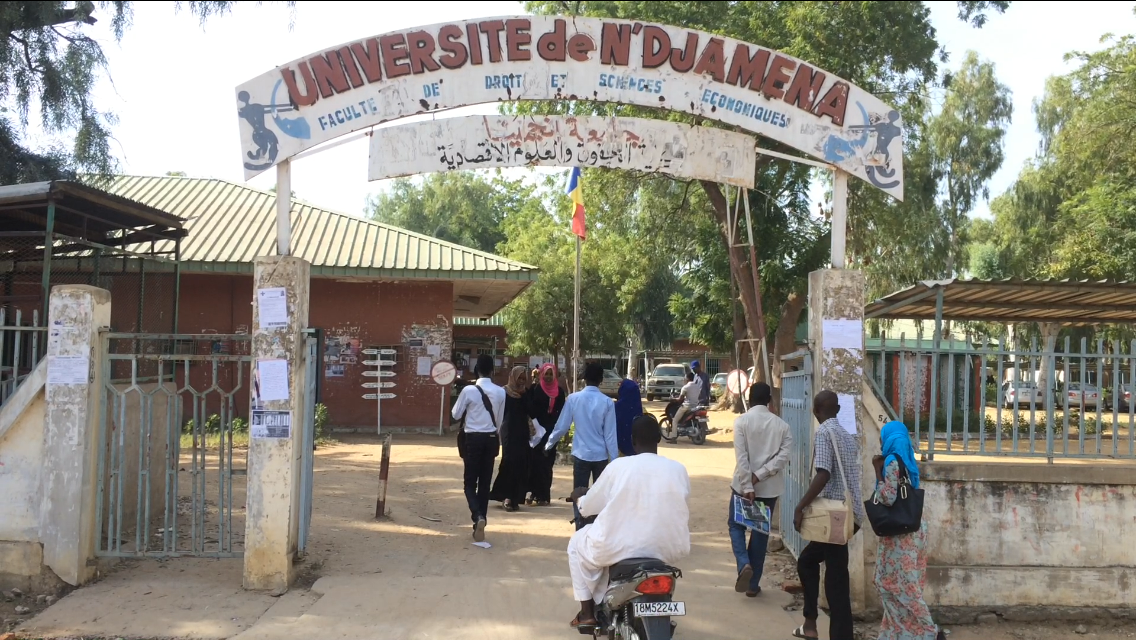
- Signage in French and Arabic at the University of N'Djamena
- Official: French, Arabic
- Indigenous: Chadic languages, Nilo-Saharan languages, Adamawa languages
- Vernacular: Français populaire africain, Chadian Arabic
- Foreign: English
- Signed: Nigerian Sign Language
- Keyboard layout: French AZERTY

Chad has two official languages, French and Arabic. Ethnologue reports over 120 indigenous languages in the country. Nevertheless, French remains the primary language of government and education and is predominant for inter-ethnic communication.

== Official languages ==
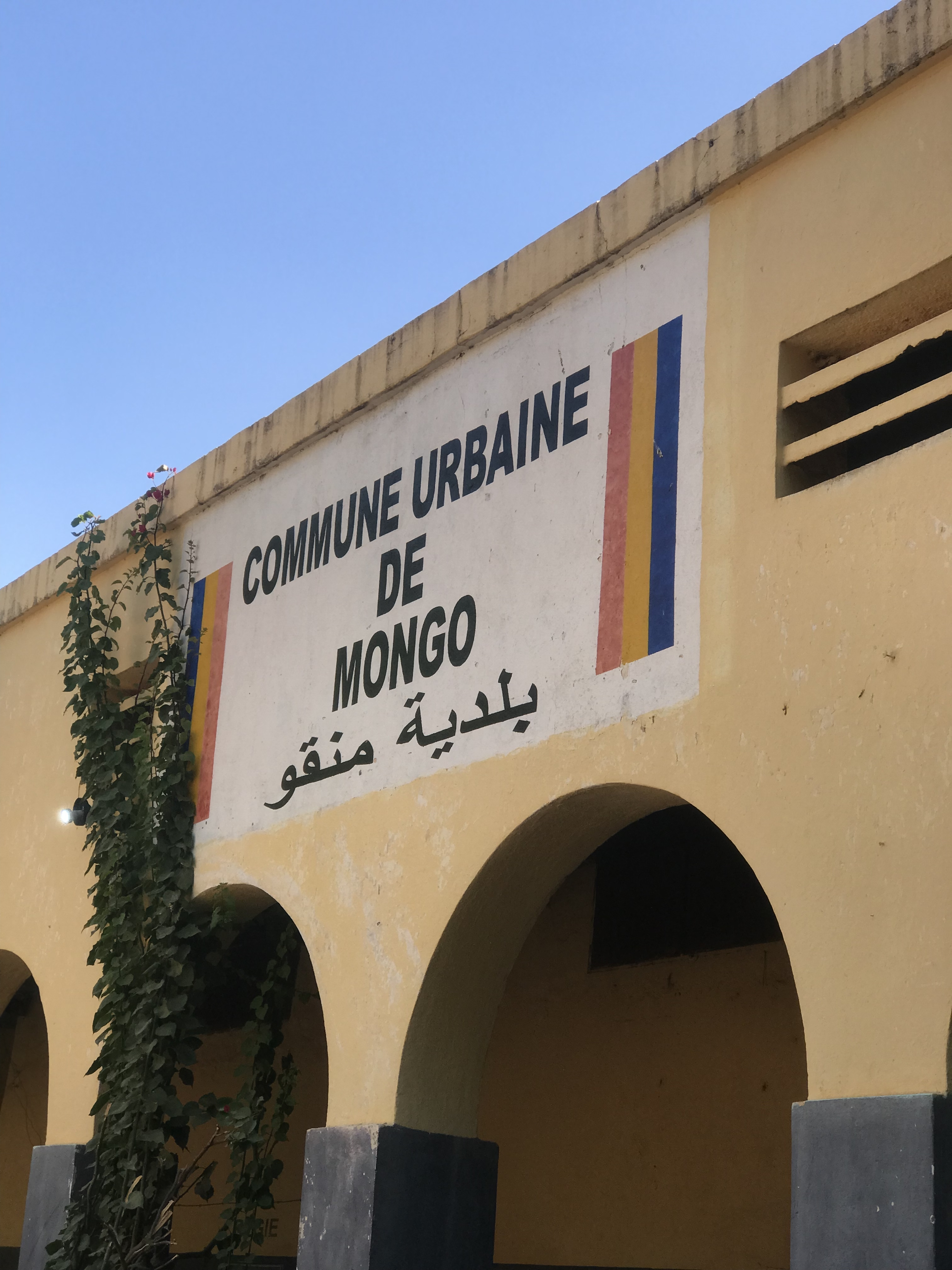
Bilingual (French and Arabic) sign for the commune of Mongo, Chad

The co-official languages of Chad, French and Arabic, reflect Chad's complex sociolinguistic history where indigenous people and languages coexist with two different waves of colonization. Due to governmental bilingualism, inter-ethnic marriages, and language contact, most Chadians are multilingual.

Arabic took hold following 16th century Arab migrations from Sudan, Nubia, and possibly through Trans-Saharan trade routes. A vernacular version of Arabic, Chadian Arabic, is a lingua franca and the language of commerce, spoken by approximately 60% of the population.

France gained control of Chad during the early 20th century, and their colonial policies focused on spreading French as the primary language in Chad. A 1924 letter from the governor general of French Chad declared: "The spread of French is a necessity [...] The native is only allowed to present his/her requests in French." After Chad gained independence in 1960, French was retained by the new government as the official language, in part because it functioned as a neutral choice, rather than having to elevate one indigenous language over another.

Arabic joined French as a co-official language in 1978, as part of a deal ending the Chadian Civil War by increasing northern Chadians' role in government. French remains the dominant language in many workplaces, schools, and administrative institutions. A 2022 analysis found that about 75% of administrative institutions spoke exclusively in French, and a further 20% spoke French and Arabic.

== Non-official languages ==
The language with the most first-language speakers in Chad is likely Ngambay, which has an estimated one million speakers. Ngambay is used as a commercial and inter-ethnic bridge language in Southern Chad and in the capital, N'Djamena.

Many of major indigenous languages of Chad are members of the Sara-Bongo-Bagirmi language branch of the proposed Nilo-Saharan language family. In addition to Ngambay, these include Kaba, Deme, Lutos, and Barma/Bagirmi. These languages are mostly used in southern Chad and some of them extend into neighboring countries, especially Cameroon or the Central African Republic.

In parts of Southern Chad, the linguistic landscape is highly diverse. It is a border region between three language families: Niger-Congo, Nilo-Saharan, and Afro-Asiatic, plus a language isolate, Laal. A 2025 study in two villages along the Chari River found that every villager spoke at least three languages fluently, and most spoke at least four. As a result, even though many of the languages have a small number of speakers, they are relatively vibrant, continuing to get passed down through the generations.

The Chadian government produced the Chadian National Alphabet, which provides Arabic script and Latin script transcription for various Chadian languages.

Chadian Sign Language is a poorly-studied language that is considered to be a variant of Nigerian Sign Language, which is itself based on American Sign Language. Andrew Foster, a Deaf African-American educator, introduced ASL instruction to West Africa beginning in the 1960s, eventually establishing 32 schools across 13 countries. Foster began teaching a summer course in ASL for French-speaking teachers, and this in turn led to the founding of a school in Chad in 1976. Although Foster's course taught ASL-based signs, the language may be more of a creole, combining ASL signs with French structure.

== Languages used in Chad ==
Ethnologue lists 123 living indigenous languages in use in Chad. Of these, 55 are considered Afro-Asiatic languages, 46 are Nilo-Saharan languages, and 23 are Niger-Congo languages. Some languages that have been attested in Chad are listed below.

All languages listed below are taken from Ethnologue's list unless otherwise cited.

=== Niger–Congo languages ===
- Adamawa languages
  - Goundo
  - Kim
- Mbum languages
  - Mundang
  - Tupuri
- Bua languages: Bua, Niellim, Gula Iro, etc.

=== Nilo-Saharan languages ===
- Maban languages
  - Karanga
  - Kendeje
  - Kibet
  - Maba
  - Marfa
  - Massalat
  - Runga
  - Surbakhal
- Fur languages
  - Amdang
  - Fur
- Saharan languages
  - Dazaga
  - Kanembu
  - Tedaga
  - Zaghawa
- Bongo–Bagirmi languages (Central Sudanic)
  - Bernde (Morom)
  - Bagirmi (Barma)
  - Berakou
  - Disa
  - Gula
  - Jaya
  - Kenga
  - Naba
  - Fongoro
  - Ngambay
  - Sar (Madjingay)
- Sinyar
- Eastern Sudanic languages
  - Tama
  - Sungor
  - Mararit
  - Daju

=== Afro-Asiatic languages ===
- Semitic languages
  - Chadian Arabic (co-official language of Chad)
- Chadic languages
  - Bidiyo
  - Buduma
  - Dangaléat
  - Gabri
  - Kabalai
  - Kera
  - Kimré
  - Kwang
  - Lele
  - Marba
  - Masana
  - Masmaje
  - Mesme
  - Migaama
  - Mubi
  - Musey
  - Musgu
  - Nancere
  - Pévé
  - Sokoro
  - Tobanga
  - Tumak

=== Creole languages ===
- Sango
- Bongor Arabic

=== Language isolate ===
- Laal
