= List of endangered languages in Africa =

Endangered languages on the continent of Africa

Language Endangerment Status by UNESCO Atlas of the World's Languages in Danger category

Extinct (EX)
- Extinct (EX): (lists)

Endangered
- Critically Endangered (CR); Severely Endangered (SE); Definitely Endangered (DE); Vulnerable (VU): (list); (list); (list); (list)

Safe
- Safe (NE): no list
- Other categories
- Revived (RE); Constructed (CL): (list); (list)
- Related topics: Atlas of the World's Languages in Danger; Endangered Languages Project; Ethnologue; Unclassified language; List of languages by total number of speakers
- UNESCO Atlas of the World's; Languages in Danger categories

An endangered language is a language that it is at risk of falling out of use, generally because it has few surviving speakers. If it loses all of its native people, it becomes an extinct language. UNESCO defines four levels of language endangerment between "safe" (not endangered) and "extinct":

- Vulnerable
- Definitely endangered
- Severely endangered
- Critically endangered

Africa is the world's second-largest and second most-populous continent. At about 30.2 million km^{2} (11.7 million sq mi) including adjacent islands, it covers 6% of the Earth's total surface area and 20.4% of the total land area. With about 922 million people (as of 2005) in 61 territories, it accounts for about 16.1% of the world's human population. The continent is surrounded by the Mediterranean Sea to the north, the Suez Canal and the Red Sea to the northeast, the Indian Ocean to the southeast, and the Atlantic Ocean to the west. There are 64 countries, including Madagascar and all the island groups.

== Algeria ==
Algeria
Language	Status	Comments	ISO 639-3
Judezmo language	Severely endangered	Also spoken in: Albania, Bosnia and Herzegovina, Bulgaria, Croatia, Greece, Macedonia, Morocco, Romania, Turkey, Serbia	lad
Korandje language	Severely endangered		kcy
Shenwa language	Vulnerable		cnu
Tagargrent language	Severely endangered		oua
Tamahaq language	Vulnerable		thv
Tamazight language	Critically endangered	(Arzew)	rif
Tamzabit language	Vulnerable	Ghardaïa	mzb
Tasnusit language	Severely endangered	Amazigh of Aït Snouss, in Tlemcen	
Tayurayt language	Vulnerable		
Taznatit language	Severely endangered		grr
Tidikelt language	Critically endangered		tia
Tugurt language	Severely endangered		tjo
Zenatiya language	Critically endangered		

== Angola ==
Angola
Language	Status	Comments	ISO 639-3
Bolo language	Definitely endangered		blv

== Benin ==
Benin
Language	Status	Comments	ISO 639-3
Tchumbuli language	Critically endangered		bga

== Botswana ==
Botswana
Language	Status	Comments	ISO 639-3
Danisi language	Critically endangered		shg
Kua language	Definitely endangered		tyu
Taa language	Definitely endangered		nmn
Ts'èxa language	Definitely endangered		
Yeyi language	Definitely endangered		yey
Gui language	Vulnerable		gwj
Xaise language	Critically endangered		shg
ǁAni language	Definitely endangered		hnh
ǁGana language	Vulnerable		gnk
ǂHoa language	Critically endangered		huc

== Burkina Faso ==
Burkina Faso
Language	Status	Comments	ISO 639-3
Pana language	Definitely endangered		png

== Cameroon ==
Cameroon
Language	Status	Comments	ISO 639-3
Akum language	Critically endangered	Also spoken in: Nigeria	aku
Bakole language	Critically endangered		kme
Baldemu language	Critically endangered		bdn
Bati language	Severely endangered		btc
Beezen language	Severely endangered		bnz
Bubia language	Severely endangered		bbx
Bung language	Critically endangered		bqd
Busuu language	Critically endangered		bju
Cambap language	Critically endangered		twn
Dimbong language	Critically endangered		dii
Eman language	Severely endangered		emn
Gyele language	Definitely endangered	Also spoken in: Equatorial Guinea	gyi
Hijuk language	Critically endangered		hij
Hya language	Severely endangered	Also spoken in: Nigeria	hya
Isu language Language	Severely endangered		szv
Iyive language	Severely endangered		uiv
Kendem language	Severely endangered		kvm
Kuk language	Definitely endangered		kfm
Kung language	Severely endangered		kfl
Majera language	Critically endangered		xmj
Maslam language	Severely endangered	Also spoken in: Chad	msv
Mono language (Cameroon)	Critically endangered		mnr
Ndai language	Critically endangered		gke
Njerep language	Critically endangered		
Nubaca language	Severely endangered		baf
Somyev language	Critically endangered	Also spoken in: Nigeria	kgt
Tuotomb language	Severely endangered		ttf
Yasa language	Definitely endangered	Also spoken in: Equatorial Guinea	yko
Zina (Jina) Language	Severely endangered		ISO 639-3 Jia

== Central African Republic ==
Central African Republic
Language	Status	Comments	ISO 639-3
Birri language	Critically endangered		bvq
Geme language	Critically endangered		geq
Ngombe language	Definitely endangered		nmj
Ukhwejo language	Severely endangered		ukh
Yulu language	Vulnerable	Also spoken in: Democratic Republic of the Congo, Sudan	yul

== Chad ==
Chad
Language	Status	Comments	ISO 639-3
Besme language	Severely endangered		bes
Boor language	Critically endangered		bvf
Fania language	Severely endangered		fni
Fongoro language	Severely endangered		fgr
Gadang language	Definitely endangered		gdk
Goundo language	Critically endangered		goy
Jaya language	Severely endangered		jyy
Jonkor Bourmataguil language	Severely endangered		jeu
Karang language	Vulnerable		kth
Kendeje language	Definitely endangered		klf
Koke language	Severely endangered		kou
Kujarge language	Definitely endangered		vkj
Kulfa language	Definitely endangered		kxj
Laal language	Critically endangered		gdm
Mabiri language	Critically endangered		muj
Mambai language	Severely endangered		mcs
Maslam language	Severely endangered	Also spoken in: Cameroon	msv
Massalat language	Critically endangered		mdg
Mbara language	Severely endangered		mpk
Miltu language	Critically endangered		mlj
Noy language	Critically endangered		noy
Saba language	Definitely endangered		saa
Sarwa language	Definitely endangered		swy
Tamki language	Critically endangered		tax
Toram language	Severely endangered		trj
Ubi language	Severely endangered		ubi
Zirenkel language	Definitely endangered		zrn

== Democratic Republic of the Congo ==
Democratic Republic of the Congo
Language	Status	Comments	ISO 639-3
Beeke language	Severely endangered		bkf
Kari language	Severely endangered		kbj
Ngbinda language	Critically endangered		nbd
Yulu language	Vulnerable	Also spoken in: Central African Republic, Sudan	yul

== Egypt ==
Egypt
Language	Status	Comments	ISO 639-3
Domari language	Severely endangered	Also spoken in: Israel, Jordan, Lebanon, Libya, Palestine, Syria	rmt
Siwi language	Definitely endangered		siz

== Equatorial Guinea ==
Equatorial Guinea
Language	Status	Comments	ISO 639-3
Benga language	Definitely endangered	Also spoken in: Gabon	bng
Gyele language	Definitely endangered	Also spoken in: Cameroon	gyi
Yasa language	Definitely endangered	Also spoken in: Cameroon	yko

== Eritrea ==
Eritrea
Language	Status	Comments	ISO 639-3
Dahaalik language	Critically endangered		

== Ethiopia ==
Ethiopia
Language	Status	Comments	ISO 639-3
'Ongota language	Critically endangered		bxe
Anfillo language	Critically endangered		myo
Arbore language	Definitely endangered		arv
Argobba language	Critically endangered		agj
Bambassi language	Definitely endangered		myf
Bayso language	Definitely endangered		bsw
Bussa language	Vulnerable		dox
Chara language	Vulnerable		cra
Dimme language	Vulnerable		dim
Gats'ama - Ganjule - Harro language	Definitely endangered		kcx
Hozo language	Definitely endangered		hoz
K'emant language	Severely endangered		ahg
Karo language	Critically endangered		kxh
Komo language	Definitely endangered	Also spoken in: Sudan	xom
Kwama language	Vulnerable		kmq
Kwegu language	Critically endangered		xwg
Mursi language	Vulnerable		muz
Nayi language	Vulnerable		noz
Opuuo language	Critically endangered		lgn
Oyda language	Vulnerable		oyd
Shabo language	Severely endangered		sbf
Tsamay language	Definitely endangered		tsb
Yem language	Vulnerable		jnj
Zay language	Severely endangered		zwa

== Gabon ==
Gabon
Language	Status	Comments	ISO 639-3
Benga language	Definitely endangered	Also spoken in: Equatorial Guinea	bng
Bwisi language	Definitely endangered	Also spoken in: Congo	bwz
Kaande language	Severely endangered		kbs
Mahongwe language	Severely endangered		mhb
Sake language	Severely endangered		sak
Sighu language	Severely endangered		sxe
Tchitchege language	Definitely endangered		tck
Vumbu language	Definitely endangered		vum

== Ghana ==
Ghana
Language	Status	Comments	ISO 639-3
Animere language	Critically endangered		anf
Kamara language	Definitely endangered		jmr
Konni language	Vulnerable		kma
Tafi language	Vulnerable		tcd
Tuwuli language	Vulnerable		bov

== Guinea ==
Guinea
Language	Status	Comments	ISO 639-3
Badiaranke language	Severely endangered		pbp
Baga Manduri language	Definitely endangered		bmb
Baga Mboteni language	Critically endangered		bgm
Baga Sitemu language	Severely endangered		bsp
Baga Pokur language	Definitely endangered		bcg
Mani language	Critically endangered	Also spoken in: Sierra Leone	buy
Nalu language	Definitely endangered		naj

== Guinea-Bissau ==
Guinea-Bissau
Language	Status	Comments	ISO 639-3
Cobiana language	Critically endangered	Also spoken in: Senegal	kcj
Ediamat language	Vulnerable		eja
Kasanga language	Critically endangered		ccj

== Kenya ==
Kenya
Language	Status	Comments	ISO 639-3
Bong'om language	Definitely endangered		spy
Boni language	Definitely endangered		bob
Burji language	Vulnerable		bji
Dahalo language	Severely endangered		dal
Omotik language	Critically endangered		omt
Suba language	Vulnerable	Also spoken in: Tanzania	sxb, ssc

== Lesotho ==
Lesotho
Language	Status	Comments	ISO 639-3
Phuthi language	Definitely endangered		ssw

== Libya ==
Libya
Language	Status	Comments	ISO 639-3
Awjila language	Severely endangered		auj
Domari language	Severely endangered	Also spoken in: Egypt, Israel, Jordan, Lebanon, Palestine, Syria	rmt
Ghadames language	Vulnerable		gha
Nafusi language	Severely endangered		jbn
Tamahaq language	Definitely endangered		thv

== Mali ==
Mali
Language	Status	Comments	ISO 639-3
Banka language	Definitely endangered		bxw
Tamaceq language	Definitely endangered		taq

== Mauritania ==
Mauritania
Language	Status	Comments	ISO 639-3
Imeraguen language	Definitely endangered		ime
Nemadi language	Critically endangered		
Zenaga language	Severely endangered		zen

== Morocco ==
Morocco
Language	Status	Comments	ISO 639-3
Figuig language	Vulnerable		
Ghomara language	Critically endangered		gho
Judezmo language	Severely endangered	Also spoken in: Albania, Algeria, Bosnia and Herzegovina, Bulgaria, Croatia, Greece, Macedonia, Romania, Turkey, Serbia	lad
Moroccan Judeo-Arabic language	Severely endangered		aju
Sanhaja of Srair language	Critically endangered		sjs
Tamazight language	Definitely endangered	(Beni Iznassen)	rif

== Namibia ==
Namibia
Language	Status	Comments	ISO 639-3
Khwe language	Definitely endangered		xuu

== Niger ==
Niger
Language	Status	Comments	ISO 639-3
Tamajeq language	Vulnerable		thz
Tetserret language	Severely endangered		

== Nigeria ==
Nigeria
Language	Status	Comments	ISO 639-3
Akum language	Critically endangered	Also spoken in: Cameroon	aku
Bade language	Vulnerable		bde
Bakpinka language	Critically endangered		bbs
Defaka language	Critically endangered		afn
Duguza language	Definitely endangered		dza
Dulbu language	Critically endangered		dbo
Fyem language	Severely endangered		pym
Geji cluster	Severely endangered		gji
Gera language	Vulnerable		gew
Gura language	Severely endangered		gvm
Gurdu-Mbaaru language	Severely endangered		grd
Gyem language	Critically endangered		gye
Hya language	Severely endangered	Also spoken in: Cameroon	hya
Ilue language	Critically endangered		ilv
Jilbe language	Critically endangered		jie
Kiong language	Critically endangered		kkm
Kona language	Severely endangered		juo
Kudu-Camo language	Critically endangered		kov
Luri language	Critically endangered		ldd
Mvanip language	Critically endangered		mcj
Ndunda language	Severely endangered		nuh
Ngwaba language	Severely endangered		ngw
Polci cluster	Definitely endangered		plj
Reshe language	Vulnerable		res
Sambe language	Critically endangered		
Somyev language	Critically endangered	Also spoken in: Cameroon	kgt
Yangkam language	Critically endangered		bsx

== Senegal ==
Senegal
Language	Status	Comments	ISO 639-3
Bainouk-Gunyaamolo language	Vulnerable		bcz
Bainouk-Samik language	Severely endangered		bcb
Bandial language	Vulnerable		bqj
Bassari language	Vulnerable		bsc
Bayot language	Vulnerable		bda
Cobiana language	Critically endangered	Also spoken in: Guinea-Bissau	kcj
Gusilay language	Vulnerable		gsl
Jola-Kassa language	Vulnerable		csk
Karone language	Vulnerable		krx
Kwatay language	Severely endangered		cwt
Mancagne language	Vulnerable		knf
Menik language	Definitely endangered		tnr
Mlomp language	Critically endangered		mlo
Noon language	Vulnerable		snf
Paloor language	Vulnerable		fap

== Sierra Leone ==
Sierra Leone
Language	Status	Comments	ISO 639-3
Bom language	Severely endangered		bmf
Kim language	Critically endangered		krm
Mani language	Critically endangered	Also spoken in: Guinea	buy

== South Africa ==
South Africa
Language	Status	Comments	ISO 639-3
Korana language	Critically endangered		kqz
Nǀuu language	Critically endangered		ngh
Xiri language	Critically endangered		xii

== Tanzania ==
Tanzania
Language	Status	Comments	ISO 639-3
Akie language	Critically endangered		oki
Burunge language	Vulnerable		bds
Dhaiso language	Definitely endangered		dhs
Gweno language	Critically endangered		gwe
Hadza language	Vulnerable		hts
Kami language	Severely endangered		kcu
Segeju language	Severely endangered		seg
Suba language	Vulnerable	Also spoken in: Kenya	sxb, ssc
Vidunda language	Vulnerable		vid
Zaramo language	Definitely endangered		zaj

== Tunisia ==
Tunisia
Language	Status	Comments	ISO 639-3
Tamazight language	Severely endangered		
Judeo-Tunisian Arabic language	Critically endangered		ajt

== Uganda ==
Uganda
Language	Status	Comments	ISO 639-3
Amba language	Vulnerable		rwm
Ik language	Severely endangered		ikx
Soo language	Critically endangered		teu

== Western Sahara ==
Western Sahara
Language	Status	Comments	ISO 639-3
Zenaga language	Critically endangered		zen

== See also ==
- Languages of Africa
- List of extinct languages of Africa
- Lists of endangered languages
- List of Bantu languages
- Guthrie classification of Bantu languages
- Language endangerment and extinction in Africa
