= Guéra (province) =

Region of Chad

Coordinates: 12°10′58″N 18°41′05″E

Guéra قيرا Qīrā
- Region
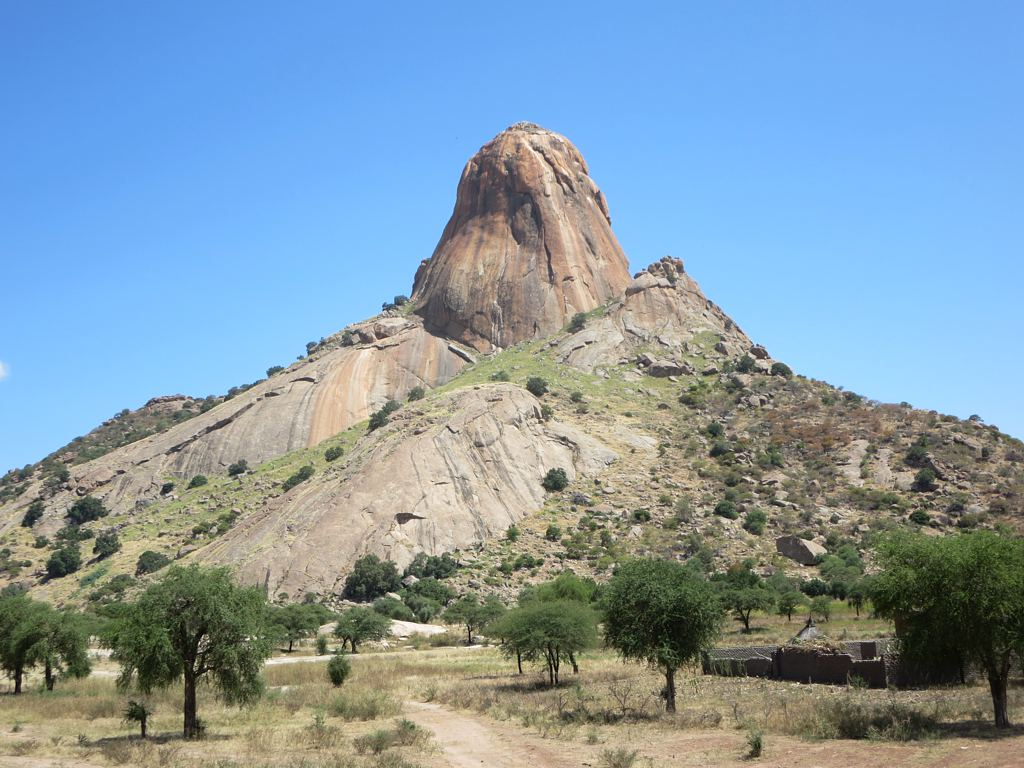
- A granite outcrop west of Bitkine

- Map of Chad showing Guéra.
- Country: Chad
- Departments: 4
- Sub-prefectures: 12
- Regional capital: Mongo

Government
  - Governor: Koldimadji Mirari (2008)

Population (2009)
  - Total: 553,795
- Time zone: UTC+01:00 (WAT)

Guéra (Arabic: قيرا, romanised: Qīrā) is one of the 23 provinces of Chad, created in 2002 from the former Guéra prefecture. The province's capital is Mongo. As of 2009, the population of the region was 553,795.

== Geography ==
The province borders Batha Region to the north, Sila Region and Salamat Region to the east, Moyen-Chari Region to the south, and Chari-Baguirmi Region and Hadjer-Lamis Region to the west. The province contains several mountainous areas, such as the Kadam Massif and the Guéra Massif, the latter of which is composed of granites dissected by numerous dolerite dykes.

The Guéra province receives an annual rainfall of 744 mm (29.3 in). The province is the principal agricultural producing area in the whole country, producing cotton and groundnuts, the two main cash-crops of the country, as well as rice.

Half of the Zakouma National Park lies within the province.

== Subdivisions ==
=== Departments ===
The province of Guéra is divided into four departments, namely:

- Guéra (capital: Mongo)
- Barh Signaka (capital: Melfi)
- Abtouyour (capital: Bitkine)
- Mangalmé (capital: Mangalmé)

=== Sub-prefectures ===
Mongo is the provincial capital. Sub-prefectures are:

- Bang Bang
- Baro
- Bitchotchi
- Bitkine
- Chinguil
- Eref
- Kouka Margni
- Mangalmé
- Melfi
- Mokofi
- Niergui

=== Administration ===
As a part of decentralization in February 2003, the country is administratively split into regions, departments, municipalities and rural communities. The prefectures which were originally 14 in number were re-designated in 17 regions. The regions are administered by Governors appointed by the President. Prefects, who originally held the responsibility of the 14 prefectures, still retained their titles and were responsible for the administration of smaller departments in each region. The members of local assemblies are elected every six years, while the executive organs are elected every three years.

== Demographics ==
As per the census of 2009, the population of the region was 553,795, of which 51.8 per cent were females. The average size of a household as of 2009 was 5.2 people: 5.2 in rural households and 5.3 in urban areas. The number of households was 106,348: 91,557 in rural areas and 14,791 in urban areas. The number of nomads in the region was 15,417 (4 per cent of the population). There were 552,378 people residing in private households. There were 239,451 above 18 years of age: 107,285 male and 132,166 female. The sex ratio was 93 females for every hundred males. There were 538,378 sedentary staff, comprising 5 per cent of the population.

As of 2016, the population of Guéra region was 564,910. There were 1,116 villages in 2016.

=== Ethnic groups ===
The main ethnolinguistic groups are broadly split into Arabs groups such as the Baggara, generally speaking Chadian Arabic (21.11%), and a diverse group of peoples collectively termed the Hadjarai (66.18%).

Hadjarai is an Arabic term and comprises numerous separate groups within Guéra. These Hadjerai ethnic groups speak a variety of East Chadic B languages, Bagirmi languages, and Bua languages, including:

- Barein
- Bidiyo
- Bolgo
- Dangaléat
- Kenga
- Migaama
- Mogum
- Sokoro

Other groups in the region include:

- Birgit
- Dar Daju Daju
- Disa
- Fania
- Gula groups such as the Bon Gula and Zan Gula
- Jaya
- Jonkor Bourmataguil
- Koke
- Mabire
- Mawa
- Mubi
- Mukulu
- Naba
- Saba
- Tamki
- Ubi
- Zirenkel
