= Hadjarai peoples =

Chadian people

The Hadjarai are a group of peoples comprising 6.7% of the population of Chad, or more than 150,000 people. The name is an Arabic exonym, literally meaning "[those] of the stones" (i.e. of the mountains). It is used collectively to describe several distinct ethnic groups living in the hilly Guéra Region.

== Subgroups and culture ==
The fifteen Hadjarai ethnic groups include the Dajus, Kengas, Junkun, Dangaleats, Mogoums, Sokoros, Sabas, Barains, Bidios, Yalnas, Bolgos, Koffas, Migami and Djongors. Most of these are small farmers. Over 90% of Hadjarai women have undergone female genital cutting.

The Hadjarai groups speak diverse languages mostly belonging to the East Chadic B group, with some belonging to the unrelated Adamawa and Sara-Bongo-Bagirmi groups. However, they also share many cultural traits, the most prevalent of which is a common belief in margais, i.e., invisible spirits that control the natural elements. This belief has survived the rapid conversion of most Hadjarai to Islam during the colonial period, despite attempts by the French colonial authorities to avoid Islamization through the promotion of Christian missions.

== History ==
Though never united in the past, the Hadjarai people share a strong spirit of independence, forged in pre-colonial Chad by their repeated clashes with slave-raiding razzias in their territory, and supported in particular by the Ouaddai Kingdom. This tradition of independence has led to frequent clashes with the central government after Chad gained independence in 1960, at first largely because of attempts to force them to move from the hills to the plains. They were among the staunchest supporters of the rebels during the Chadian Civil War.

Although the Hadjarai played a crucial role in bringing to power Hissène Habré in 1982, they grew alienated from him after the death of their spokesman Idriss Miskine. They suffered heavily in 1987, after Habré launched a campaign of terror against them in response to the formation of the MOSANAT rebel movement, and members of the group were arrested and even killed en masse. 840 of those arrested appear to have been immediately killed.

The Hadjarai became important supporters of Idriss Déby's rebellion against the President and contributed to Habré's downfall in 1990. A crisis among Déby and the Hadjarai leadership flared in 1991 after an alleged coup attempt. Countless Hadjarai were incarcerated as fighting spread to the Hadjarai territory, despite efforts by Déby to reassure the local population of Guéra.
