= Tandjilé (region) =

Region of Chad

Coordinates: 9°24′N 16°18′E

Tandjilé تانجلي Tānjīlī
- Region
- Map of Chad showing Tandjilé.
- Country: Chad
- Departments: 2
- Sub-prefectures: 13
- Regional capital: Laï

Population (2009)
  - Total: 661,906
- Time zone: UTC+01:00 (WAT)

Tandjilé (Arabic: تانجلي, romanised: Tānjīlī) is one of the 23 regions of Chad, located in the south-west of the country. Its capital is Laï. It corresponds to the former prefecture of the same name.

== Geography ==
The region borders Chari-Baguirmi Region to the north, Moyen-Chari Region and Mandoul Region to the east, Logone Occidental Region and Logone Oriental Region to the south, and Mayo-Kebbi Ouest Region and Mayo-Kebbi Est Region to the west.

=== Settlements ===
Laï is the capital of the region; other major settlements include Baktchoro, Béré, Dafra, Déressia, Dono Manga, Guidari, Kélo and N'Dam.

== Demography ==
As per the 2009 Chadian census the total population was 661,906. The region had 458,240 inhabitants in 1993, of whom 442,876 sedentary (rural, 385,537; urban, 57,339) and 15,364 nomad. The main ethnolinguistic groups are the Besme, Gabri, Goundo, Kabalai, Kim, Kimré, Kwang, Lele, Mango, Marba, Mesme, Mire, Nangtchéré, Ndam, the Sara Ngambay, Somrai, Tobanga and Tumak.

== Subdivisions ==
The region of Tandjilé is divided into three departments:

Department	Capital (chef-lieu)	Sub-prefectures
Tandjilé Est	Laï	Laï, Deressia, Dono Manga, Guidari, N'Dam
Tandjilé Ouest	Kélo	Kélo, Baktchoro, Béré, Bologo, Dafra, Delbian, Dogou, Kolon
Tandjilé Centre	Béré	Béré, Delbian, Tchoua
