= Niergui =

Coordinates: 11°58′N 18°49′E

- Sub-prefecture
- Location in Chad
- Country: Chad

Niergui is a sub-prefecture of Guéra Region in Chad.

== Demographics ==
Ethnic composition by canton in 2016:

Abbassié Canton (population: 8,993; villages: 10):

| Ethnic group | Linguistic affiliation | Percentage |
|---|---|---|
| Abassié | East Chadic? | 75 |
| Bidio | East Chadic | 15 |
| Dangléat | East Chadic | 10 |

Bidio Canton (population: 14,062; villages: 63):

| Ethnic group | Linguistic affiliation | Percentage |
|---|---|---|
| Bidio | East Chadic | 90 |
| Arab | Semitic | 3 |
| Mubi | East Chadic | 2 |

Koffa Canton (population: 3,500; villages: 12):

| Ethnic group | Linguistic affiliation | Percentage |
|---|---|---|
| Koffa | East Chadic | 75 |
| Arab | Semitic | 15 |
| Mubi | East Chadic | 10 |
