= Mire language =

Afro-Asiatic language of Chad

Mire
- Mulgi
- Native to: Chad
- Region: Southwest
- Native speakers: 5,000 (2011)
- Language family: Afro-Asiatic: Chadic; East Chadic; East Chadic A; Sibine (A.1.1); Mire

Language codes
- ISO 639-3: mvh
- Glottolog: mire1238

Mire, or Mulgi, is an Afro-Asiatic language spoken in the southwestern Chadian prefectures of Tandjile Prefecture and Lai Prefecture. Most of the speakers, who generally practice traditional religions or Christianity, speak Ndam (65% lexical similarity) or Kimré (32% lexical similarity) as a second language.
