= Tumak =

Tumak may refer to:

- Tumak, Astrakhan Oblast, Russia
- Tumak language
- One Million B.C., an American fantasy film
- Tumak (annelid), a genus of annelids in the family Tumakidae
