= Baguirmi =

Baguirmi or Bagirmi may refer to:

- Baguirmi Department
- Baguirmi language
- Baguirmi people
- Sultanate of Baguirmi
