= Bang Bang, Chad =

Bang Bang
- Sub-prefecture
- Location in Chad
- Coordinates: 12.0628°N 18.3629°E
- Country: Chad

Bang Bang is a sub-prefecture of Guéra Region in Chad.

== Demographics ==
Ethnic composition by canton in 2016:

Dangueléat Est Canton (population: 38,125; villages: 15):

Ethnic group	Linguistic affiliation	Percentage
Dangléat	East Chadic	80
Arab	Semitic	15
Jonkor	East Chadic	5

Dangueléat Ouest Canton (population: 26,462; villages: 8):

Ethnic group	Linguistic affiliation	Percentage
Dangléat	East Chadic	90
Arab	Semitic	7
Jonkor	East Chadic	3
