= Lele language (Chad) =

East Chadic language of Chad

Lele
- Native to: Chad
- Native speakers: (26,000 cited 1991)
- Language family: Afro-Asiatic: Chadic; East Chadic; East Chadic A; Nancere (A.2.1); Lele

Language codes
- ISO 639-3: lln
- Glottolog: lele1276

Lele is an East Chadic language spoken in the Tandjilé Region, in the Tandjilé Ouest department, south of Kélo.

== Phonology ==
=== Vowels ===
Lele has five underlying vowels. The mid vowels are lower mid rather than higher mid. All vowels may have long variants.

IPA chart of vowels
	Front	Central	Back
High	[i]		[u]
Mid	[e]		[o]
Low		[a]	

=== Consonants ===
There are some asymmetries in Lele's consonant inventory.

Consonants
		Labial	Alveolar	Palatal	Velar	Labio-velar	Glottal
Nasal		[m]	[n]	[ɲ]	[ŋ]		
Plosive	voiceless	[p]	[t]	[tʃ]	[k]	[kp]	
Plosive	voiced	[b]	[d]	[dʒ]	[ɡ]	[ɡb]	
Plosive	implosive	[ɓ]	[ɗ]				
Plosive	prenasalized	[ᵐb]	[ⁿd]			[ᵑb]	
Fricative			[s]				[h]
Trill			[r]				
Approximant	median	[w]		[j]			
Approximant	lateral		[l]				

== Grammar ==
=== Nouns ===
Nouns are grammatically masculine or feminine, but there are no morphological markings of gender on the nouns. This distinction is only seen in the agreement system (covert gender). Only a subset of nouns are marked for plural: large animals, kinship terms and a few inanimate objects. Plurals nouns are marked in a variety of ways including a suffix /-e/ or /-we/ and an infix /-a-/. There are three nouns that have irregular plural forms: "woman", "hen" and "person".

There is a grammatical distinction between alienable and inalienable possession in the noun phrase. In inalienable possession, a singular possessor is marked by a suffix on the noun indexing the possessor (possessor agreement suffix). In plural inalienable possession and all alienable, the possessor is indexed by a pronominal word following the noun.

=== Verbs ===
The tense-aspect-mood system includes four verbal forms labeled "past", "future", "nominal" and "imperative". The "past" form normally has a stem-final vowel /i/. The "future" and "nominal" forms both have a stem-final vowel /e/. They are distinguished from each other by a high tone on the first syllable of the "future" form. The imperative form normally has a stem-final vowel /a/ or /u/.

Some verbs also have a plural form indicated by a suffix /-wi/ or a devoiced initial consonant. The plural form of the verb can indicate the plurality of an action, a plural intransitive subject, or a plural object. Verbs can also be modified by adverbs, including a class of ideophones, by a "ventive" marker (derived from the verb "come") following the verb, or an "inceptive" marker (derived from the verb "leave") preceding the verb.

=== Pronouns ===
The reference system makes a 10-way distinction. Gender is distinguished in second and third person singular pronouns. The first person non-singular pronouns include a dual inclusive form, a plural inclusive form, and a plural exclusive form. The plural inclusive form is a bimorphemic pronoun which combines the first person dual inclusive form with the second person plural form.

=== Word order ===
In a pragmatically neutral sentence, nominal arguments occur in a SVO word order. However, third person subject pronouns usually follow the verb.

== Bibliography ==
- Cope, Pamela Simons. 1993. The plural in Lele. JWAL 23(1)
- Cope, Pamela Simons and Donald A. Burquest. 1986. Some comments on nasalization in Lele. JWAL 16(2)
- Cope, Pamela Simons (2010). Dictionnaire lélé-français : suivi d'un index français-lélé. Essai de description lexicale de la langue tchadique parlée dans la région de Kélo, Tchad (in French). Nicolas Quint. Paris: L'Harmattan. ISBN 978-2-296-10335-1. OCLC 608164729.
- Frajzyngier, Zygmunt. 1995. Two complementizers in Lele. In Ibriszimow, Dymitr and Leger, Rudolf (eds.), Studia chadica et hamitosemitica: Akten des internationalen Symposions zur Tschadsprachenforschung Johann Wolfgang Goethe-Universität, Frankfurt am Main, 6.-8. Mai 1991, 163-170. Köln: Rüdiger Köppe Verlag.
- Frajzyngier, Zygmunt. 2001. A grammar of Lele. Stanford: CSLI Publications.
- Lami, Pierre. 1942. Etude succincte de la langue lélé et du dialecte nantchoa. Beirut: Imprimérie Catholique. 197pp.
- Lami, Pierre. 1951. Le nombre et le genre dans la langue lélé. In Comptes rendus du première conférence international des africanistes de l'ouest, Dakar 1945, 197-208. Dakar: Inst. Français de l'Afrique Noire (IFAN).
- Simons, Pamela. 1982. Nè... be marking in Lele: a cleft construction. Studies in African Linguistics 13. 217-229.
