= Sarwa language =

Sarwa language may refer to:

- Tshwa language (Sesarwa, Botswana)
- Sarua language (Chad)

== See also ==
- Sharwa language
