= Jelkung language =

Afro-Asiatic language of Chad

Jelkung
- Native to: Chad
- Region: south central
- Native speakers: (1,300, including Saba cited 2000)
- Language family: Afro-Asiatic: Chadic; East Chadic; East Chadic B; Mubi (B.1.2); Jelkung

Language codes
- ISO 639-3: saa (as a synonym of Saba)
- Glottolog: None

Jelkung is a possible Afro-Asiatic language spoken in south central Chad.

Ethnologue 18 lists Jelkung as a synonym of Saba, in a different branch of East Chadic.
