= Télé-Nugar Iron Mines =

Iron ore mine in Guera, Chad

Coordinates: 10.1723°N 18.5689°E

The iron mines of Tele-Nugar are located approximately 155 km south of the regional center of Melfi, in Barhr Signaka Department, Guera Region, Chad.

== Site description ==
Discovered in 1911, the iron mines comprise an area roughly 1000 m in diameter. The Fanian people who utilized the site extracted iron and reduced it into a final product. Several holes can be found dispersed throughout the site, allowing sufficient ventilation and illumination for the miners working below. Pillars help support a main arch in the mine, which were sculpted directly into the walls.

== Archaeology ==
Archaeological specimens found at the site include stove walls used for iron reduction, blast pipe fragments, pottery shards, and slag heaps.

== Other site uses ==
In addition to being used as a source of iron and processing location, the mine was also used as defensive shelter for the Fanians during raids from the Ouaddai Kingdom.

== World Heritage status ==
This site was added to the UNESCO World Heritage Tentative List on July 21, 2005 in the Cultural category.
