= Menodji Clarisse =

- Also known as: Melodji
- Born: 1994
- Origin: Chad
- Genres: Afro beats, American pop
- Occupation: Singer

Menodji Clarisse (born 1994), professionally known as Melodji, is a Chadian singer who was the lead vocalist of Matania, a group composing five female singers.

== Early life ==
Menodji Clarisse was born in 1994 in N'Djamena, the capital of Chad. As a child, she learned to sing in her church choir.

== Career ==
Melodji became a part of the band Matania in 2001, taking the role of lead vocalist. The band placed an emphasis on speaking out against domestic violence and demanding equal treatment for women in marriage, in part due to their somewhat unique situation of being a popular musical group composed of a majority of women. The group sings in French, Arabic, and Saba, and Melodji contributes with English vocals, resulting in the group being referred to as a cultural melting pot. The group, and Melodji in particular, are influenced by Rhythm and Blues, traditional Afro beats, and contemporary American pop music.

Following the success of Matania in 2007 due to their performance at the CEN-SAD Games in Niger, Melodji struck out on her own as a solo artist. Her popularity continued to increase, and she released her first solo album in 2014. Called Tah Hor Ndal (Around the Fire), the album was nominated at the Cameroon Academy Awards. That same year, Melodji was a finalist at the RFI Prix Découverte.
