= KVF =

KVF or kvf may refer to:

- Kabalai language (ISO 639-3: kvf), Afro-Asiatic language spoken in southwest Chad
- Kringvarp Føroya, the national public broadcasting company of the Faroe Islands
