= Mongo Airport =

- IATA: MVO; ICAO: FTTM

Summary
- Airport type: Public
- Owner: Government
- Serves: Mongo
- Location: Chad
- Elevation AMSL: 1,404 ft / 428 m
- Coordinates: 12°10′12.9″N 018°40′31.3″E

Map
- Location of Mongo Airport in Chad

Runways
Direction	Length		Surface
Direction	ft	m	Surface
06/24	5,250	1,600	Grass
- Source: Landings.com

Mongo Airport (IATA: MVO, ICAO: FTTM) (Arabic: مطار مونقو) is a public use airport located near Mongo, Guéra, Chad.

== See also ==
- List of airports in Chad
