= Miltu language =

Afro-Asiatic language of Chad

Miltu
- Native to: Chad
- Region: southwest
- Native speakers: (270 cited 1993)
- Language family: Afro-Asiatic: Chadic; East Chadic; East Chadic A; Miltu languages (A.1.2); Miltu

Language codes
- ISO 639-3: mlj
- Glottolog: milt1241
- ELP: Miltu

Miltu (also known as Miltou or Gàlì) is an endangered Afro-Asiatic language spoken in southwestern Chad, in villages along the Chari River in the area of Bousso. A 1993 census reported 270 speakers. Speakers are shifting to Bagirmi.
