= Somrai language =

Afro-Asiatic language of Chad

Somrai
- Chibne, bii gə chibne
- Native to: Chad
- Region: Southwest
- Native speakers: (7,400 cited 1993 census)
- Language family: Afro-Asiatic: Chadic; East Chadic; East Chadic A; Sibine (A.1.1); Somrai

Language codes
- ISO 639-3: sor
- Glottolog: somr1248

Somrai (Sumrey,sɨmray), also known as Sibine (Shibne, chibne), is an Afro-Asiatic language spoken in the southwestern Chadian prefectures of Tandjilé and Lai. The speakers or Somrai are not bilingual; the language is not mutually intelligible with any other, as its highest lexical similarity with another language is with Ndam (42%). Most of the speakers, who call themselves Shibne or Sibine, generally practice traditional religions, Christianity, or Islam.
