= Kajakse language =

Afro-Asiatic language of eastern Chad

Kajakse
- Native to: Chad
- Region: east
- Native speakers: (10,000 cited 1983)
- Language family: Afro-Asiatic: Chadic; East Chadic; East Chadic B; Mubi (B.1.2); Kajakse

Language codes
- ISO 639-3: ckq
- Glottolog: kaja1254

Kajakse (also known as Kadjakse, Kajeske, Kujarke, Mini, Kawa Tadimini) is an Afro-Asiatic language spoken in eastern Chad.
