= Mukulu =

Mukulu may be,

- Mukulu language
  - The Mokilko language of Chad
  - The Mukulu dialect of Zambia
- Jamil Mukulu

== See also ==
- Cardiocorax mukulu (sp. plesiosaur)
