= Toram =

Toram may refer to:

- Toram language, an Afro-Asiatic language spoken in central Chad
- Toram, a boot parameter for Linux distributions that run from RAM
