= Mokofi =

Coordinates: 11°36′N 17°19′E

- Sub-prefecture
- Location in Chad
- Country: Chad

Mokofi is a sub-prefecture of Guéra Region in Chad.

== Demographics ==
Ethnic composition by canton in 2016:

Dayakhiré Canton (population: 23,700; villages: 103):

Ethnic group	Linguistic affiliation	Percentage
Dayakhire	?	50
Bagirmi	Bagirmi	30
Bilala	Bagirmi	20

Mokofi Canton (population: 16,930; villages: 71):

Ethnic group	Linguistic affiliation	Percentage
Arab	Semitic	40
Bagirmi	Bagirmi	35
Sokoro	East Chadic	25

Mousmaré Canton (population: 10,373; villages: 51):

Ethnic group	Linguistic affiliation	Percentage
Bagirmi	Bagirmi	50
Dayakhire	?	30
Fulata	Senegambian	20
