= Béré, Chad =

Béré
- Location in Chad
- Coordinates: 9°18′56″N 16°9′35″E
- Country: Chad
- Region: Tandjilé Occidental
- Department: Tandjilé Ouest
- Sub-Prefecture: Béré

Population (2012)
  - Total: 14,666
- Time zone: UTC+1

Béré is a town in the Tandjilé Region, Chad. It is known for its weekly market on Saturdays. The economy is agricultural-based, producing rice, sorghum, peanuts, sesame and cotton.

A Seventh-day Adventist Church hospital has 70 beds.

== Population ==
Population by years:\

| 1993 | 2012 est. |
|---|---|
| 10,799 | 14,666 |

== Notable people ==
- Kaar Kaas Sonn (1973-), musician
