= Melfi Airport =

- IATA: MEF; ICAO: none

Summary
- Airport type: Public
- Owner: Government
- Serves: Melfi
- Location: Chad
- Elevation AMSL: 1,293 ft / 394 m
- Coordinates: 11°3′0″N 017°57′0″E

Map
- Location of Melfi Airport in Chad

Runways
Direction	Length		Surface
Direction	ft	m	Surface
11/29	3,937	1,200	Sand
- Source: Landings.com

Melfi Airport (IATA: MEF) is a public use airport located near Melfi, Guéra, Chad.

== See also ==
- List of airports in Chad
