= Language endangerment and extinction in Africa =

A map of language families in Africa

Language endangerment and extinction in Africa is the decline and gradual disappearance of indigenous African tongues. As a region, Africa is one of the most linguistically diverse in the world, with estimates ranging from 1,500 to 3,000 languages spoken across the continent. However, UNESCO now records roughly 2,500 endangered languages worldwide, with nearly 428 considered threatened in Africa alone, and warns that up to 10% of African languages may vanish within a century.

A major reason for the endangerment and extinction of African languages may be the pressure of European colonial rule and its legacy. European powers tended to promote only their own languages (and a few dominant African lingua francas) in administration, education and media. The prestige of European colonial languages persisted in the post-colonial era whereby English, French or Portuguese are used in the media and education in nearly all sub-Saharan African countries, and local languages are sidelined. UNESCO notes that fewer than 20% of pupils in Francophone Africa are taught in their mother tongue, a factor limiting educational attainment. Some of the more dominant indigenous languages (such as Luganda, Somali, Kiswahili, and Hausa) are also used for supra-ethnic communication, and smaller languages in different communities became less frequently used. African languages perceived as being of low status and became restricted in use are endangered and at risk of extinction.

While the extinction of some African languages appears inevitable, some languages considered endangered may be revitalized through positive government actions, for example the Suba language.

== Colonial-era language policies ==
European colonial regimes imposed systematic language policies that favoured their own languages. Missionary schools in the 19th century often taught literacy in local vernaculars to aid conversion. However, colonial states soon took control: by the early 20th century governments were legislating in favour of European languages. For example, in French West Africa a 1905 law separated church and state and effectively banned schooling in African languages (mandating French as the sole medium). In British colonies education was more decentralised, but English was introduced early as a subject and promoted as key to advancement. In 1927 the British Colonial Office's Advisory Committee on Native Education explicitly recommended using indigenous African languages as medium of instruction in the first years of primary school.

By mid-century most colonial administrations required proficiency in the colonial language. Swahili and Hausa were standardised and used widely in East and West Africa (facilitating indirect rule), but hundreds of smaller tongues were ignored. After World War II and into the 1950s, nationalist movements pressed for mother-tongue education, but the reality remained that English, French or Portuguese dominated schooling and official life. At independence (1950s–1960s), newly independent states often retained the colonial language as official (e.g. English in Nigeria, French in Senegal) while sometimes adding one or two local languages. In some places (like Tanzania under Julius Nyerere) African languages were promoted; elsewhere (as in much of francophone Africa) indigenous languages received little official support.

Post-independence constitutions gradually recognised African languages. For example, South Africa's 1996 constitution granted official status to eleven indigenous languages alongside English and Afrikaans. Kenya's 2010 constitution made Swahili the national language and directed the state to "promote and protect the diversity of language" and the development of indigenous tongues. Nigeria's 1979 and 1999 constitutions recognise Hausa, Igbo and Yoruba as national languages (used in parliament alongside English), but English remains the sole language of government and education at higher levels. Internationally, bodies like UNESCO have highlighted the crisis: UNESCO warns that half of today's languages may be "extinct or seriously endangered by 2100," and it now promotes integrating African languages into schools and digital media.

== Major African language families ==
Africa's languages fall into several large families and isolates. The largest family is Niger–Congo (especially the Bantu branch), with over 1,400 languages spoken by more than 360 million people. These include major languages like Swahili, Yoruba, Igbo, Zulu and Shona, but also many very small Bantu languages.

Afroasiatic languages (Cushitic, Chadic, Semitic, Berber and others) number a few hundred. Large Afroasiatic languages (Arabic, Hausa, Oromo, Amharic, Somali) have tens of millions of speakers, but smaller Cushitic or Chadic tongues can be endangered. For example, in Kenya the Cushitic Yaaku (Yakunte) language has only a handful of elderly speakers left.

Nilo-Saharan languages include some large Nilotic tongues (Dinka, Luo, Maasai), but many are spoken by small communities.

Khoisan families of southern Africa (including Khoe, San and Hadza languages) have only about 35 languages total, spoken by roughly 100,000 people. Many Khoisan languages have only a few hundred speakers at most, making them the most critically endangered group. In South Africa, four Khoisan languages are already extinct and others like N|uu almost vanished.

== Country case studies ==
=== Nigeria ===
Nigeria is Africa's most linguistically diverse nation, with over 500 languages. Three major languages, Hausa, Igbo and Yoruba, each have millions of speakers and serve as regional lingua francas. Colonial and post-colonial policy made English the official language nationwide.

Hundreds of minority tongues in central Nigeria are spoken by only a few hundred people. One source notes that "80% of Nigerians between the ages of 2 and 18 have difficulty speaking their mother tongues." Colonial educational policies replaced local languages with English, and even though Hausa, Igbo and Yoruba are recognised, other tongues receive little support.

=== South Africa ===
South Africa's eleven official languages include nine major indigenous tongues plus English and Afrikaans. Under colonialism and apartheid, only European languages were official. The apartheid-era education system severely restricted African-language instruction. Only with the 1996 constitution did indigenous languages gain formal recognition.

Khoisan languages are most vulnerable. N|uu was thought extinct until a few speakers were rediscovered; only one fluent N|uu speaker remains. Other San languages survive with only a few hundred speakers. Even among Bantu languages, smaller tongues lack support. Education and economics favour English.

PanSALB now partners to publish books in marginalised languages as a remedy.

=== Kenya ===
Kenya is home to over 40 indigenous languages. The 2010 constitution names Swahili as the national language and gives Swahili and English official status. In practice, English dominates. UNESCO notes Kenya has the highest number of extinct languages in East Africa.

The Yaaku community of Central Kenya lost its Cushitic language Yakunte due to assimilation. By 2010 only seven elderly people spoke it. A Goethe-Institut report lists Yakunte, Boni, Burji, Ongamo, Suba and others as endangered.

== Impact of globalisation and digital technology ==
Worldwide media overwhelmingly use global languages like English or French, reinforcing their prestige. UNESCO estimates that half of today's languages will be extinct or severely endangered by 2100.

However, technology also enables preservation. PanSALB and Wikipedia have organised workshops to create content in African languages. In 2025 a Wikipedia-Africa workshop, called the SWiP Project, in South Africa trained participants to write new articles in isiXhosa, isiZulu and others.

The African Storybook initiative provides free children's storybooks in dozens of African languages. Mobile apps and platforms like Duolingo now offers Yoruba, Swahili, Zulu and Hausa.

AI and machine translation are also in use. In Mali, AI tools produced over 140 children's books in Bambara in one year.

== Education, legislation and socio-economic pressures ==
Language loss is linked to education and socio-economic factors. African children were educated in colonial languages, which became associated with jobs and success. Today most African nations still teach in the former colonial language. UNESCO notes children taught in their mother tongue are 30% more likely to read with comprehension.

Socio-economic pressures also drive shift: families prioritise languages of power (like English or Hausa) over their ancestral tongues. Urbanisation and migration compound this. Many endangered languages now have only elderly speakers. Without institutional support, literacy and intergenerational transmission decline.

== Language revival and preservation initiatives ==
Efforts include:

- Digitisation and content. Wikipedia and Wikimedia support content creation in African languages. Social media and radio also aid visibility.
- Education and publishing. PanSALB and Culturally and Linguistically Diverse (CALD) support teaching in African languages. South Africa published children's books in N|uu despite its near extinction.
- Legal support. Ethiopia, Senegal and Namibia have passed language-support laws. The United Nations declared 2022–2032 the Decade of Indigenous Languages.
- Technology. AI, apps and online dictionaries help with preservation and teaching.

== Some of the endangered African languages ==
| Language | Country | Status | ISO 639‑3 |
|---|---|---|---|
| Bom | Sierra Leone | Severely endangered | bmf |
| Kim | Sierra Leone | Critically endangered | krm |
| Mani | Sierra Leone | Critically endangered | buy |
| Korana | South Africa | Critically endangered | kqz |
| Nǀuu | South Africa | Critically endangered | ngh |
| Xiri | South Africa | Critically endangered | xii |
| Akie | Tanzania | Critically endangered | oki |
| Burunge | Tanzania | Vulnerable | bds |
| Dhaiso | Tanzania | Definitely endangered | dhs |
| Gweno | Tanzania | Critically endangered | gwe |
| Hadza | Tanzania | Vulnerable | hts |
| Kami | Tanzania | Severely endangered | kcu |
| Segeju | Tanzania | Severely endangered | seg |
| Suba | Tanzania/Kenya | Vulnerable | sxb,ssc |
| Amba | Uganda | Vulnerable | rwm |
| Ik | Uganda | Severely endangered | ikx |
| Soo | Uganda | Critically endangered | teu |
| Zenaga | Western Sahara | Critically endangered | zen |

== Some of the extinct African languages ==
| Language | Region / Country | Language Family | Extinct / Last Speaker |
|---|---|---|---|
| Yaakunte (Yaaku) | Central Kenya | Cushitic | ~2010 |
| Elmolo | Lake Turkana, Kenya | Eastern Nilotic | mid‑20th century |
| Kore | Lamu Island, Kenya | Maa (Nilotic) | mid‑20th century |
| Lorkoti | Rift Valley, Kenya | Maa (Nilotic) | late 20th century |
| Kinare | Rift Valley, Kenya | Nilo‑Saharan | 1976 |
| Sogoo (Okiek) | Rift Valley, Kenya | Nilo‑Saharan | 1970s |
| Omotik | Great Rift Valley, Kenya | Nilo‑Saharan | |
| Seroa | Xhariep, South Africa | Tuu (Khoisan) | 19th century |
| ǀXam | South Africa & Lesotho | Tuu (Khoisan) | 1910s |
| ǁXegwi | Lake Chrissie, South Africa | Tuu (Khoisan) | 1988 |
| ǁKā | Vaal River, South Africa | Tuu (Khoisan) | |
| ǂUngkue | Vaal River, South Africa | Tuu (Khoisan) | |
| Kwadi | southwest Angola | Khoisan (Khoe–Kwadi) | ~1960s–1980s |
| Gafat | Ethiopia | Afro‑Asiatic (Semitic) | 1947 |
| Torona | South Kordofan, Sudan | Niger–Congo | 2014 |
| Zumaya | Cameroon | Afro‑Asiatic (Chadic) | ~2006 |
| Gule | Blue Nile State, Sudan | Language isolate | post‑1932 |

== See also ==
- List of extinct languages of Africa
- List of endangered languages in Africa
