= East Chadic languages =

Afro-Asiatic language branch

East Chadic
- Geographic distribution: southern Chad and northern Cameroon
- Linguistic classification: Afro-Asiatic: Chadic; East Chadic
- Subdivisions: East Chadic A; East Chadic B

Language codes
- Glottolog: east2632
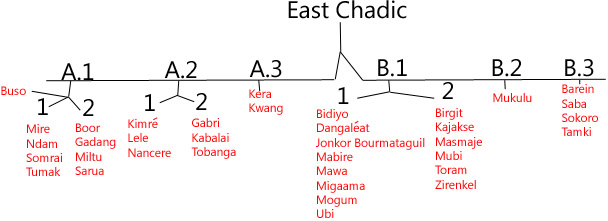
- East Chadic per Newman (1977)

The three dozen East Chadic languages of the Chadic family are spoken in Chad and Cameroon.

Speakers of various East Chadic languages are locally known as Hadjarai peoples. The largest East Chadic language is Nancere.

== Languages ==
The branches of East Chadic go either by names or by letters and numbers in an outline format.

The East Chadic B classification follows that of Lovestrand (2012).

- East Chadic
  - East Chadic A
      - (A.1.1) Sibine: Mire, Ndam, Somrai, Tumak, Motun, Mawer
      - (A.1.2) Miltu: Boor, Gadang, Miltu, Sarua
      - (A.2.1) Nancere: Nancere, Kimré, Lele
      - (A.2.2) Gabri: Gabri, Kabalai, Tobanga
    - (A.3) Kwang: Kwang, Kera
  - East Chadic B
      - (B.1.1) Dangla: Bidiyo (Bidiya), Dangaléat (Dangla), Birgit, Jonkor Bourmataguil, Mabire, Migaama, Mogum (Jegu), Toram
      - (B.1.2) Mubi: Mubi, Kajakse, Masmaje, Zirenkel (Zerenkel)
      - (B.1.3) ? Kujargé
    - (B.2) Mokilko (Mukulu, Gergiko)
    - (B.3) Sokoro: Saba, Sokoro, Tamki, Mawa, Ubi
    - (B.4) Barein (Baraïn) (including the Jalking or Jelkung dialect)

Peust (2018), however, has a somewhat different phylogenetic classification for East Chadic. The most striking change is the repositioning of Mokilko (B.2) from East Chadic B to East Chadic A, where it now constitutes the first branch to separate, followed by Lele-Nancere (A.2.1). Within East Chadic B, he treats the Mubi group (B.1.2) as the first primary branching, with all the rest forming a subgroup divided between Dangla (B.1.1) in the north and Barain plus Sokoro (B.3 and B.4) in the south.

East Chadic A is distributed primarily in Tandjilé and neighbouring regions. East Chadic B is distributed primarily in Guéra and neighbouring regions.

== Numerals ==
Comparison of numerals in individual languages:

Classification	Language	1	2	3	4	5	6	7	8	9	10
A, A.1	Somrai	mə́n	sə́r	súbù	wōdə̄	jì	kubì	wúrɡə́ súbù (4 + 3) ?	də̀ná sə́r (10–2)	də̀ná mə́n (10–1)	mwàtʃ
A, A.1	Tumak	mə̀n	hɛ̀	sùb	wōrī	ùsì	ùɡì	ɗáksùb	wāwār (2 x 4) ?	bìsāmə̄n (10–1) ?	kwàr
A, A.2	Gabri	pɔ̀n	wɔ̄	sùbū	pɔ́rbú	bày	jī	jūrɡú	mārɡə́	tə́nɡɛ̄sə́	mɔ̀tʃ
A, A.2, 1	Kimré	pɔn	wɔ	subu	pɔrbu	bai	dʒi	dʒurɡəm	marɡə	diŋɡɛsə	m^{w}ɔdʒ
A, A.2, 1	Lele	pínà	sò	súbà	pórìŋ	bày	ménèŋ	mátòlíŋ	juruɡù	célà	ɡoro
A, A.2, 1	Nancere	pə̀nà	sùwœ̀	sàb	pə̄rí	bày	mə̀nə̀	màtàl	pə̄rpə̄ndə̄	tʃélə̄	ɡùwàrə̀
A, A.3	Kera	mə́ná	ɓásí	sóópe	wááɗe	wííɗíw / suŋku mə́ná	kə́nə́kí	sééɗa	ásəɡə̀n	támbə̀là	mánhòr / suŋku ɓásí
A, A.3	Kwang (Kwong)	mɪn	ra^{i}	sɪpa^{i}	wuɗa^{i}	wiʔyɪm	sɪdəəŋ	bʊkʊr	ka^{u}da	bɪdaamna	ruko^{p}
B, B.1, 1	Bidiya (Bidiyo) (1)	ke	siɗi	subaŋ	paɗaŋ	beeyʼeŋ	peŋkeyʼ (5 + 1)	pisiɗaŋ (5 + 2)	porpoɗ (2 x 4)	peŋda	orro
B, B.1, 1	Bidiyo (Bidiya) (2)	keʔeŋ (masculine) kaɗya (feminine)	siɗì	subaŋ	paaɗaŋ	bèeʔeŋ	pénkeʔ (5 + 1)	píisit (5 + 2)	porpoɗ (2 x 4)	penda	ɔ̀rrɔ̀
B, B.1, 1	Dangla (Dangaléat)	ɾákkí	sɛ́ɛrɔ́	súbbà	pooɗí	bɛɛɗ^{y}ì	bid^{y}ɡèɗ^{y}	pɛ̀ɛ́sírà	póɗpóɗ	parkà	ɔ̀rɔ̀kì
B, B.1, 1	Mawa (1)	pəni	ɾap	sup	paːt	bij	b^{y}aːpat (5 + 1) ?	b^{y}amat	patpat (2 x 4)	k^{w}apinikara (10–1) ?	k^{w}aːjan
B, B.1, 1	Mawa (2)	pənni	rap	sup	pat	bii	biaapan (5 + 1) ?	biamat	patpat (2 x 4)	kuapinikara (10–1) ?	kuayan
B, B.1, 1	Migama (1)	káƴì	séèrà	súbbà	póoɗí	béeƴá	bízɡíƴÍ	pàysárà	póppóɗí (2 x 4)	párnàkáƴÍ (10–1)	ʔórrò
B, B.1, 1	Migama (2)	káɗyì	séèrà	súbbà	póoɗí	béeɗyá	bízɡíɗyì	pàysárà	póppóɗí (2 x 4)	pârnàkáɗyì (10 -1)	ʔôrrò
B, B.1, 1	Mogum	kɛ̀ (m), kā (f)	sɛ̀	sup	poot	bey	mik	payse	porpide	barkɛt	orrok
B, B.1, 1	Ubi	piina	muɗu	suɓa	poɗa	bɛɛja	bɛɛpɛne (5 + 1)	bɛɛmuɗu (5 + 2)	porpoɗa (2 x 4)	kojpane (litː 'koj = hand')	orok
B, B.1, 2	Mubi (1)	fíní	sìr	súɓà	fádà	bíɗyà	ìstàlà	béesír	fàrbàt	férbínì	kúrúk
B, B.1, 2	Mubi (2)	fini	sir	suba	fada	bija	istala	besir	farbad [farbat]	ferbine	kuruk
B, B.1, 2	Zerenkel	pínné	siirí	sùbbà	páɗɗá	bíƴƴá	istala	bèèsiri	paarpaɗì	paarpinò	kúrúkí
B, B.2	Mukulu	sò(ò) / só(ó)	sìré	áɗó	pìɗé	páá(t)	zóó(t)	sárá(t)	ɡéssírè	ɡéssá(t)	kòòmá(t)
B, B.3	Barein	paniŋ	sidi	subu	pudu	dawsu	dasumaniŋ (5 + 1)	dasisidi (5 + 2)	dasusubu (5 + 3)	dasumpudu (5 + 4)	kur
B, B.3	Sokoro	kéttì / ker̃í	móɗù	súbà	paʔáɗà	biʔà	bépini	bémoɗù	béʃíba	bépʌɗʌ̀	ór̃kà
