= Barh Signaka =

Department of Guéra, Chad

Coordinates: 11°03′44″N 17°56′00″E

Barh Signaka (Arabic: بحر سينياكا) is one of four departments in Guéra, a region of Chad. Its capital is Mongo.

Barh Signaka Department has a population of 118,620 (2016 survey) and 495 villages.

The Tele-Nugar Iron Mines, a UNESCO World Heritage Site, are located approximately 155 km south of Melfi.

== See also ==
- Departments of Chad
