= Laï Airport =

Airport in Chad

- IATA: LTC; ICAO: FTTH

Summary
- Airport type: Public
- Owner: Government
- Serves: Laï
- Location: Chad
- Elevation AMSL: 1,171 ft / 357 m
- Coordinates: 09°23′51.6″N 016°18′44.7″E

Map
- Location of Laï Airport in Chad

Runways
Direction	Length		Surface
Direction	ft	m	Surface
05/23	2,770	844	Grass
- Source: Landings.com

Laï Airport (IATA: LTC, ICAO: FTTH) (Arabic: مطار لادي) is a public use airport located near Laï, Tandjilé, Chad.

== See also ==
- List of airports in Chad
