= Boor language =

Endangered language spoken in Chad

Boor
- Native to: Chad
- Region: south
- Native speakers: (100 cited 1999)
- Language family: Afro-Asiatic: Chadic; East Chadic; East Chadic A; Miltu (A.1.2); Boor

Language codes
- ISO 639-3: bvf
- Glottolog: boor1242
- ELP: Boor

Boor (also known as Bwara, Damraw) is an endangered Afro-Asiatic language spoken in southern Chad. The language has fewer than 100 native speakers worldwide.

Regions where the language is spoken include southern Chad, the Bousso Subprefecture, Sarh Rural Subprefecture, and in and around the Dumraw (Dumrao) village on the north bank of the Chari River. Dumrao is approximately 15 kilometers north of Gori.

Boor was documented by Florian Lionnet, Sandrine Loncke, and Remadji Hoinathy in 2012.

Due to the locations of the regions in which the language is spoken, native speakers of Boor commonly speak the Bagirmi language as well.
