= Gadang language =

Afro-Asiatic language spoken in Chad

Gadang
- Native to: Chad
- Region: southwest
- Native speakers: (2,500 cited 1997)
- Language family: Afro-Asiatic: Chadic; East Chadic; East Chadic A; Miltu (A.1.2); Gadang

Language codes
- ISO 639-3: gdk
- Glottolog: gada1262
- ELP: Gadang

Gadang is an Afro-Asiatic language spoken in southwestern Chad.
