= Battle of Lai =

Battle during the First World War

Coordinates: 9°24′N 16°18′E

Battle of Laï
- Part of the Kamerun campaign in World War I
Date	21 August 1914
Location	Southern Chad
Result	German victory

Belligerents
France: (French Third Republic) French Equatorial Africa	Germany: German Kamerun

Commanders and leaders
(French Third Republic) Cap. Jeanjean	(German Empire) Cap. Von Duhring

Strength
Unknown	Unknown

Casualties and losses
14 killed (1 lieutenant, 13 soldiers)	11 killed

The Battle of Laï began on 21 August 1914 in Chad, during the First World War at the village of Laï, capital of the district of Logone, on the Logone River in the south.

A German column from Kamerun, led by Captain Von Duhring, attacked the village of Laï, defended by Captain Jeanjean. After a bitter fight, the French were driven out and the village was occupied by the Germans until 1 September 1914.

== Sources ==
- Malval, J.; Tubiana, M. J. (1974). Essai de chronologie tchadienne, 1707–1940 (in French). Paris: Éditions du Centre national de la recherche scientifique. ISBN 2-22201-625-8.
- Moberly, F. J. (1931). Military Operations Togoland and the Cameroons 1914–1916. History of the Great War Based on Official Documents by Direction of the Historical Section of the Committee of Imperial Defence (Battery Press 1995 ed.). London: HMSO. ISBN 0-89839-235-7.
