= Guéra (department) =

Department of Guéra, Chad

Coordinates: 12°10′58″N 18°41′05″E

Guéra (Arabic: قيرا) is one of four departments in Guéra, a region of Chad. Its capital is Melfi.

Guéra Department has a population of 110,877 (2016 survey) and 192 villages.

== See also ==
- Departments of Chad
