= Mongo, Chad =

Mongo مونقو
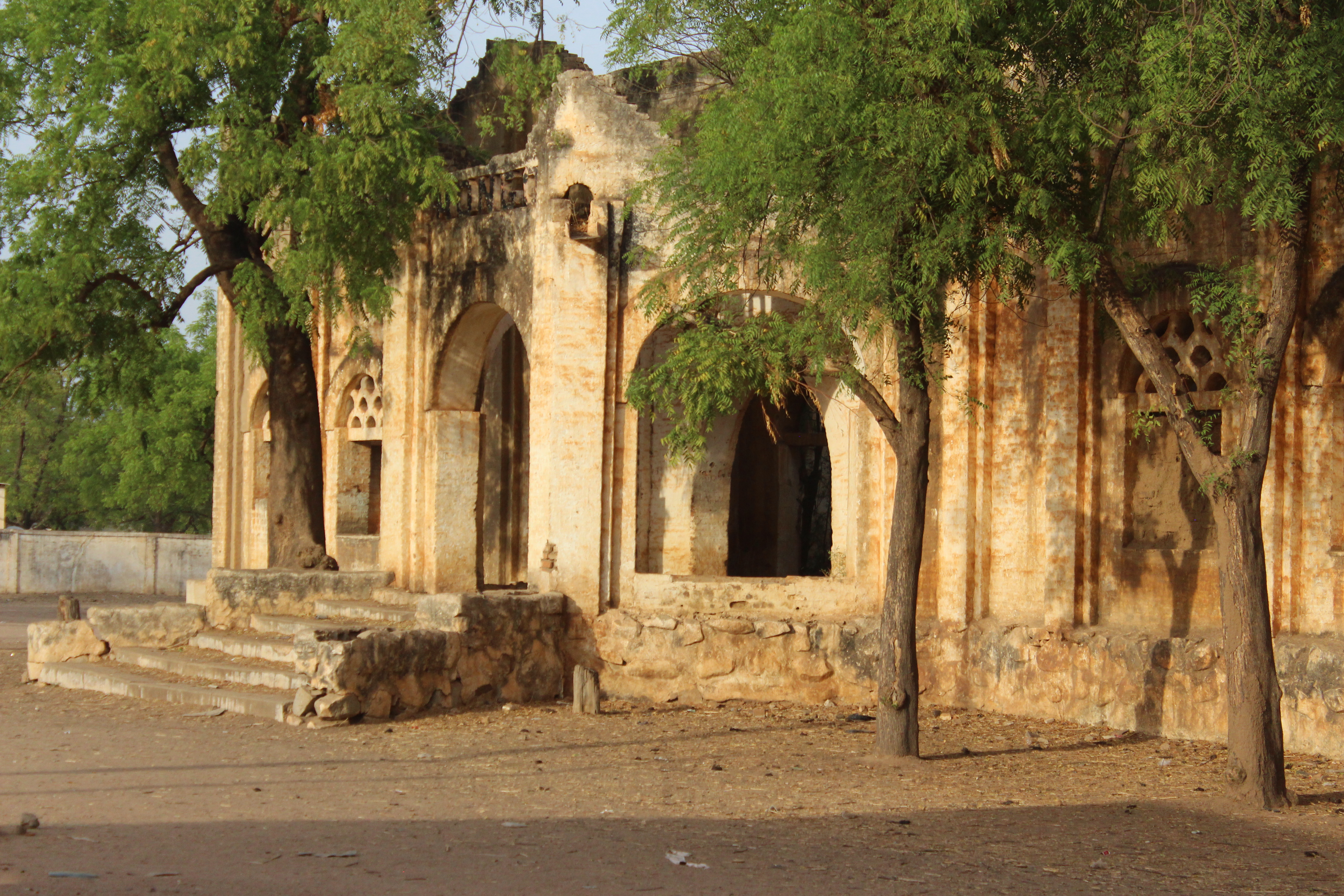

- Location in Chad
- Coordinates: 12°10′58″N 18°41′05″E
- Country: Chad
- Region: Guéra Region
- Department: Guéra Department
- Sub-Prefecture: Mongo
- Elevation: 404 m (1,325 ft)

Population (2012)
  - Total: 40,233
- Time zone: UTC+1 (WAT)

Mongo (Arabic: مونقو, Mūnqū) is a city and sub-prefecture in Chad, the capital of the region of Guéra. Located in the northern part of the region, it lies 252.2 miles (406 km) by road east of the capital N'Djamena. It is served by Mongo Airport.

On 11 April 2006, rebels of the United Front for Democratic Change (FUC) took the central city.

== Climate ==
Climate data for Mongo (1961-1990)
Month	Jan	Feb	Mar	Apr	May	Jun	Jul	Aug	Sep	Oct	Nov	Dec	Year
Mean daily maximum °C (°F)	33.1 (91.6)	35.6 (96.1)	39.0 (102.2)	38.7 (101.7)	38.6 (101.5)	35.0 (95.0)	31.9 (89.4)	29.6 (85.3)	32.0 (89.6)	34.4 (93.9)	33.6 (92.5)	31.2 (88.2)	34.4 (93.9)
Mean daily minimum °C (°F)	17.6 (63.7)	20.6 (69.1)	24.5 (76.1)	26.8 (80.2)	26.4 (79.5)	24.5 (76.1)	22.7 (72.9)	21.7 (71.1)	21.9 (71.4)	21.8 (71.2)	19.7 (67.5)	17.8 (64.0)	22.2 (71.9)
Average rainfall mm (inches)	0.0 (0.0)	0.0 (0.0)	2.0 (0.08)	11.7 (0.46)	34.2 (1.35)	88.8 (3.50)	172.0 (6.77)	241.3 (9.50)	103.1 (4.06)	27.7 (1.09)	0.9 (0.04)	0.0 (0.0)	681.7 (26.85)
Average rainy days (≥ 0.1 mm)	0	0	1	3	6	9	14	15	12	3	1	0	64
Source: WMO

== Demographics ==
Mongo city demographics:

Year	Population
1993	21,443
2008	29,261
2012	40,233

=== By canton ===
Ethnic composition by canton in 2016 for the sub-prefecture of Mongo:

Migami Canton (population: 47,665; villages: 43):

Ethnic group	Linguistic affiliation	Percentage
Migami	East Chadic	95
Arab	Semitic	3
Ouaddai	Semitic	2

Dadjo 1 Canton (population: 25,208; villages: 50):

Ethnic group	Linguistic affiliation	Percentage
Daju	Daju	90
Arab	Semitic	6
Kuka	Bagirmi	4

Oyo Canton (population: 11,449; villages: 14):

Ethnic group	Linguistic affiliation	Percentage
Arab	Semitic	90
Tunkul	Semitic	7
Bidio	East Chadic	3

== Schools ==
Less than half of girls in Mongo go to primary school, and less than 5% of girls in the region make it to secondary school. More boys than girls go to school in Mongo.
