= Déressia =

- Location in Chad (Tandjilé Region highlighted)
- Coordinates: 09°45′37″N 16°16′11″E
- Country: Chad
- Region: Tandjilé
- Department: Tandjilé Est
- Sub-Prefecture: Déressia

Population (2009)
  - Total: 50,113
- Time zone: +1

Déressia is a settlement in the Tandjilé region of Chad, situated 285 km (177 mi) southeast of N'Djamena. In 2009, the population of Déressia was 50,113, which included 24,173 males and 25,940 females. Déressia is classified by Köppen-Geiger climate classification system as tropical savanna climate (Aw).
