= Sara Gambai people =

Ethnic group in Chad

The Sara Gambai are an ethnic group in Chad. The Sara Gambai live in the southern parts of Chad. They speak Ngambay, a Nilo-Saharan language; it is a trade language and is the largest of the Sara languages. Most are non-Muslim. The Sara Gambai are a sub-group of the Sara people. Other subgroups of the Sara include the Sar, Mbay, Kaba, Gulay, and Dai. The population of this sub-group possibly exceeds 1,000,000.
