= Barein language =

Chadic language of south central Chad

Barein
- Native to: Chad
- Region: south central
- Native speakers: (4,100 cited 1993 census)
- Language family: Afro-Asiatic: Chadic; East Chadic; East Chadic B; Sokoro (B.3); Barein

Language codes
- ISO 639-3: bva
- Glottolog: bara1406
- ELP: Barain

Barein (also referred to as Baraïn, Barayin, Guilia, Jalkia or Jalkiya) is a Chadic language spoken in south central Chad.

Baraïn is spoken by 6,000 people living in 30 to 40 villages around Melfi in the Guéra region of southern Chad. Its main dialects are not mutually comprehensible, with speakers having to resort to Chadian Arabic in order to communicate with each other.

- Jalkiya and Giliya (geographically and linguistically very close)
- Jalking (Sakaya)
- Komiya

== Writing System ==
Barein alphabet
a	b	d	e	g	i	j	k	l	m	n	n̰	ŋ	o	p	r	s	t	u	w	y
