= Mawa language =

Afro-Asiatic language spoken in Chad

Mawa
- Mahoua
- Native to: Chad
- Region: central
- Native speakers: (6,600 cited 2000)
- Language family: Afro-Asiatic: Chadic; East Chadic; East Chadic B; Sokoro (B.3); Mawa
- Writing system: Latin

Language codes
- ISO 639-3: mcw
- Glottolog: mawa1270

Mawa (also known as Mahwa, Mahoua) is an Afro-Asiatic language spoken in central Chad.
