= Southern Gabri language =

Chadic dialect cluster of Chad

Gabri
- Southern Gabri
- Native to: Chad
- Native speakers: (34,000 cited 2000)
- Language family: Afro-Asiatic: Chadic; East Chadic; East Chadic A; Gabri languages (A.2.2); Gabri
- Dialects: Buruwa; Darbe; Moonde

Language codes
- ISO 639-3: gab
- Glottolog: gabr1253

Gabri, sometimes disambiguated from related languages also called "Gabri" as Southern Gabri, is an East Chadic dialect cluster spoken in the Tandjilé Region of Chad. The principal varieties are Buruwa, Darbe (Dormon), and Moonde.
