= Laï =

Laï لادي
- Location in Chad
- Coordinates: 9°24′0″N 16°18′0″E
- Country: Chad
- Region: Tandjile Region
- Department: Tandjile Est
- Sub-Prefecture: Laï

Population (2008)
  - Total: 20 428
- Time zone: UTC+01:00 (WAT)

Laï (Arabic: لادي) is a city in Chad. It lies on the Logone River and is the capital of the region of Tandjilé. The town is served by Laï Airport.

== History ==
This city is notable for the Battle of Lai during World War I; in August 1914 the city was occupied by the German army until it was liberated by the French in September.

== Demographics ==
Year	Population
1993	14 272
2008	20 428

== Notable people ==
- Ahmat Acyl, militia leader during the Chadian Civil War
