= Tobanga language =

East Chadic language of Chad

Tobanga
- Northern Gabri
- Native to: Chad
- Native speakers: (30,000 cited 1999)
- Language family: Afro-Asiatic: Chadic; East Chadic; East Chadic A; Gabri (A.2.2); Tobanga

Language codes
- ISO 639-3: tng
- Glottolog: toba1280

Tobanga, or Northern Gabri, is an East Chadic language spoken in the Tandjilé Region of Chad.
