= Idriss Miskine =

Chadian politician and diplomat

Idriss Miskine (15 March 1948 – 7 January 1984) was a Chadian politician and diplomat under Presidents Félix Malloum and Hissène Habré.

== Career ==
Miskine, an ethnic Hadjarai, was the Minister of Transport, Posts, and Telecommunications under President Malloum until joining Habré's opposition Armed Forces of the North (FAN) movement in 1979. Upon FAN's capture of the capital N'Djamena in June 1982, Miskine became Foreign Minister. He died in January 1984 shortly before peace talks were set to begin in Addis Ababa.

== Sources ==
- Profile on rulers.org

Preceded by Acyl Ahmat Akhbach	Foreign Minister of Chad; 1982-1984	Succeeded by Korom Ahmad
