= Ubi language =

East Chadic language in Chad

Ubi
- Native to: Chad
- Region: central
- Native speakers: (1,100 cited 1995)
- Language family: Afro-Asiatic: Chadic; East Chadic; East Chadic B; Dangla (B.1.1); Ubi

Language codes
- ISO 639-3: ubi
- Glottolog: ubii1238
- ELP: Ubi
- Ubi is classified as Severely Endangered by the UNESCO Atlas of the World's Languages in Danger.

Ubi (also known as Oubi) is an Afro-Asiatic language spoken in Guéra region, Chad.
