= Masmaje language =

Afro-Asiatic language of central Chad

Masmaje
- Native to: Chad
- Region: central
- Ethnicity: 45,000 (2019)
- Language family: Afro-Asiatic: Chadic; East Chadic; East Chadic B; Mubi (B.1.2); Masmaje

Language codes
- ISO 639-3: mes
- Glottolog: masm1239

Masmaje (also known as Masmadje, Mesmedje) is an Afro-Asiatic language spoken in central Chad. There are speakers in Moubi Hadaba Canton, Bitchotchi Sub-prefecture.
