= Tamki language =

Afro-Asiatic language of central Chad

Tamki
- Native to: Chad
- Region: central
- Native speakers: (500 cited 1999)
- Language family: Afro-Asiatic: Chadic; East Chadic; East Chadic B; Sokoro (B.3); Tamki

Language codes
- ISO 639-3: tax
- Glottolog: tamk1242
- ELP: Tamki

Tamki (also known as Temki) is an Afro-Asiatic language spoken in central Chad.
