= Kélo, Chad =

Kélo كيلو
- City
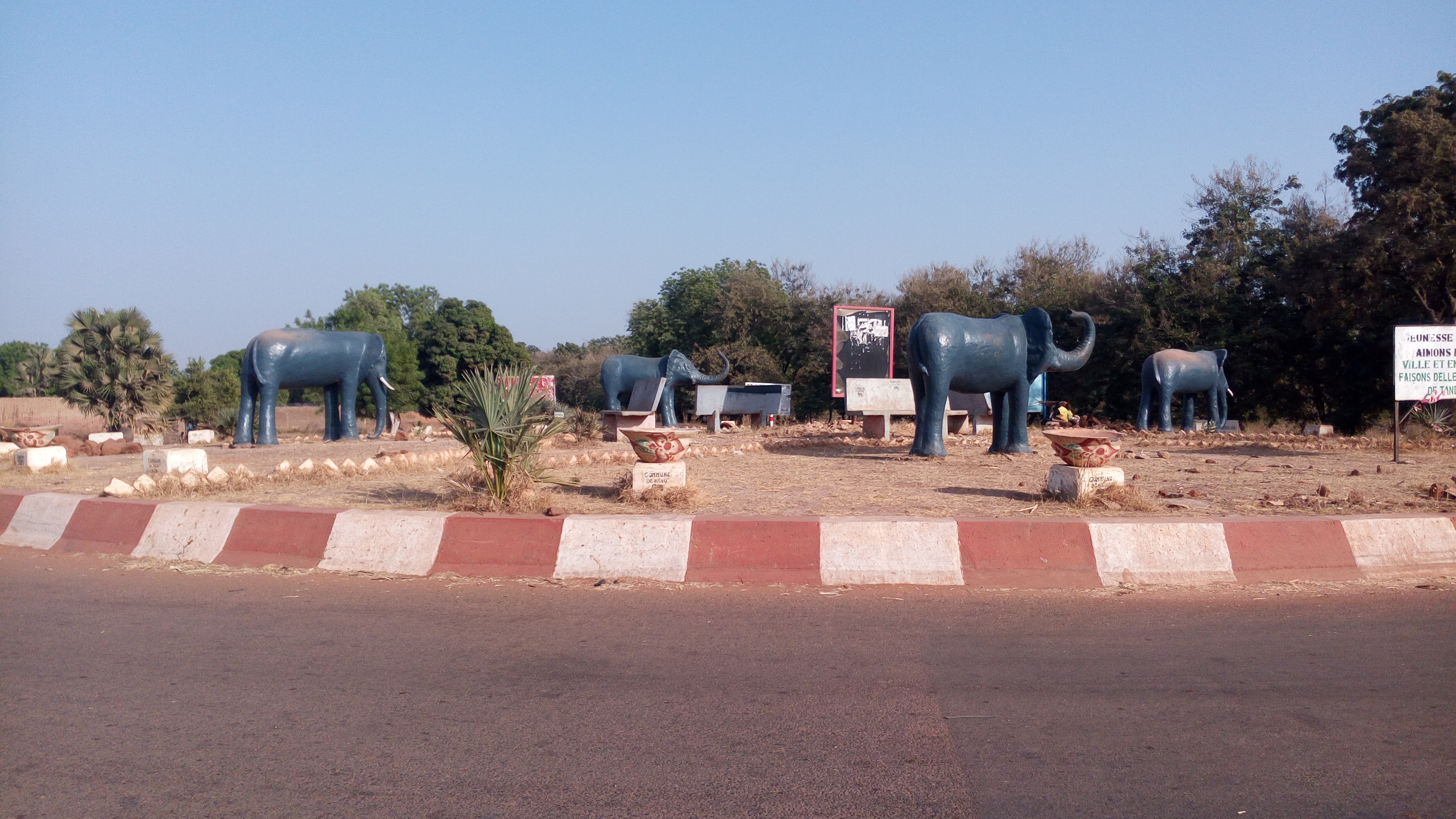
- View of Kélo

- Location in Chad
- Coordinates: 9°18′36″N 15°48′36″E
- Country: Chad
- Region: Tandjile Region
- Department: Tandjile Ouest
- Sub-Prefecture: Kélo
- Elevation: 427 m (1,401 ft)

Population (2012)
  - Total: 45,224
- Time zone: UTC+01:00 (WAT)

Kélo (Arabic: كيلو) is a city in southwest Chad, its fifth largest city by population. It is also the capital of the department of Tandjilé Ouest.

== Demographics ==
| Year | Populating |
|---|---|
| 1993 | 31,319 |
| 2008 | 44,828 |
