= Tumak, Astrakhan Oblast =

Tumak Тумак
- Selo
- Location within Astrakhan Oblast Location within Russia
- Coordinates: 46°14′N 48°30′E
- Country: Russia
- Region: Astrakhan Oblast
- District: Volodarsky District
- Time zone: UTC+4:00

Tumak (Russian: Тумак) is a rural locality (a selo) and the administrative center of Tumaksky Selsoviet of Volodarsky District, Astrakhan Oblast, Russia. The population was 2,539 as of 2010. There are 19 streets.

== Geography ==
Tumak is located 25 km (16 mi) south of Volodarsky (the district's administrative centre) by road. Sizy Bugor is the nearest rural locality.
