= Baro, Chad =

Coordinates: 12°12′N 18°58′E

Baro
- Sub-prefecture
- Location in Chad
- Country: Chad

Baro is a sub-prefecture of Guéra Region in Chad.
