= Kwang language =

Chadic language spoken in Chad

Kwang
- Buso
- Native to: Chad
- Native speakers: (17,000 cited 1993 census)
- Language family: Afro-Asiatic: Chadic; East Chadic; East Chadic A; Kwang–Kera (A.3); Kwang

Language codes
- ISO 639-3: Either: kvi – Kwang bso – Buso
- Glottolog: kwan1285
- ELP: Buso

Kwang (also known as Kwong) is an East Chadic language of Chad.

== Documentation ==
Surveys and other documentation work have been done by Nodjibogoto et al. A description of Kwang was published by Jungraithmayr & Peust in 2023.

== Dialects ==
Dialects are Mobu, Ngam, and Cagin.
