= Kimré language =

East Chadic language of Chad

Kimré
- Gabri
- Native to: Chad
- Native speakers: 20,000 (2007)
- Language family: Afro-Asiatic: Chadic; East Chadic; East Chadic A; Nancere (A.2.1); Kimré

Language codes
- ISO 639-3: kqp
- Glottolog: kimr1241

Kimré is an East Chadic language spoken in the Tandjilé Region of Chad. Like most related languages, it is popularly called both "Kimre" and "Gabri".
