= Mabire language =

Endangered Afro-Asiatic language of Chad

Mabire
- Native to: Chad
- Region: Guéra Province
- Extinct: early 2010s
- Language family: Afro-Asiatic: Chadic; East Chadic; East Chadic B; Dangla (B.1.1); Mabire

Language codes
- ISO 639-3: muj
- Glottolog: mabi1242
- ELP: Mabire

Mabire is an extinct Afro-Asiatic language spoken in Oulek village in Chad.

== Speakers ==
As of a report published in 2001, there were three living speakers of Mabire, two of whom were an elderly brother and sister, named Terab and Balha, living in Oulek. The third speaker, Souleymane Dabanga, was the chief of the Mabire and lived in Katch.

== Classification ==
The Mabire language belongs to the Dangla group of Eastern Chadic, along with Dangaleat (Dangla) and Migaama (Migama).

== Decline ==
Fifty years ago, the Mabire lived in four large villages near Mount Mabire. These villages were Amdjaména, Arga, Mambire. The community disbanded following an epidemic, with the survivors assimilating into neighboring speech communities.
