= Nancere language =

East Chadic language of Chad

Nancere
- Nangjere
- Native to: Chad
- Native speakers: 144,000 (2019)
- Language family: Afro-Asiatic: Chadic; East Chadic; East Chadic A; Nancere languages (A.2.1); Nancere
- Dialects: Mire; Bolo; Kwale
- Writing system: Latin

Language codes
- ISO 639-3: nnc
- Glottolog: nanc1253

Nancere (Nanjeri) is an East Chadic language spoken in the Tandjilé Region of Chad.
