= Sarua language =

Afro-Asiatic language spoken in Chad

Sarua
- Native to: Chad
- Region: southwest
- Native speakers: (2,000 cited 1997)
- Language family: Afro-Asiatic: Chadic; East Chadic; East Chadic A; Miltu (A.1.2); Sarua

Language codes
- ISO 639-3: swy
- Glottolog: saru1245
- ELP: Sarwa

Sarua (also known as Sarwa, Saroua) is an Afro-Asiatic language spoken in southwestern Chad.
