= Mogum language =

Afro-Asiatic language spoken in Chad

Mogum
- Native to: Chad
- Region: south central
- Native speakers: (7,000 cited 1997)
- Language family: Afro-Asiatic: Chadic; East Chadic; East Chadic B; Dangla (B.1.1); Mogum

Language codes
- ISO 639-3: mou
- Glottolog: mogu1251

Mogum or Mogoum is an Afro-Asiatic language spoken in south central Chad. Speakers are found in Sorki canton in Chinguil sub-prefecture.
