= Melfi, Chad =

Melfi ملفي
- Location in Chad
- Coordinates: 11°3′35″N 17°55′59″E
- Country: Chad
- Region: Guéra Region
- Time zone: UTC+1 (WAT)

Melfi (Arabic: ملفي) is a town in the Guéra Region of southern-central Chad.

The Tele-Nugar Iron Mines, a UNESCO World Heritage Site, are located approximately 155 km south of Melfi.

== Demographics ==
Ethnic composition by canton in 2016:

Gogmi Canton (population: 15,917; villages: 63):

Ethnic group	Linguistic affiliation	Percentage
Sokoro	East Chadic	75
Arab	Semitic	15
Fulbe	Senegambian	10

Melfi Canton (population: 23,700; villages: 104):

Ethnic group	Linguistic affiliation	Percentage
Dayakhire	?	70
Barain	East Chadic	20
Fulbe	Senegambian	10

== Transport ==
The town is served by Melfi Airport.
