= Toram language =

Afro-Asiatic language of Chad

Toram
- Native to: Chad
- Region: central
- Native speakers: (8,500 cited 2000)
- Language family: Afro-Asiatic: Chadic; East Chadic; East Chadic B; Mubi (B.1.2); Toram

Language codes
- ISO 639-3: trj
- Glottolog: tora1267
- ELP: Toram

Toram (also known as Torom and Torum) is an Afro-Asiatic language spoken in central Chad. Speakers have shifted to Chadian Arabic.
