= Zirenkel language =

Afro-Asiatic language spoken in Chad

Zirenkel
- Native to: Chad
- Native speakers: (2,200 cited 1993 census)
- Language family: Afro-Asiatic: Chadic; East Chadic; East Chadic B; Mubi (B.1.2); Zirenkel

Language codes
- ISO 639-3: zrn
- Glottolog: zire1244
- ELP: Zirenkel

Zirenkel is an Afro-Asiatic language spoken in Chad.
