= Kera language =

Chadic language of Chad and Cameroon

Kera
- Tuburi
- Native to: Chad, Cameroon
- Region: Cameroon: Mayo-Danay, Diamaré
- Native speakers: (50,000 cited 1993)
- Language family: Afro-Asiatic: Chadic; East Chadic; East Chadic A; Kwang (A.3); Kera

Language codes
- ISO 639-3: ker
- Glottolog: kera1255

Kera is an East Chadic language spoken by 45,000 people in Southwest Chad and 6,000 people in North Cameroon.

It was called "Tuburi" by Joseph Greenberg, a name shared with Tupuri.

In Cameroon, Kera is spoken by small, isolated and scattered groups in the southern departments of Mayo-Danay (Wina commune) and Diamaré (Ndoukoula district) in the Far North Region. It is mainly spoken in Chad. In Cameroon, the main group is near the border, south of Viri. There are about 6,000 speakers in Cameroon.

== Phonology ==
=== Consonants ===
Consonants
		Labial	Alveolar	Palatal	Velar	Glottal
Nasal		m	n		ŋ	
Plosive	voiceless	p	t	tʃ	k	ʔ
Plosive	voiced	b	d	dʒ	ɡ	
Plosive	implosive	ɓ	ɗ			
Fricative	voiceless	f	s			h
Fricative	voiced	v	z			
Approximant		w	l	j		
Flap		ⱱ	ɾ			

==== Labiodental flap ====
Kera has a labiodental flap /ⱱ/, a rare sound attested in only 80 languages of the world. Out of the 60 or so words that contain this consonant, 95% of them are ideophones, words which embody the senses of their meaning. Near-minimal pairs between the labiodental flap and the labiodental fricative /v/ exist: /vìw/ 'hearing something pass by' and /ⱱīw/ 'see something pass quickly'.

=== Vowels ===
Kera has six contrastive vowels. In closed syllables, the mid and low vowels will undergo raising. Kera also has phonemic tones, whereby a change in pitch alone may differentiate words.

	front	central	back
high	i	ɨ	u
mid	e ~ ɛ		o ~ ɔ
low	a ~ ə		

==== Harmony ====
Kera has several types vowel harmony:

1. High vowels in both the root and suffix will spread and replace other vowels within the word in both directions. This is notable, as it is rare for languages to have high vowels be the dominant ones in vowel harmony systems.
2. Vowels in suffixes force the central vowel of the root to have the same degree of frontness and rounding.
3. There are several contexts which cause total harmony within the root (i.e. the vowel is wholly copied). These contexts include: word-final consonant-vowel syllables, the historical affixes -a and -a, and the epenthetic vowel -i following obstruents.

=== Phonotactics ===
==== Clusters ====
Kera allows almost all consonants to appear at the end of a syllable in word-medial position. However, at the end of a word as a whole, only the sonorants /l, w, j/ can occur. When a non-sonorant sound occurs at the end of a word, the vowel [i] is added at the end to avoid breaking this rule.

Kera's syllables are relatively simple. It allows for a consonant to be followed by a long or short vowel and may take an extra coda consonant at the end. The initial consonant is optional in all cases. Additionally, there are several phonological rules at play that prevent consonant-vowel-consonant-vowel sequences from being possible. For example, the hypothetical words *[nèlɛ̀] and *[fɛ́lɛ] are phonotactically impossible in Kera. To prevent these sequences from occurring, Kera will either lengthen the final vowel [nèlɛ̀ɛ], or remove the final vowel [fɛ́l].

== Grammar ==
Kera is a subject–verb–object language, using prepositions. It uses exclusively borderline case-marking.
