= Bagirmi people =

Ethnic group in Chad

Bagirmi
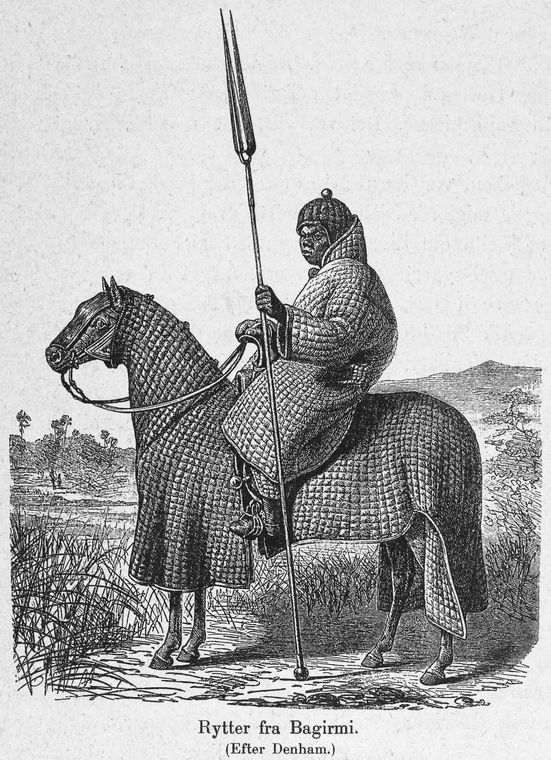

Total population
- c. 70,000

Regions with significant populations
- Chad

Languages
- Bagirmi, Fula, Chadian Arabic

Religion
- Islam

Related ethnic groups
- Sara people, other Central Sudanic peoples

The Bagirmi (also spelled "Baguirmi") or Barma are a Central African ethnic group who inhabit the Chari-Baguirmi region of Chad. They are one of Chad's major ethnic groups.

== Social structure ==
=== Language ===
The Bagirmi mostly speak the Bagirmi language as their native language, although some of them speak Fula or Chadian Arabic instead.

=== Religion ===
Their main religion is Islam. Islam was introduced to the Bagirmi by the start of the 17th century, however it never fully replaced their traditional beliefs. Sufi orders such as the Tijaniyyah and to a smaller extent, the Sanusiyya, led to further conversions and the consolidation of Islam among of the Bagirmi.

=== Government ===
Bagirmi society has a royal family and their king is known as mbang, a tradition that dates back to the Sultanate of Bagirmi.

=== Economy ===
The Bagirmi mainly cultivate sorghum and millet and raise cattle, chickens, goats and sheep.

== See also ==
- Sultanate of Bagirmi
- Bagirmi language

== Notable Bagirmi ==
- Abd ar-Rahman Gaourang II
