= Kabalai language =

Afro-Asiatic language spoken in Chad

Kabalai
- Kaba Lai
- Native to: Chad
- Region: central
- Native speakers: (18,000 cited 1993 census)
- Language family: Afro-Asiatic: Chadic; East Chadic; East Chadic A; Gabri (A.2.2); Kabalai

Language codes
- ISO 639-3: kvf
- Glottolog: kaba1292
- ELP: Kabalai

Kabalai (Kaba Lai) is Afro-Asiatic language spoken in southwest Chad.
