= Tandjilé Ouest =

Department of Chad

Coordinates: 9°18′36″N 15°48′36″E

Tandjilé Ouest is one of two departments in Tandjilé, a region in Chad. Its capital is Kélo.

== See also ==
- Departments of Chad
