= Ngambay language =

Nilo-Saharan language spoken in Chad, Cameroon and Nigeria

Ngambay
- Gambaye
- Native to: Chad, Cameroon, Nigeria
- Ethnicity: Sara
- Native speakers: 1.38 million (2005–2013)
- Language family: Nilo-Saharan?: Central Sudanic; Bongo–Bagirmi; Sara languages; West; Ngambay
- Writing system: Latin

Language codes
- ISO 639-3: sba
- Glottolog: ngam1268

Ngambay (also known as Sara, Sara Ngambai, Gamba, Gambaye, Gamblai and Ngambai) is one of the major languages spoken by Sara people in southwestern Chad, northeastern Cameroon and eastern Nigeria, with about a million native speakers. Ngambay is the most widely spoken of the Sara languages, and is used as a trade language between speakers of other dialects. It is spoken by the Sara Gambai people.

Ngambay has Subject–Verb–Object word order. Suffixes indicate case. There is no tense; aspect is indicated by a perfective–imperfective distinction. Modifiers follow nouns. The numeral system is decimal, but eight and nine are expressed as 10-minus-two and 10-minus-one. It is a tone language with three tones: high, mid, and low. There are loan words from both Arabic and French.

== Phonology ==
=== Consonants ===
		Labial	Alveolar	Palatal	Labial- velar	Velar
Plosive	voiceless	p	t			k
Plosive	voiced	b	d	dʒ		ɡ
Plosive	implosive	ɓ	ɗ			
Plosive	prenasalized	ᵐb	ⁿd	ⁿd͡ʒ		ᵑɡ
Nasal		m	n	ɲ		
Fricative			s			
Trill/Flap		ⱱ	r			
Lateral			l			
Approximant				j	w	

=== Vowels/Nasal Vowels ===
	Front	Central	Back
Close	i ĩ		u ũ
Close-mid	ɛ ɛ̃	ə	o õ
Open-mid	ɛ ɛ̃	ə	ɔ ɔ̃
Open		a ã	

==== Tones & Nasalization ====
The three tones are high /á/, mid /ā/ and low /à/. Vowels can also be nasalised: /ã/.
