= Mubi language =

Afro-Asiatic language of central Chad

Mubi
- Native to: Chad
- Region: central
- Native speakers: (35,000 cited 1993 census)
- Language family: Afro-Asiatic: Chadic; East Chadic; East Chadic B; Mubi languages (B.1.2); Mubi

Language codes
- ISO 639-3: mub
- Glottolog: mubi1246

Mubi (also known as Moubi) is an Afro-Asiatic language spoken in central Chad. It forms one of the Mubi languages, a group of East Chadic languages.

Mubi speakers comprise the majority of the population of Mangalmé Department.
