= Mokilko language =

Chadic language spoken in central Chad

Mokilko
- Gergiko
- Native to: Chad
- Region: central
- Native speakers: (12,000 cited 1990)
- Language family: Afro-Asiatic: Chadic; East Chadic; East Chadic B; Mokilko

Language codes
- ISO 639-3: moz
- Glottolog: muku1242

Mokilko, or Mukulu (also known as Gergiko, Guerguiko, Mokulu, Mokoulou, Djonkor Guera, Dyongor Guera, Diongor Guera, Jonkor-Gera), is a Chadic language spoken in central Chad. The local name for the language is Gergiko (or Guerguiko in the French orthography). This is the name used for mother-tongue literacy materials. Mukulu is the name of a village.
