= Migaama language =

Afro-Asiatic language spoken in Chad

Migaama
- Native to: Chad
- Region: central
- Native speakers: (20,000 cited 2000)
- Language family: Afro-Asiatic: Chadic; East Chadic; East Chadic B; Dangla (B.1.1); Migaama

Language codes
- ISO 639-3: mmy
- Glottolog: miga1249

Migaama (also known as Migama, Jongor, Djonkor, Dionkor, Dyongor, Djonkor About Telfane) is an Afro-Asiatic language spoken in central Chad. Speakers make up the majority of the population of Baro, Chad.
