= Ndam language =

Afro-Asiatic language spoken in Chad

Ndam
- Native to: Chad
- Region: Southwest
- Native speakers: (6,500 cited 1990 census)
- Language family: Afro-Asiatic: Chadic; East Chadic; East Chadic A; Sibine (A.1.1); Ndam

Language codes
- ISO 639-3: ndm
- Glottolog: ndam1251
- ELP: Ndam

Ndam, also known as Dam and Ndamm, is an Afro-Asiatic language spoken in the southwestern Chadian prefectures of Tandjilé and Lai. Most of the speakers generally practice traditional religions, Islam, or Christianity. There are two dialects of Ndam—northern and southern, respectively—Ndam Dik, and Ndam-Ndam.
