= Saba language =

Afro-Asiatic language of Chad

Saba
- Native to: Chad
- Region: south central
- Native speakers: (1,300, including Jelkung cited 2000)
- Language family: Afro-Asiatic: Chadic; East Chadic; East Chadic B; Sokoro (B.3); Saba

Language codes
- ISO 639-3: saa
- Glottolog: saba1276
- ELP: Saba

Saba is an Afro-Asiatic language spoken in south central Chad. Speakers are found in Sorki canton in Chinguil sub-prefecture.

Ethnologue lists Jelkung as a synonym; Blench (2006), however, considers it a distinct language, in a different branch of East Chadic.
