= Tumak language =

Chadic language spoken in Chad

Tumak
- Native to: Chad
- Region: Southwest
- Native speakers: (25,000 cited 1993 census)
- Language family: Afro-Asiatic: Chadic; East Chadic; East Chadic A; Sibine (A.1.1); Tumak
- Dialects: Tumak; Motun; Mawer

Language codes
- ISO 639-3: tmc
- Glottolog: tuma1260

Tumak, also known as Toumak, Tumag, Tummok, Sara Toumak, Tumac, and Dije, is an Afro-Asiatic language spoken in the southwestern Chadian prefectures of Moyen-Chari and Koumra. Motun (Mod) and Tumak dialects have a lexical similarity of only 70%; Blench (2006) lists Tumak, Motun, and Mawer as separate languages. Most Motun speakers use some Sara.

The "Gulei" listed in Greenberg might be a dialect of Tumak.

== Phonology ==
Consonants
	Labial	Alveolar	Palatal	Velar	Glottal
Plosive	p b	t d	dʒ	k g	
Prenasalized	ᵐb	ⁿd	ⁿdʒ	ᵑg	
Implosive	ɓ	ɗ			
Fricative		s			h
Nasal	m	n	ɲ	ŋ	
Approximant	w	r, ɽ, l	j		

Vowels
	Front	Central	Back
High	i iː		u uː
Mid-high	e eː	ə əː	o oː
Mid-low	ɛ		ɔ ɔː
Low		a aː	

Tumak also has two tones; high and low.
