= Jonkor language =

Afro-Asiatic language of Chad

Jonkor Bourmataguil
- Native to: Chad
- Region: Salamat Prefecture
- Native speakers: (1,500 cited 1993)
- Language family: Afro-Asiatic: Chadic; East Chadic; East Chadic B; Dangla (B.1.1); Jonkor Bourmataguil

Language codes
- ISO 639-3: jeu
- Glottolog: jonk1238
- ELP: Jonkor Bourmataguil

Jonkor Bourmataguil (also known as Djongor Bourmataguil, Dougne, Karakir) is an Afro-Asiatic language spoken in Chad.
