= Jaya language =

Bongo–Bagirmi language of Chad

Jaya
- Native to: Chad
- Native speakers: (2,200 cited 1993 census)
- Language family: Nilo-Saharan?: Central Sudanic; Bongo–Bagirmi; Bagirmi; Jaya

Language codes
- ISO 639-3: jyy
- Glottolog: jaya1242
- ELP: Jaya

Jaya is a Bongo–Bagirmi language of Chad.
