= Bagirmi language =

Nilo-Saharan language of Chad and Nigeria

Bagirmi
- tàrà ɓármà
- Native to: Chad, Nigeria
- Ethnicity: Bagirmi
- Native speakers: (45,000 in Chad cited 1993 census)
- Language family: Nilo-Saharan?: Central Sudanic; Bongo–Bagirmi; Bagirmi; Bagirmi

Language codes
- ISO 639-3: bmi
- Glottolog: bagi1246

Bagirmi (also Baguirmi; autonym: tàrà ɓármà) is the language of the Bagirmi people of Chad belonging to the Central Sudanic family, which has been tenatively classified as part of the Nilo-Saharan superfamily. It was spoken by 44,761 people in 1993, mainly in the Chari-Baguirmi Region, as well as in Mokofi sub-prefecture of Guéra Region. It was the language of the Sultanate of Bagirmi (1522-1871) and then the Wadai Empire before the Scramble for Africa.

During the 1990s, Bagirmi was given written form and texts providing basic literacy instruction were composed through the efforts of Don and Orpha Raun, Christian missionaries of the Church of the Lutheran Brethren of America, late in their Chadian careers. In 2003, Anthony Kimball developed a font to support the Bagirmi alphabet and a Keyman input method for Latin keyboards, and the body of published Baguirmi literature continues to expand. The majority of this literature was distributed in Chad by David Raun, a missionary and the son of Don and Orpha Raun, at a token cost as a service to the Bagirmi-speaking peoples of Chad.

== Phonology ==
=== Consonants ===
The consonant table presented below contains sounds which are supposed to be native to Bagirmi. The sounds f, v, z, ʃ and h are heard in loan-words.

Consonant table
	Bilabial	Dental	Retroflex	Sibilant	Palatal	Velar	Labio velar	Laryngeal
Explosive	p, b	t, d	t, d		c, j	k, g		
Implosive	'b		'd		'j('y), 'ny			
Nasal	m	n			ny	ŋ		
Fricative	(ʄ)			s, z				
Liquids etc.			r, l		y		w	

The sounds given in brackets are variants (not specific phonemes).

=== Vowels ===
Vowel chart
	Front	Central	Back
Close	i I	ö	u U
Close-mid	e	ä	o
Open-mid	ɛ	a	ɔ
Open			

- i-vowel (i, I) is similar to the vowel in English "feet", I - in "fit". Their using depends on position and context. Being pronounced in isolation i-vowel appears in monosyllables and polysyllables. Also it could be found before ny.

si - milk
ji - hand
ri -name

- u-vowel (u, U) is similar to the vowel in English "pool" (U - in "pull"). Accordingly to position, the distribution of u-vowels is parallel.7

lua - year
mʷu - grass
tut(u) - dry

- e-vowel (e, ɛ) is close to the English vowel in "bed". Sometimes e-vowel cannot be distinguished from ɛ clearly. Words with e-vowels are more common than with ɛ.

deb(e) - person
tej(e) - honey
gèl(e) - lefthand

- o-vowel (o, ɔ): o is more open than Cardinal №7, while ɔ is near to Cardinal №6. In some cases it cannot be distinguished o from ɔ. Words with o-vowels are more common than with ɔ-vowels.

ro - body
tòt(o) - hill
kʷɔrlo - giraffe
kʷɔlɛ - pot

- the central vowels ä, ö: ä often emerges as a modificator of a or another vowel when it's about connected speech. Ö has been noticed in a higher number of words.

mà kàb(e) - I shall go
köndèi - small basket

== Grammar ==
=== Nouns ===
Most of the nouns in Bagirmi are disyllabic and the common noun form is a consonant + vowel + consonant + vowel. The final vowel is usually semi-mute.

Examples:

ŋʷon(o) - child
njɨl(i) - shadow

The simpliest form of nouns in Bagirmi is monosyllabic and usually consists of a consonant and vowel.

Examples:

ro - body
ŋga - foreigner
njo - night

In Bagirmi language plurality of nouns is presented by the suffix -ge. This rule applies not only to the simple noun but also to its possible qualifiers and to the end in noun compounds and genetive constructions. In this case, the suffix is added only once at the end of the noun phrase.

Examples:

kam(o) (eye) $\rightarrow$ kamge (eyes)
bat(a) (sheep (singular)) $\rightarrow$ badge (sheep (plural))

==== Forms denoting sex ====
To indicate sex ŋgab(a) (man, male) or nee (woman, female) should be added to a noun.

Examples:

ŋʷon ŋgab(a) - boy
ŋʷon nee - girl

=== Adjectives ===
Most words in adjectival constructions act as nominal or verbal roots and cannot be differentiated from them (except the fact that they are more subject to reduplication). These words are “adjectives” only due to their applications. Also, a lot of these words can take both nominal and verbal affixes.

=== Pronouns ===
Personal pronouns in Bagirmi are used as:

==== A. forms of personal mention applied in isolation or as subject in non-verbal predication ====
	singular	plural
1st person	ma (I)	je/jege (we)
2nd person	i (you)	se/sege (you, pl.)
3rd person	ne (he, she)	je/jege (they)

Examples:

ma deb ŋgab(a) – I am a man
i ‘Barma – you are a Bagirmi
ne ŋgʷol(o) – he/she is big
ma mala or ma ‘döŋ – I myself
je mala or je ‘döŋ (or je ‘döŋge) – we ourselves

==== B. forms of personal mention applied as object of a verb as possessor in the genitive case and also after prepositions ====
	singular	plural
1st person	-(ʉ)m(a) (I)	-je (we)
2nd person	-I (you)	-se (you, pl)
3rd person	-(i)ny(a) (he, she)	-je (they)

The first and third persons: sing. -ʉm(a) and -iny(a) are used after a consonant, -(m)a and -ny(a) after a vowel.

Examples:

As object of verb:

(following a consonant) je j-ɛt k-ak- ʉm(a) – they see me
(following a vowel) je j- ɛt ki-nya-m(a) – they leave me

After a preposition:

sem(a), sɨ-m(a) – with me
si – with you
se-ny(a), sɨ-ny(a) – with him/her

==== C. forms of personal mention applied before suffixes and postpositions ====
In this position pronouns don't have any changes except the omission of semi-mute vowels. It's only about the first and third persons of B-forms.

The examples demonstrate only the general locative postposition -ki.

jo-m-ki – on me
jo-ny-ki – on him
but jo-je-ki – on us

=== Verbs ===
==== Verb classes ====
For conjugational purposes verbs are divided into five classes built on the form of the verbal roots. Verbal roots mainly have a monosyllabic or disyllabic form. A reliable indicator of class is the presence or absence of the prefix k- in the Indefenite Aspect or the Infinitive.

1. Class I: Monosyllabic verbs containing a consonant (or consonant combination) and vowel.
  sa - eat
  nya - put
  nji - sit
2. Class II: Dissyllabic verbs containing a vowel plus consonant plus vowel (the last vowel is often semi-mute). Also, all verbs of Class II take k- prefix.
  ab(e) - go
  ak(a) - see
  ad(a) - give
3. Class III: Dissyllabic verbs containing a consonant plus vowel plus consonant plus vowel (the last vowel is often semi-mute). A consonant can be presented as a consonant combination. Monosyllabic verbs could also be included into this Class. They consist of a consonant plus long (or half-length) vowel or vowel combination.
  tad(a) - make, do
  ŋgal(a) - swim
  'bar(a) - cook
4. Class IV: Verbs of the Class III pattern but with an initial vowel.
5. Class V: Verbs containing a consonant plus vowel plus consonant plus vowel plus consonant plus vowel (sometimes the mid/final vowel is missing).
  ndokolo - roll
  tatla - clean
  susuri - scatter

==== Verb aspects ====
There are two types of verb aspects in Bagirmi language: the Definite Aspect and the Indefinite Aspect. The Definite Aspect is applicable to complete, momentary verb actions. The Indefinite Aspect, conversely, represents verb actions which are incomplete, progressive. The Definite Aspect is also used to indicate the Imperative mood. The Indefinite Aspect is defined by the prefix k- in verbs from Class I and Class II.

==== Negation ====
The negation of verbs is presented by adding a postposition eli. The initial vowel is omitted when preceded by another vowel (except the situation when pronouns ma and i are placed).

Examples:

ma m-sa li – I did not eat
je j-ab eli – we did not go
se gei-ki li – you (pl) do not, or did not, want

There is also a postposition daali which means “no more”, “no longer”.

Examples:

ma m-tad-iny daali – I did not do it again
je j-ab nuu daali – they did not go there any longer

=== Word order ===
Bagirmi language saves a direct word order in a sentence (subject + verb + object).

je ka-ma napa
we help {each other}

When it comes to the genitive construction, the possessor always follows the possessed.

Examples:

‘bel an Paca – captive of the Patia

=== Adverbs ===
In Bagirmi there are only several words whose function is adverbial and could be described as adverbs. Majority of adverbial constructions are made up of nouns, pronouns, verbs, adjectivals, with or without implementing of prepositions and postpositions, could contain a phrase or even a sentence. Not rarely an adverbial phrase is built up by integrating a preposition or postposition with a noun or pronoun.

The usual place of adverbials is at the end of a sentence. This position is especially suitable for interrogatives and adverbials of place and manner.

=== Numerals ===
base numeral		+10		× 10		× 100	
1	kɛ'dɛ	11	dokkeme kar kɛ'dɛ	10	dokkeme	100	aru
2	sap	12	dokkeme kar sap	20	dʉk-sap	200	aru-sap
3	mʷʉta	13	dokkeme kar mʷʉta	30	dʉk-mʷʉta		
4	so	14	dokkeme kar so	40	dʉk-so		
5	mi	15	dokkeme kar mi	50	dʉk-mi		
6	mika (5+1)	16	dokkeme kar mika	60	dʉk-mika		
7	c~~i~~li or cili	17	dokkeme kar c~~i~~li (cili)	70	dʉk-c~~i~~li (cili)		
8	marta	18	dokkeme kar marta	80	dʉk-marta		
9	doso	19	dokkeme kar doso	90	dʉk-doso		
10	dokkeme	20	—N/a	100	—N/a		

In Bagirmi there are no ordinal numbers. The order is expressed only by the cardinals, adverbs and postpositions. And adverbials ("times") can be expressed by using mʷot(o) (under).

Example:

'de nja mʷʉta - He came on the third day
ne 'de mi - He came fifth
ne tad ŋgas ɛnna mʷot(o) - dokkeme - He did this ten times

==== Word order ====
In Bagirmi language the order of numerals and nouns in relation to each other is reverse.

Examples:

nja sap - two days
nap mi - five months
