= Bidiyo language =

Afro-Asiatic language of Chad

Bidiyo
- Bidio
- Native to: Chad
- Region: Guera Region
- Native speakers: (14,000 cited 1981)
- Language family: Afro-Asiatic: Chadic; East Chadic; East Chadic B; Dangla (B.1.1); Bidiyo
- Dialects: Bigawguno; Garawgino; Jekkino; Nalguno; Oboyguno
- Writing system: Latin

Language codes
- ISO 639-3: bid
- Glottolog: bidi1241

Bidiyo (also known as Bidyo, Bidio, 'Bidio, 'Bidiyo, Bidiyo-Waana, Bidiya) is an Afro-Asiatic language spoken in south central Chad.
