= Dangaléat language =

Afro-Asiatic language spoken in Chad

Dangaléat
- daŋla
- Native to: Chad
- Region: central
- Native speakers: 60,000 (2005)
- Language family: Afro-Asiatic: Chadic; East Chadic; East Chadic B; Dangla languages (B.1.1); Dangaléat

Language codes
- ISO 639-3: daa
- Glottolog: dang1274
- ELP: Dangaleat

Dangaléat (also known as Dangla, Danal, Dangal) is an Afro-Asiatic language spoken in central Chad. Speakers make up the majority of the population of Migami Canton in Mongo, Chad.

== Phonemes ==
Consonants (Central Dangaleat, Burke 1995)
		Labial	Alveolar	Palatal	Velar
Plosive	voiceless	p	t	c	k
Plosive	voiced	b	d	ɟ	g
Plosive	implosive	ɓ	ɗ	ʄ	
Fricative	voiceless		s		
Fricative	voiced		z		
Nasal		m	n	ɲ	ŋ
Approximant		w		j	
Lateral			l		
Rhotic			r / ɾ		

Vowels
	Front	Central	Back
High	i iː		u uː
High-mid	e eː		o oː
Low-mid	ɛ ɛː		ɔ ɔː
Low		a aː	

== Example ==
=== Sample text in Dangaleat (Lord's Prayer,Matthew 6:9-13) ===
Baaba, Buŋ kaak goy kuwa ka samaaner, gee okin̰co yaa ibine kadar siŋji kun̰jiŋ ŋuur keeco. Meennuwin̰ yaa ase ɗo duniiner. Gee okin̰co, ŋu ginguwoŋ taat ki rakiyo keɗer ar ŋu gingiy kuwa ka samaaner. Berni tee kaak yaani nece ƴiriyta. Saamiyniŋgu zunuubinni ar nin oki saamiygiy ɗo gee kuuk niginti. Dakni rasenno Seetanne yaani gece, kar gay gooƴni minniney. [Asaan lociŋ di Meennaw, gudurre ho iŋ *darjine elgin iŋ elgina. Aamin.]

=== Translation ===
Our Father, which art in heaven, Hallowed be thy Name. Thy Kingdom come. Thy will be done in earth, As it is in heaven. Give us this day our daily bread. And forgive us our trespasses, As we forgive them that trespass against us. And lead us not into temptation, But deliver us from evil. For thine is the kingdom, The power, and the glory, For ever and ever. Amen.
