= Sokoro language =

Afro-Asiatic language of central Chad

Sokoro
- Native to: Chad
- Region: central
- Native speakers: (5,000 cited 1994)
- Language family: Afro-Asiatic: Chadic; East Chadic; East Chadic B; Sokoro (B.3); Sokoro

Language codes
- ISO 639-3: sok
- Glottolog: soko1263
- ELP: Sokoro

Sokoro is an Afro-Asiatic language spoken in central Chad. Dialects are Bedanga and Sokoro. Speakers make up the majority of the population of Gogmi Canton in Melfi, Chad.
