= Chadic languages =

Branch of the Afroasiatic languages

Chadic
- Geographic distribution: Nigeria, Niger, Chad, Cameroon
- Native speakers: c. 80 million
- Linguistic classification: Afro-Asiatic: Chadic
- Proto-language: Proto-Chadic
- Subdivisions: Biu–Mandara; East Chadic; Masa; West Chadic

Language codes
- ISO 639-5: cdc
- Glottolog: chad1250
- Map of the distribution of the Chadic languages within Africa

- Detailed map of the distribution of Chadic languages in Western and Central Africa

The Chadic languages form a branch of the Afroasiatic language family. They are spoken in parts of the Sahel. They include 196 languages spoken across northern Nigeria, southern Niger, southern Chad, and northern Cameroon. By far the most widely spoken Chadic language is Hausa, a lingua franca of much of inland Eastern West Africa, particularly Niger and the northern half of Nigeria. Hausa is the only Chadic language with more than 1 million speakers.

== Composition ==
Paul Newman (1977) classified the languages into the four groups which have been accepted in all subsequent literature. Further subbranching, however, has not been as robust; Roger Blench (2006), for example, only accepts the A/B bifurcation of East Chadic. Subsequent work by Joseph Lovestrand argues strongly that Kujarge is a valid member of East Chadic. The placing of Luri as a primary split of West Chadic is erroneous. Bernard Caron (2004) shows that this language is South Bauchi and part of the Polci cluster. A suggestion for including the language isolate Kujargé as an early-diverged member, which subsequently became influenced by East Chadic, has been made by Blench (2008).

- Chadic
  - West Chadic
    - the Hausa, Ron, Bole, and Angas languages
    - the Bade, Warji, and Zaar languages
  - Biu–Mandara (Central Chadic)
    - the Bura, Kamwe, and Bata languages, among other groups
    - the Buduma and Musgu languages
    - Gidar
  - East Chadic
    - the Tumak, Nancere, and Kera languages
    - the Dangaléat, Mukulu, and Sokoro languages
  - Masa

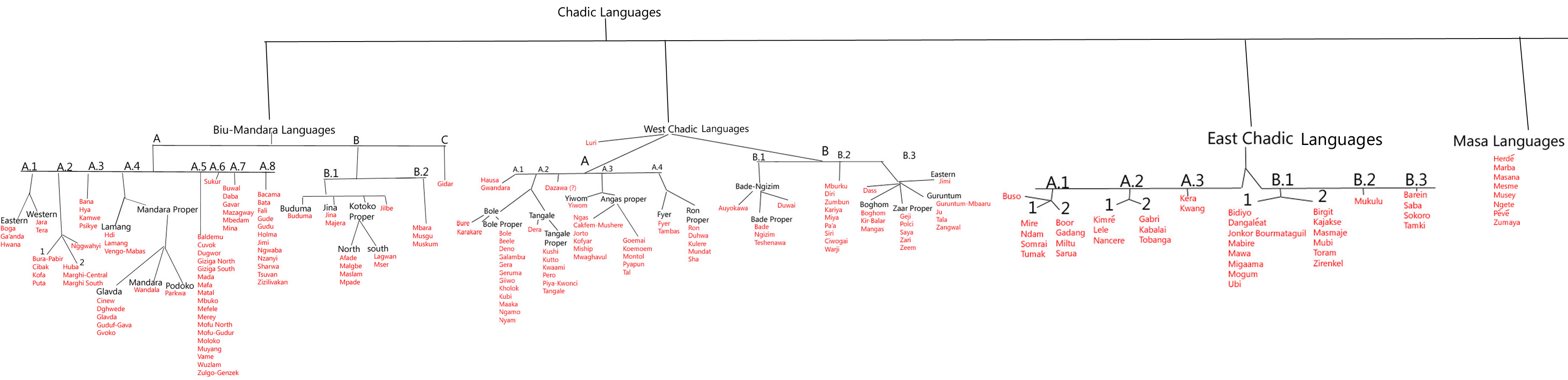
A chart of the Chadic branch of the Afroasiatic languages.

== Loanwords ==
Chadic languages contain many Nilo-Saharan loanwords from either the Songhay or Maban branches, pointing to early contact between Chadic and Nilo-Saharan speakers as Chadic was migrating west.

Although Adamawa languages are spoken adjacently to Chadic languages, interaction between Chadic and Adamawa is limited.

== Pronouns ==
Pronouns in Proto-Chadic, as compared to pronouns in Proto-Afroasiatic (Vossen & Dimmendaal 2020:351):

Pronoun	Proto-Chadic	Proto-Afroasiatic
1	*ní	*i ~ *yi
2M	*ka	*ku, *ka
2F	*ki(m)	*kim
3M	*nì	*si, *isi
3F	*ta	
1PL	*mun (incl.), *na (excl.)	(*-na ~ *-nu ~ *-ni) ?
2PL	*kun	*kuuna
3PL	*sun	*su ~ *usu

== Comparative vocabulary ==
Sample basic vocabulary in different Chadic branches listed in order from west to east, with reconstructions of other Afroasiatic branches also given for comparison:

Language	eye	ear	nose	tooth	tongue	mouth	blood	bone	tree	water	eat	name
Proto-Chadic	*ydn	*km/*ɬm	*ntn	*s₃n; *ƙ-d	*ls₃-	*bk	*br	*ƙs₃		*ymn	*hrɗ (hard); *twy (soft)	*s₃m
Hausa	ido	kunne	hanci	haƙori	harshe	baki	jini	ƙashi	itaci; bishiya	ruwa	ci	suna
Proto-Ron		*kumu	*atin	*haŋgor	*liʃ	*fo	ɟɑ̄lɑ̄, tɾɔ̃̄	*kaʃ				*sum
Proto-South Bauchi	*(gwà)yìr(-ŋ)	*kə̂m(-si)				*bʸak(-ì)	*bìràm	*gu(ŋ)ul	*pit-ə̀			*(yì)sûm(-s₃)
Polci	yiir	kəəm	cin	haƙori	shen	bii	buran; bəran	gooloo	pət	maa	ci	suŋ
Proto-Central Chadic	*hadaj; *tsɨʸ	*ɬɨmɨɗʸ	*hʷɨtsɨnʸ	*ɬɨɗɨnʸ	*ɗɨrɨnɨhʸ; *ɣanaɗʸ; *naɬɨj		*maj	*ɗiɬ; *kɨrakaɬʸ	*hʷɨp	*ɗɨjɨm	*zɨm	*ɬɨmɨɗʸ
Proto-Masa	*ir	*hum	*cin	*s-	*si	*vun	*vuzur	*sok	*gu	*mb-	*ti	*sem
Kujarge	kunɟu	kumayo ~ kime	kaata	kiya	aliŋati	apa	ɪbɪrí	(kaɟeɟa), kàyɛ́ya	kaʃíè	ʃia	(tona), tuye [imp. sg.]; tuwona [imp. pl.]	rúwà
Other Afroasiatic branches
Proto-Cushitic	*ʔil-		*ʔisŋʷ-	*ʔiɬkʷ-	*caanrab-	*ʔaf-/*yaf-		*mikʷ’-; *moc’-			*-aħm-/*-uħm-; *ɬaam-	*sim-/*sum-
Proto-Maji	*ʔaːb	*háːy		*aːç’u		*eːdu		*uːs	*inču	*haːy	*um	
Tarifiyt Berber	ŧit’t’	aməžžun, aməz’z’uɣ	ŧinzā	ŧiɣməsŧ	iřəs	aqəmmum	iđammən	iɣəss		aman	šš	isəm
Coptic	ia	ma'aje	ša	šol, najhe	las	ro	snof	kas	šēn	mou	wōm	ran
Proto-Semitic	*ʕayn-	*ʔuḏn-	*ʔanp-	*šinn-	*lišān-		*dam-	*ʕaṯ̣m-	*ʕiṣ̂-	*mā̆y-	*ʔ-k-l	(*šim-)
Proto-Afroasiatic	*ʔǐl-	*-ʔânxʷ-		*sǐn-/*sǎn- 'tip, point'	*-lis’- 'to lick'	*âf-	*dîm-/*dâm-	*k’os-	*ɣǎ	*âm-; *akʷ’-	*-mǎaʕ-; *-iit-; *-kʷ’-̌	*sǔm-/*sǐm-

== Bibliography ==
- Caron, Bernard 2004. Le Luri: quelques notes sur une langue tchadique du Nigeria. In: Pascal Boyeldieu & Pierre Nougayrol (eds.), Langues et Cultures: Terrains d’Afrique. Hommages à France Cloarec-Heiss (Afrique et Language 7). 193–201. Louvain-Paris: Peeters.
- Lukas, Johannes (1936) 'The linguistic situation in the Lake Chad area in Central Africa.' Africa, 9, 332–349.
- Lukas, Johannes. Zentralsudanische Studien, Hamburg 1937;
- Newman, Paul; Ma, Roxana (1966). "Comparative Chadic: Phonology and lexicon". Journal of African Languages. 5: 218–251. hdl:2022/21342.
- Newman, Paul (1977) 'Chadic classification and reconstructions.' Afroasiatic Linguistics 5, 1, 1–42.
- Newman, Paul (1978) 'Chado-Hamitic 'adieu': new thoughts on Chadic language classification', in Fronzaroli, Pelio (ed.), Atti del Secondo Congresso Internazionale di Linguistica Camito-Semitica. Florence: Instituto de Linguistica e di Lingue Orientali, Università di Firenze, 389–397.
- Newman, Paul (1980) The Classification of Chadic within Afroasiatic. Leiden: Universitaire Pers Leiden.
- Herrmann Jungraithmayr, Kiyoshi Shimizu: Chadic lexical roots. Reimer, Berlin 1981.
- Herrmann Jungraithmayr, Dymitr Ibriszimow: Chadic lexical roots. 2 volumes. Reimer, Berlin 1994
- Schuh, Russell (2003) 'Chadic overview', in M. Lionel Bender, Gabor Takacs, and David L. Appleyard (eds.), Selected Comparative-Historical Afrasian Linguistic Studies in Memory of Igor M. Diakonoff, LINCOM Europa, 55–60.

Data sets

- Kraft, Charles H. (1981). "CLDF:Wordlist". CLDF dataset derived from Kraft's "Chadic Wordlists" from 1981. Geneva. doi:10.5281/zenodo.3534953.

== See also ==
- Klingenheben's law
- Proto-Chadic reconstructions (Wiktionary)
