= Classification of Pygmy languages =

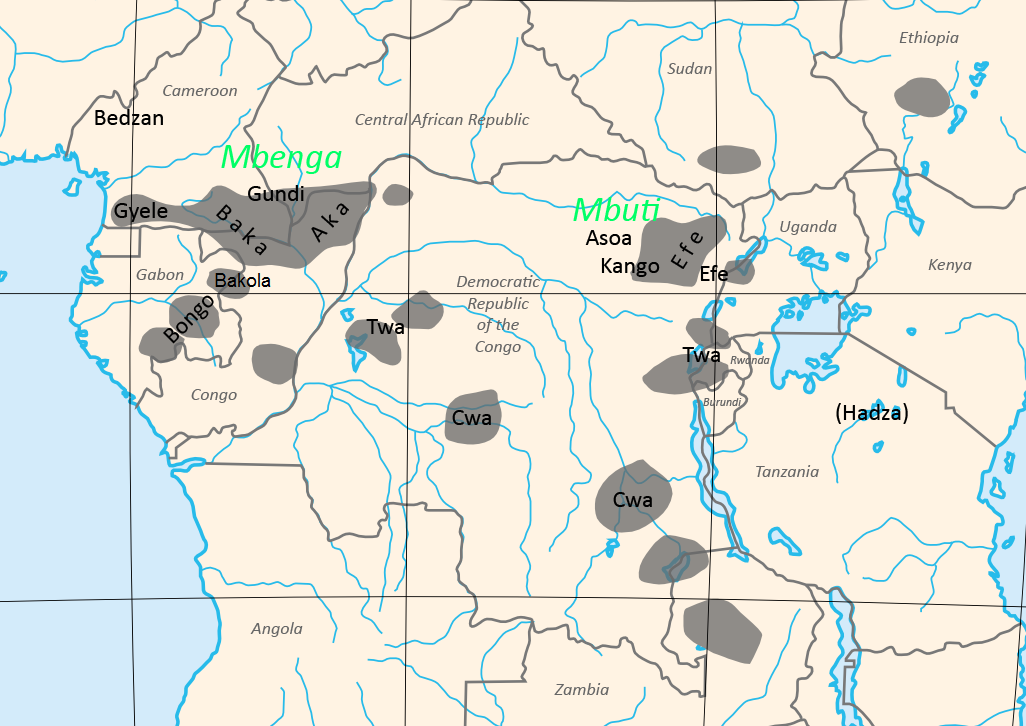
Distribution of Pygmies according to Cavalli-Sforza. A number of the southern Twa are missing.

The term African Pygmies refers to "forest people" who have or recently had a hunter-gatherer economy and a simple, non-hierarchical societal structure based on band societies; are of short stature; (Note: Generally speaking; those who are not particularly short, such as the Babongo and Bedzan, are sometimes distinguished as "pygmoid".) have a deep cultural and religious affinity with the Congolian rainforests; (Note: Apart from those who live in the savannah or mixed terrain, such as the Bofi and Bedzan.) and live in a generally subservient relationship with agricultural "patrons", with which they trade forest products such as meat and honey for agricultural and iron products.

Though lumped together as "Pygmies" by outsiders, including their patrons, these peoples are not related to each other either ethnically or linguistically. Different Pygmy peoples may have distinct genetic mechanisms for their short stature, demonstrating diverse origins.

== Original Pygmy language(s) ==
An original Pygmy language has been postulated for at least some Pygmy groups. Merritt Ruhlen writes that "African Pygmies speak languages belonging to either to the Nilo-Saharan or Niger–Kordofanian families. It is assumed that Pygmies once spoke their own language(s), but that, through living in symbiosis with other Africans in prehistorical times, they adopted languages belonging to these two families." The linguistic evidence that such languages existed include Mbenga forest vocabulary which is shared by the neighbouring Ubangian-speaking Baka and Bantu-speaking Aka (though not by the Mbuti, and this connection is not ancient) and the Rimba dialect of Punu which may contain a core of non-Bantu vocabulary. It has been postulated that ancestral speakers may have been part of a complex of non-Pygmoid languages of hunter-gatherer populations in Africa whose only surviving descendants today mostly ring the rainforest.

A common hypothesis is that African Pygmies are the direct descendants of the Late Stone Age hunter-gatherer peoples of the central African rainforest who were partially absorbed or displaced by later immigration of agricultural peoples and adopted their Central Sudanic, Ubangian and Bantu languages. While there is a scarcity of excavated archaeological sites in Central Africa that could support this hypothesis, genetic studies have shown that Pygmy populations possess ancient divergent Y-DNA lineages (especially haplogroups A and B) in high frequencies in contrast to their neighbours (who possess mostly haplogroup E).

Some 30% of the Aka language is not Bantu, and a similar percentage of the Baka language is not Ubangian. Much of this vocabulary is botanical, and deals with honey-collecting or is otherwise specialized for the forest, and much of it is shared between the two western Pygmy groups. It has been proposed that this is the remnant of an independent western Pygmy (Mbenga or "Baaka") language. However, this split was only reconstructed to the 15th century, so there is no reason to think that it is ancient.

== Peoples and languages ==
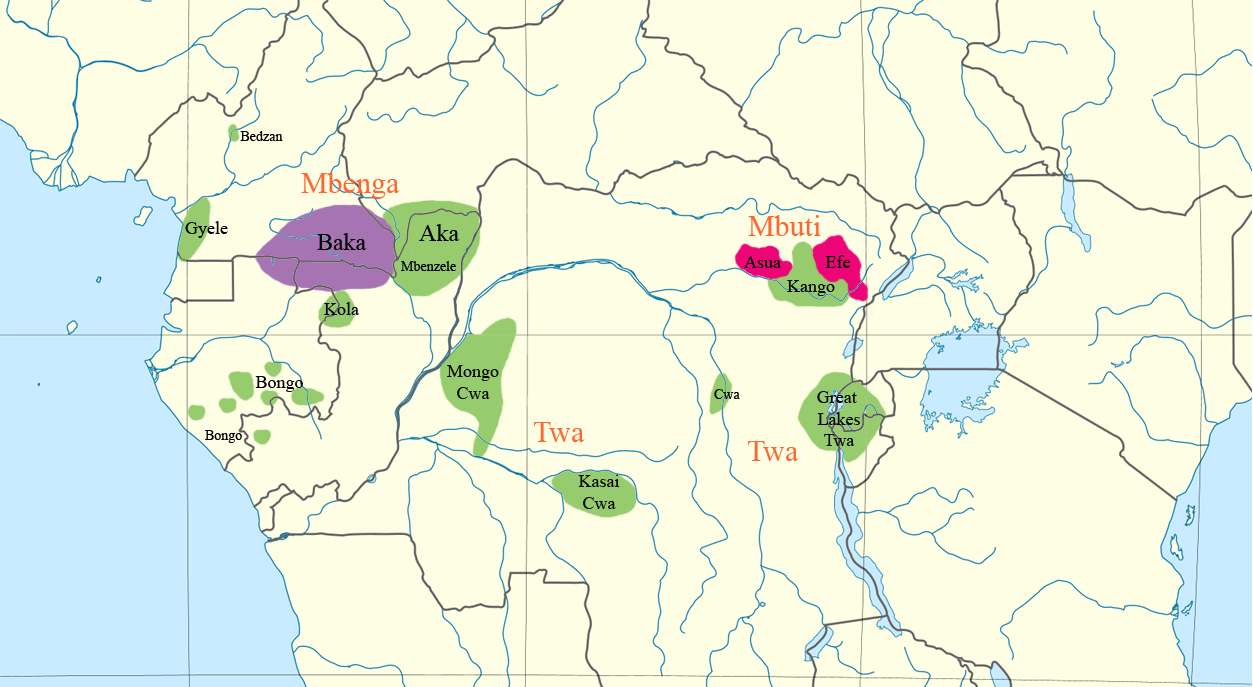
Distribution of Pygmy languages according to Bahuchet. Green are Bantu, red are Central Sudanic, and purple are Ubangian. Southern Twa is not shown.

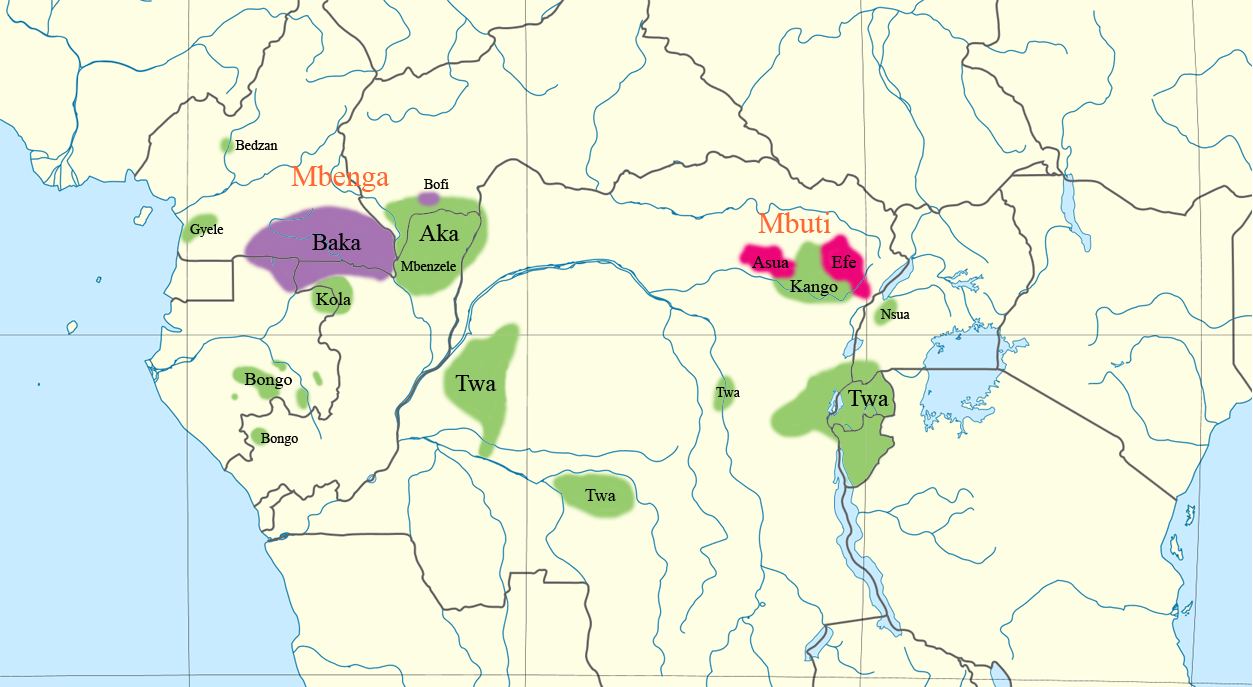
Modification by Hewlett and Fancher. Bofi is added in the west, and Nsua in the east.

There are over a dozen attested Pygmy peoples (Note: There are other, undocumented hunter-gatherer forest peoples such as the Mbati and Bolimba of the Central African Republic, and there are thought to be more in the two Congos and in Angola.) numbering at least 350,000 in the Congo Basin. The best known are the Mbenga (Aka and Baka) of the western Congo Basin who speak Bantu and Ubangian languages; the Mbuti (Efe et al.) of the Ituri Rainforest, who speak Bantu and Central Sudanic languages, and the Twa of the Great Lakes, who speak Bantu Rwanda-Rundi. All attested Pygmy peoples speak languages from these three language families, and only three peoples, the Aka, Baka, and Asua, have their own language.

=== Bedzan ===
Medzan (Bedzan) live in Cameroon not far from the Nigerian border. They speak a dialect of Tikar, a Bantoid language.

Population: 400

=== Mbenga ===
- The Aka of the Central African Republic and the Republic of Congo speak Aka (Yaka) which is a Bantu language close to Lingala. The Benzele Aka are well known for their music.

Population: 30–50,000
Miyaka (N Gabon, Bantu), Luma (N Gabon, Bantu) appear to be Aka (Benzele) groups.

- The Baka (a.k.a. Ngombe) of Cameroon and Gabon speak closely related Ubangian languages of the Ngbaka branch: Baka proper, Ganzi, and Gundi AKA Ngondi.

Population: 30–40,000

- In the Central African Republic north of the Aka are a group who speak the language of their neighbors, Bofi, which is a language of the Gbaya branch.

Population: 3,000

- The Gyele (a.k.a. Kola or Koya) are the westernmost Pygmies, living in southern Cameroon near the coast, and in Equatorial Guinea on the coast. They speak two dialects of the Bantu Mvumbo language.

Population: 4,000

- The Kola (a.k.a. Koya) of Congo and northwestern Gabon speak a Bantu language, Ngom.

Population: 2,600

- Bongo, or Akoa, of southern Gabon speak several Bantu languages, including Tsogo, Nzebi, West Teke, Punu, Lumbu, Myene, Kaningi, and perhaps others such as Yasa. The Punu dialect of the Irimba, however, may have a non-Bantu core.

Population: 3,000

=== Mbuti ===
- The Efé speak the Central Sudanic language Lese.

Population: 10,000?

- The Asoa speak their own Central Sudanic language (Asoa), related to Mangbetu, the language of one of their patrons.

Population: 10,000?

- The Kango (a.k.a. Sua) speak the Bantu language Bila.

Population: 26,000?

=== Twa ===
The various Twa populations all speak Bantu languages.

- The Nsua of Uganda speak Bantu.

Population: 1,000

- The Great Lakes Twa of the Great Lakes (Rwanda, Burundi, eastern D.R. Congo, southern Uganda) speak Rundi and Kiga.

Population: 10,000

- The Mongo Twa or Ntomba Twa (locally Cwa, pronounced approximately /ˈtʃwɑː/) of Lake Tumba and Lake Mai-Ndombe of western D.R. Congo, speak several varieties of Mongo (Konda, Ntomba, and Lia), which are either divergent dialects or closely related languages.

Population: 14,000

- The Kasai Twa or Kuba Twa (Cwa) of Kasai (central D.R. Congo) speak Bushong.
- The Mbote Twa (Bambote) northwest of Lake Tanganyika speak a D20 language. (Note: Holoholo is in approximately the right location)
- The Upemba Twa or Luba Twa (Cwa) of the Upemba Depression speak Luba-Katanga, Hemba, Songe, and Taabwa.
- The Bangweulu Twa of Bangweulu Swamps, Zambia, speak Bemba.
- The Lukanga Twa of the Lukanga Swamp, Zambia, speak Lenje.
- The Kafwe Twa of the Kafue Flats, Zambia, speak Tonga.
- The Twa of Angola live among the Ngambwe, Havakona, Zimba and Himba, and presumably speak their languages.
- Kitembo

Physically, these southern Twa do not differ from their Bantu neighbors, but have a similar subservient position to their agricultural neighbors as the forest Pygmies. They may be remnant Khoisan populations; the Ila, Tonga, and Lenje of Zambia, and the Chewa of Malawi, for example, believe them to be aboriginal peoples, and trace sacred places to them, but Blench suggests that they may have instead migrated from the forest with the Bantu, and were later conflated with aboriginal populations in legend.

== Bibliography ==
The most complete account of Pygmy languages is found in Serge Bahuchet (1993) Histoire d'une civilisation forestière, volume 2.
