= Paul Schebesta =

Polish Catholic missionary (1887–1967)

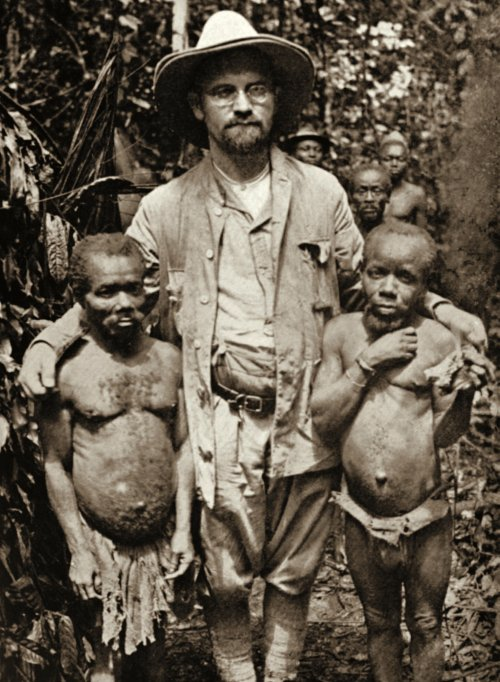
- Schebesta (center) before 1935
- Born: 20 March 1887; Pietrowice Wielkie, Moravia, Austria-Hungary
- Died: 17 September 1967 (aged 80); Maria Enzersdorf, Austria
- Education: Mission House St. Gabriel; University of Vienna
- Years active: 1911–1967

Paul Schebesta (20 March 1887 – 17 September 1967) was a Polish Catholic missionary, ethnographer, linguist and anthropologist. He was a member of the Society of the Divine Word. He is known for his studies on pygmy peoples and was one of the leading authorities on the subject.

== Early life ==
Paul Schebesta was born on 20 March 1887 in Pietrowice Wielkie, Moravia, Austria-Hungary (now Poland). He was of Moravian ancestry and was fluent in Czech and Polish, but he had to learn German when he went to school. After going to high school in Nysa, Schebesta attended the Mission House St. Gabriel, a seminary in Maria Enzersdorf, Mödling District, and then the University of Vienna, from which he received a doctorate in 1926.

== Career ==
In 1911, Schebesta was ordained with the Society of the Divine Word (SVD) and was sent to Portuguese Mozambique. He was interned by the colonial authority from 1916 to 1920, during World War I, as an "enemy alien." After returning from Mozambique, he went back to the seminary in Mödling District and became an editor for the anthropological and ethnological journal Anthropos from 1920 to 1923 under the guide of Wilhelm Schmidt. Schmidt encouraged his students to study the pygmy peoples and recommended that Schebesta should travel to British Malaya and study the Semang peoples, which he did in 1924. There, Schebesta was shown a fresh burial site upon request. He later dug up those graves of three recently buried men and took their human remains with him back to Vienna. Schebesta collected data through video and audio recordings, additionally focusing on taking measurements and creating plaster casts of body parts whilst collecting skeletal remains.

From 1934 to 1955, Schebesta made two more trips to study the Semang, three trips to the Belgian Congo to study the Mbuti people, and a short trip to study the Aeta people in the Philippines. His second expedition to the Congo was with Martin Gusinde and Jean-Baptiste Jadin. From these excursions, he learned the Bantu, Swahili, and Malay languages. During his research in the Congo, Schebesta offered indigenous people gifts, such as tobacco, pearls, and food in exchange for permission to create a plaster cast of their body parts.

After World War II, Schebesta focused on training SVD missionaries at the seminary in Mödling.

== Death ==
Schebesta died on 17 September 1967, at the Mission House St. Gabriel seminary in Mödling.

== Legacy ==
Schebesta was one of the first researchers at the time to classify pygmy people as members of the human species, instead of a variation of mutation, rejecting the idea that they were primitive. Schebesta's most popular works were his travel reports, which were published in multiple languages and primarily described his experiences in the field using anecdotes. He was also one of the first people to describe the pygmies in Southeast Asia and Africa, but never gained broad international attention from the scientific community. According to anthropologist Margit Berner, Schebesta was not as well recognized due to his clerical background and the field methods he used.

Schebesta also wanted to foster the survival of the pygmies and make sure that they would fit into modern civilization, to which the Bambuti people gave him the honorary title of "Baba wa Bambuti". He also worked on recording the and preserving the dialects and languages of the people, including Mamvu, Mangbutu, Batak Karo, Mvuba, and Lese.

Schebesta's plaster casts were later used to create physical models of the pygmy peoples. The casts and some human remains he gathered can be found in the Department of Anthropology collection of the Natural History Museum, Vienna and the collection of the National Museum, Prague among other institutions.
