= Mangbetu =

Mangbetu may refer to:

- Mangbetu people, a people of the Democratic Republic of the Congo
- Mangbetu language, one of the most populous of the Central Sudanic languages
- Mangbetu languages, a cluster of closely related languages spoken in the Democratic Republic of Congo
