= Wochua people =

Wochua (singular Achua) was the endonym of a pygmy people of the forests of the Democratic Republic of the Congo, south of the Welle River. They were first described in the Western world in 1880–1883 by Wilhelm Junker. They may be the same as the Kango Mbuti, who are called Batchua (the root is Twa, pronounced Cwa [approximately /ˈtʃwɑː/] in Congo); they are reported to have associated with the Maigo (patrons of the Kango), the Momfu (patrons of the Efé, but Wochua is a Bantu term), and the Mabode (unidentified).
