= Asoa =

Asoa or ASOA may refer to:

- Asoa language
- Asoa people
- A Swarm of Angels, an open source film project
- Azerbaijan State Oil Academy, now the Azerbaijan State Oil and Industry University
