= Šebesta =

Šebesta (feminine: Šebestová) is a Czech and Slovak surname. It was derived from the given name Šebestián (a Czech version of the name Sebastian). The surname was first documented in 1579. Germanised versions of the surname include Schebesta and Schebest. Notable people with the surname include:

- Andrea Šebestová (born 1978), Czech gymnast
- Daniel Šebesta (born 1991), Slovak footballer
- Ivana Šebestová (born 2001), Czech tennis player
- Jakub Šebesta (born 1948), Czech politician
- Jim Sebesta (born 1935), American politician
- Katarína Brychtová, née Šebestová (born 1967), Slovak actress

== Fictional characters ==
- Mach a Šebestová, Czech cartoon series
- May Events, 1951 Czech comedy film with the Šebesta family as main characters

== See also ==
- Agnese Schebest (1813–1869), Austrian operatic mezzo-soprano
- Paul Schebesta (1887–1967), German anthropologist
