= Mayogo =

Mayogo may refer to:

- Mayogo people, an ethnic group in Central Africa
- Mayogo language, a Ubangian language of Central Africa
