= Mongo Twa =

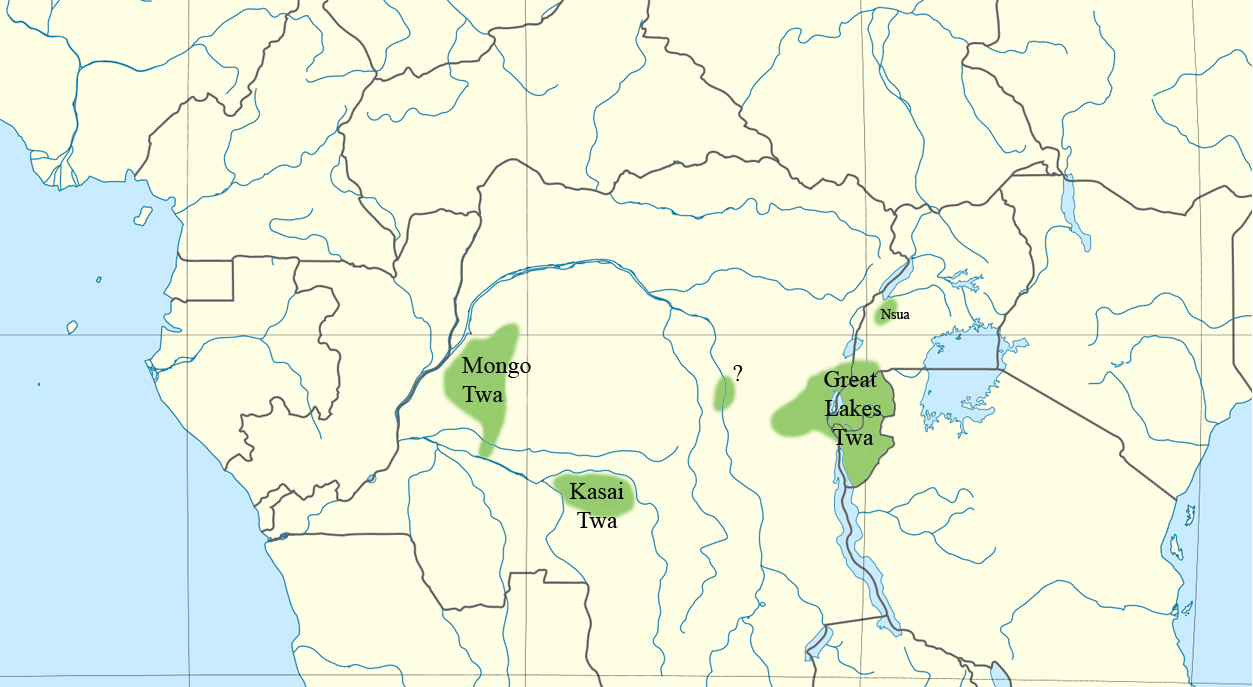
The northern Twa. The west-most group are the Mongo Twa.

The 14,000 Twa (locally Cwa, approximately /ˈtʃwɑː/) of the swamp forest north and west of Lake Tumba and between Tumba and Lake Mai-Ndombe in the west of the Congo are one of several fishing and hunter-gatherer castes living in a patron–client relationship with farming Bantu peoples across central and southern Africa. In this case the people are the Mongo, specifically the Mongo tribes known as Ntomba, Lia (Bolia), and Konda. The two castes are called Oto and Twa: The Oto are the agricultural patrons of the Twa.

Hunting is easiest for the Twa in the rainy season, the period of seasonal hunger, as the flooded rivers force game to high ground near the villages, which are separated from each other by the marshes. They exchange the game for cassava, palm oil, iron, and pottery. Unlike the situation further south, it is the patron Oto who do the fishing. The Twa were as of the late 1970s being forced to settle, as their foraging territory was being cleared for farming (Pagezy).

As of the late 20th-century there was little mixing between the castes. On the rare occasion that an Oto man has a child with a Twa woman, the child is raised as Twa. This is in contrast to the Mbenga and Mbuti, where village men commonly take Pygmy wives, and the child grows up in the village (Hiernaux).

Normally the name "Twa" is used alone, but when disambiguation is required, these people may be called the Mongo Twa, Konda Twa, Lia Twa, Ntomba Twa.

== See also ==
- Bolia People
- Twa peoples
- Classification of Pygmy languages
