= Ntomba =

Ntomba may be,

- Lake Ntomba
- Ntomba Twa
- Ntomba language
