= Kango people =

The Kango (Bakango), also known as the Batchua and Mbuti-Sua, are an Mbuti pygmy people of the Ituri forest. They speak a Bantu language, Bila, apparently in two dialects, northern Sua and southern Kango.

They are in a patron–vassal relationship with several Bantu-speaking peoples, the Bila, Budu, Ndaka, Bombo, Liko, and Baali; two Sudanic peoples, the Lese and Luumbi, and the Ubangian Mayogo.

They may be the Wochua people described in the 19th century.
