= Mangbetu Pottery =

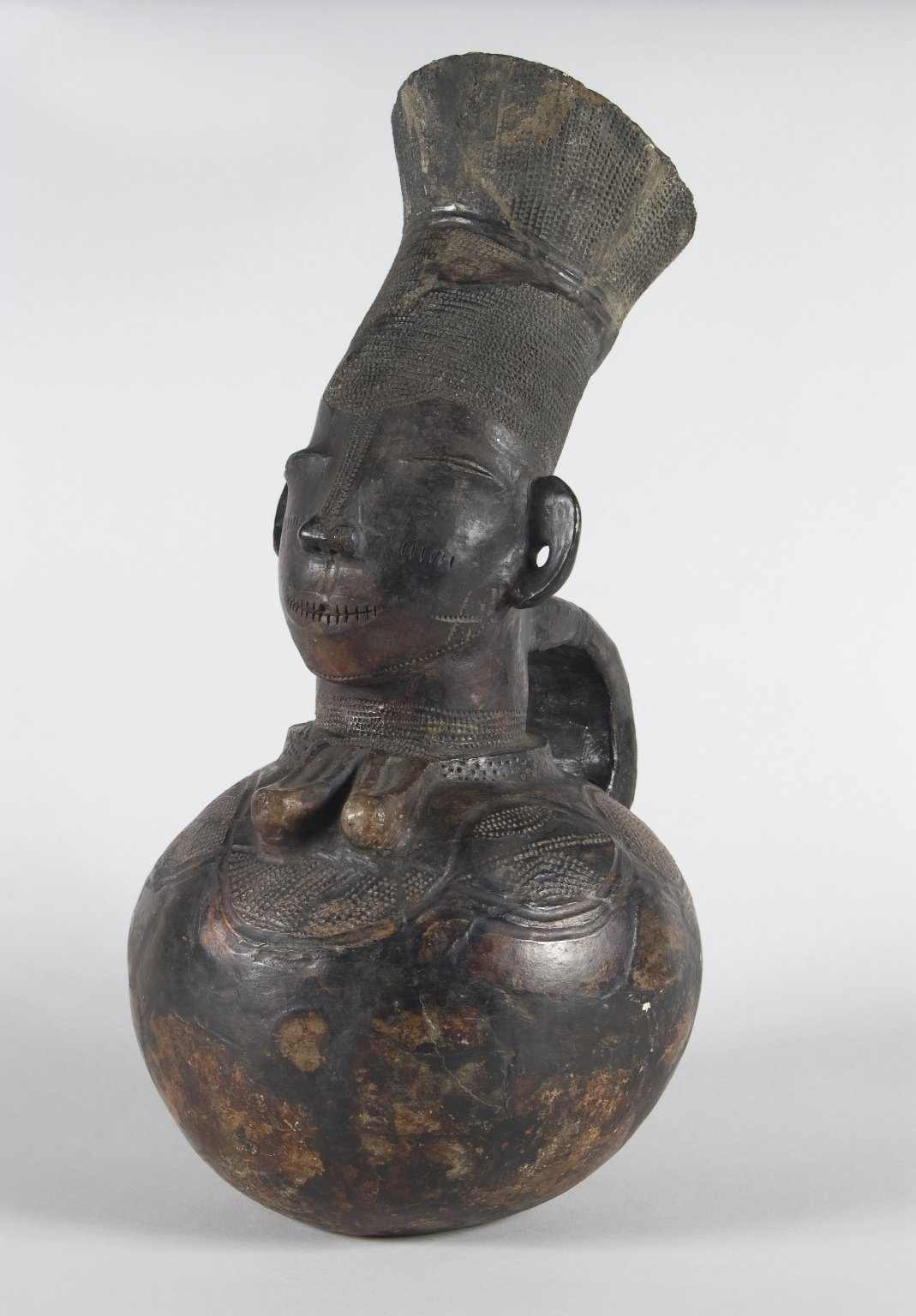
A Decorative Mangbetu Pot from the Brooklyn Museum

Mangbetu pottery is a tradition of ceramic production associated with the Mangbetu people of northeastern Democratic Republic of the Congo, mainly in the provinces of Haut-Uele and Tshopo. It includes everyday vessels used for domestic tasks as well as sculpted or decorated forms that may feature human or animal imagery. Mangbetu pottery is generally grouped into large utilitarian vessels (nembwo), smaller domestic pots, and decorated or anthropomorphic vessels used for storage, cooking, carrying, and decoration. The tradition is linked to other artistic practices in the region, including sculpture and other material arts.

== Background ==
The Mangbetu are an African ethnic group from the northeastern Democratic Republic of the Congo, living primarily in the provinces of Haut-Uele and Tshopo. The Mangbetu region lies between forest and savanna and has been influenced by interactions among different groups, such as Central Sudanic, Bantu, and Ubangian people. The Mangbetu are known for their distinctive artistic traditions, having produced a large variety of highly developed art and music, such as harps, guitars, pots, and other crafts.

Mangbetu artistic traditions were influenced by and shared with neighboring groups such as the Azande and Barambo. Consequently, works identified as Mangbetu art were not always produced exclusively by Mangbetu artists, but often reflect the broader cultural and political preeminence of the Mangbetu in the region.

The Mangbetu language, known as Kingbetu, is part of the Central Sudanic language family. The Mangbetu people are known for their elongated heads. Traditionally, infants’ soft skulls were bound during early development to shape them into an elongated form, a practice considered a sign of beauty and remains an important tradition in Mangbetu culture. This aesthetic standard is widely represented in Mangbetu visual art, including sculpture and pottery, where artists depicted elongated heads and elaborate coiffures reflecting contemporary standards of beauty.

Scholars have argued that increased European attention to Mangbetu portraiture and documentation during the early twentieth century may have influenced the production of anthropomorphic (human-shaped) imagery, including its appearance on ceramic vessels, as artists responded to external interest in representations of the human head.

Early European accounts of the Mangbetu were often romanticized and shaped by colonial perspectives, contributing to an exaggerated view of Mangbetu “artistic greatness” and decline that has since been reconsidered by historians.

== Purpose ==
The Mangbetu people produced three types of pots: the Large Pot (also known as nembwo), the Small Pot, and sculpted or decorated pots. The nembwo was used to serve general purposes, such as collecting water from the lake and carrying vegetables. The smaller pots were used for domestic tasks such as cooking, cleaning, and pouring. Some smaller vessels were also used for personal hygiene purposes.

In addition to these utilitarian forms, Mangbetu pottery also included anthropomorphic and sculpted vessels. These objects were not solely decorative; rather, they were also used as prestige items carried by "distinguished men" during travel as a sign of status. Decorative pots also functioned in political exchange systems, as chiefs used anthropomorphic vessels as diplomatic gifts to European officers to reinforce their reputation of men of importance. However, interpretations of the anthropomorphic forms have varied, with some earlier accounts emphasizing ritual or sacred importance, while more recent scholarship situates them within broader social and historical contexts. In the modern period, many Mangbetu anthropomorphic pots were removed from their original use and became museum and collector’s items, valued more for art than for function. The decorative pots were made for artistic purposes, and nowadays used as collector's items and can fetch a high price in art auctions.

== Shape ==
The nembwo and Small Pot have a rounded, spherical form with a cylindrical neck and no handles. Mangbetu utilitarian pots are structurally consistent, typically featuring a rounded base and simple body, though surface decoration may vary. In anthropomorphic vessels, the human figure is integrated into the form of the pot itself, with the opening often shaped as a coiffure and the head resting on a slender neck and rounded base. Some vessels also include added handles or protruding sculptural elements such as spikes around the neck or body, and each pot is formed by a unique combination of design elements.

== Adornment and color ==
Mangbetu pots are typically monochromatic, made entirely from clay and fired in its natural form without glazing. Many utilitarian pots have a dark, burnished surface, while some examples from different regions show variations in finish depending on clay treatment and firing methods. Decorative techniques include incision and surface texturing rather than applied color. Common motifs include incised patterns such as closely spaced lines, dots made with a patterned stamping tool (roulette tool), and deeply grooved designs that may form circular or curvilinear arrangements. These decorative elements often cover large portions of the vessel surface and may be combined with sculptural additions in anthropomorphic forms.

== Construction ==
Mangbetu women and men make their pots and jars using relatively coarse-textured clay entirely by hand, either by building the clay up in rings (ring construction) or using a variation of the hammer-and-anvil technique. Surfaces are smoothed and sometimes burnished before decoration is applied. They mold the heads and figures on the openings and handles, while surface patterns are created using small tools such as shell scrapers and roulette wheels, producing incised lines, dots, and grooved designs. Some vessels show repeated use of patterned roulettes that create textured bands across the surface. After the pottery is shaped and decorated, they are fired in open bonfires rather than kilns.

== See also ==
- Pottery
- Glossary of pottery terms
- Mangbetu people
- African art
