= Ndu language =

Ndu language may refer to:

- any language belonging to the Ndu languages of Papua New Guinea
- Ndo language, a language of Congo and Uganda
