= Mangbutu–Lese languages =

Central Sudanic language cluster

Mangbutu–Lese
- Mangbutu–Efe
- Geographic distribution: Democratic Republic of Congo, Uganda
- Linguistic classification: Nilo-Saharan?: Central Sudanic; Eastern; Mangbutu–Lese
- Subdivisions: Mangbutu; Mvuba; Ndo (Membitu); Mamvu; Lese (incl. Efe); ?Bendi

Language codes
- ISO 639-3: –
- Glottolog: memb1239

The Mangbutu–Lese languages of the Central Sudanic language family, also known as Mangbutu–Efe or simply Mangbutu (e.g. Starostin 2016), are a cluster of closely related languages spoken in the Democratic Republic of Congo and Uganda. Moru–Madi languages are spoken to the northeast, and Mangbetu languages are spoken to the west.

The languages are:

Mangbutu, Mvuba, Ndo, Mamvu, Lese, Bendi.

Efe (the language of the Efe Pygmies) is often counted as another, but appears to be a dialect of Lese. Ndo (Membitu) is the most populous language and is spoken by a caste of blacksmiths.

== See also ==
- Central Sudanic word lists (Wiktionary)
