= Bangweulu Batwa =

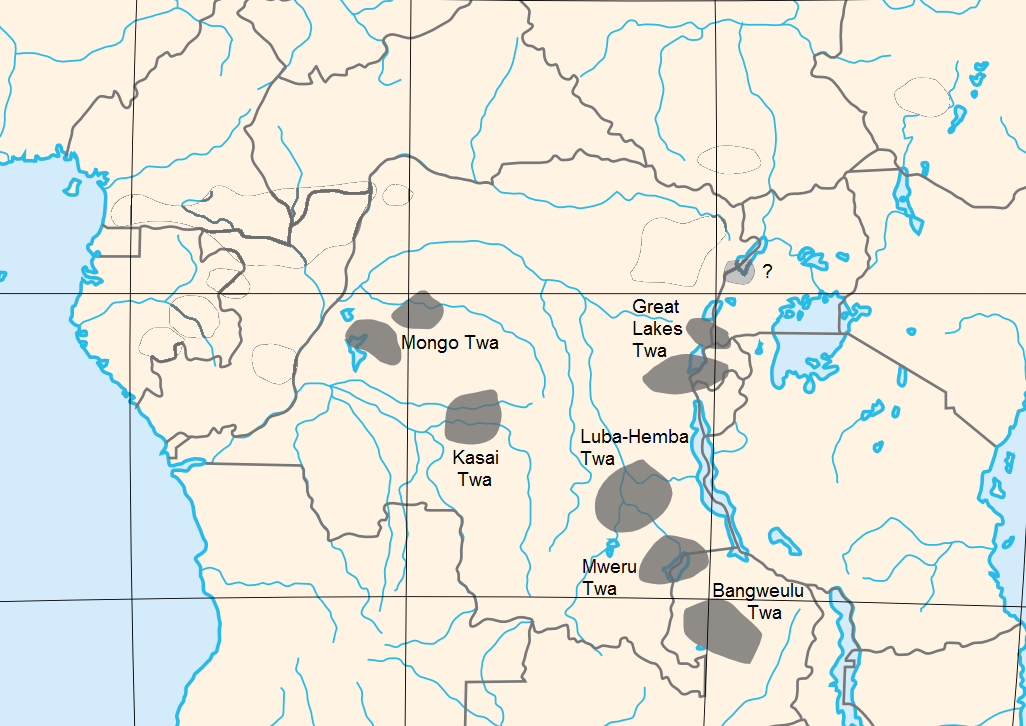
The Twa groups from Cavalli-Sforza's map of Pygmy populations.

Bangweulu Twa, or the BaTwa of the Bangweulu swamps, are one of several groups of Twa living in Zambia. Others are Kafwe Twa and Lukanga Twa. They are also known by the names BaTwa or Abatwa. While other Twa groups that are scattered across equatorial Africa are described as pygmy groups and averaging about 1.5 m (4 ft 11 in) in height, the Bangweulu Twa are described as taller and at least partly of Bantu origin but they may be the descendants of former hunter-gatherer groups.

After the coming of various outside Bantu groups to the area, groups of Twa moved to swamps and marsh land territories in Zambia. In descriptions from the early 20th century Bangweulu Twa are said to live off the land, they had no domestic animals but cultivated around ant-hills and on other raised patches. Through trade with inland neighbours they got meal and grain.

Batwa in the Bangweulu 1911–1912. Photo by Eric von Rosen.

== Eric von Rosen and the Bangweulu Twa ==
Eric von Rosen visited the Twa during his expedition in Bangweulu during 1911 and 1912 and calls them the "Swamp people". Von Rosen collected ethnographica and took photographs which are today in Sweden at the Museum of Ethnography in Stockholm and the Museum of World Culture in Gothenburg.

== After 1912 ==
After von Rosens expedition the Lake dwellers have been steadily moving to the main land. Sleeping-sickness did play an important part in this process.

== Lechwe-skin cloaks ==
The Bangweulu Batwa traditionally made cloaks from lechwe antelope skins, decorated with geometric and symbolic patterns. Men made the cloaks, which were worn by women known as Na Chimbusa, responsible for Mbusa knowledge and ritual practices. The Women’s History Museum of Zambia has documented the cloaks’ use as protective clothing and for carrying children. Eric von Rosen collected examples during his 1911–1912 expedition and subsequently donated them to the Museum of Ethnography in Stockholm. The Women's History Museum of Zambia and Sweden's National Museum of World Culture established Shared Histories, a collaboration intended to improve access to Zambian objects held in Swedish collections through digital documentation. Supported by the Swedish Institute, the project sought to supplement museum records with knowledge from the communities that produced and used the objects. Planned workshops with the Batwa did not proceed because of funding and logistical difficulties, and the cloaks were initially excluded from the digital repository because contextual information had not been gathered. As of July 2025, the cloaks remained in Sweden, the newly gathered information had not been added to the digital repository, and no formal request for physical repatriation had been made by the Batwa community or the Government of Zambia.
