= Asoa language =

Central Sudanic language spoken in DRC

Asoa
- Native to: Congo (DRC)
- Region: Ituri forest
- Ethnicity: Asua
- Native speakers: (26,000 cited 2000)
- Language family: Nilo-Saharan?: Central Sudanic; Eastern; Mangbetu; Asoa

Language codes
- ISO 639-3: asv
- Glottolog: asoa1238

Asoa, also known as Asua, Asuae, Asuati, or Aka, is a Central Sudanic language spoken by the Mbuti Pygmies known as the Asua. It is closely related to the Mangbetu language, and the Asua live in association with the Mangbetu people, among others. It is the only distinctive Pygmy language in the east.

Asua is spoken in the forests to the north of the Aruwimi River, between the Nepoko River and the headwaters of the Rubi River.
