= Kafwe Twa =

Ethnic groups

The Twa of the Kafue Flats wetlands of Zambia are one of several fishing and hunter-gatherer castes living in a patron-client relationship with farming Bantu peoples across central and southern Africa.

In Southern Province, where swampy terrain means that large-scale crops cannot be planted near the main rivers, only the Twa fish. They exchange their catch for agricultural produce from their Bantu/village patrons, the Tonga and perhaps the Ila, who build villages at the ecotone on the margins of the floodplain, which they call Butwa "Twa country".

The Kafue Twa have a dark-hut method of fishing unique in Africa. The sides of the river are covered with a thick mat of vegetation. The Twa raise a small reed platform about 3 square at the margin of the vegetation, with a tube in the center down to the water. They cover themselves and the tube with blankets, blocking out light as the adjacent vegetation does and enabling them to see the fish in the river clearly. They then spear the fish with bident and trident spears up to 6 m long, and occasionally longer, depending on the depth of the water. In the 1950s there were several hundred of these platforms raised in the Twa fishing grounds, and catches were reported to be over 100 kg per person per day when the fish were running.

Maho (2009) lists Kafue Twa as a dialect of Ila, Ethnologue of Tonga.

== See also ==
- Twa peoples
- Classification of Pygmy languages
