= Semliki harpoon =

The Semliki harpoon, also known as the Katanda harpoon, refers to a group of complex barbed harpoon heads carved from bone, which were found at an archaeologic site on the Semliki River in the Democratic Republic of the Congo (formerly Zaire); the artifacts date back approximately 90,000 years. The initial discovery of the first harpoon head was made in 1988. When the artifact was dated to 88,000 BCE, there was skepticism within the archaeological community about the accuracy of the stated age; in that the object seemed too advanced for human cultures of that era. However, the site has yielded multiple other examples of similar harpoons, and the dates have been confirmed.

It seemed to substantiate that fishing and an "aquatic civilization" was likely in the region across eastern and northern Africa during the wetter climatic conditions of the early to mid-Holocene, as shown by other evidence at the lakeshore site of Ishango.

The site is littered with catfish bones and the harpoons are the correct size to catch adult catfish, so investigators suspect the fisherman came to the site every year "to catch giant catfish."

It is unlikely that the harpoons are much different from those used today (see reference for photos).

The archaeologic site coincides with the range of the Efé Pygmies, which have been shown by mitochondrial DNA analyses to be of extremely ancient and distinct lineage.
