= Mbuti people =

Indigenous pygmy groups in the Congo region of Africa

Mbuti
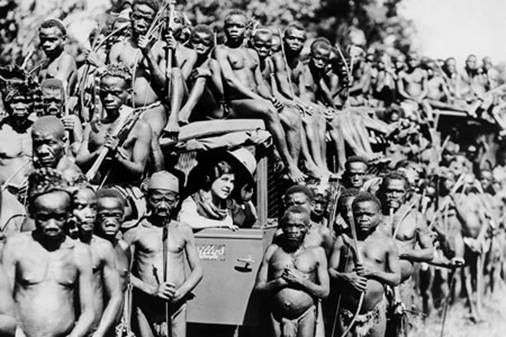
- A group of Mbuti, with American traveller Osa Johnson, in 1930

Total population
- 30,000 to 40,000

Regions with significant populations
- DR Congo

Languages
- Efe, Asoa, Kango, French

Religion
- Bambuti mythology, Christianity

Related ethnic groups
- African Pygmies

The Mbuti people, or Bambuti, are one of several indigenous groups in the Congo region of Africa. Their languages are Central Sudanic languages and Bantu languages.

== Subgroups ==
Bambuti are pygmy hunter-gatherers, and are one of the oldest indigenous people of the Congo region of Africa. The Bambuti are composed of bands which are relatively small in size, ranging from 15 to 60 people. The Bambuti population totals about 30,000 to 40,000 people. Many Batwa in various parts of the Democratic Republic of the Congo (DRC) also call themselves Bambuti.

There are three distinct subgroups:

- The Sua (also Kango, or Mbuti), who speak a dialect (or perhaps two) of the language of a neighboring Bantu people, Bila. They are located centrally and are eponymous of the larger group.
- The Efé, who speak the language of the neighboring Central Sudanic Lese.
- The Asua, speakers of the Mangbetu (Central Sudanic) Asua language.

== Environment ==
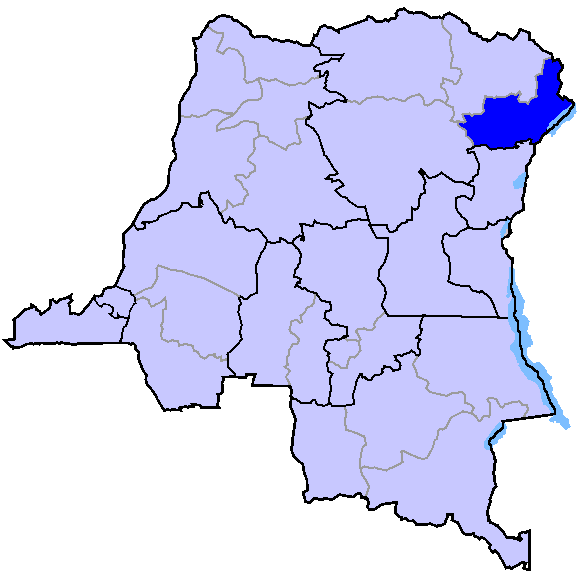
Map of Ituri Rainforest within the DRC

The Mbuti population live in the Ituri, a tropical rainforest covering about 63,000 km^{2} (24,000 square miles) of the north/northeast portion of the DRC. In this area, there is a high amount of rainfall annually, ranging from 1,300 to 1,800 mm (50 to 70 inches). The dry season is in January, and then May through August. The forest is a moist, humid region strewn with rivers and lakes. Several ecological problems exist which affect the Bambuti. Tropical disease is prevalent in the forests and can spread quickly, killing not only humans, but plants, and animals, the major source of food, as well. One disease, carried by tsetse flies, is sleeping sickness, which limits the use of large mammals. Too much rainfall, as well as droughts, can greatly diminish the food.

== Culture ==
=== Settlement, architecture and organization ===
The Bambuti live in villages that are categorized as bands. Each hut houses a family unit. At the start of the dry season, they leave the village to enter the forest and set up a series of camps. This way, the Bambuti are able to utilize more land area for maximum foraging. These villages are solitary and separated from other groups of people. Their houses are small, circular, and very temporary.

House construction begins with the tracing of them together. Large leaves and grass are used in the construction of the hut roofs.

=== Food and resources ===
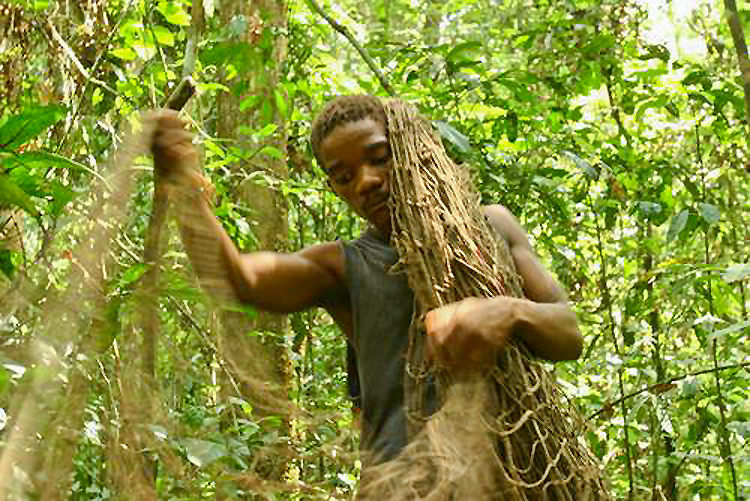
Mbuti net-hunter in Okapi Wildlife Reserve

The Bambuti are primarily hunter-gatherers. Their animal diet can include crabs, shellfish, ants, larvae, snails, wild pigs, antelopes, monkeys, fish, and honey. The vegetable component of their diet includes wild yams, berries, fruits, roots, leaves, and kola nuts.

The Bambuti have an elaborate system of food allowances and restrictions; foods that are restricted are called kweri. Food sources yielded by the forest are non-kweri animals for meat consumption, root plants, palm trees, and bananas; and in some seasons, wild honey. Yams, legumes, beans, peanuts, hibiscus, amaranth, and gourds are consumed. The Bambuti use large nets, traps, and bows and arrows to hunt game. Women and children sometimes assist in the hunt by driving the prey into the nets. Both sexes gather and forage. Each band has its own hunting ground, although boundaries are hard to maintain. The Mbuti call the forest "mother" and "father" as the mood seizes them, because, like their parents, the forest gives them food, shelter, and clothing, which are readily made from abundant forest materials.

The Bantu villagers produce many items that the hunter-gatherers trade some of their products for. They often obtain iron goods, pots, wooden goods, and basketry, in exchange for meat, animal hides, and other forest goods. Bushmeat is a particularly frequently traded item. They will also trade to obtain agricultural products from the villagers through barter.

Hunting is usually done in groups, with men, women, and children all aiding in the process. Women and children are not involved if the hunting involves the use of a bow and arrow, but if nets are used, it is common for everyone to participate. In some instances, women may hunt using a net more often than men. The women and the children herd the animals to the net, while the men guard the net. Everyone engages in foraging, and women and men both take care of the children. Women are in charge of cooking, cleaning and repairing the hut, and obtaining water. The kin-based units work together to provide food and care for the young. It is easier for men to lift the women into the trees for honey.

==== Food restrictions ====
According to a study published in 1987, based on fieldwork and data gathered between 1974 and 1985, the Mbuti restrict some 40% of the over 500 species of plants and animals they gather and hunt, including some 85% of the animals. The kweri animals are thought to cause disease and disorder, especially to young children; restrictions are gradually relaxed as one ages.

=== Kinship and descent system ===
The Bambuti tend to follow a patrilineal descent system, and their residences after marriage are patrilocal. However, the system is rather loose. The only type of group seen amongst the Bambuti is the nuclear family. Kinship also provides allies for each group of people.

=== Marriage customs ===
Sister exchange is the common form of marriage. Based on reciprocal exchange, men from other bands exchange sisters or other women to whom they have ties. In Bambuti society, bride wealth is not customary. There is no formal marriage ceremony: a couple are considered officially married when the groom presents his bride's parents with an antelope he alone has hunted and killed. Polygamy does occur, but at different rates depending on the group, and it is not very common. The sexual intercourse of married couples is regarded as an act entirely different from that of unmarried partners, for only in marriage may children be conceived.

=== Political structure ===
Bambuti societies have no ruling group or lineage, no overlying political organization, and little social structure. The Bambuti are an egalitarian society in which the band is the highest form of social organization. Leadership roles within the band may be displayed during certain group activities such as hunting treks. Men become leaders because they are good hunters. Owing to their superior hunting ability, leaders eat more meat and fat and fewer carbohydrates than other men. Men and women basically have equal power. Issues are discussed and decisions are made by consensus at fire camps; men and women engage in the conversations equivalently. If there is a disagreement, misdemeanor, or offense, then the offender may be banished, beaten, or scorned. In more recent times the practice is to remove the offender from the forest and have them work for private landowners for little to no pay.

=== Mythology ===
Everything in the Bambuti life is centered on the forest. They consider the forest to be their great protector and provider and believe that it is a sacred place. They sometimes call the forest "mother" or "father". An important ritual that impacts the Bambuti's life is referred to as molimo. After events such as death of an important person in the tribe, molimo is noisily celebrated to wake the forest, in the belief that if bad things are happening to its children, it must be asleep. As with many Bambuti rituals, the time it takes to complete a molimo is not rigidly set; instead, it is determined by the mood of the group. Food is collected from each hut to feed the molimo, and in the evening the ritual is accompanied by the men dancing and singing around the fire. Women and children must remain in their huts with the doors closed. These practices were studied thoroughly by British anthropologist Colin Turnbull, known primarily for his work with the tribe.

"Molimo" is also the name of a trumpet the men play during the ritual. Traditionally, it was made of wood or sometimes bamboo, but Turnbull also reported the use of metal drainpipes. The sound produced by a molimo is considered more important than the material it is made out of. When not in use, the trumpet is stored in the trees of the forest. During a celebration, the trumpet is retrieved by the youth of the village and carried back to the fire.

== Contemporary situation ==
The way of life of the Bambuti is threatened for various reasons. Their territory in the DRC has no legal protections, and the boundaries that each band claims are not formally established. Bambuti are no longer allowed to hunt large game. Due to deforestation, gold mining, and modern influences from plantations, agriculturalists, and efforts to conserve the forests, their food supply is threatened. There is also significant civil unrest in the country.

The Bambuti have also been targets of a genocide campaign known as Effacer le tableau.

== Genetics ==
Y-chromosomal haplogroup E-M200 has been found in 25% (3/12) of a small sample of Mbuti from the Democratic Republic of the Congo. Haplogroup B-P7 has been observed most frequently in samples of some populations of pygmies 21% (10/47) Mbuti from Democratic Republic of the Congo.

== Languages ==
There are three distinct languages spoken by the Mbuti:

- Kango, a Bantu Zone D language related to Bila
- Efe, a Mangbutu language related to Lese
- Asua language, a Mangbetu language

Efe and Asua are Central Sudanic languages, while Kango is a Niger–Congo language.

=== Comparative vocabulary ===
Bantu and Central Sudanic comparative lexicon of Ituri languages:

Gloss	Proto-Bantu	Ndààká	Mbò	Bàlí	Lìkó	Bila	Kángò	ɛ́fɛ́	Lese	Mamvu
bee	*júkì	ngùngù	ngùngù	nzóló	nzɔ́	njòkí	nzòkí	idi	ìdì	ìdì
mouth	*nùà	nù	nù	nɔ̀kù	tùlù	njòkò	nyɔ̀kɔ̀	ùʈì	ùʈì	ùʈì
arm	*bòkò	bɔ̀kɔ̀	kɔ́ndɔ́	bɔ́kɔ̀	bɔ́kúkɔ̀	mbómbó	kɔ́ndɔ̀	ʈòʔù	ʈòhù	tòqù
dog	*búà	vá	vá	vá	vá	mbwá	vá	īɓū	īɓū	ìɓú
to cultivate	*dìm	ìmà	lìmà	dɛ̀mɛ̀	dìmá	tèmá	tɛ́ɛ́myá	ùsú	ùsú	ìqʊ̄
to dance	*b̩ìn	búnò	nìjò	ìnè	bínó	bínò	kìyá	ɔ̀ɓɛ̄	ɔ̀ɓɛ̄	ɔ̀ɓɛ̄
tooth	*j̩ínò	yénù	lénú	nwà	lǎnwù	mìnyò	nyɔ̀	ùsɛ́	úsɛ́	ūsɛ́
water	*d̩ìbà	ípó	ípó	bó	bó	líbó	bá	úū	úū	úū
child	*jánà	àná	àná	sí	kí	míkí	níkí	ádī	ádī	mūngú
arrow	*gùì	gùsà	gùsà	ngùlé	wàgásù	ápì	pì	àpì	àpì	èbī
knee	*dú̩	hú	lúlú	lùlú	líkò	mòákù	kúsú	gbɔ̀rɔ̀	gbɔ̀rɔ̀	ngbòrò
man	*ntù	gùwè	gùwè	mɛ̀tù	tú	tùwá	ùkú	āqɓí	ágbī	áfū
moon	*jéì̩	lí	lí	lí	sìnzì	sóngè	lí	tèbá	tèbá	tèmbá
house	*dǎkù	kàà	kàà	ndàbò	ndàbʊ̀	éndú	àndú	āí	àí	ùyá
nose	*júdù	màó	lùlú	míɔ̀	sɔ́ngʊ́	élò	ɛ̀lɔ́	ʈɔ̀gí	ʈɔ̀gí	ʈɔ̀njí
black	*jínà	ìnó	ìná	dìmbè	línò	àhí	ínà	ákɔ̄gù	ákɔ̄gù	qó
eye	*jícò	ìsó	ìsó	ìsó	ìsó	ùsó	ùsá	éʔí	éhí	ɛ̄qɛ̄
ear	*tú̩ì̩	cwéí	cwéí	tóì	tílíkò	tóì	tóí	ɔ̀gì	ɔ̀gì	ɔ̀njì
bone	*kú̩pà	wó	wó	kùò	kùò	kùà	kúwà	īgbì	ígbī	ífù
skin/bark	*kòbà	pàpì	pàsì	pàsì	ìkó		pàsí	ɛ̀gbā	ɛ̀gbā	qàɓū
rain	*bú̩dà	gbàá	gbàá	mbúlò	mbwáì	mvúù	mbúà	ūbvī	tìbō	tìɓō
heart	*ti̩má	tímá	túmá	lómà	mbɛ̀ngí	moyo	kámìnà	ɓòrù	ɓòrù	ɓòrù

Some Bantu and Central Sudanic animal names of Ituri languages:

Gloss	Bali	Bila	Sua Bila	Bodo	Tshwa Bodo	Ndaaka	Kango	Asua	Efe	Lese
chimpanzee	bebeleko	seko	seko	ngole	tobe	ngoe	sekɔ	ozue	ndatɔ	dato
leopard	loli	moli	moli	kuei	biti	kuei	mapiti	kaʔwa	ʔau	kaʔu
hyrax	ngoyɔ	soka	toku	kpaa	soka	ngoya	koasa	ndɔka	yama	yama
elephant	mbongo	mbongo	ndopo	toku	mbongo		bepe	ukɔɛ	ʊʔʊ	uku
buffalo	tibi	njali	njali	ndopo	nzale		nzale	kibiyɛ	tupi	tupi
okapi	ndumbo	mbote	mbote	mundembe	undembe	undembe	mundembe	ndumbaɛ	oʔapi	okapi

== See also ==
- Ota Benga (c. 1883–1916), Mbuti man taken to the United States
