= Bolia people =

Mongo ethnic group

Bolia
Languages
- Bolia

Related ethnic groups
- Mongo

The Bolia, or Bulia, also called Lia Twa or Lia, are a subgroup of the Mongo Twa living on the north side of Lake Mai-Ndombe. They coinhabit the land with a minority pygmy population.

== Bolia Kingdom ==
The Bolia people established the Bolia Kingdom east of Lake Mai-Ndombe. According to historian Christopher Ehret, this was established sometime in the 12th or perhaps as early as the 11th century, though other scholars, such as John Thornton, claim it may have been founded as late as the early 18th century based on oral sources of the Bolia people. After defeating the Bozanga Kingdom, they took control over the entirety of Lake Mai-Ndombe and encroached southward to the Ngeliboma Kingdom, who they competed with for much of the 18th century. According to the Moravian missionary Christian Georg Andreas Oldendorp in 1767, Bolia was split between three territories, each with their own ruler: Cando, Colambo, and Bongolo. They frequently warred against each other, though the Bolia kings (whom they feared) had the power to stop these wars. Despite the infighting, Bolia continued to wage wars with their neighbors, such as Ngeliboma, whom they invaded and pillaged around 1760, withdrawing and leaving it in ruins. Around 1800, Ngeliboma invaded Bolia and took their capital, but a Bolia counterattack defeated them and forced the Ngeliboma forces out of their lands.
