= Bendi language (Central Sudanic) =

Central Sudanic language spoken in DR Congo

Bendi
- Native to: Congo (DRC)
- Native speakers: (32,000 cited 1991)
- Language family: Nilo-Saharan?: Central Sudanic; Eastern; Mangbutu–Lese; Bendi

Language codes
- ISO 639-3: bct
- Glottolog: bend1260

Bendi (Mabendi) is a Central Sudanic language of northeastern Congo.
