= Bila language =

Bantu language of the northeastern DR Congo

Bila
- Forest Bira
- Kango, Sua
- Native to: Democratic Republic of the Congo
- Region: Ituri forest
- Ethnicity: Kango (Wochua?)
- Native speakers: (40,000 cited 1993–1998)
- Language family: Niger–Congo?: Atlantic–Congo; Benue–Congo; Bantoid; Bantu (Zone D.20–30); Boan; Bomokandian; Biran; Bila
- Dialects: Kango (1,000); Sua (1,000); Bombi-Ngbanja; Nyaku; Ibutu

Language codes
- ISO 639-3: Either: bip – Bila kzy – Kango–Sua
- Glottolog: bila1255 Bila kang1285 Kango belu1239 Belueli
- Guthrie code: D.211,311,313

Bila, or Forest Bira, is a Bantu language spoken in the Mambasa Territory of the Democratic Republic of Congo. It is also spoken by the Mbuti Pygmies who live in that area. Pygmy groups to the west include the Kango and Sua (Batchua). Other Mbuti speak Central Sudanic languages. The Kango and Sua speak distinct dialects (southern and northern), but not enough to impair mutual intelligibility with their farming Bila patrons.

Maho (2009) lists Ibutu (Mbuttu, D.313) as a distinct language.

== Phonology ==
=== Consonants ===
		Bilabial	Alveolar	Palatal	Velar	Labio- velar	Glottal
Nasal		m	n	ɲ			
Plosive/ Affricate	plain	p	t	t͡ʃ	k	k͡p	
Plosive/ Affricate	prenasalized	ᵐb	ⁿd	ᶮd͡ʒ	ᵑɡ	ᵑᵐɡ͡b	
Plosive/ Affricate	implosive	ɓ	ɗ				
Fricative		ɸ	s				h
Lateral			l				
Semivowel				j		w	

=== Vowels ===
	Front	Central	Back
Close	i		u
Near-close	ɪ		ʊ
Close-mid	e		o
Open-mid	ɛ		ɔ
Open		a	
