= Mangbutu language =

Central Sudanic language of DR Congo

Mangbutu
- Region: Congo (DRC)
- Native speakers: (15,000 cited 1991)
- Language family: Nilo-Saharan?: Central Sudanic; Eastern; Mangbutu–Lese; Mangbutu

Language codes
- ISO 639-3: mdk
- Glottolog: mang1396

Mangbutu is a Central Sudanic language of northeastern Congo. It, or its speakers, are also known as Mangu-Ngutu, Mombuttu, Wambutu. The 1,200 Andinai are separated from other Mangbutu speakers by Lese; they speak a distinct dialect, as do the Andali tribe (Angwe dialect).

Mangbutu is spoken in Watsa Territory.
