= Lukanga Twa =

The Twa of the Lukanga Swamp of Zambia are one of several fishing and hunter-gatherer castes living in a patron–client relationship with farming Bantu peoples across central and southern Africa. The Lukanga Twa live primarily among the Lenje, and speak the Lenje language.

In Southern Province, where swampy terrain means that large-scale crops cannot be planted near the main rivers, only the Twa fish. They exchanged their catch for agricultural produce from their patrons. Up to the 1920s the Twa built their huts on the marshes, but they were moved to higher ground for ease of taxation. By the 1970s many of the Twa identified as Lenje, and consequently abandoned fishing, as the Lenje have a strong cultural aversion to that activity. They have been replaced by immigrants to the region, primarily Luvale and Malawians.

== See also ==
- Twa peoples
- Classification of Pygmy languages
