= Efé people =

Pygmy people of the Ituri Rainforest of the DRC

The Efé are a group of part-time hunter-gatherer people living in the Ituri Rainforest of the Democratic Republic of Congo. In the depths of the forest they do not wear much clothing, using only leaf huts as shelter for their bodies in the intense heat. The Efé are Pygmies, and one of the shortest peoples in the world. The men grow to an average height of 142 cm (4 ft. 8 in.), and women tend to be about 5 cm (2 in.) shorter.

Dr. Jean-Pierre Hallet was very involved with the Efé, from raising awareness to the plight of the tribe, to the introduction of new foods and methods previously unknown (such as a legume called the "winged bean" of New Guinea). He also introduced new methods of farming to the Efé, who likely had been a hunter-gatherer society for many thousands of years.

== Origins ==
The Efé (and other Western pygmy groups) show genetic evidence of an early genetic divergence from neighboring groups. The Semliki harpoon, 90,000 years old, is one of the oldest known human tools and was found in the current range of the Efé pygmies. This suggests an initial aquatic civilisation based on fishing. Jean-Pierre Hallet promoted the establishment of a sanctuary for the Efé along the Semliki River near Virunga National Park, and also lobbied heavily for the rights of the semi-nomadic pygmies to continue living in the protected Okapi Wildlife Reserve in the Ituri Forest.

== Location and overview ==
The Efé are one of three groups of pygmies, collectively named BaMbuti, of the Ituri forest of the Democratic Republic of Congo. The other groups are the Sua, and the Aka. Of these, the Efé occupy the most land, from the north to the southeast of the forest. One of the main ways in which these groups are distinguished is by the neighbouring non-pygmy tribes with whom they cooperate. The Efé, who differ from other pygmy groups in that they hunt with bows and arrows instead of nets, are associated with the Lese people. The Efé language is essentially identical to that of the Lese, and is Central Sudanic in origin. (The pygmy groups in the region generally speak the language of the tribes with whom they associate.)

== History and external influences ==
There is some debate over how long the Efé have lived in their present state, with accounts of their having been in the Ituri forest for 20,000 years. Bailey states that the Ituri area has been inhabited since 40,700 BC, but that the region was most likely savannah and temperate forest (as opposed to rainforest) until somewhere between 2900 and 720 BC.

His analyses suggest that hunter-gathering is not a sufficient source of caloric intake alone, so that some form of agricultural pursuits were likely and that the civilization probably developed at the border of the savannah and the rainforest, rather than in the forest itself. Net hunting by other pygmy tribes, however, seem to provide higher caloric intake than the bow and arrow hunting of the Efé.

Some suggestions as to the evolutionary benefit of the pygmy short stature was the ability to navigate the dense jungle, with its low hanging branches, more easily. Small stature also confers a small advantage for body heat dissipation in equatorial (hot, humid) regions. (While there are pygmy peoples in colder climates as well, this may have occurred by migration.)

Arab slave raids, especially from the 1850s until the 1890s, served to destabilise the region. Trade routes were opened up, and a common dialect called Kingwana (a Congo variant of Kiswahili, also known as Copperbelt Swahili) was introduced. New crops, firearms, and hut designs were also introduced during that time. The Efé assumed roles as watchmen for the Lese against the slavers.

Belgian Congo was established in 1908, and the Belgian colonial government played a role in shaping the lives of the Efé and Lese. Chiefdoms among the Lese were formalised and police forces were created with Lese policemen. These supervised the work projects of the colonial administration: primarily the construction of three main roads in the Ituri region. Whole villages of Lese and Efé were relocated alongside these roads in these work projects, and new crops were planted for sale as well as for village use. The structure of these roadside villages and the resultant behaviour of the Efé differed significantly from their forest villages.

When Congo became independent from Belgium on June 30, 1960, the Ituri region began to fall into decay. The dictatorship of Mobutu that soon followed independence followed a practice of neglect for the region, allowing the roads to fall into disrepair. "...We have no roads, we have no insurrection" was one of his favourite sayings. In 1997 he died of prostate cancer and the rebel army of Laurent Kabila took control of the country in the First Congo War. This was soon followed by Rwandan and Ugandan invasions of the Eastern Congo in the Second Congo War. Congolese militias known as Mai Mai also sprang up and began fighting in this conflict, and the Ituri region was one of the areas most affected by this conflict, the largest in Africa.

== Economic and cultural features ==
The Efé are primarily a foraging society, but they do sometimes perform wage labour for the Lese villagers. Efé men hunt and gather honey while the women gather food like berries and fish.

Recently, the Ituri forest has been logged at a tremendous rate, and Efé have been hired to assist with the logging.

== Attaining necessities ==
Hunting is a primary way in which Efé men contribute to the food supply of the tribe, which they were observed doing 21.1% of the time during 12-hour observation days. They hunt either alone or in groups, using either spears or bows and arrows (the arrows may be iron-tipped or poison-tipped, depending on the type of prey). Monkeys are hunted alone using poison-tipped arrows, which is done by solitary hunters who locate groups of monkeys feeding in trees and stand where they think the monkeys will move. Once they are within 21 metres (70 ft), an Efé archer fires several arrows and, if he hits one of the monkeys, he will either try to follow it up to 100 metres (330 ft) through the forest (waiting for the poison to set in), or he will return later (the same day or the next morning) in order to bring it back to camp. Poison-tipped arrows are labour-intensive to make (the poisonous roots and vines have to be gathered and then crushed up to turn them into a juice that can be used to coat the arrow tip), and are made in batches of about 75, with about 5.9 minutes spent on each arrow. Duikers (a type of antelope) are hunted either in groups or ambushed alone from trees with iron-tipped arrows. The ambush hunts are called ebaka, and they are performed by building perches in fruit trees from which the duikers eat dropped fruits and waiting there during feeding hours, which are early morning and late afternoon. If the hunter hits a duiker, he will jump out of the 2.5- to 3-metre perch and chase it, and call the dogs to join him. Sometimes, though, the animal gets away, since they can run the distance of several football fields away in the dense forest, even wounded. Group hunts, which are called mota, take place with between 4 and 30 men who use either spears for large animals (like forest buffalo and elephants) or iron-tipped arrows for duikers, other species of antelope, and water chevrotain. They also use their dogs to drive game out of their hiding and/or sleeping places and to chase down wounded animals.

Another exclusively male task is to gather honey, which takes place from June through September. Honey season, however, can last until November if it is a particularly plentiful season. Women perform most tasks unrelated to hunting and honey-gathering. These include gathering firewood and water, which women do about 5 per cent of the time. Generally, they do this with at least one other person, very occasionally a man. Gathering forest foods, namely fruits, nuts, tubers, mushrooms, caterpillars, and termites takes up a lot of their time, as does labouring in the villages. Women also spend 17% of their time preparing food, and are almost solely responsible for maintaining the camp.

== Family life ==
One interesting feature of the family life of the Efé is the degree of cooperation involved in caring for children, particularly babies. Sometimes Efé infants will even be nursed by a woman other than the mother if the mother's milk has not come in yet. Other women help more in caretaking than the baby's father, and studies indicate that Efé babies spend just 40% of their time with their mothers and are switched around between caretakers 8.3 times per hour, with about 14 people looking after the infant on average in 8 hours of observation. Also notable is the fact that children constitute only a quarter to a third of the population, and nearly half of women have either no or one child during their lifetime.

The Efé ideal is to marry by sister exchange, but this happens for only 40 per cent of men. There is no bridewealth and very little bride service. The Efé are not allowed to marry anyone related to their grandfathers, and they trace their heritage patrilineally. Generally, residence is patrilocal and the composition of camps roughly follows that of a patriclan.

== Relationship to the Lese ==
The Efé can be said to live in cooperation with the Lese, who live in villages of between fifteen and a hundred people and grow their food. The Efé make their camps on the outskirts of the forest near a Lese village for about seven months of the year (save for the best hunting season, January through March, and honey season), and are never more than eight hours away on foot from a village. The Efé generally trade the meat and honey they acquire in the forest for material goods or the cassava, bananas, peanuts, and rice grown by the Lese, and the meat provided by the Efé accounts for over half of the meat eaten by the Lese. Important goods that the Lese villagers provide for the Efé are tobacco and marijuana, which about half of men and a third of women smoke. In addition to trading meat and honey with the villagers, Efé men and women also provide their labour in exchange for foods, tobacco, marijuana, iron, cloth or other material goods. Women do this about 9.6% of their time, usually helping to plant, harvest, and prepare the food from Lese gardens in return for food from the garden. Efé men, on the other hand, mostly perform work related to clearing fields in December, and spend about 3.5% of their time doing it. They are usually paid with cooked food, some of which they eat right away and some of which they bring back to camp with them; but they are also occasionally paid with marijuana or tobacco. Men spend more time in the villages doing things other than working, like drinking palm wine with the villagers and generally socializing. Lese and Efé men even establish partnerships, which can be inherited and constitute a special bond between a Lese and an Efé man. However, these partnerships can be dissolved when an Efé man returns borrowed items to his Lese partner.

One aspect of the Lese–Efé relationship that is less than cooperative is the way in which they view each other. Efé often steal from Lese gardens, particularly around April and May when there is little food and the Lese are ungenerous about payment for Efé labor.

The Lese, on the other hand, view the Efé with something of a condescending attitude and see themselves as entirely separate entities. Efé are viewed by Lese men and women alike as being female. The Lese also see strict dichotomies between themselves and the Efé – they characterize the Efé as uneducated savages and see themselves as more civilized since they go to school and live in villages. Another interesting image they create is that of red versus white – the Efé and the meat and honey they provide are described as red, and the goods the Lese provide (dried corn, cassava, etc.) are closer to white in colour. However, Lese men describe Efé men as "devoted friends and protectors" and also find Efé women "stronger, more sexually attractive, and more fertile than Lese women". The Lese also believe that the Efé can hunt witches and protect the village from them.

== Religion ==
It is rather difficult to accurately describe the Efé religion, as there is not a great deal of information that deals specifically with the Efé. The main source used was a collection of Bambuti legends, i.e. legends that the author felt belonged to some extent to all of the pygmy groups of the Ituri forest, but the tribe from whom the legends were gathered were one of the net-hunting groups, not the Efé. Because of the lack of information, it seems imprudent to relay any of the specific legends. The legends, though, tend to fall into three categories: “creation myths; legends of origin and tradition, legends dealing with social relations, and legends dealing with relations with the supernatural".

Another interesting aspect of Efé religion is that it is also shared with the Lese. Many of pygmy legends deal with their larger partners, and the associated tribes have myths dealing with the pygmies. Even some religious ceremonies are held in common, such as the ima celebration in which girls who have reached menarche and been secluded in a hut together are carried back out into the village. Bailey describes the period of seclusion as being three months, but Grinker states that it is more like six months to a year and that the girls’ feet are not allowed to touch the ground without being wrapped in palm leaves and that whenever they have to use the bathroom, they must be carried to an outhouse wrapped in palm leaves so that the sun does not touch them. This period is also supposed to make the girls fat, and they are supposed to consume a lot of palm oil and meat while they are being sequestered.

== Language ==
The Efé speak Lese without significant distinctions from the Lese themselves, though notably, the phoneme /kp/ has the allophone [kʙ̥] only in the Efé dialect.

They also have a relationship with other farming peoples in the region: the Mamvu and Mvuba (close relatives of Lese) and the Bantu Bira, Nyali, and Nande.

== Bibliography ==
- Bailey, Robert C. (1991). The Behavioral Ecology of Efé Pygmy Men in the Ituri Forest, Zaire. Ann Arbor, Michigan: University of Michigan Press. doi:10.3998/mpub.11396267. ISBN 978-1-949098-86-0. JSTOR 10.3998/mpub.11396267.
- Bahuchet, Serge (10 August 2006). Languages of the African Rainforest 'Pygmy' Hunter-Gatherers: Language Shifts without Cultural Admixture (PDF). Historical linguistics and hunter-gatherers populations in global perspective. Leipzig, Germany: Max-Planck Inst., Leipzig.
- Demolin, Didier; Teston, Bernard (September 1997). "Phonetic characteristics of double articulations in some Mangbutu-Efe languages" (PDF). International Speech Communication Association: 803–806.
- Diamond, Jared (1 May 1992). "Why are Pygmies smaller than other people?". Discover Magazine.
- Foldvari, Fred E. (November 1998). "Save the Efe Pygmies in Africa". Malibu, CA: The Pygmy Fund. Archived from the original on 2007-07-05.
- Foundation Pygmy (2007-02-21). "Increase in Forest Cutting Speed in Eastern Ituri Forest, DR Congo" (PDF). Kleinood, Netherlands: Foundation Pygmy. Archived from the original (PDF) on 2007-09-28.
- Gordon, Raymond G. Jr. (1991). "Efé: A language of the Democratic Republic of the Congo". Dallas, USA: Ethnologue.
- Grinker, Roy Richard (1990). "Images of Denigration: Structuring Inequality between Foragers and Farmers in the Ituri Forest, Zaire". American Ethnologist. 17 (1): 111–130. doi:10.1525/ae.1990.17.1.02a00070. ISSN 0094-0496. JSTOR 645255.
- Grinker, Roy Richard (1994). "Houses in the Rainforest". Berkeley: University of California Press.
- Hallet, Jean-Pierre (1965). "Congo Kitabu". New York: Random House.
- Hewlett, Barry S. (1989). "Multiple Caretaking Among African Pygmies" (PDF). American Anthropologist. 91 (1): 186–191. doi:10.1525/aa.1989.91.1.02a00190. ISSN 0002-7294. JSTOR 679753.
- Turnbull, Colin M. (January 1959). "Legends of the BaMbuti". Journal of the Royal Anthropological Institute. 89 (1): 45–60. doi:10.2307/2844436. ISSN 0307-3114. JSTOR 2844436.
- Veeramah; et al. (2012). "An Early Divergence of KhoeSan Ancestors from Those of Other Modern Humans Is Supported by an ABC-Based Analysis of Autosomal Resequencing Data".
- Wilkie, David S. (1999). "What chance for self-determination? – farmers and foragers in the forest of northeastern Democratic Republic of Congo" (PDF). Waltham, MA: Ituri Forest Peoples Fund. Archived from the original (PDF) on 2006-10-11.
- Wilkie, David S. (2005-03-15). "Ituri Forest Peoples Fund: Assisting Indigenous Peoples in Conflict Areas". Cambridge, MA: Cultural Survival Quarterly. Archived from the original on 2007-09-28.
- Wilkie, David S.; Morelli, Gilda A. (September 2000). "Forest Foragers: A Day in the Life of Efe Pygmies in the Democratic Republic of Congo".
