= Lenje people =

Ethnic group in Zambia

Lenje
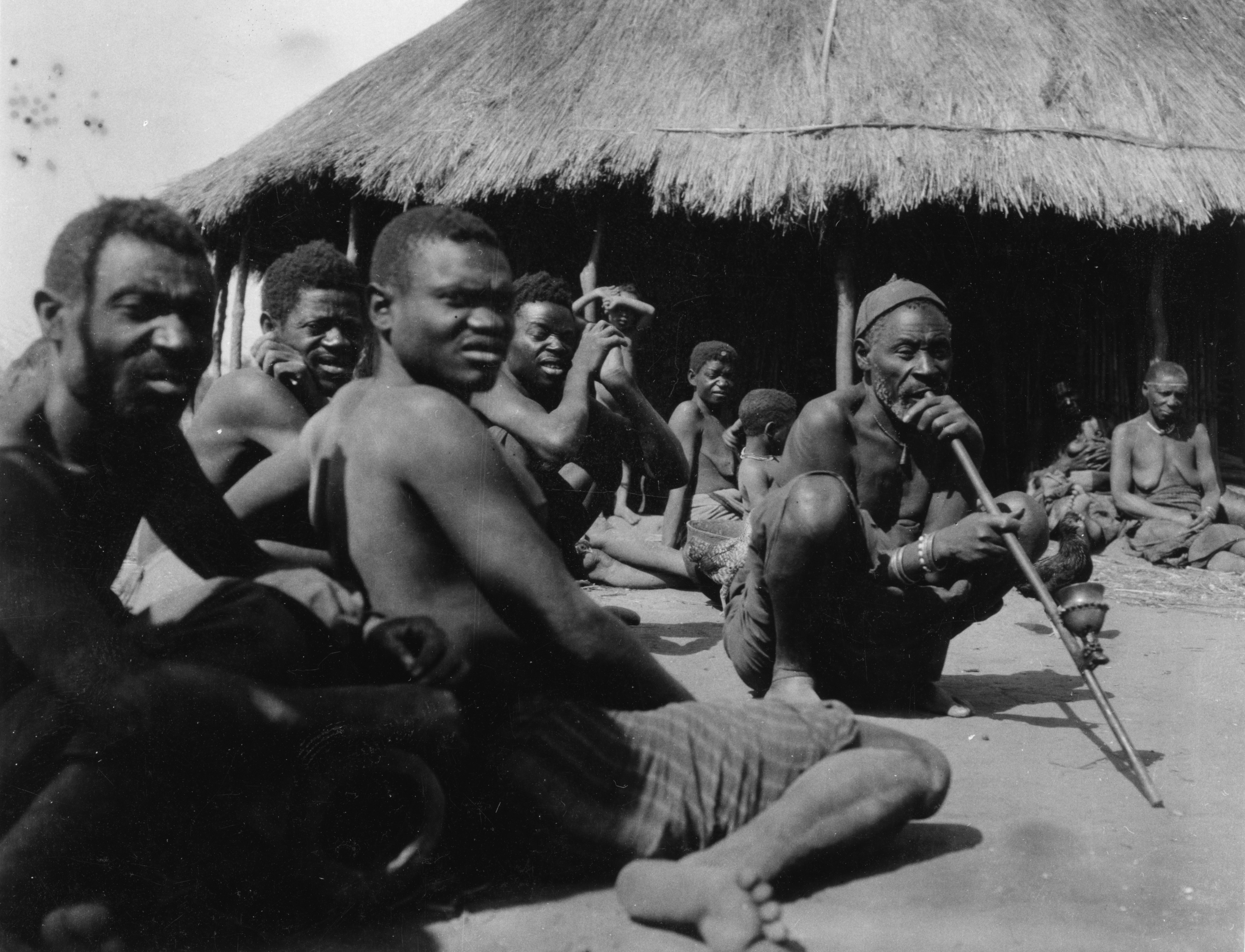
- Lenje chief smokes pipe. Photo by Eric von Rosen 1911-1912.

Total population
- 310 000 in Zambia

Languages
- Lenje, English

Related ethnic groups
- Lukanga Twa, Tonga people

Lenje people (also known as Bene Mukuni, Balenje, Balenge, Benimukuni, Ciina mukuna, Lenge, Lengi) is an ethnic group in Zambia. They are loosely bound with its spatial and cultural boundaries shifting, depending on whom you talk to. They live mainly in the Central province but also in Lusaka and Copperbelt province. It is not clear when they arrived to the area where they live today but they are believed to be among the first people to come to Zambia from the Cameroon region. It has been claimed that they have been in the area at least since the 17th century. The Lenje chiefdom comprises one senior chief and seven subordinate chiefs and chiefdoms. They are about 240 000 - 310 000, and are related to the neighboring Tonga people and have also been said to be related to the Twa (or Batwa, Awatwa) of the Lukanga Swamps.

== Subsistence ==
Travellers who visited Lenje in the beginning of the 20th century writes that they were mainly farmers but hunting and fishing was also important. Present day Lenje are generally subsistence farmers growing maize during the rainy season and vegetables during the dry season, They burn charcoal as well as keep a few cattle, goats, chickens etc. Some, especially those closer to the edge of the Lukanga swamp, fish or are involved in fish trade.
