= Ndo language =

Central Sudanic language

Ndo
- Ke’bu
- Membitu
- Native to: Congo (DRC), Uganda
- Native speakers: (100,000 in DRC cited 1991); 50,000 in Uganda (2014 census)
- Language family: Nilo-Saharan?: Central Sudanic; Eastern; Mangbutu–Lese; Ndo

Language codes
- ISO 639-3: ndp
- Glottolog: ndoo1242

Ndo, also Ke’bu, Kebu, or Membitu, is a Central Sudanic language of northeastern Congo and western Uganda spoken by a caste of blacksmiths.
