= Katarína Brychtová =

Slovak actress and television presenter

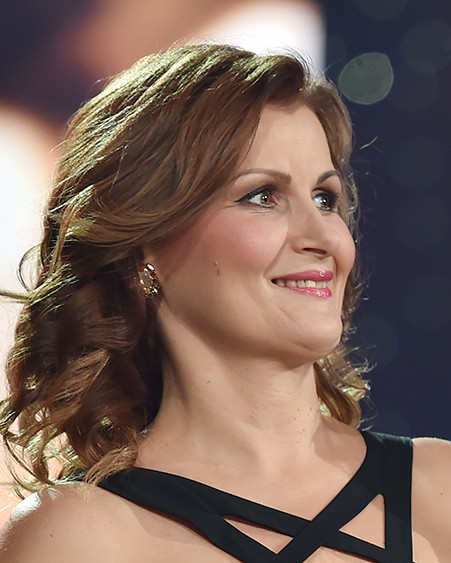
- Born: 22 May 1967 (age 58); Bratislava, Czechoslovakia
- Occupations: Actress, television presenter
- Spouse: Ivan Brychta
- Children: 2

Katarína Brychtová née Šebestová (born 22 May 1967) is a Slovak actress and television presenter.

== Filmography ==
- 1990: Sila lásky (TV film)
- 1994: Vášnivé známosti
- 2009: ko som prežil Dobrý synček
- 2009: Panelák
- 2013: Hlavne, že sa máme radi...
