= Asoa people =

Mbuti pygmy people

The Asua or Asoa, also known as the Aka, are an Mbuti pygmy people of the Ituri forest. They speak a Central Sudanic language, Asuati, and are the only Pygmy group in the east to have their own language, though it is closely related to Mangbetu.

The Asua have a patron–vassal relationship with several neighboring peoples, including, the Malele, Meegye, Makere, Popoyi, Mangbetu, and Abulu (all Central Sudanic) and the Liko and Ndaka (both Bantu).
