= Mvuba language =

Central Sudanic language of DR Congo and Uganda

Mvuba
- Native to: Congo (DRC), Uganda
- Native speakers: (6,000 cited 2000)
- Language family: Nilo-Saharan?: Central Sudanic; Eastern; Mangbutu–Lese; Mvuba

Language codes
- ISO 639-3: mxh
- Glottolog: mvub1239

Mvuba is a Central Sudanic language of northeastern Congo, with a thousand speakers in Uganda. It is similar to Lese.
