= Mangbetu languages =

Mangbetu–Asoa
- Mangbetu
- Geographic distribution: Democratic Republic of Congo
- Linguistic classification: Nilo-Saharan?: Central Sudanic; Eastern; Mangbetu–Asoa
- Subdivisions: Mangbetu; Lombi; Asoa

Language codes
- Glottolog: mang1393

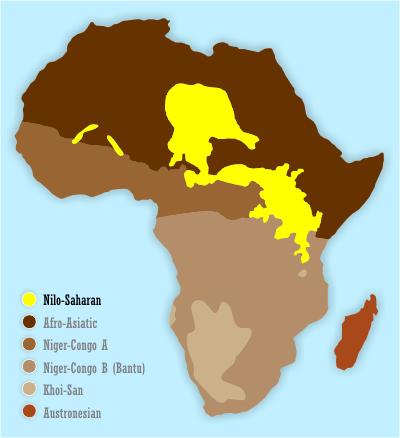
The distribution of Nilo-Saharan languages

The Mangbetu–Asoa or Mangbetu languages of the Central Sudanic language family are a cluster of closely related languages spoken in the Democratic Republic of Congo.

The languages are Mangbetu, spoken by perhaps a million people, and the smaller Lombi and Asoa.

Blench (2000) considers Lombi to be part of the Mangbetu dialect continuum. Asoa is spoken by Pygmies.

Proto-Mangbetu has been reconstructed by Demolin (1992).

== Comparative vocabulary ==
Mangbetu-Asua languages comparative lexicon:

Gloss	Asua	Mangbetu	Nabulu	Lombi	Makere	Malele
bee	ángíyé	nɛ́ngágɪ̀	nɛ́ngágɪ́zè	nɛ́ngágì	nɛ́ngágɪ̀	nɛ́ngágɪ̀
animal	élíè	nérí	nélí	nérí	nérí	nérí
tree	kílílɛ̀yɛ̀	nèkírè	nèkílè	néhò	nèkílè	néhò
mouth	tíkpòè	nètíkpò	nètíkpò	nètí	nɛ̀kɔ́rɔ́	nèkóró
arm	tɛ̂	nɛ́tɛ́	nɛ́tɛ́	nɛ́tɛ́	nɛ́tɛ́	nɛ́tɛ́
goat	àmɛ́mɛ̂	nàmɛ́mɛ́	nàmɛ́mɛ́	nàmyɛ́myɛ́	nàmɛ́mɛ́	nàmɛ́mɛ́
dog	ísìyɛ̀	nésì	nésì	nésì	nésì	nésì
horn	lígá	néígá	néégá	nálígá	náágá	náɛ́gá
to cultivate	ɔ̀ʔà	nɔ̀ʔà	nɔ̀ʔà	nɔ̀ʔà	nɔ̀ʔà	nɔ̀ʔà
water	gwò	ègwò	ègwò	ègwò	ègwò	ègwò
elephant	ʊ̀kɔ̀	nɔ́kɔ̀	nɔ́kɔ̀	nɔ́kɔ̀	nɔ́kɔ̀	nɔ́kɔ̀
iron	kídígwá	néímbá	nèèmbà	èdùmòòmà	náámbá	náɛ́mbá
arrow	líkámʊ́ɛ̀	nɛ̀vàngà	nɛ̀vàngà	nɛ̀mbààngú	nɛ̀vàngà	nɛ̀vàngà

== See also ==
- List of Proto-Mangbetu reconstructions (Wiktionary)
- Central Sudanic word lists (Wiktionary)
