= Mamvu language =

Central Sudanic language of DR Congo

Mamvu
- Native to: Congo (DRC)
- Native speakers: (60,000 cited 1991)
- Language family: Nilo-Saharan?: Central Sudanic; Eastern; Mangbutu–Lese; Mamvu
- Dialects: Mamvu; Amengi

Language codes
- ISO 639-3: mdi
- Glottolog: mamv1243

Mamvu is a Central Sudanic language of northeastern Congo. It is quite similar to Lese.

Mamvu is spoken in Watsa Territory.
