= Mangbetu people =

Ethnic group of the Democratic Republic of the Congo

Mangbetu
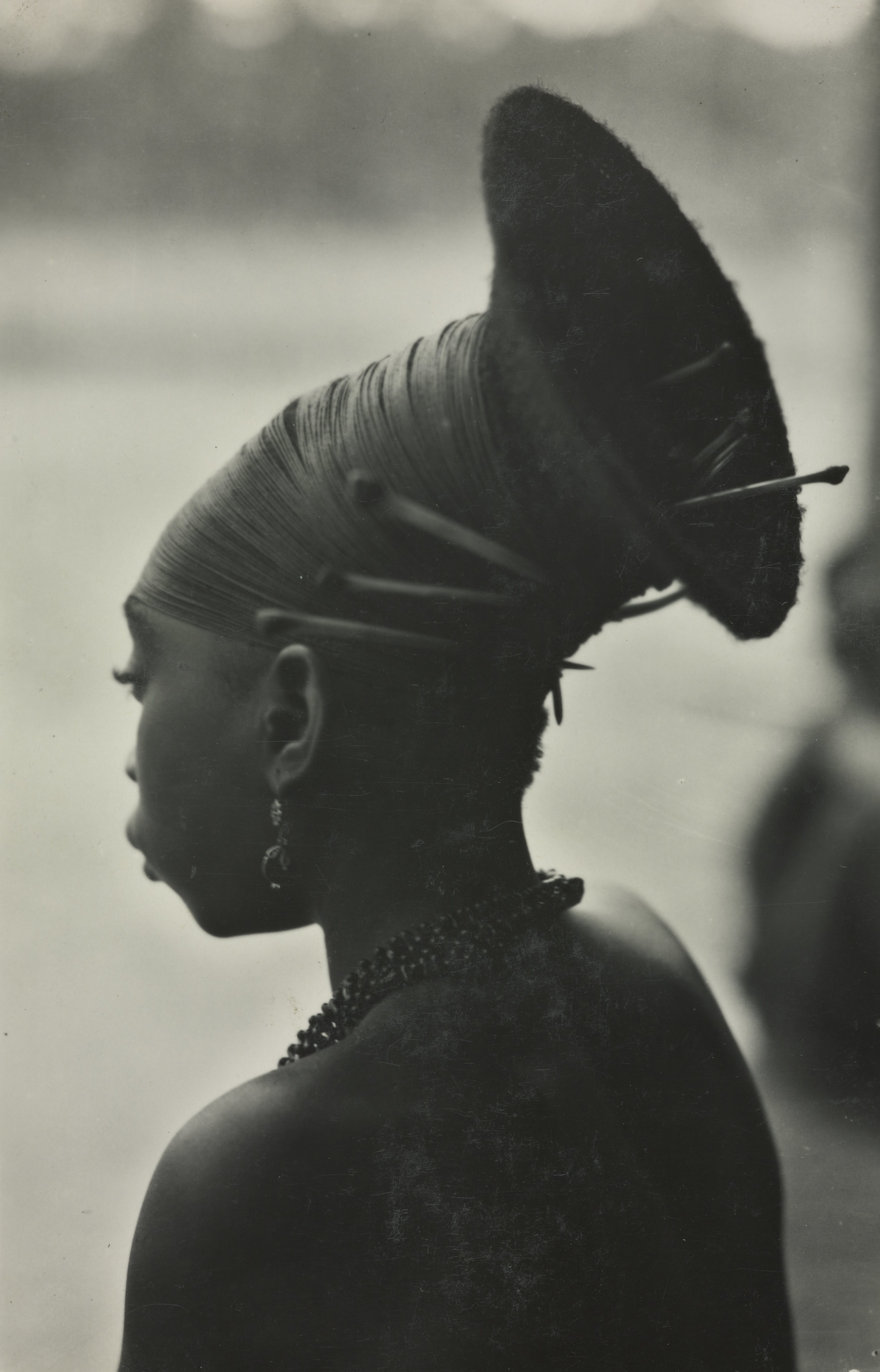
- Mangbetu girl from the 20th century

Total population
- 1,807,000

Regions with significant populations
- Democratic Republic of the Congo: (Haut-Uélé)

Languages
- Native; Mangbetu; Also; Lingala (Bangala dialect) • Swahili • French

Religion
- Traditional African religions • Christianity

Related ethnic groups
- Other Central Sudanic peoples

The Mangbetu are a Central Sudanic ethnic group from the Democratic Republic of the Congo, living in the northeastern province of Haut-Uele.

== Culture ==
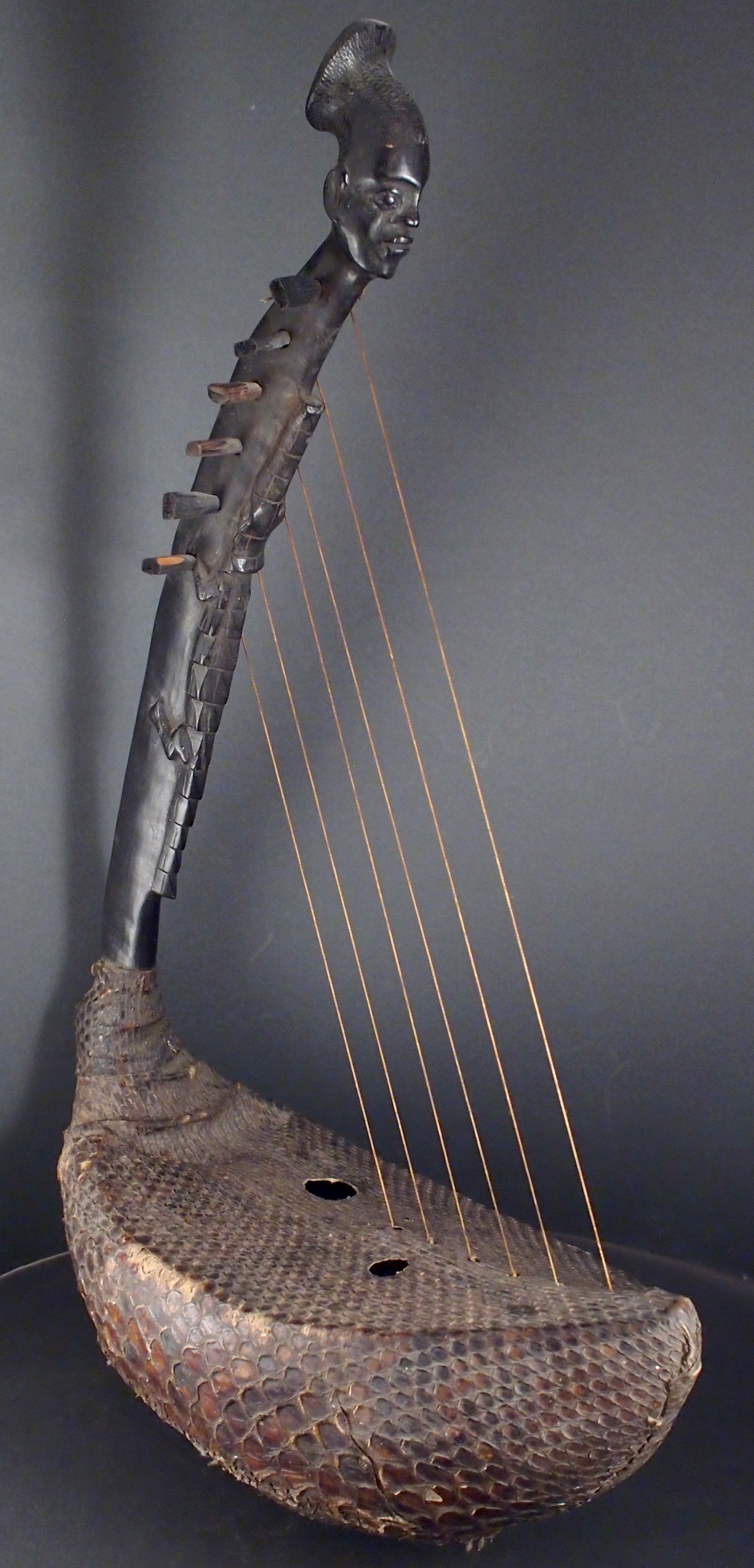
Mangbetu harp. See: African harp.

The Mangbetu are known for their highly developed art and music. One instrument associated with and named after them is the Mangbetu harp or guitar. See the National Music Museum and the Hamill Gallery for images. One harp has sold for over $100,000. Ethnomusicologists have also sought out the Mangbetu to make video and audio recordings of their music.

The Mangbetu stood out to European colonists because of their elongated heads. Traditionally, babies' heads were wrapped tightly with cloth to give them this distinctive appearance. The practice, called Lipombo, began dying out in the 1950s with the influence of westernization. Because of this distinctive look, it is easy to recognize Mangbetu figures in African art.

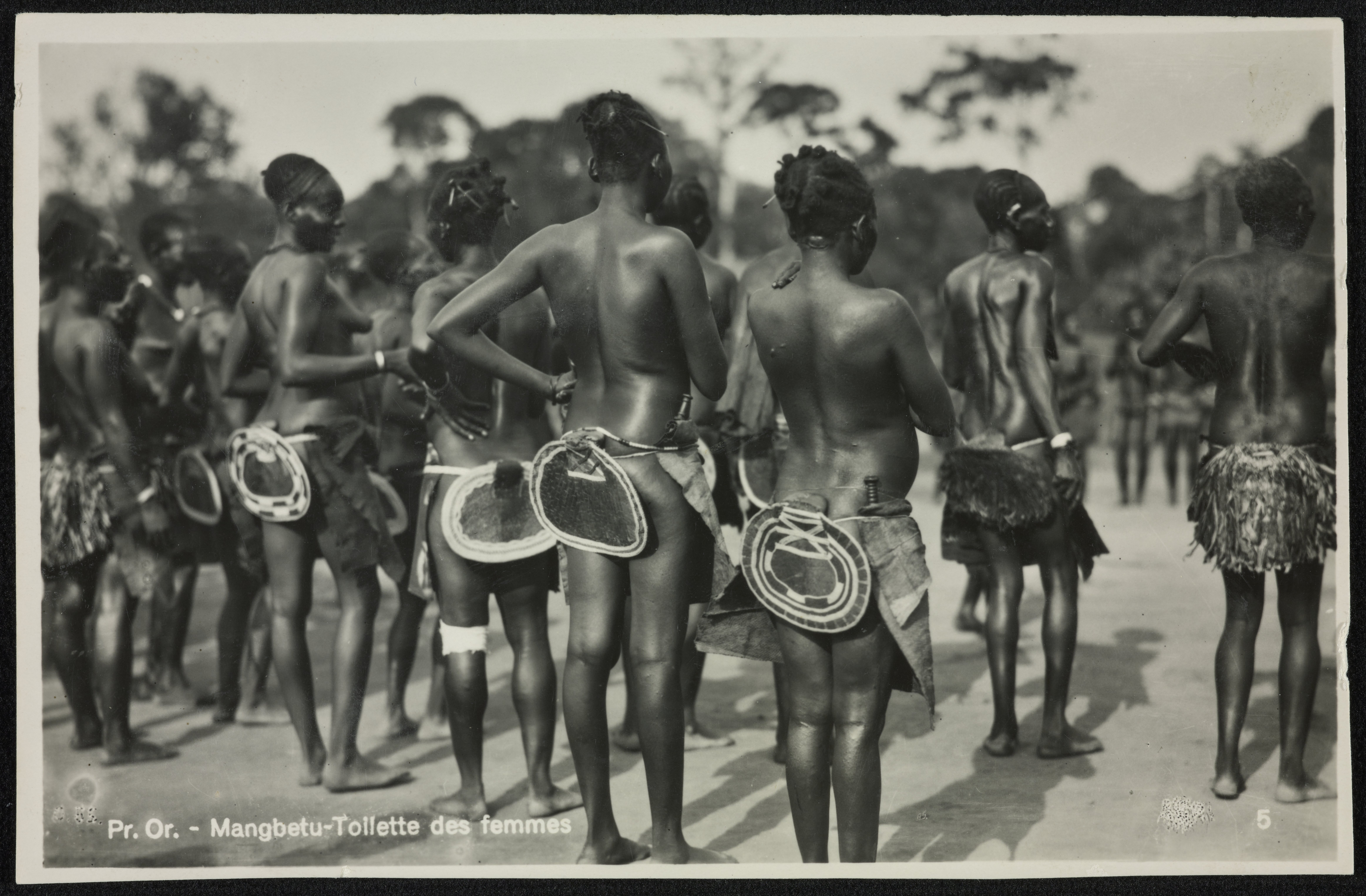
Mangbetu dancers, photo by Casimir Zagourski

== History ==
The Mangbetu originally came from southern Sudan and migrated south to their current location in CE 1000. When they arrived into their current location with its new climate and environment (which was different from the much drier lands in southern Sudan) they came to be so heavily influenced by Bantu speakers that they borrowed almost their whole vocabulary relating to their new habitat from Bantu languages.

By the early 18th century the Mangbetu had consisted of a number of small clans who, from southward migrations, had come in contact with a number of northward-migrating Bantu-speaking tribes among whom they lived interspersed. In the late 18th century a group of Mangbetu-speaking elites, mainly from the Mabiti clan, assumed control over other Mangbetu clans and unified them into a kingdom. It is likely that their knowledge of iron and copper forging, by which they made weapons and fine ornaments, gave them a military and economic advantage over their neighbors.

After the unification of Mangbetu clans, King Nabiembali began expanding Mangbetu influence in the early 19th century into other tribes, namely the Madi, Bangba, Mayogo, Mayvu, Makango, and Barambo. Nabiembali legitimized his conquests by marrying many local wives of these peoples, allowing his sons to be accepted as rulers among their mothers' peoples. However, because his sons sought to extend their own power and influence of their maternal clans they ruled, they became resistant to Nabiembali, and in 1859, they revolted and killed him, establishing their own independent kingdoms. These kingdoms would be subject as part of Sudan to Egyptian rule in the late 19th century, regaining independence briefly after the Mahdist takeover of Sudan until their integration in 1892 into the Congo Free State.

"King Munza dances before his wives" by George Schweinfurth in 1874.

In 1870, German botanist Georg Schweinfurth encountered the Mangbetu. In his travel account, he described them as "aristocratic" and "elegant". In the first half of the 20th century, Western photographers and filmmakers such as Casimir Zagourski documented Mangbetu culture. These images include Mangbetu royal courts, architecture and dances, their tradition of elongating children's heads and women's elaborate hair styles.

== See also ==
- Mangbetu Pottery
- African art
