= Mayogo people =

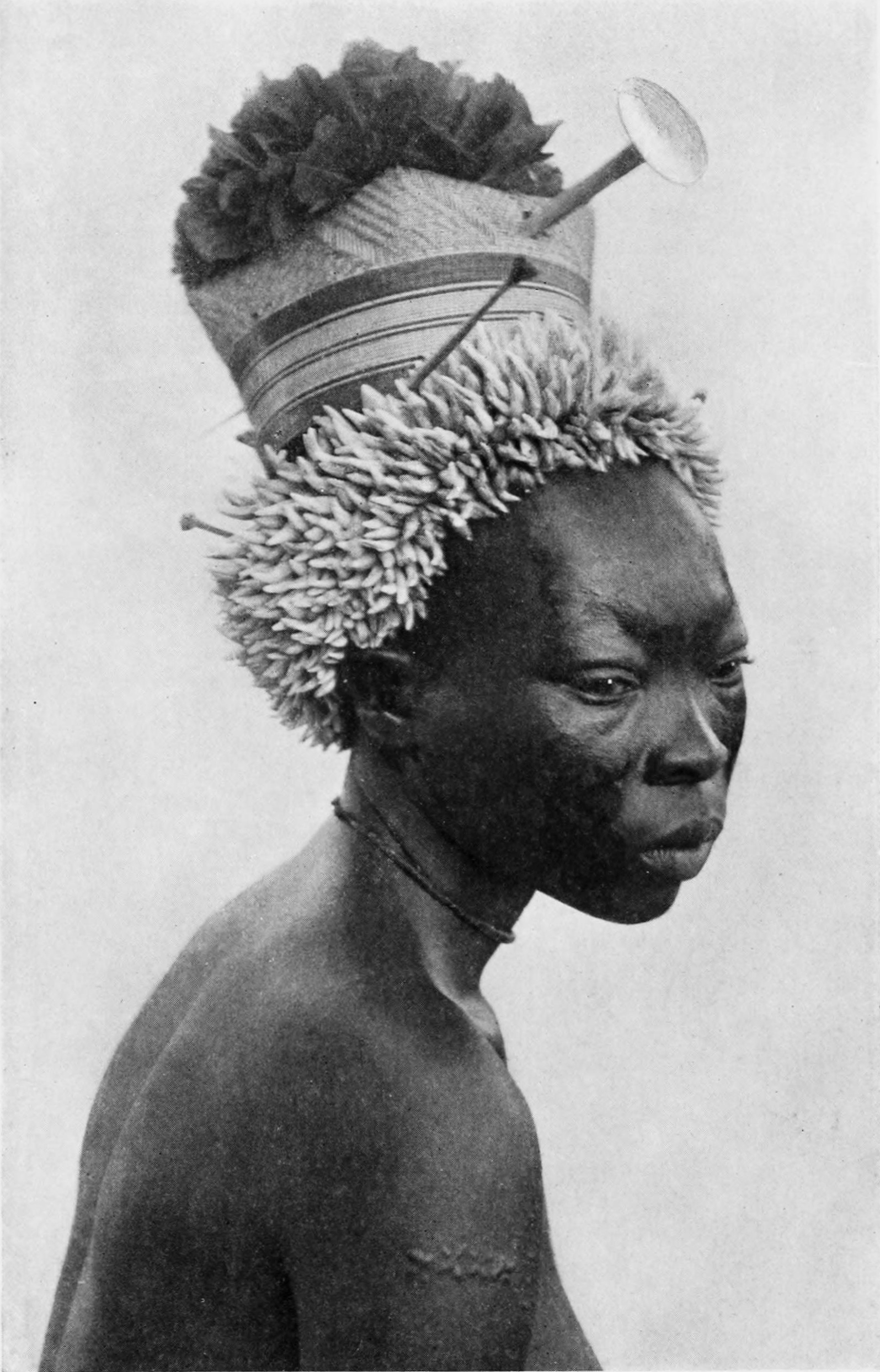
Wife of a Mayogo chief, early 1900s.

The Mayogo people are an ethnic group of Central Africa, concentrated predominantly in northeastern Democratic Republic of the Congo. They speak Mayogo, an Ubangian language.
