= Mangbetu language =

Nilo-Saharan language spoken in DR Congo

Mangbetu
- Nemangbetu
- Region: Congo (DRC)
- Ethnicity: Mangbetu people
- Native speakers: (650,000 Mangbetu proper cited 1985); Lombi: 12,000 (1993)
- Language family: Nilo-Saharan?: Central Sudanic; Eastern; Mangbetu–Asoa; Mangbetu

Language codes
- ISO 639-3: Either: mdj – Mangbetu lmi – Lombi
- Glottolog: mang1394 Mangbetu lomb1254 Lombi

Mangbetu, or Nemangbetu, is one of the most populous of the Central Sudanic languages. It is spoken by the Mangbetu people of northeastern Congo. It, or its speakers, are also known as Amangbetu, Kingbetu, Mambetto. The most populous dialect, and the one most widely understood, is called Medje. Others are Aberu (Nabulu), Makere, Malele, Popoi (Mapopoi). The most divergent is Lombi; Ethnologue treats it as a distinct language. About half of the population speaks Bangala, a trade language similar to Lingala, and in southern areas some speak Swahili.

The Mangbetu live in association with the Asua, and their languages are closely related.

== Dialects ==
Mangbetu dialects and locations as listed by Demolin (1992):

- Mangbetu proper is spoken north of Isiro, in the subregion of Haut-Uele and north of the Bomokandi River. It is found in Nangazizi and Rungu in the collectivité of Azanga, Ganga in the collectivité of Okondo, Tapili in the collectivité of Mangbetu, Medanoma in the collectivité of Mangbele, in Ndei collectivité north of Isiro, and in Mboli collectivité near Goa.
- Medje (Mɛdʒɛ) is spoken south of Isiro, around Medje in Mongomassi and Medje collectivités, and also in the ethnic Mangbetu collectivités of Azanga and Ndei.
- Makere is spoken around Zobia in the subregion of Bas-Uele.
- Malele is spoken in Poko Territory - in the areas of Balele, Niapu, and Kisanga.
- Mapopoi is spoken in Panga and the Aruwimi River.
- Nabulu is spoken in Bafwasamoa, 15 km north of Nia-Nia.
- Lombi is spoken in Bafwasende Territory - in Barumbi around the Opienge River, and in Maiko National Park.

== Phonology ==
=== Vowels ===
The following are the monophthong and diphthong phonemes of Mangbetu:

	Front		Back	
	+ATR	-ATR	+ATR	-ATR
Close	i	ɪ	u	ʊ
Mid	e	ɛ	o	ɔ
Open	a			

		Front		Back	
		+ATR	-ATR	+ATR	-ATR
Mid	front	ei̯	ɛɪ̯	oi̯	ɔɪ̯
Mid	back			ou̯	ɔʊ̯
Open		ai̯		au̯	

- /a ɛ ɔ o/ have a length contrast.

The description of the vowels of Mangbetu as constituting a system of tongue root harmony is conventional and should not be taken as a precise description of the phonetic character of the vowel system. The two sets of vowels are differentiated by the vertical movement of the larynx, among other articulatory factors. The system has also been described more loosely as having an opposition of tense (tendues) and lax (relâchées) vowels. Vowels in affixes assimilate to the "tongue root" quality of the vowels found in the root or stem of the word in question, with /a ε ɪ ɔ ʊ/ resulting in -ATR and /e i o u/ in +ATR vowels. However, /a/ can also be considered as an opaque element, because it can stop the vowel harmony from spreading such as in nɛ́ɛ́kábú ‘sadness’.

=== Consonants ===
		Bilabial	Labio- dental	Alveolar	Retroflex	Palatal (-alveolar)	Velar	Labial- velar	Glottal
Nasal		m		n		ɲ	ŋ		
Plosive/ Affricate	voiceless	p		t	ʈʳ	t͡ʃ	k	k͡p	ʔ
Plosive/ Affricate	voiced	b		d	ɖʳ	d͡ʒ	ɡ	ɡ͡b	
Plosive/ Affricate	prenasal	ᵐb		ⁿd	ᶯɖʳ		ᵑɡ	ᵑᵐɡ͡b	
Implosive		ɓ		ɗ		ʄ			
Trill/ Fricative	voiceless	ʙ̥	f	s					h
Trill/ Fricative	voiced	ʙ	v	z					
Trill/ Fricative	prenasal	ᵐʙ	ᶬv	ⁿz					
Tap			ⱱ						
Approximant				l		j		w	

- The retroflexes are slightly post-trilled [ʈʳ ɖʳ ᶯɖʳ].

One unusual feature of Mangbetu is that it has both a voiced and a voiceless bilabial trill as well as a labial flap.

[nóʙ̥ù] 'to bring out'
[nóʙù] 'to fan'
[nóᵐʙù] 'to enclose'
[nóⱱò] 'to defecate'
[nóʙò] 'to get fat'

The labial trills are not particularly associated with back vowels or prenasalization, pace their development in some American languages.

[éʙ̥ì] 'leaping like a leopard'
[nɛʙàʙá] 'kind of plan'

According to McKee (2007a), "Judging from what Maddieson (1989) says concerning others of the world's languages with such [i.e., bilabial] trills, Meegye and Mangbetu are probably among the leaders in terms of both the number of lexical items with trills and the form classes they represent." Also, by McKee's analysis, the trills do not pattern "as simple/unit trill phonemes, but rather as complex stop phonemes with a labial release consonantal in character" - i.e. they are phonemically /pʷ bʷ ᵐbʷ/.

The case for the trills patterning as they do is presented in McKee (1991a). This is a Nilo-Saharan conference paper that treats how best to interpret the many labialized and palatalized consonants in Meegye verb and noun stems as well as members of other form classes. This is the same phonological case/argument behind McKee's preference, from ca. 2000, for writing 'Meegye' rather than, e.g., the Belgian colonial administration's 'Medje'.

=== Tone ===
There is a distinction between high and low tones in Mangbetu, with multiple minimal pairs distinguished only by tone: náŋwɛ́ 'kola nut'-naŋwɛ́ 'moon'; nɛ́ɓà 'village'-nɛ́ɓá 'kind of tree'. Rising and falling tones might also be phonemic.

=== Phonotactics ===
Mangbetu syllables are always open, with the shortest syllables consisting of just a vowel, and the longest consisting of a consonant, followed by a glide, followed by a vowel, or CGV.

== Morphology ==
Mangbetu words are constructed through the use of various affixes attached to a lexical root. These roots typically consist of a consonant-vowel combination preceded by a ‘characteristic vowel.’. For example, the word ná-mutali, ‘fish,’ can be broken down into the segments ná-mu-t-a-li, containing the root -li, the characteristic vowel -a-, prefixes -t- and -mu-, and the singular marker ná-.

Tonal variation plays a significant role in the language’s morphology, particularly in differentiating singular and plural nouns. For example, in two-syllable words, these changes may involve tone inversion, as in nɛgɔ́ (‘bed’) and ɛ́gɔ (‘beds’), or modification of the second tone, as in nári (‘bird’) and árí (‘birds’), though it is also possible for the plural form of a word to have the same tonal pattern as the singular, as in néri ('animal') and éri ('animals').

=== Verbal Inflection ===
==== Tense and Aspect ====
Larochette notes that Mangbetu differentiates between three levels of temporal proximity in its Past and Future tenses: recent, moderately recent, and remote. He also writes of a Present-Intensive tense, which marks the intensity of a present action.

McKee (1991b) is a Nilo-Saharan conference paper on Meegye tense and aspect. It treats: phrase-level continuous action in two structurally-similar verb phrase types; four word-level aspects (viz., unmarked, perfect, habitual, and completive); and something of how these word-level aspects intersect with Meegye's tense system. McKee (2023), in one of its human-interest vignettes, includes reference to one of the verb phrase types with continuous-action meaning (that which involves Meegye's general-locative words glossed 'here', 'there', and 'yonder') as well as to Meegye's "beautifully symmetrical" tense-aspect (sub-)system that has an unmarked, perfect, habitual, and completive form for each of Meegye's three past tenses.

== Discourse ==
=== Narrative development marking ===
McKee (2007b) is a Nilo-Saharan conference paper that analyzes the Meegye connective bhe “as what Dooley and Levinsohn (2001) have called a discourse developmental marker.” Part of the abstract reads, “In the paper’s longest section, an examination of where bhe is and is not deployed in a number of oral tale texts leads to the conclusion that bhe fits reasonably well Dooley and Levinsohn’s (2001] cross-linguistic characterization of developmental markers.”

== Bibliography ==
- Demolin, Didier (1991). "L'analyse des segments, de la syllabe et des tons dans un jeu de langage mangbetu". Langages. 25 (101). Paris: Armand Colin: 30–50. doi:10.3406/lgge.1991.1800.
- Demolin, Didier (1992). Le Mangbetu: étude phonétique et phonologique (PhD dissertation). Vol. 2 vols. Brussels: Faculté de Philosophie et Lettres, Université libre de Bruxelles.
- Bokula, Moiso; Irumu, Agozia Kario (1994). "Bibliographie et matériaux lexicaux des langues Moru-Mangbetu (Soudan-Central, Zaïre)". Annales Aequatoria. 15: 203–245. ISSN 0254-4296.
- Larochette, J. (1958). Grammaire des dialectes mangbetu et medje, suivie d'un manuel de conversation et d'un lexique. Annales du Musée royal du Congo belge, Série in-8, Sciences de l'homme, 18. Tervuren: Musée royal de l'Afrique centrale.
- "Linguist Wins Symbolic Victory for 'Labiodental Flap'". 2005-12-17.
- "LINGUIST List 8.45: Bilabial trill". 1997.
- McKee, Robert G. (2007a). "Concerning Meegye and Mangbetu's bilabial trills". In Payne, Doris L.; Reh, Mechthild (eds.). Advances in Nilo-Saharan Linguistics: Proceedings of the 8th Nilo-Saharan Linguistics Colloquium, University of Hamburg, August 22–25, 2001. Cologne: Rüdiger Köppe Verlag. pp. 181–190.
- Olson, Kenneth S.; Koogibho, David Mbiri (2013). "Labial vibrants in Mangbetu". Afrikanistik online. 2013. doi:10.18716/ojs/aaeo/2013_3396. ISSN 1860-7462.
- Maddieson, Ian (1989). "Aerodynamic constraints on sound change: The case of bilabial trills". UCLA Working Papers in Phonetics. 72: 91–115. ISSN 0575-4836.
- McKee, Robert G. (1991a). "The interpretation of consonants with semi-vowel release in Meje (Zaire) stems". In Rottland, Franz; Omondi, Lucia N. (eds.). Proceedings of the Third Nilo-Saharan Linguistics Colloquium, Kisumu, Kenya, August 4–9, 1986. Hamburg: Helmut Buske Verlag. pp. 181–195.
- McKee, Robert G. (1991b). "'Here', 'there', 'yonder', and beyond with Meje aspect". In Rottland, Franz; Omondi, Lucia N. (eds.). Proceedings of the Third Nilo-Saharan Linguistics Colloquium, Kisumu, Kenya, August 4–9, 1986. Hamburg: Helmut Buske Verlag. pp. 165–180.
- McKee, Robert G. (2007b). "The Meegye connective BHE as a discourse developmental marker" (PDF). GIALens. 1 (2).
- McKee, Robert G. (2023-09-20). “Let’s Understand Each Other!”: Meegye-Mangbetu Death Compensations in the Forest of Alliances. Leanpub: Leanpub. ISBN 979-8-9862495-3-7.
- Dooley, R. A.; Levinsohn, S. H. (2001). Analyzing Discourse: A Manual of Basic Concepts. Dallas, TX: SIL International. ISBN 1-55671-115-8.
- Eberhard, David M.; Simons, Gary F.; Fennig, Charles D. (2022). "Lombi". Ethnologue: Languages of the World (25th ed.). Dallas, Texas: SIL International. ISBN 978-1-55671-502-0.
