= Twa =

Group of Central African peoples

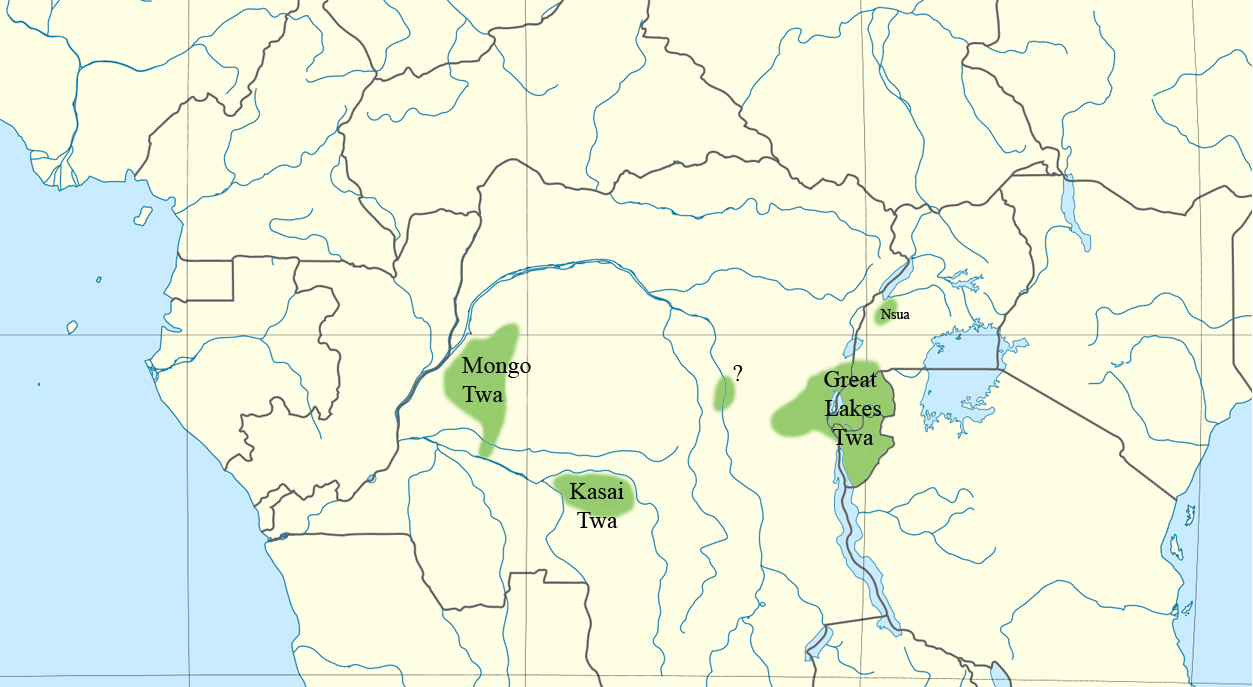
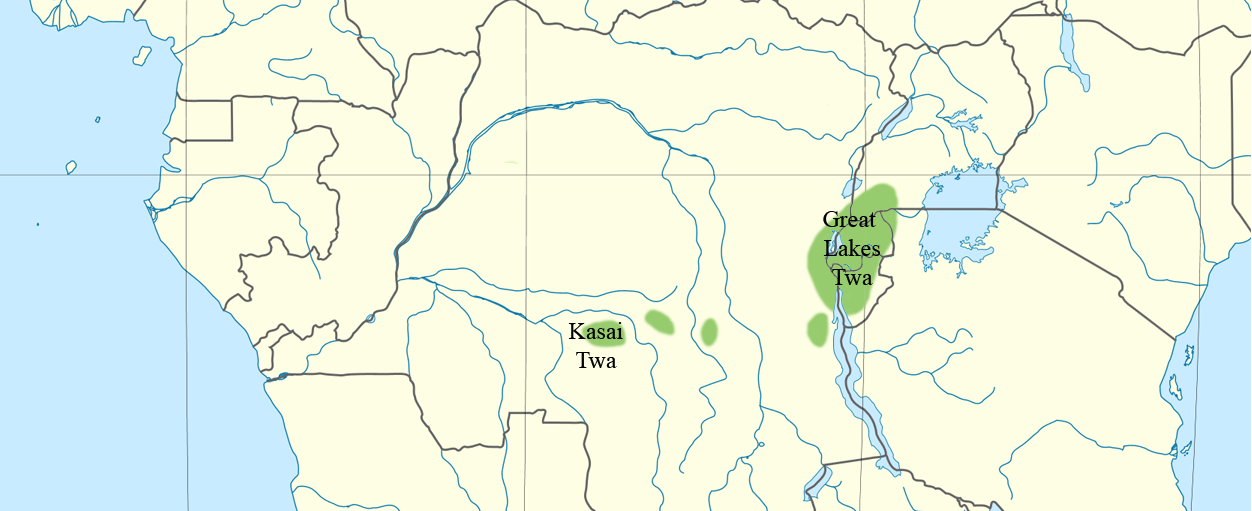
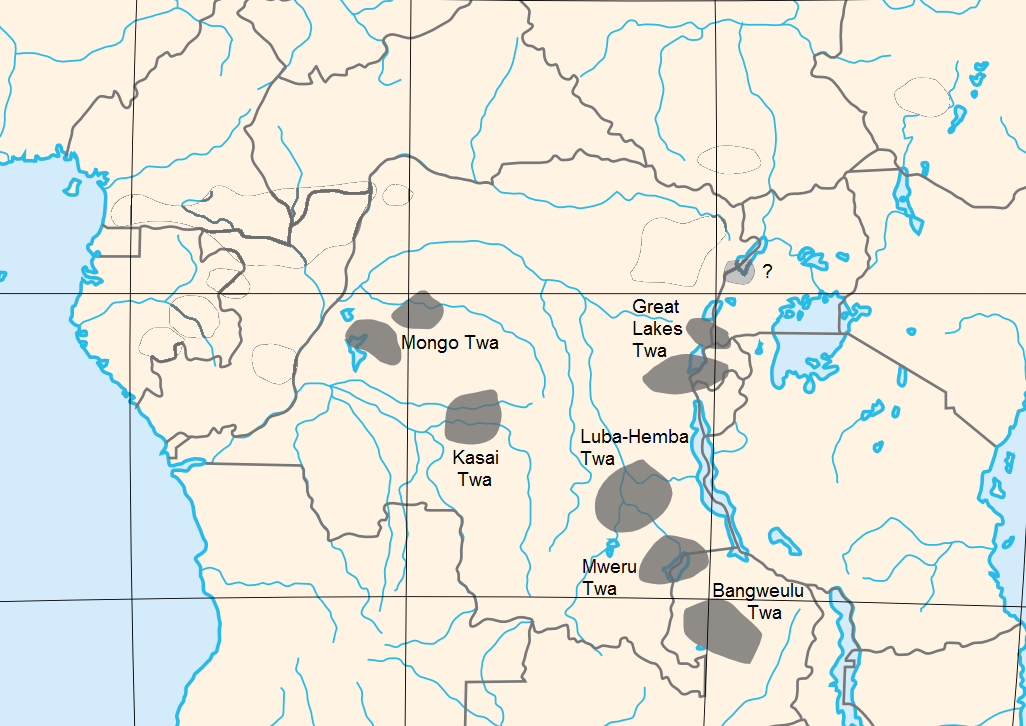
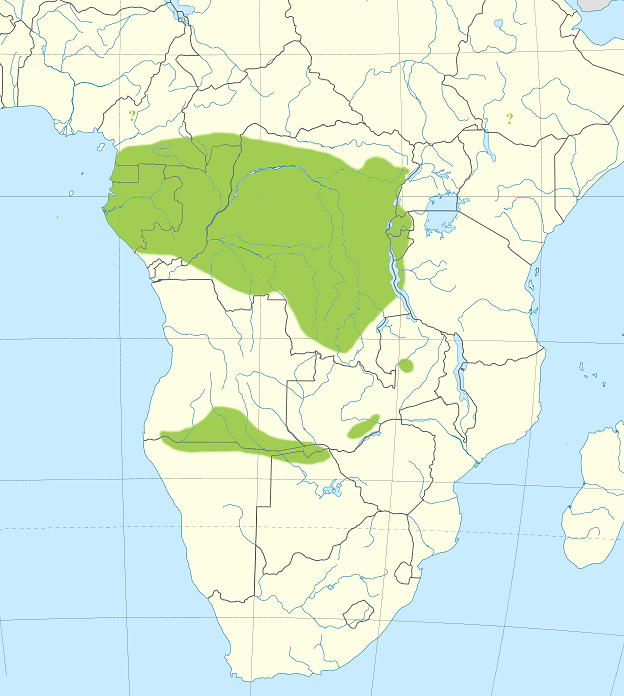
- Twa populations according to Hewlett & Fancher. From west to east: Ntomba, Kasai, [unidentified], Great Lakes, Nsua [not clear if Nsua is Twa]. Twa populations according to Stokes. Only a few groups are shown, but these include several between the Kasai and Great Lakes Twa. Twa/pygmoid populations according to Cavalli-Sforza. Several southern groups are added. Twa populations scattered through shaded area, according to Blench. Several southern Twa areas are shown.

Languages
- Bantu languages, French

Religion
- Traditional African religions, Christianity

Twa
- Person: Mutwa
- People: Batwa
- Language: Kitwa
- Country: Butwa

The Twa, often referred to as Batwa or Mutwa (singular), Barhwa or Murhwa (singular), are indigenous hunter-gatherer peoples of the Great Lakes Region in Central Africa, recognized as some of the earliest inhabitants of the area. Historically and academically, the term "Pygmy" has been used to describe these groups; however, it is considered derogatory, particularly by the Twa themselves. While some Batwa activists accept the term as an acknowledgement of their indigenous status, most prefer specific ethnic labels such as Bambuti (for the Ituri Forest region in the Democratic Republic of the Congo), Baaka (Lobaye Forest, Central African Republic), and Bambendjelle (Ndoki Forest, Congo-Brazzaville and Central African Republic).

== Relation to the Bantu populations ==
All Twa populations live near or in agricultural villages. Agricultural Bantu peoples have settled a number of ecotones next to an area that has game but will not support agriculture, such as the edges of the rainforest, open swamp, and desert. The Twa spend part of the year in the otherwise uninhabited region hunting game, trading for agricultural products with the farmers while they do so.

Roger Blench has proposed that the Twa originated as a caste like they are today, much like the Numu blacksmith castes of West Africa, economically specialized groups which became endogamous and consequently developed into separate ethnic groups, sometimes, as with the Ligbi, also their own languages. A mismatch in language between patron and client could later occur from population displacements. The short stature of the "forest people" could have developed in the millennia since the Bantu expansion, as happened also with Bantu domestic animals in the rainforest. Perhaps there was additional selective pressure from farmers taking the tallest women back to their villages as wives. However, that is incidental to the social identity of the Twa.

== Congo ==
Twa live scattered throughout the Congo. In addition to the Great Lakes Twa of the dense forests under the Ruwenzoris, there are notable populations in the swamp forest around Lake Tumba in the west (about 14,000 Twa, more than the Great Lakes Twa in all countries), in the forest–savanna swamps of Kasai in the south-center, and in the savanna swamps scattered throughout Katanga in the south-east, as in the Upemba Depression with its floating islands, and around Kiambi on the Luvua River.

The island of Idjwi has a native population of approximately 7,000 Batwa. According to UNHRW more than 10,000 BaTwa are displaced from Virunga Park in the Northern Kivu province's refugee camps such as Mugunga and Mubambiro due to decades of war.

The term Batwa is used to cover a number of different cultural groups, while many Batwa in various parts of the DRC call themselves Bambuti.

Arab and colonial accounts speak of Twa on either side of the Lomami River southwest of Kisangani, and on the Tshuapa River and its tributary the "Bussera".

Among the Mongo, on the rare occasions of caste mixing, the child is raised as Twa. If this is a common pattern with Twa groups, it may explain why the Twa are less physically distinct from their patrons than the Mbenga and Mbuti, where village men take Pygmy women out of the forest as wives. The Congolese variant of the name, at least in Mongo, Kasai, and Katanga, is Cwa. (Note: A local variant of Twa in Congo. Pronounced approximately /ˈtʃwɑː/.)

== Uganda ==
The Batwa of Uganda were forest dwellers who lived by gathering and hunting as their main source of food.

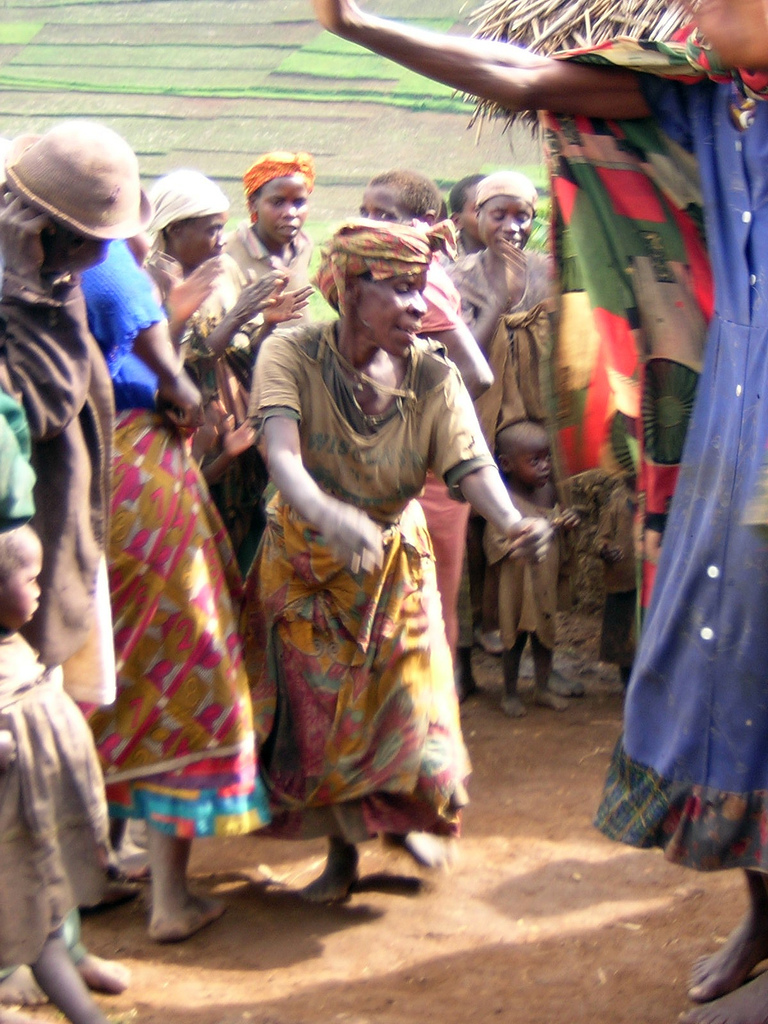
Dancing Batwa in Uganda

They are believed to have lived in the Bwindi Impenetrable and Mgahinga National parks that border the Democratic Republic of the Congo (DRC) and Rwanda living mainly in areas bordering other Bantu Tribes.

In 1992 the Bwindi Impenetrable Forest became a national park and a World Heritage Site to protect the 350 endangered mountain gorillas within its boundaries. As a result, the Batwa were evicted from the park. Since they had no title to the land, they were given no compensation. The Batwa became conservation refugees in an unforested environment unfamiliar to them. Poverty, drugs and alcohol abuse were rampant, as well as a lack of education facilities, HIV as well as violence and discrimination against women and girls were higher among Batwa communities than among the neighboring Bantu communities.

== Rwanda ==
The Twa People of Rwanda are connected to a broader population of Twa peoples, and one of three main ethnic groups, alongside the Hutu and the Tutsi.

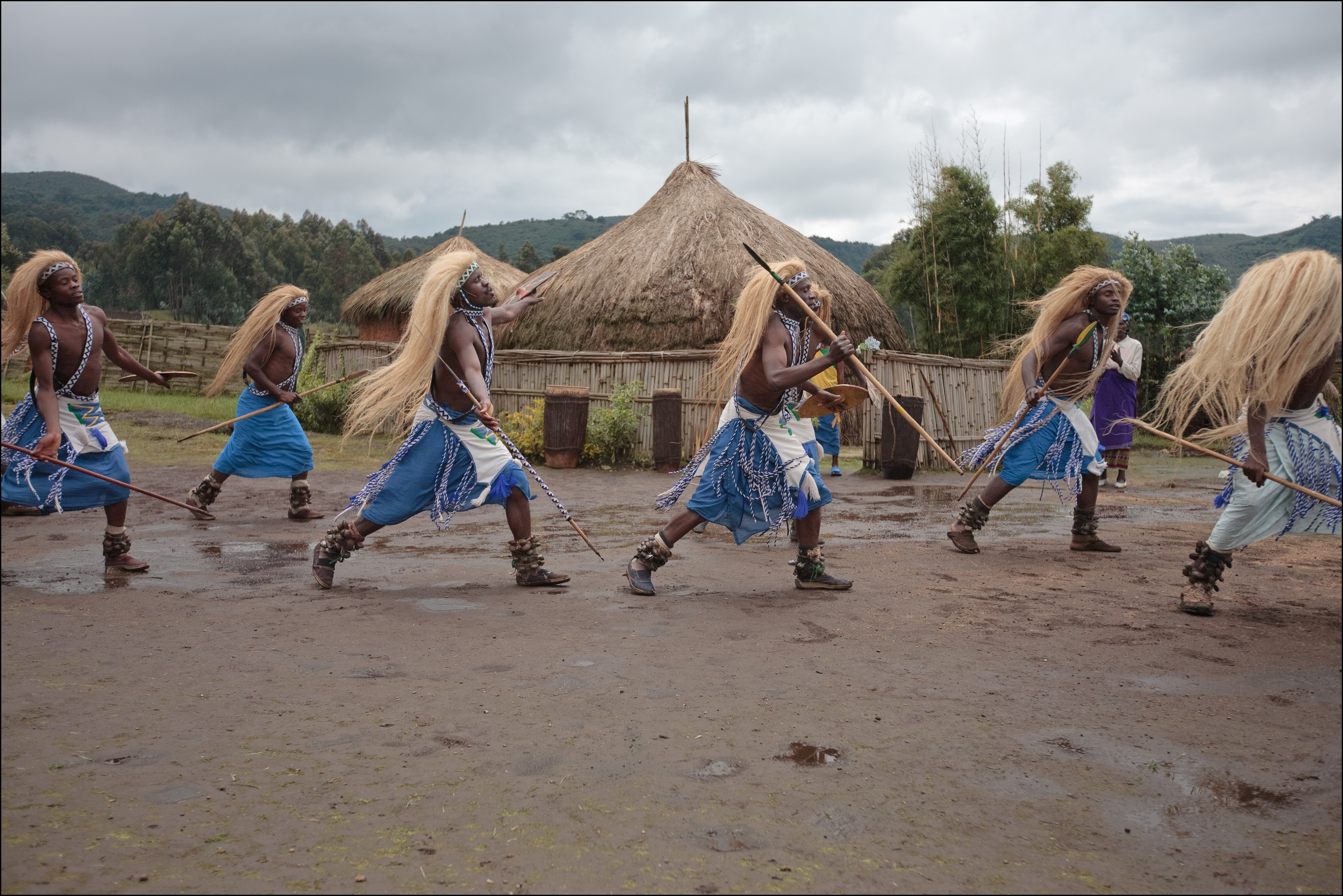
Twa dancers performing in Rwanda

They comprise around 0.2–0.7% of the population, with estimates ranging from 20,000 to 36,000 individuals according to various sources. The Twa in Rwanda have been designated as a "Historically Marginalized People" (HMP).

The Twa today make up less than one percent of Rwanda’s population. Historically, however, they held a greater presence in the region. Oral history and anthropological evidence substantiate their Indigenous status, showing no signs of a prior migration. The arrival of the Hutu and the Tutsi (as they are ethnically acknowledged today) around 1100 AD marked the onset of Twa subjugation, a practice that was sustained during precolonial and colonial periods and into the era of post-colonial conflict

As largely hunter gatherer populations, the Twa were experts of the woodland landscape, well versed in acquiring both plant and animal food sources for hundreds of years before herders and farmers began to clear large sections of forests—decimating arable land for agriculture and livestock. This decimation led to a significant decrease in livelihood for the Twa, who sustained themselves by providing forest resources and goods to other populations–as these populations no longer relied on the Twa for access and woodland territories decreased, the dependence on agricultural and pastoral resources increased, and a number of Twa struggled to maintain their way of life.

During the Rwandan Genocide, it is estimated that about 10,000 Twa, around one third of the Twa population, were killed. While the genocide was principally organized against the Tutsi people, and also targeted moderate Hutu opponents, the Twa were swept into the violence, as having been perceived by Hutu extremists as sympathetic to Tutsis.

== Malawi ==
In Malawi, the Twa are commonly referred to as the Akafula, Abathwa, Akaombe, or Mwandionerakuti, and are recognized as hunter-gatherers who occupied the land before the Bantu expansion gradually displaced them starting in the 11th century. Recorded oral traditions place the populations as having inhabited from the northern end of the region to the southern end of Lake Nyasa before the sixteenth century. The UNESCO World Heritage Site Chongoni Rock-Art Area in Dedza District, features red schematic paintings attributed to the Akafula.

== Angola and Namibia ==
Southern Angola through central Namibia had Twa populations when Europeans first arrived in the 16th century. Estermann writes,

The southern Twa today live in close economic symbiosis with the tribes among which they are scattered—Ngambwe, Havakona, Zimba and Himba. None of the individuals I have observed differs physically from the neighboring Bantu.

These peoples live in desert environments. Accounts are limited and tend to confuse the Twa with the San.

== Zambia and Botswana ==
The Twa of these countries live in swampy areas, such as the Twa fishermen of the Bangweulu Swamps, Lukanga Swamp, and Kafue Flats of Zambia; only the Twa fish in Southern Province, where the swampy terrain means that large-scale crops cannot be planted near the best fishing grounds.

The geneticist Cavalli-Sforza also shows Twa near Lake Mweru on the Zambia–Congo border. There are two obvious possibilities: the Luapula Swamps, and the swamps of Lake Mweru Wantipa. The latter is Taabwa territory, and the Twa are reported to live among the Taabwa. The former is reported to be the territory of Bemba-speaking Twa.

== See also ==
- Pygmies
- Classification of Pygmy languages
