= Lese language =

Central Sudanic language of DR Congo

Lese
- Efé
- Native to: Democratic Republic of the Congo
- Region: Ituri forest
- Ethnicity: Lese, Efe people
- Native speakers: (70,000 cited 1991)
- Language family: Nilo-Saharan?: Central Sudanic; Eastern; Mangbutu–Lese; Lese

Language codes
- ISO 639-3: Either: les – Lese efe – Efe
- Glottolog: lese1243 Lese efee1239 Efe

Lese is a Central Sudanic language of northeastern Democratic Republic of the Congo, as well as a name for the people who speak this language. The Lese people live in association with the Efé Pygmies and share their language, which is occasionally known as Lissi or Efe.

Although Efe is given a separate ISO code, Bahuchet (2006) notes that it is not even a distinct dialect, though there is dialectical variation in the language of the Lese (Dese, Karo).

Lese is spoken in Mambasa Territory, Watsa Territory, and Irumu Territory.

== Phonology ==
=== Vowels ===
	Front	Central	Back
Close	i		u
Near-close	ɪ		ʊ
Close-mid	e		o
Open-mid	ɛ		ɔ
Open		a	

- In rare cases, /ɛ/ can be heard in phonological opposition as a rounded [œ].

=== Consonants ===
		Bilabial	Labio- dental	Alveolar	Retroflex	Palatal (-alveolar)	Velar	Labial– velar	Labial- uvular	Glottal
Plosive/ Affricate	voiceless	p	p͡f	t	ʈ	t͡ʃ	k	k͡p	q͡ɓ	ʔ
Plosive/ Affricate	voiced	b	b͡v	d		d͡ʒ	ɡ	ɡ͡b	q͡ɓ	
Implosive		ɓ		ɗ				ɠ͡ɓ	q͡ɓ	
Fricative	voiceless		f	s						h
Fricative	voiced		v							
Nasal		m		n						
Approximant				l		j		w		
Trill				r						

- [q͡p] is an allophone of /q͡ɓ/. In Demolin (1999), the meaning of /q͡ɓ/ is unclear, but /q͡ɓ/ seems to be a voiceless labial–uvular stop with significant lowering and a strong release. More research is needed to determine the true nature of this sound.
- In the Efe dialect, /kp/ has the allophone [kʙ̥].
- /r/ can also be heard as a tap [ɾ].

== Bibliography ==
- Bahuchet, Serge (2006). "Languages of the African Rainforest 'Pygmy' Hunter-Gatherers: Language Shifts without Cultural Admixture". Historical linguistics and hunter-gatherers populations in global perspective (PDF). Leipzig. HAL hal-00548207.
- Bokula, Moiso; Irumu, Agozia-Kario (1994). "Bibliographie et matériaux lexicaux des langues Moru-Mangbetu (Soudan-Central, Zaïre)". Annales Aequatoria. 10: 203‒245.
- Demolin, Didier; Teston, Bernard (September 1997). "Phonetic characteristics of double articulations in some Mangbutu-Efe languages" (PDF). International Speech Communication Association: 803–806.
- Güldemann, Tom (2018-09-10). Güldemann, Tom (ed.). The Languages and Linguistics of Africa. The World of Linguistics. Vol. 11. Walter de Gruyter. doi:10.1515/9783110421668. ISBN 978-3-11-042175-0. S2CID 158969184.
- Smith, Edwin W. (1938). A Tentative Grammar of the Efe or Mbuti language. Methodist Missionary Society in Africa & Bible Society.
- Vorbichler, Anton (1965). Die Phonologie und Morphologie des Balese (Ituri-Urwald, Kongo). Glückstadt: J. J. Augustin. OCLC 4813740.
