= Abir Haj Ibrahim =

Syrian peace activist

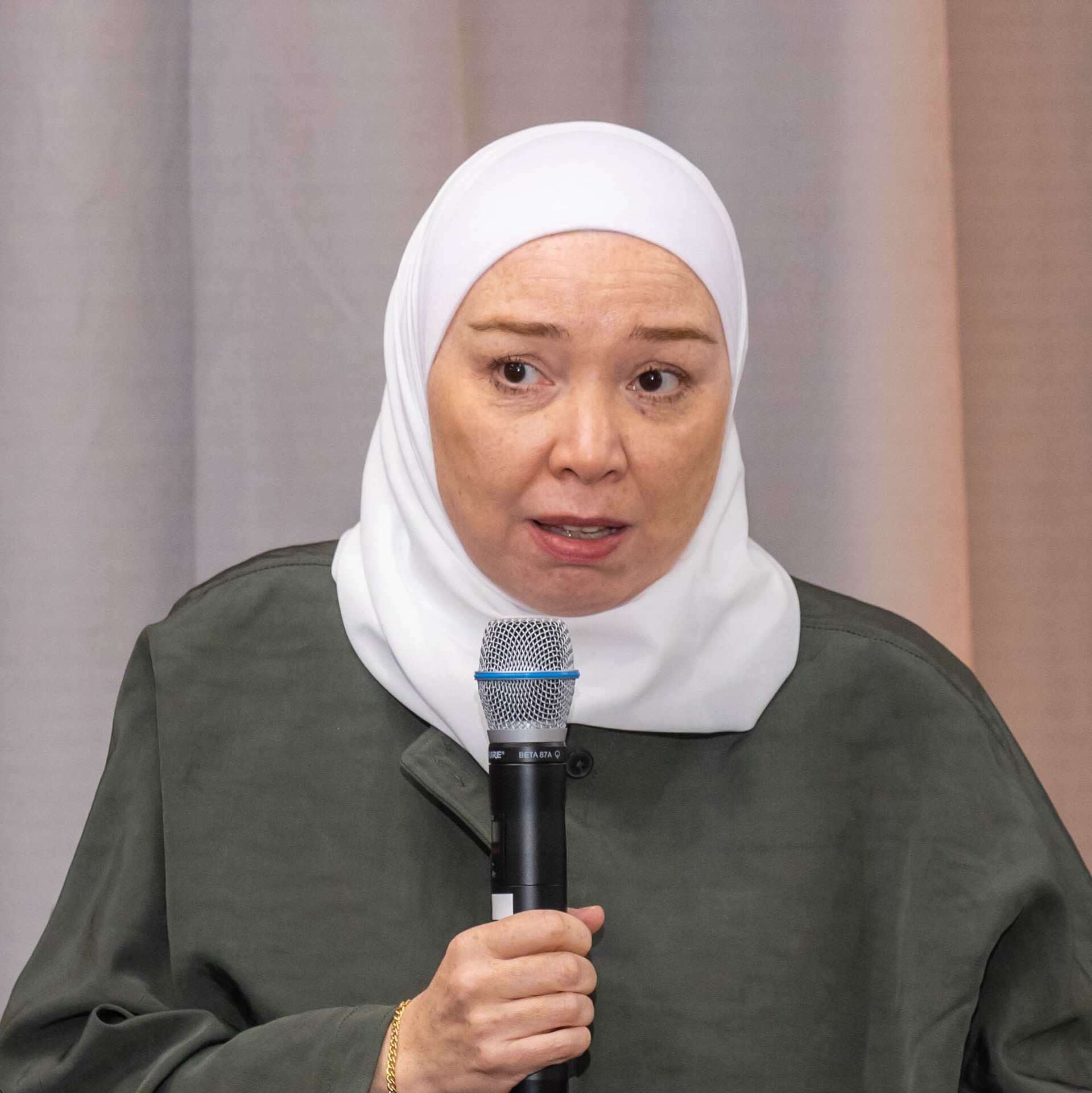
- Abir Haj Ibrahim in 2024
- Born: 3 April 1973 (age 52); Damascus, Syria
- Known for: peace activism

Abir Haj Ibrahim (born 3 April 1973) is a Syrian peace activist known for her work in promoting non-violence and peacebuilding in the Middle East. She co-founded a company to train peace activists which won a Livia award. She was a finalist for the 2023 Women Building Peace Awards.

== Life ==
Ibrahim was born in Damascus on 3 April 1973. She had worked for the Total in Syria before she decided to assist peace. She was a co-founder of a civic training company called Mobaderoon which trains peace ambassadors. She became a trustee of International Alert and Mobaderoon won a 2014 Livia prize for encouraging non-violence.

In November 2023 she was in The Hague in the Netherlands for a "Shaping Feminist Foreign Policy Conference" organised by the Dutch government. The International Civil Society Action Network organised a side event on flexible feminist funding and Ibrahim was a panel member. She recounted how they had funding for peace initiatives earlier that year, but there had been catastrophic flooding in Turkey and Syria. Because the funding was flexible they were able to re-target the money. £25,000 was used to find temporary accommodation for 42 families and to support 500 volunteers.

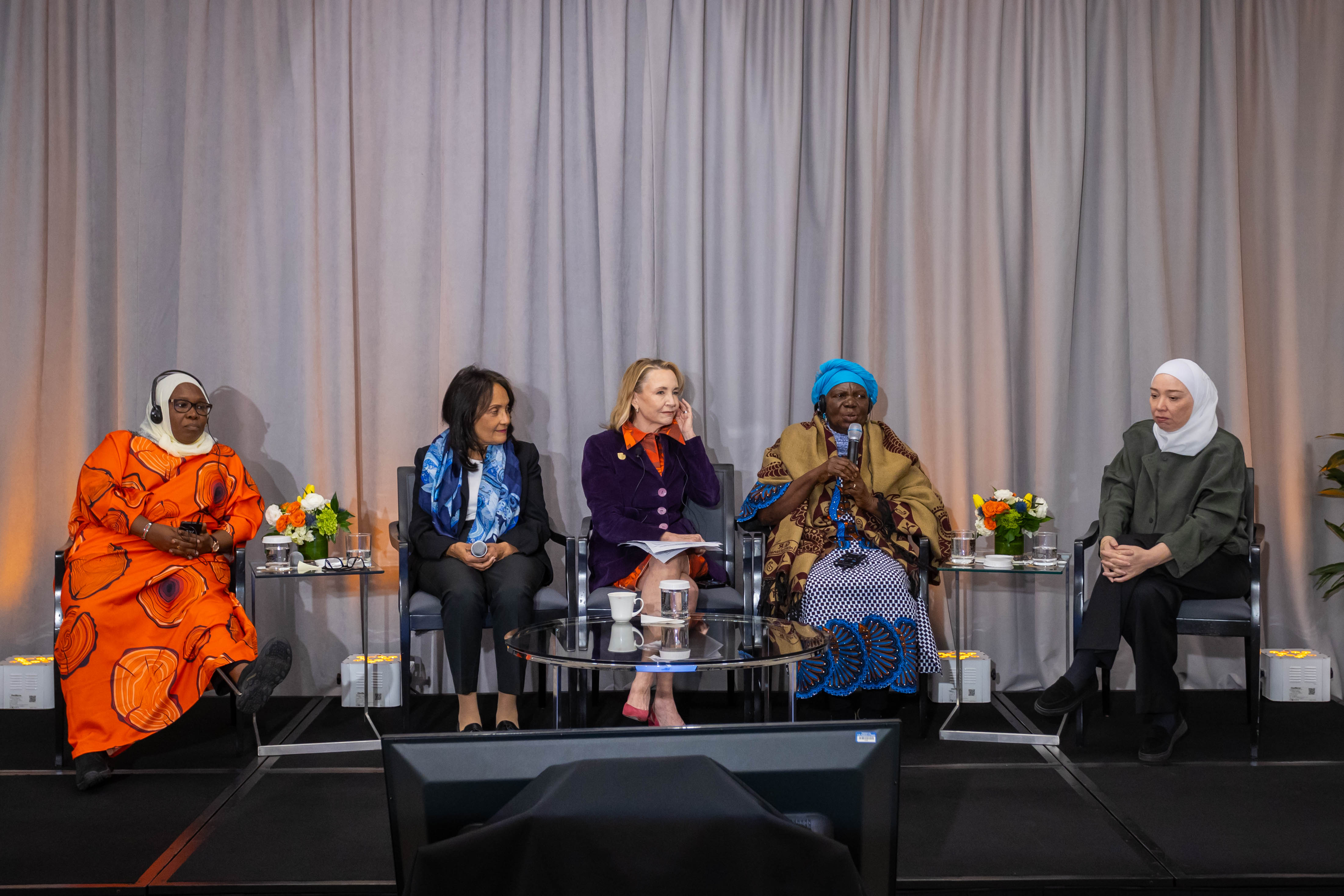
Four candidates at the Women Building Peace Awards. Hamisa Zaja, Marie-Marcelle Deschamps, USIP's Megan Beyer, Pétronille Vaweka and Ibrahim

She was one of four candidates at the United States Institute of Peace (USIP) in Washington DC for the Women Building Peace Awards. The other three were Pétronille Vaweka of the Democratic Republic of Congo, Dr. Marie-Marcelle Deschamps of Haiti, Hamisa Zaja from Kenya. Pétronille Vaweka became the 2024 Women Building Peace Award Laureate.

In October and November 2024 she was assisting the Special Envoy for Syria Geir O. Pedersen in briefing the UN's security council on the situation in Syria as a result of the war between Israel and Hamas. Israel had made 255 attacks of Syria including a bomb in Damascus.
