= Ituri (disambiguation) =

Ituri Province is a province in the northeastern Democratic Republic of the Congo.

Ituri may also refer to:

- Ituri Interim Administration, an interim administration in the northeastern Democratic Republic of the Congo
- Ituri District, a former district of the Democratic Republic of the Congo
- Ituri Rainforest
- Ituri River
- Ituri conflict (1999–present), ongoing insurgency
