= Ituri Interim Assembly =

Ituri Interim Assembly Assemblée intérimaire de l'Ituri

Type
- Type: Unicameral

Leadership
- Chairperson: Petronille Vaweka
- Seats: 32 assembly members

Meeting place
- Bunia, Democratic Republic of Congo

The Ituri Interim Assembly (French: Assemblée intérimaire de l'Ituri) was a 32-member legislative body that served as the legislature of Ituri region of the Democratic Republic of Congo. It was created in April 2003 by the Ituri Pacification Commission, a UN-sponsored commission that assessed the state of conflict in the Ituri region. Petronille Vaweka was the chairperson of the Assembly and represented the province in the National Assembly in Kinshasa.

== See also ==
- Ituri Interim Administration
