= University of Bunia =

University in the DRC

- Université de Bunia
- Type: Public university
- Established: 1994
- Rector: Jean-Faustin SIMBA AKOKOLA
- Academic staff: 22 Professors (including 20 visiting), 18 senior lecturers, and 43 assistants.
- Students: 1,613
- Undergraduates: Graduat
- Postgraduates: License, Doctorate
- Location: Bunia, Democratic Republic of the Congo; 1.5541°N 30.2481°E
- Language: French, Lingala

The University of Bunia (UNIBU) is a public higher education institution located in the city of Bunia, in the Ituri province of the Democratic Republic of the Congo.

== History ==
Officially recognized by the Ministry of Higher and University Education of the Democratic Republic of the Congo, the University of Bunia was established in 1994. It is located in the center of Bunia, in the Lumumba neighborhood on Liberation Boulevard, number 26; with a postal address of 292 Bunia. The university also has a new campus under construction in Tshere, about 7 km from the city of Bunia.

The University of Bunia was created as a higher education and university institution by Ministerial Decree No. ESU/CABMIN/0133/1994 dated 12 January 1994 as the Ituri University Center in Bunia (CUIB). It became an extension of the University of Kisangani (CUEB) by Ministerial Decree No. EDN/CABMIN/ESU/0021/1997 dated 4 October 1997. It was established to decentralize higher and university education as decided by the government, supported by the national sovereign conference, to alleviate overcrowded university cities and bring higher education to the hinterlands, given the distance from the three main university cities in the country (Kinshasa, Lubumbashi, and Kisangani).

== The university today ==
The CUEB was elevated to UNIBU by Ministerial Decree No. 157/MINESU/CABMIN/MML/EBK/PK/2010 dated 27 September 2010. Since 1994, the University of Bunia has been operating. Like many universities in the DRC today, UNIBU has also transitioned to the License, Master, and Doctorate (LMD) system since the 2021–2022 academic year.

== Organization ==
=== Administration ===
A management committee composed of five members directs UNIBU: the rector, the academic secretary general, the research secretary general, the administrative secretary general, and the budget administrator. The current rector of UNIBU is Professor Faustin SIMBA AKOKOLA.

=== Faculties ===
- Faculty of Law: undergraduate and license programs
- Faculty of Economic Sciences and Management: undergraduate and license programs
- Faculty of Agricultural Sciences: undergraduate and license programs
- Faculty of Social, Political, and Administrative Sciences: undergraduate and license programs
- Faculty of Human Medicine
- Faculty of Veterinary Medicine
- Faculty of Information and Communication Sciences: undergraduate and license programs
- Faculty of Computer Management: undergraduate and license programs
