= Megan Beyer =

American journalist

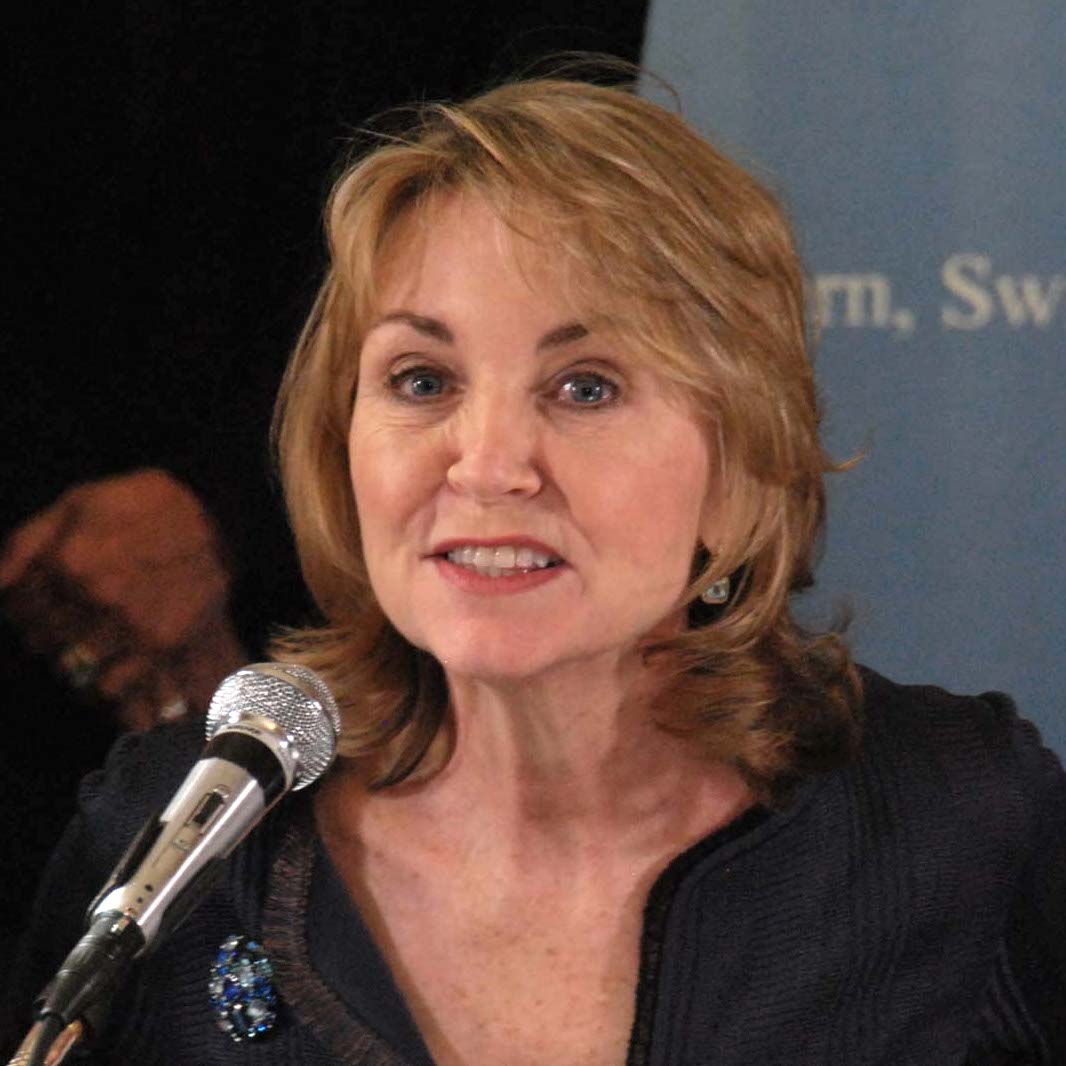
- Beyer in 2012

Director of the Office of Art in Embassies at the U.S. Department of State
- In office 2022–2024
- President: Joe Biden
- Preceded by: Ellen Susman
- Succeeded by: Margaret Chase Hager

CEO of the Consortium for Art and Culture in America
- Incumbent
- Assumed office 2025
- Preceded by: Office established

Second Lady of Virgina
- In role January 13, 1990 – January 17, 1998
- Lieutenant Governor: Don Beyer
- Preceded by: Lori Collins
- Succeeded by: Margaret Chase Hager

Personal details
- Born: Megan Carroll; June 5, 1957 (age 69) Alexandria, Virginia, U.S.
- Spouse: Don Beyer (m. 1987)
- Children: 2
- Education: University of Richmond
- Occupation: Journalist; activist

Megan Carroll Beyer (born June 5, 1957) is an American journalist and activist, focusing on the arts and women's issues. Beyer served as the Director of the Office of Art in Embassies at the U.S. Department of State, appointed by President Joe Biden from 2021 to 2024. She was appointed by president Barack Obama in 2014 as director of the President's Committee on the Arts and Humanities. She has served as an advisor to many arts and civic organizations, including Civic Nation, the American Film Institute, and the Better Angels Society. In 2025, with Karen Schuiling, she co-founded the Consortium for Art and Culture in America, a non-partisan, non-profit organization dedicated to advancing America’s cultural sector.

== Early life ==
Beyer was born in 1957 and raised in Alexandria, Virginia, to family physician Frank A. Carroll and his wife Suzanne Clarke Carroll, both of Scranton, Pennsylvania. She graduated magna cum laude in 1979 from the University of Richmond, majoring in journalism. In 1978, Beyer was inducted into the theater honorary society Alpha Psi Omega, the leadership honorary society Omicron Delta Kappa (ODK), and received the academic honor "Mortar Board."

== Career ==
=== News media ===
In 1984, Beyer began her career as a reporter covering education and politics for local and national television news programs. She was a regular contributor to Tamedia newspapers in Switzerland from 2010 to 2013. She was a regular panelist on PBS's To the Contrary, the only national television program devoted to women's issues. She has been a frequent columnist in various publications, including the Alexandria Times and Times Community Newspapers, a chain in Northern Virginia.

=== Advocacy ===
In 2010, Beyer founded the bilateral Swiss-U.S. project, Sister Republics, focusing on private market drivers to break the glass ceiling. In 2012, she led a study on behalf of the George Washington University Global Women's Initiative, "Gender Equality in Employment: Policies and Practices in Switzerland and the U.S." It offered a comparative analysis of gender workplace issues affecting women in Switzerland and the United States, and included original research based on a poll of more than 1,000 Swiss workers. Beyer also served as the External Relations Representative for the Swiss-based EDGE Gender Certification, a company that certifies companies achieving a global standard of gender certification.

=== Tenure as PCAH executive director ===
Beyer served as executive director of the President's Committee on the Arts and Humanities (PCAH) from 2015 to January 2017. During her tenure, the Committee co-hosted the "South by South Lawn" event at the White House, and negotiated the transition of the Committee's TurnAround Arts program to the Kennedy Center.

==== 2016 U.S. cultural mission to Cuba ====
In April 2016, one month after President Obama’s historic visit to Havana, Beyer led a delegation of U.S. arts leaders to Cuba, that resulted in 15 bilateral agreements. The trip, coordinated with the National Endowment for the Arts, the National Endowment for the Humanities, and the Smithsonian Institution, resulted in an array of collaborations between U.S. and Cuban cultural agencies. In addition to a series of ten bilateral meetings between U.S. and Cuban cultural officials, U.S. artists and art leaders visited Cuban schools, studios, theaters and historic institutions. Some of America’s most iconic artists participated in these visits, including Usher, Smokey Robinson, Kal Penn, Joshua Bell, Alfre Woodard, Dave Matthews, John Guare, John Lloyd Young and others.. The final day, the delegation publicly announced agreement on six collaborations, the first government-to-government agreement after Obama's extended hand of friendship to the Cuban people at the Grand Teatro in Havana.

==== Arts outreach to under-performing schools ====
A program called Turnaround Arts, funded mostly by donations from businesses and private foundations with support from government sources, sought to help some of the worst-performing schools in America. Stars such as Elton John, Yo-Yo Ma and Cameron Diaz united to help failing pupils across the United States. An independent study showed scores increased at targeted school by 23% in math and a 13% in reading in three years.

==== Report to the President ====
Beyer presented the 2009–16 PCAH report to the White House, summarizing accomplishments of the Obama administration's contributions to expanding cultural activities in the United States.

==== Consortium for Art and Culture in America ====
In 2025, Beyer co-founded the Consortium for Art and Culture in America, a non-partisan, non-profit organization dedicated to advancing the cultural sector.The Consortium brings together arts and cultural organizations to promote research, education, and public policy initiatives highlighting the role of arts and culture in economic development, health, education, global engagement, and social cohesion.

== Awards and past community service ==
Over the past 25 years Beyer has served on more than a dozen national, state and local boards. She served as Finance Chair on the Virginia State Board for Community Colleges; on the board of the Virginia Foundation for Community College Education; as a trustee of Washington's public television station, WETA-TV; and on the national board of Reading Is Fundamental. She held leadership positions in the Obama presidential campaign, including as Mid Atlantic finance chair for Women for Obama; as a member of the leadership committee of Women for Obama in Virginia; as a member of the National Finance Committee; and as co-chair of the National Women's Leadership Initiative Conference; and as Chair of the Women's Leadership Forum at the Democratic National Committee.

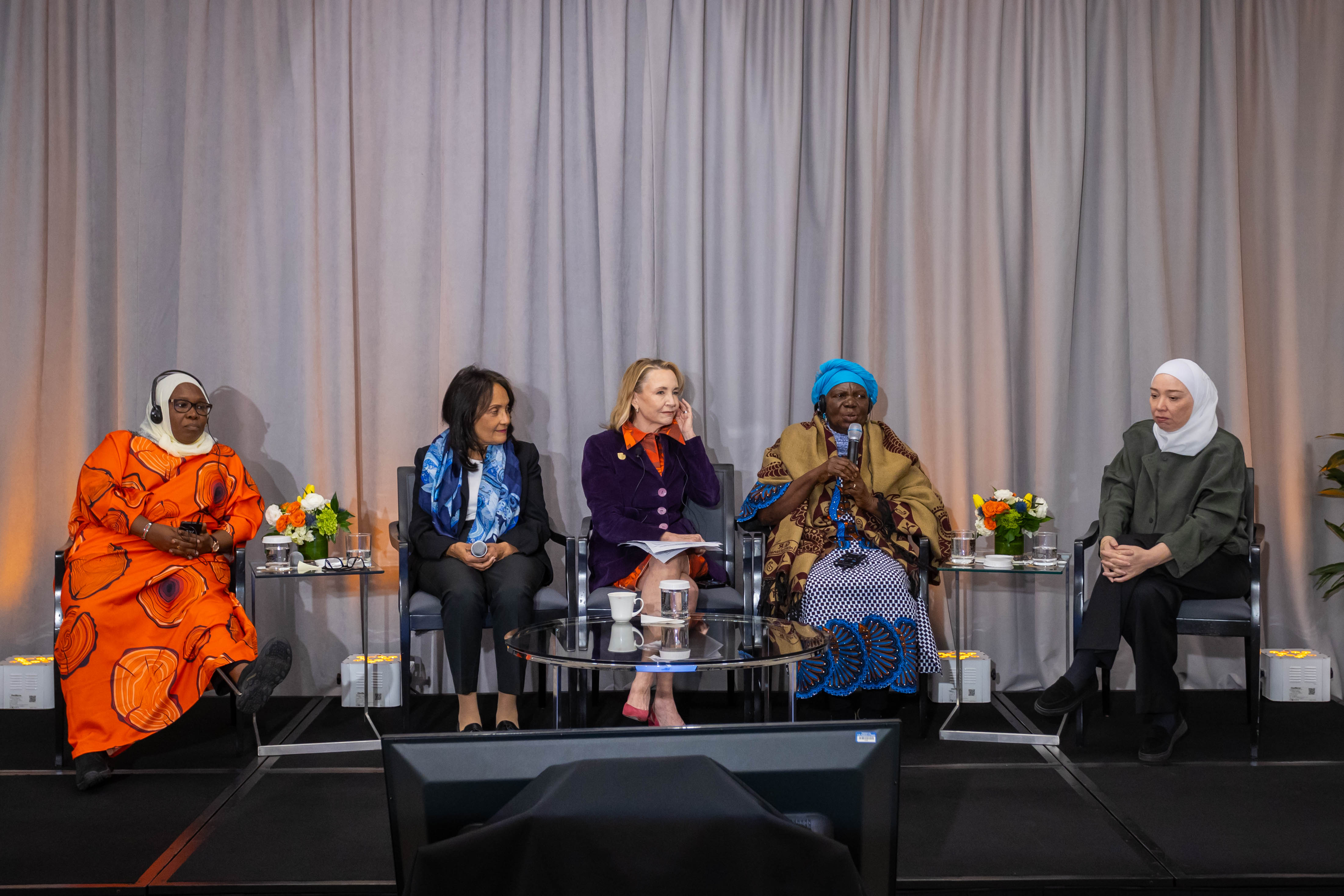
Four candidates at the Women Building Peace Awards. Hamisa Zaja, Marie-Marcelle Deschamps, Beyer, Pétronille Vaweka and Abir Haj Ibrahim

Beyer received two Emmy nominations and a Virginia Associated Press award for her work at WTVR in Richmond. In May 2008, she was commencement speaker at Blue Ridge Community College. Her lifelong involvement in civic affairs includes service on the boards of the Virginia-Israel Commission; the Woodlawn Plantation; the Athenaeum, an historic property in Alexandria, Virginia; Prevent Blindness Mid-Atlantic; the Medical Care for Children Partnership, a project in Fairfax County, Virginia; the Wolf Trap National Park for the Performing Arts; the Richmond Ballet; and Theatre IV, a stage production company in Richmond. In 1996, Beyer co-chaired, with Lynda Johnson Robb, Every Child by Two, a project to immunize children in Virginia. She has been active in NARAL at the state and national levels, and in 2006 was honorary co-chair of NARAL's national fundraiser. Beyer spoke at the United Nations World Economic Ideas Sessions on gender equality, participated in the Geena Davis Gender in the Media panel on Women in Film. With Marcia Carlucci, Beyer cofounded the Women Building Peace Award at the US Institute of Peace. She is pictured here interviewing Pétronille Vaweka of the Democratic Republic of the Congo, the 2022 Women Building Peace Award. She spoke at the 2014 Obama White House Summit on Working Families.

== Appointments and Board Engagement ==
Beyer served on the boards of the Wolf Trap Center for the Performing Arts, Virginia Humanities, Wilson Center's Women and Public Service Project, The Woodlawn Plantation, The Library of Congress John W. Kluge Center, Women and Public Policy Program at the Harvard Kennedy School, and Meridian International.

== Personal life ==
Beyer resides in Old Town, Alexandria, VA, with her husband, U.S. Representative Don Beyer. She is the mother of Clara and Grace, and stepmother of Stephanie Beyer Kirby and Don Beyer III.

Government offices
Preceded by Daniel "Henry" Moran	Executive Director of the President's Committee on the Arts and Humanities; 2015 – January 2017	Succeeded by Vacant
