= Hamisa Zaja =

Kenyan empowering persons with disabilities

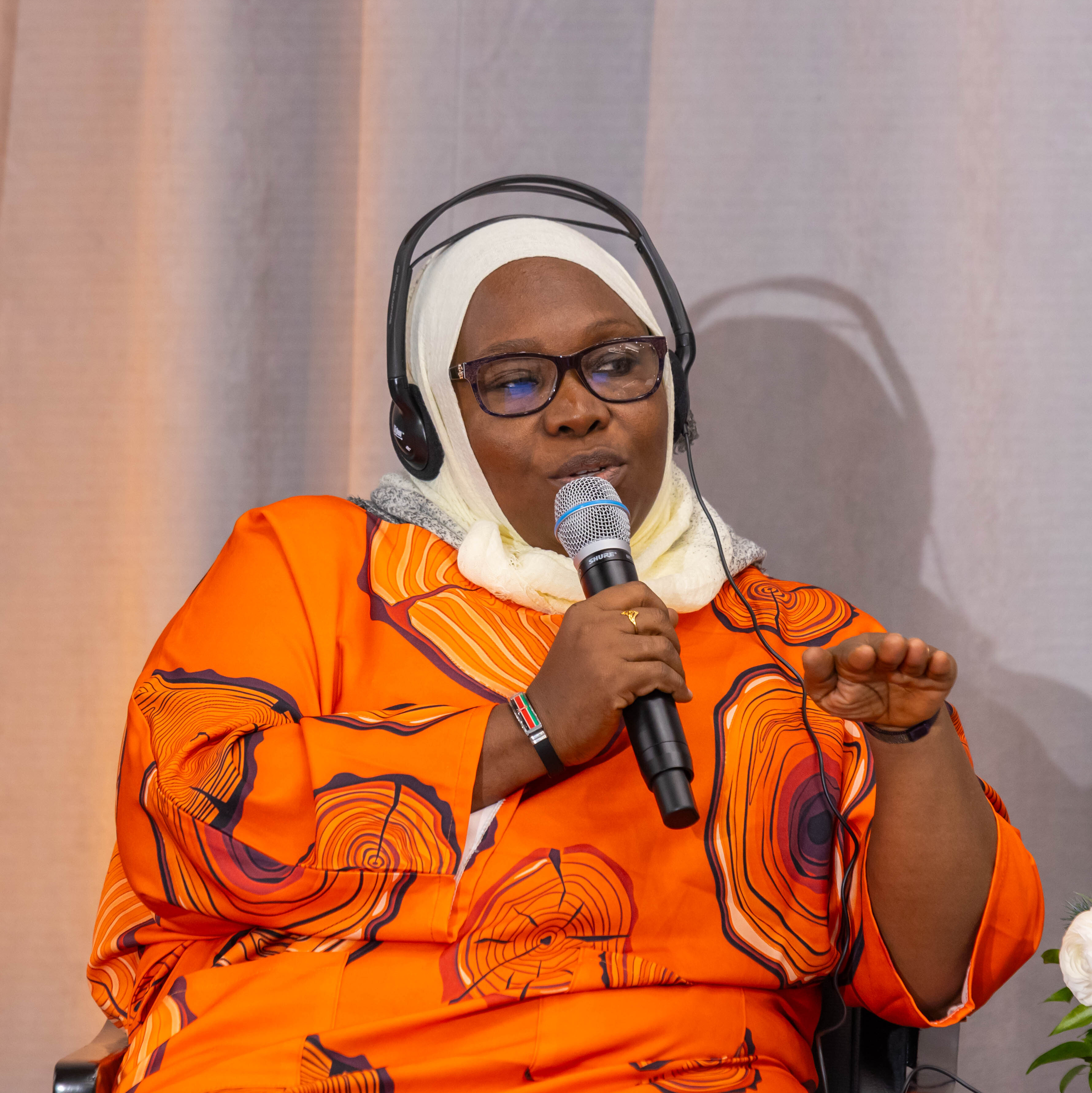
- in 2024
- Born: c.1972 Mombasa County
- Known for: disability activist
- Political party: United Green Movement party

Hamisa Zaja (c.1972 - ) is a Kenyan empowering persons with disabilities. She founded the Coastal Association for People with Disabilities. In 2024 she was a finalist in the United States Institute of Peace (USIP) International Women Building Peace Award.

== Life ==
Zaja was born in about 1972 in Kenya's Mombasa County. She was treated for fever when she was a child and as a result she has a paralysed leg. She went to Port Ritz School for the Physically Handicapped and then Mama Ngina Girls' Secondary School. She knew that her family organised marriages for their children, but no candidates were identified for her. She went on to graduate in business administration.

Zaja founded the Coastal Association for People with Disabilities. She was chosen to be on the U.S. Department of State’s International Visitor Leadership Program.

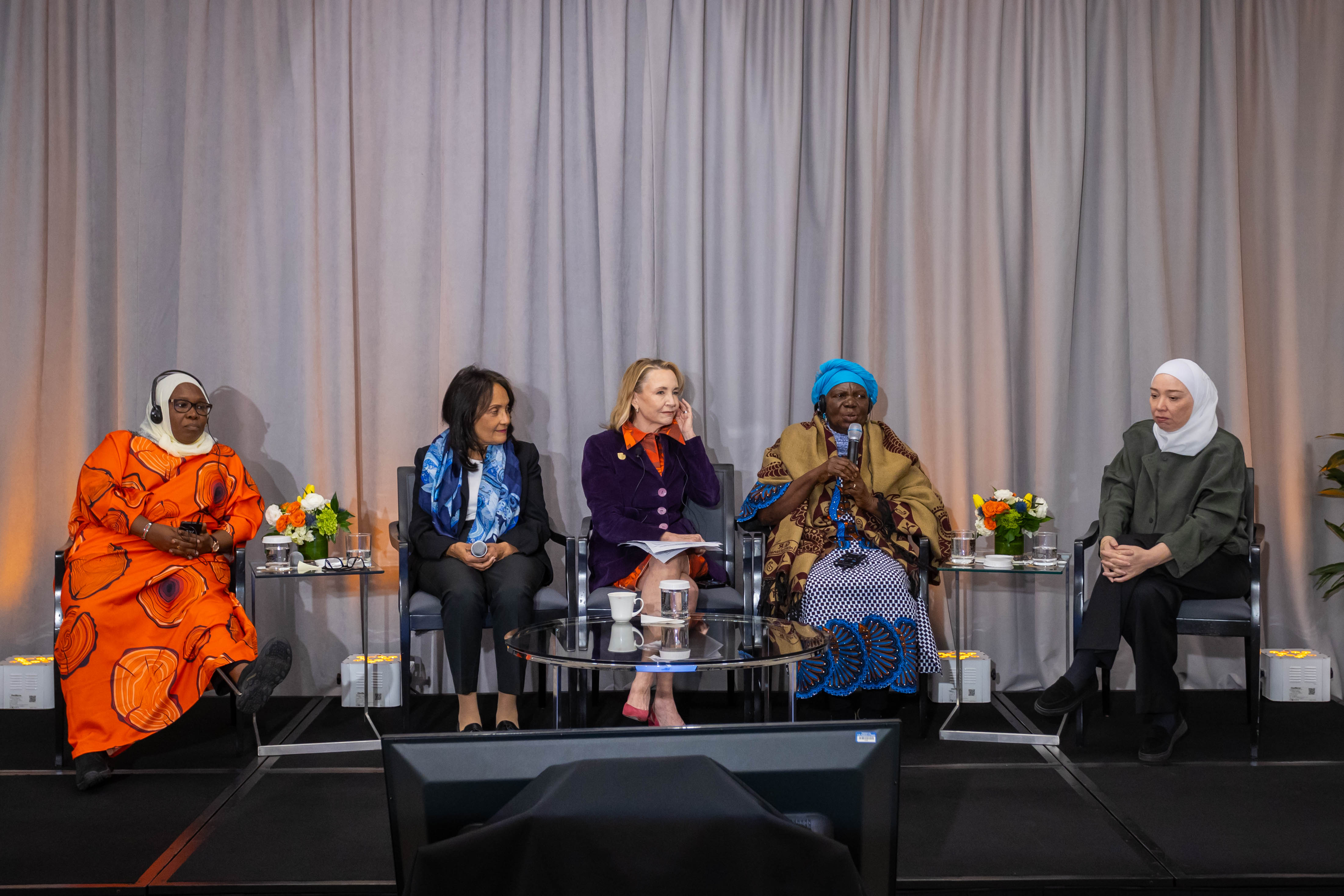
Four candidates at the Women Building Peace Awards. Zaja, Marie-Marcelle Deschamps, USIP's Megan Beyer, Pétronille Vaweka and Abir Haj Ibrahim

She was one of four candidates at the United States Institute of Peace (USIP) in Washington DC for the Women Building Peace Awards. The other three were Pétronille Vaweka of the Democratic Republic of Congo, Dr. Marie-Marcelle Deschamps of Haiti, Abir Haj Ibrahim from Syria. The award had previously been won in 2021 by Josephine Ekiru from Kenya. In 2024 Pétronille Vaweka became the Women Building Peace Award Laureate.

Zaja was one of fourteen women who stood for election to replace the Women's Representative Asha Hussein in Mombasa. She stood in 2022 on behalf of the United Green Movement party who are trying to end unfair inequalities. She believed that people with disabilities may be intimidated by others, including some police officers, from voting. She spoke out for better behaviour noting that the winners and losers in the ballot all had to live together after the election.

In 2024 she was championing the rights of people, and in particular women with disabilities, as the chairperson of the Coast Association for Persons Living with Disabilities. They noted that the United Nations that violence against women and girls can be achieved with impunity. She understood that severely disabled women may not be able to give informed consent, but her group believed that women who could be consulted had the right to conceive. They believed it was wrong that women with disabilities were obliged to use contraception or were sterilised when they should have been allowed to choose to have children.

== Private life ==
Zaja is married and has two children.
