= Geir Otto Pedersen =

Norwegian diplomat (born 1955)

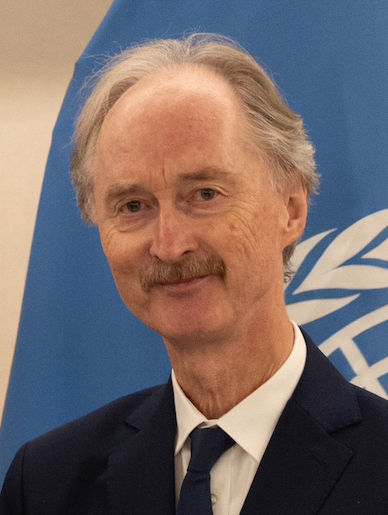
- Pedersen in 2024

United Nations Special Envoy for Syria
- In office 31 October 2018 – 18 September 2025
- Appointed by: António Guterres
- Preceded by: Staffan de Mistura

Personal details
- Born: September 28, 1955 (age 70) Oslo, Norway
- Children: 5

Geir Otto Pedersen (born 28 September 1955) is a Norwegian diplomat, who is the former and the most recent United Nations Special Envoy for Syria.

== Career ==
Born in Oslo, Pedersen is a cand.philol. by education and started working for the Norwegian Ministry of Foreign Affairs in 1985.

In 1993, Pedersen was a member of the Norwegian team to the Oslo negotiations, which led to the signing of the Declaration of Principles and mutual recognition between the Palestine Liberation Organization (PLO) and Israel. In the following years, from 1995 to 1998, Pedersen held several positions at the Norwegian Ministry of Foreign Affairs. In 1998, he was posted abroad, serving as the Norwegian Representative to the Palestinian Authority.

Pedersen later worked for the United Nations in several roles, which included as the Personal Representative of the United Nations Secretary-General for Southern Lebanon from 2005 to 2007, and following as the Special Coordinator for Lebanon from 2007 to 2008. He also served the United Nations as Director of the Asia and Pacific Division in the Department of Political Affairs.

He returned to the Ministry of Foreign Affairs as deputy under-secretary of state, then served as Norway's ambassador to the United Nations from 2012 to 2017 and to China from 2017 to 2018.

In January 2019, he started a tenure as the United Nations Special Envoy to Syria.

In October and November 2024 Abir Haj Ibrahim was assisting Pedersen in briefing the United Nations Security Council on the situation in Syria as a result of the war between Israel and Hamas. Israel had made 255 attacks directed towards Syria including a bomb in Damascus.

== Personal life ==
Pedersen is married and has five children.

Positions in intergovernmental organisations
Preceded by Staffan de Mistura	United Nations and Arab League Envoy to Syria; 2019–present	Incumbent
Diplomatic posts
Preceded by Morten Wetland	Norwegian Permanent Representative to the United Nations; 2012–2017	Succeeded by Tore Hattrem
Preceded by Svein Ole Sæther	Norwegian ambassador to China; 2017–2018	Succeeded by Signe Brudeset
