= Ituri Interim Administration =

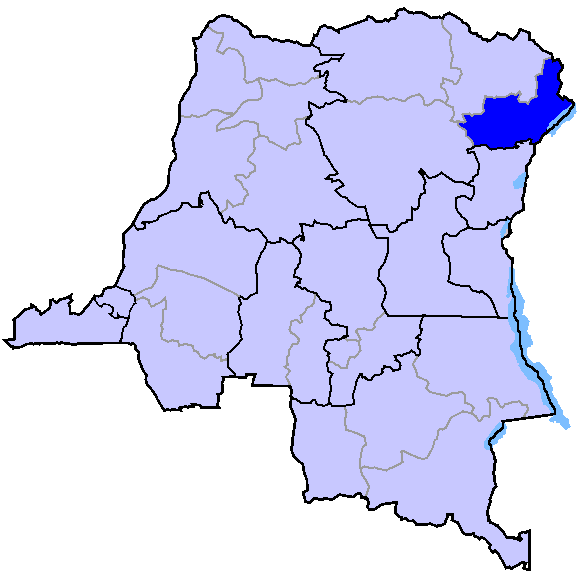
- Coordinates: 01°50′N 29°30′E
- Country: DR Congo
- Established: April 2003
- Capital: Bunia

Government
  - Type: Interim administration
  - Administrator: Emmanuel Leku Apuobo
  - Chairperson of the Assembly: Petronille Vaweka

Area
  - Total: 65,658 km^{2} (25,351 sq mi)

Population
  - Estimate (2003): 4,241,236
- Demonym: Iturite
- National language: Swahili

The Ituri Interim Administration was an interim body that administered the Ituri region of the Democratic Republic of Congo. It was established in 2003 by the Ituri Pacification Commission and supported by the UN mission in the DRC. The Ituri region became a province in its own right in 2015.

== History ==
Ituri District was created by an arrêté royal of 28 March 1912, which divided the Belgian Congo into 22 districts. Ituri, as Kibali-Ituri, was a province of the DRC from 1962 to 1966. Prior to the adoption of the 2006 Constitution of the Democratic Republic of the Congo, the legal status of Ituri was a topic of some dispute. From the beginning of the Second Congo War in 1998, it was held by soldiers of the Uganda People's Defense Force (UPDF) and the Ugandan-backed Movement for Liberation faction of the Rally for Congolese Democracy (RCD-ML). In June 1999, the commander of UPDF forces in the DRC, Brig. Gen. James Kazini, ignored the protests of RCD-ML leaders and re-created the province of Kibali-Ituri out of the eastern section of the northeastern Orientale Province. It is almost always referred to simply as Ituri. The capital was Bunia. The creation of a new province under the governorship of a Hema contributed to the start of the current Ituri conflict, that has caused thousands of deaths. Most official cartographers did not include the new province, and those referring to it as a "province" rather than a "region" were sometimes viewed as having a pro-Uganda bias. With the new constitution, Ituri's status as a proposed province was finally settled.

The current Ituri Interim Administration was formed through the efforts of the Ituri Pacification Commission, a commission sponsored by the United Nations Organization Mission in Democratic Republic of the Congo (MONUC, abbreviation of the French name "Mission de l'Organisation des Nations Unies en République Démocratique du Congo") that was set up, after much initial delay, in 2003 after the pull-out of Ugandan troops from the district. It led to the creation of the Ituri Interim Assembly, which elected an administrator and an assembly chairperson; the current assembly chairperson is Petronille Vaweka, who is also the sole deputy for the district to the National Assembly in Kinshasa.

The district is currently recognized as a district of Orientale. The Interim Assembly will be reconstituted or replaced by a provincial assembly under the 2006 constitution. An election for the governor and vice-governor will also be held, and the district will be re-created as a province of the DRC.

== Structure of the Ituri Interim Administration ==
The Ituri Interim Administration consisted of:

- A five-member executive led by interim Administrator Emmanuel Leku Apuobo. It was divided into four departments:
  - administration
  - infrastructure and reconstruction
  - economy and finances
  - human rights and social work
- An Ituri Interim Assembly of 32 members, led by Petronille Vaweka
- an eighteen-member commission for conflict prevention and verification
- a nine-member committee for dialogue between the armed groups
- a seventeen-member interim observer group on human rights violations

=== Leaders ===
==== Governor of Kibali-Ituri from 1962-1966 ====
- Sep 1962 - 28 Dec 1966 Jean Foster Manzikala

==== Governors of Kibali-Ituri since 1999 ====
- *1999* Adele Lotsoye Mugisa (appointed by James Kazini)
- December 1999 - early 2001 Ernest Uringi Padolo
- Dec. 2001 - November 2002 Joseph Eneku
- Feb. 2002 - ???? Jean-Pierre Mulondo Lonpondo

==== Administrator of the Ituri Interim Administration ====
- April 2003–2015 Emmanuel Leku Apuobo

== Geography ==
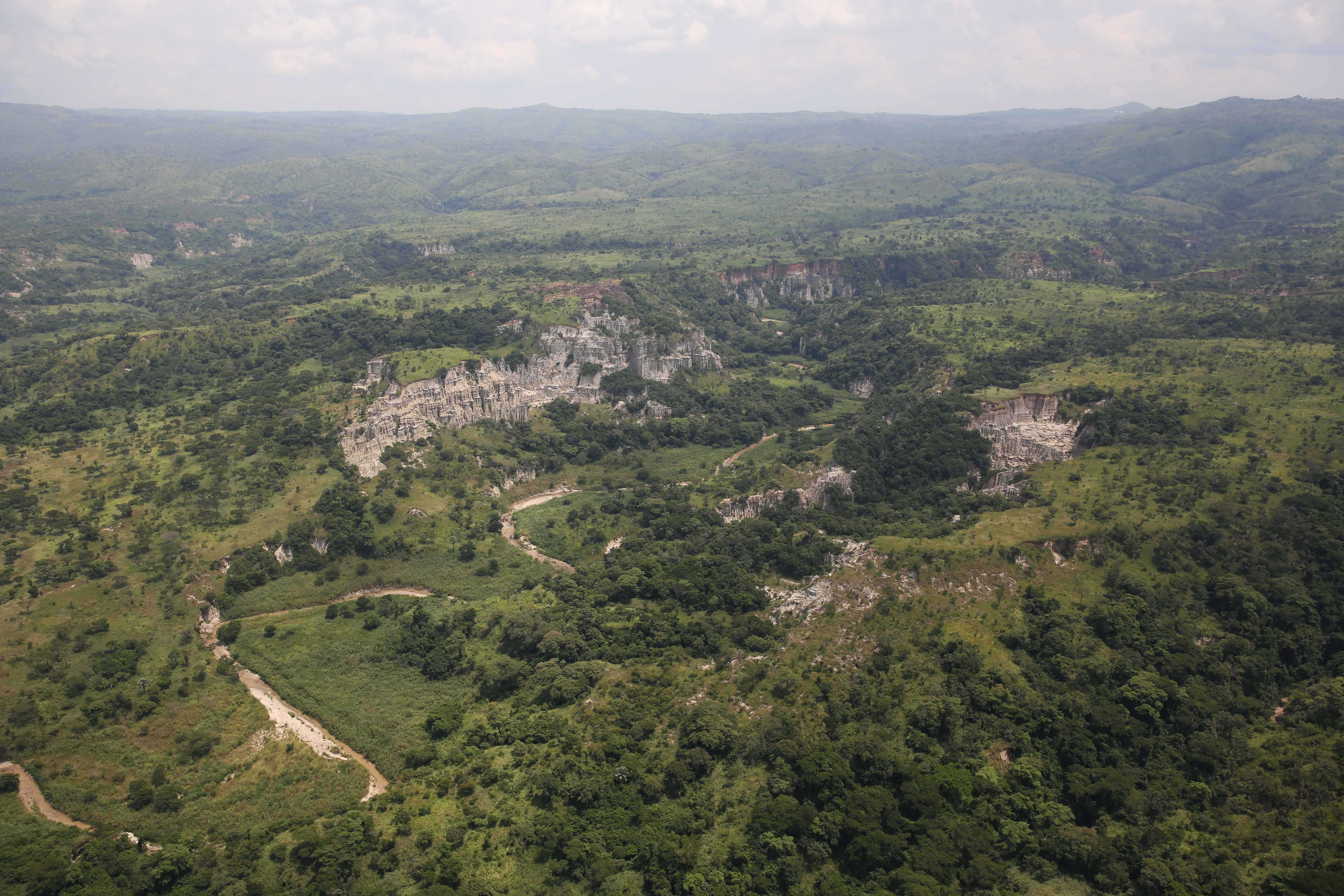
View of Ituri

The Ituri region is located northeast of the Ituri River and on the western side of Lake Albert. It has borders with the Uganda and South Sudan. Its five administrative territories are:

- Aru (6,740 km^{2})
- Djugu (8,184 km^{2})
- Irumu (8,730 km^{2})
- Mahagi (5,221 km^{2})
- Mambasa (36,783 km^{2})

Ituri is a region of high plateau (2000–5000 meters) that has a large tropical forest but also the landscape of savannah. The district has rare fauna, including the okapi, the national animal of the Congo. As for flora, an important species is Mangongo, whose leaves are used by the Mbuti to build their homes.

== Economy ==
The Kilo-Moto gold mines are located in the Ituri region. In the beginning of the 21st century, petroleum reserves have been found by Heritage Oil and Tullow Oil on the shores of Lake Albert.

== Demographics ==
The population is composed primarily of Alur, Hema, Lendu, Ngiti, Bira and Ndo-Okebo, with differing figures on which one of the groups constitutes the largest percentage of the population in the province. The Mbuti, a pygmy ethnic group, reside primarily in the Ituri forest near the Okapi Wildlife Reserve, although some Mbuti have been forced into the urban areas in recent years by deforestation, over-hunting and violence.

== See also ==
- Ituri conflict
- Provinces of the Democratic Republic of the Congo
