= Petronille Vaweka =

Congolese politician and activist

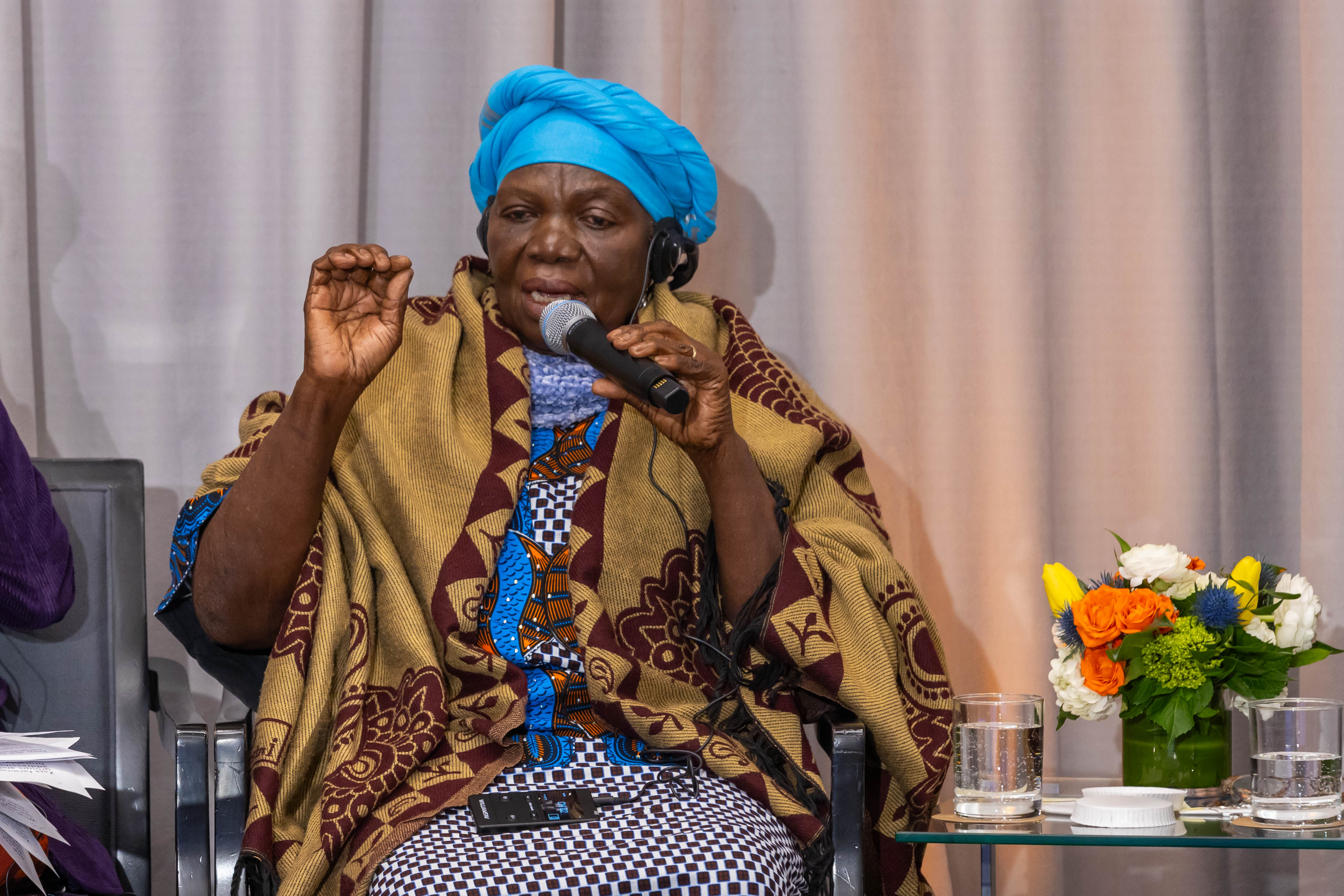
Petronille Vaweka in 2024

Petronille Vaweka (born 1948), is a humanitarian NGO activist who led the Ituri Interim Assembly of Ituri Interim Administration, while in transition from the status of a district of Orientale Province to a province of the Democratic Republic of the Congo. She won the Women Building Peace Award in 2023.

== Life ==
Vaweka was born in about 1948. She was brought up in small village near Lake Albert where her father's business was fish. She had a carefree childhood and she went to the Sisters of Mary Ingelmunster's school in the city of Bunia which is the capital of Ituri province.

She was to have six of her own children and a good number of grandchildren, but she also adopted more. She took on about thirty children and some of those she adopted had been child soldiers in the violence that was endemic in her country.

She became the interim chairperson of the Ituri Interim Assembly of Ituri Interim Administration, while in transition from the status of a district of Orientale Province to a province of the Democratic Republic of the Congo.

She worked with the Ituri Pacification Commission in 2003, which helped establish the assembly. In addition, she was elected as Ituri's representative to the National Assembly.

Formerly, Vaweka was the head of Fondation Paix Durable.

In 2024 she was of four candidates at the United States Institute of Peace (USIP) in Washington DC for the Women Building Peace Awards. The other three were the Kenyan Hamisa Zaja, Dr Marie-Marcelle Deschamps of Haiti and Abir Haj Ibrahim from Syria. In 2024 Pétronille Vaweka became the 2023 Women Building Peace Award Laureate.

Her achievements have been lauded by the United Narions and her face was displayed as part of a UN "Peace Begins with Her" campaign, outside the UN headquarters in New York in 2023.

== See also ==
- Ituri Interim Administration
