= Marie-Marcelle Deschamps =

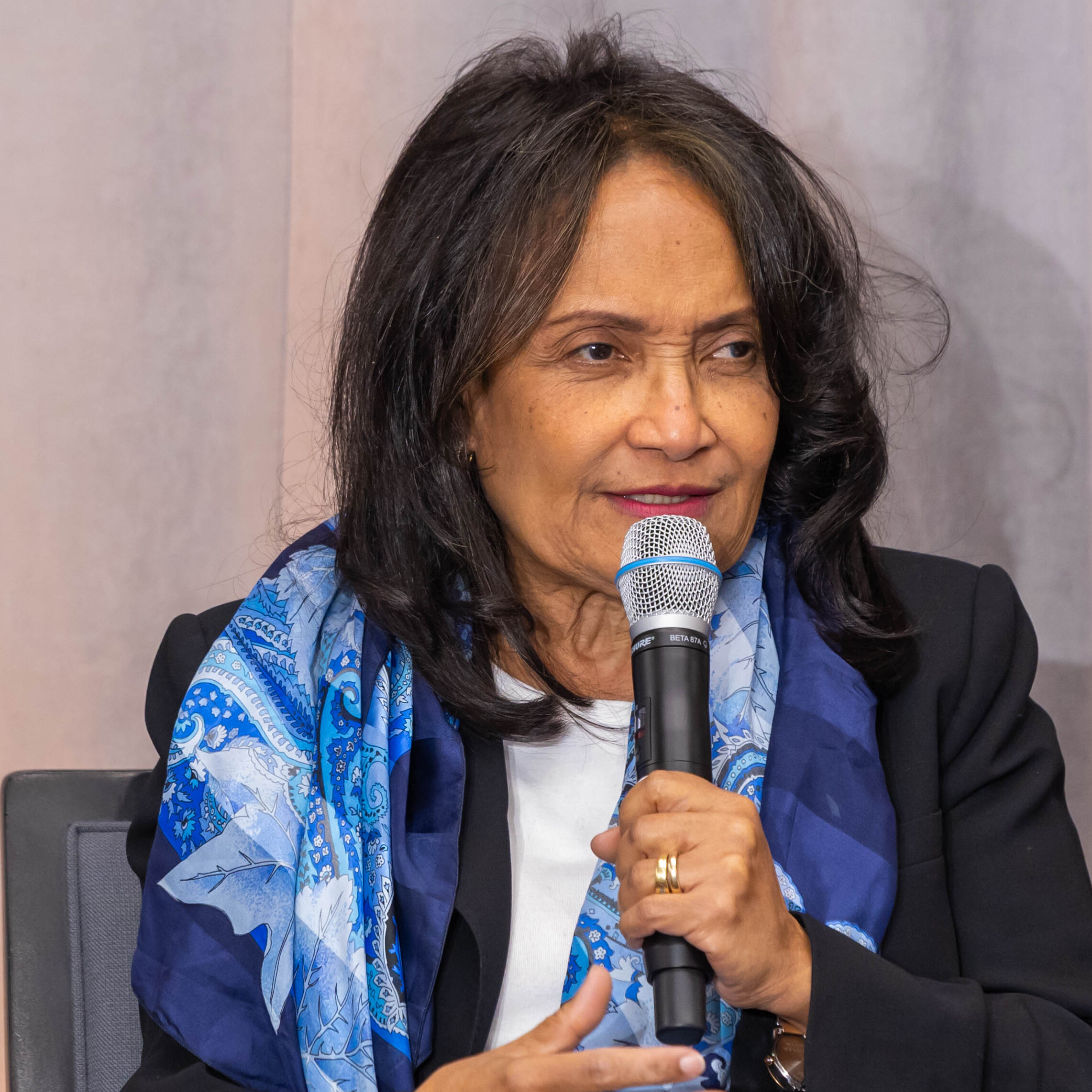
- in 2024
- Born: c.1953
- Education: State University of Haiti
- Occupation: doctor
- Employer: GHESKIO in Port-au-Prince

Marie-Marcelle Deschamps (born c.1953) is a Haitian doctor working to support women. She has received awards for her forty years leading the health facility that she helped found including the Legion of Merit. She was a finalist for the 2023 Women Building Peace Award.

== Life ==
Deschamps is from Haiti and she graduated from the State University of Haiti as a doctor in 1979. She trained under Anthony Fauci in the early 1980s as she completed post-graduate studies at the National Institute of Health in Maryland (NIH) and the U.S. Center for Disease Control and Prevention (CDC) in Atlanta.

Deschamps is considered one of the founders of GHESKIO in Port-au-Prince and its second in command. It is led by Jean William “Bill” Pape who started it in 1982. and she has worked there for over 40 years. Haiti has no president; its prime minister was exiled and the main hope of regaining order in 2024 was 300 Kenyan police officers who had arrived in 2024 to help a country subject to gang law and anarchy. GHESKIO had established itself as an AIDS and women's health centre but it grew into a hospital. The work focuses on supporting women heads of households and rape victims with both medicine, money and other assistance.

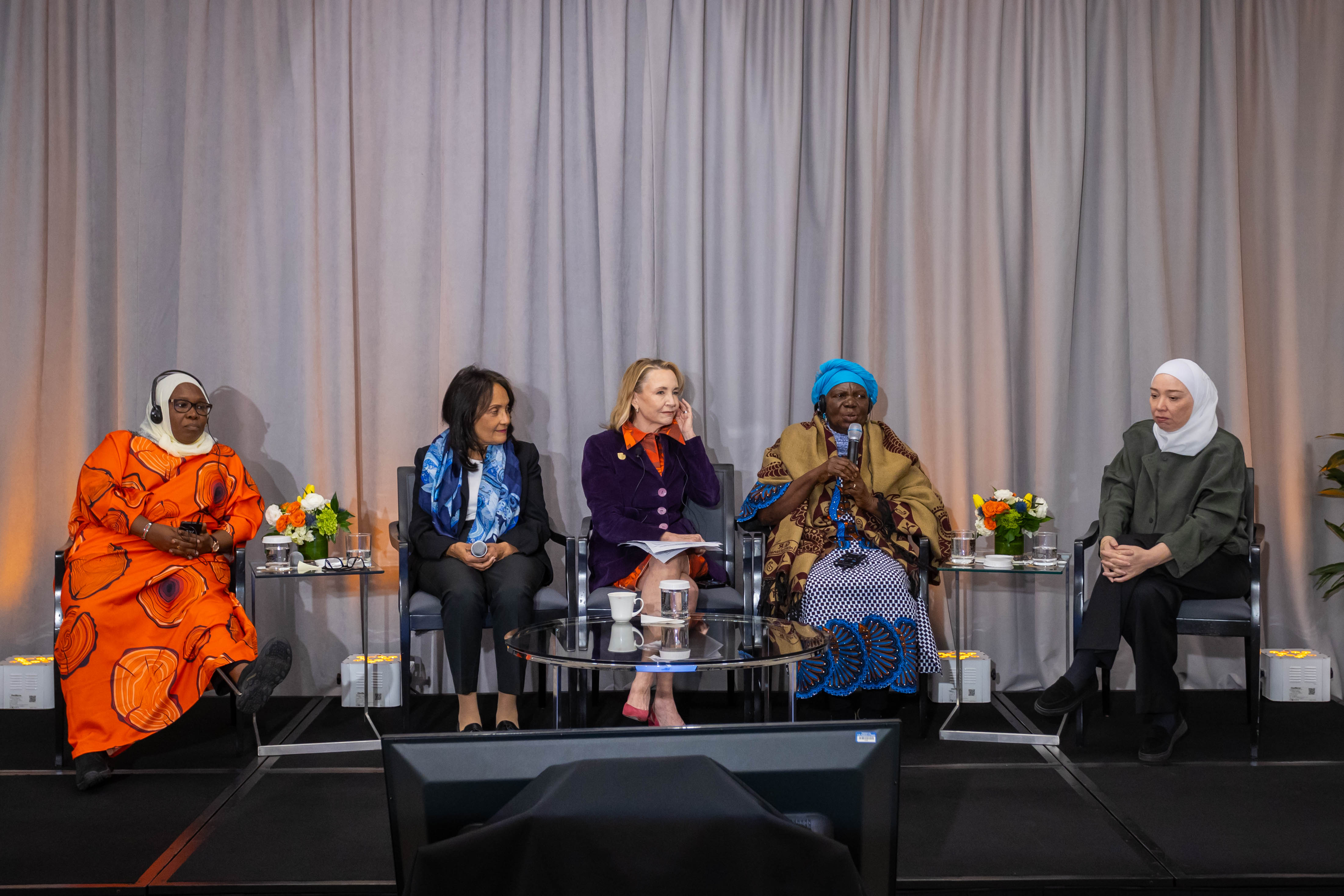
Four candidates at the Women Building Peace Awards. Hamisa Zaja, Marie-Marcelle Deschamps, USIP's Megan Beyer, Pétronille Vaweka and Abir Haj Ibrahim

In 2004, her work was recognised by the French president and she joined the Legion of Merit. In 2010, GHESKIO was given $1m, when it won the Annual Gates Award for Global Health.

She was one of four candidates at the United States Institute of Peace (USIP) in Washington DC for the Women Building Peace Awards. The other three were Pétronille Vaweka of the Democratic Republic of Congo, Kenyan Hamisa Zaja and Abir Haj Ibrahim from Syria. Pétronille Vaweka became the 2023 Women Building Peace Award Laureate.
