= Emmanuel Leku Apuobo =

Democratic Republic of the Congo politician

Emmanuel Leku Apuobo was the Administrator of the Ituri Interim Administration in the Democratic Republic of the Congo from April 2003 to 2016. The Administration governed Ituri District of Orientale Province until 2015, when it became Ituri Province.
