= United States Institute of Peace =

National organization in the United States (since 1984)

Coordinates: 38.8928°N 77.0507°W

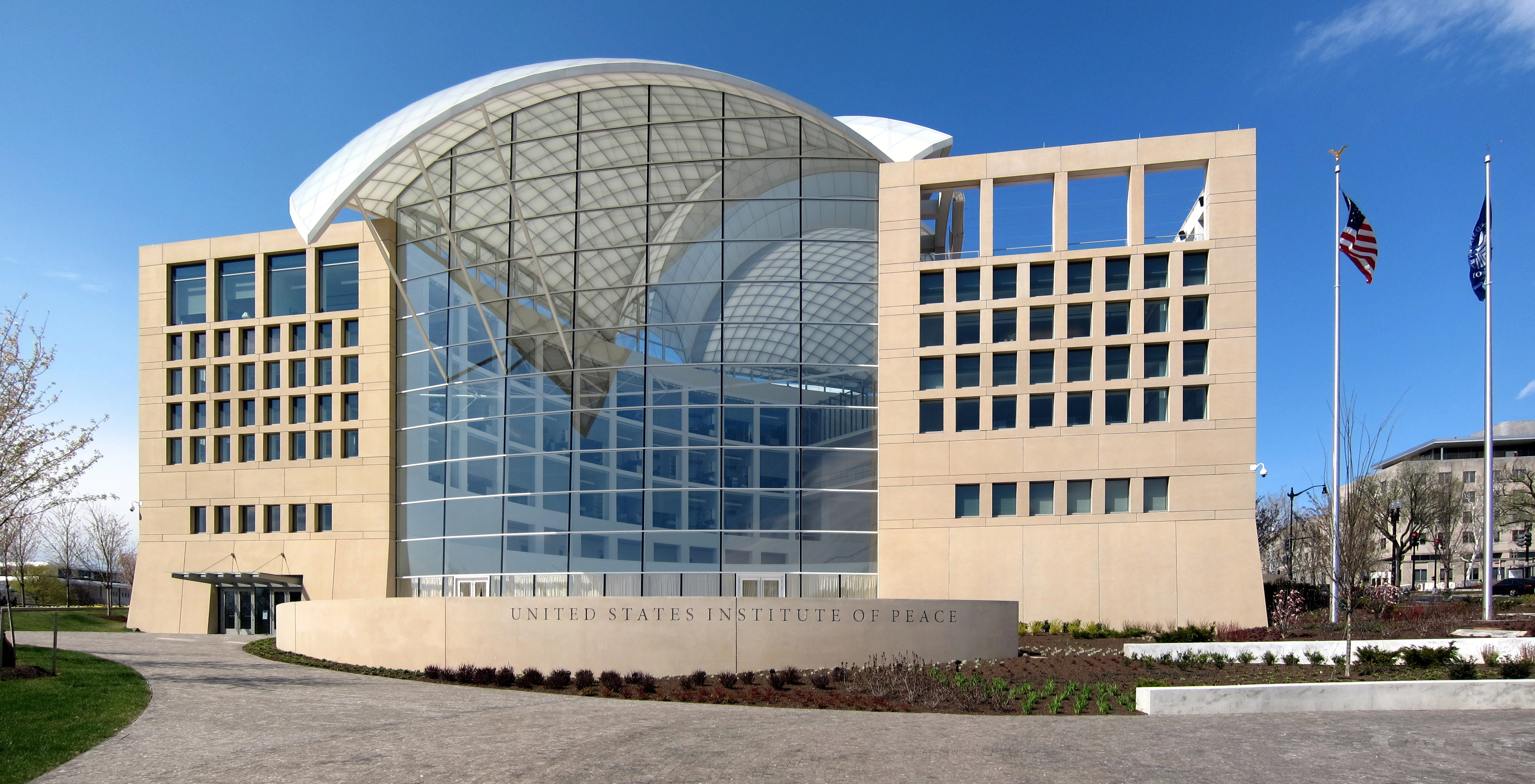
- USIP's headquarters in Washington, D.C., finished construction in 2011
- Abbreviation: USIP
- Formation: 1984
- Headquarters: United States Institute of Peace Headquarters; 2301 Constitution Avenue NW
- Location: Washington, D.C.
- President: Lise Grande
- Budget: $20 million (FY 2026)
- Website: usip.org

The United States Institute of Peace (USIP) is an American independent, nonprofit, national institute established and funded by the United States Congress and tasked with promoting conflict resolution and prevention worldwide. It provides research, analysis, and training in diplomacy, mediation, and other peace-building measures.

The institute's headquarters building is in the Foggy Bottom neighborhood of Washington, D.C., at the northwest corner of the National Mall near the Lincoln Memorial and Vietnam Veterans Memorial.

Following years of proposals for a national peace academy, USIP was established in 1984 by legislation signed by President Ronald Reagan. The institute is governed by a bipartisan 15-member board of directors, which must include the secretary of defense, the secretary of state, and the president of the National Defense University. The remaining 12 members are appointed by the president and confirmed by the Senate.

It has employed around 300 personnel and trained more than 65,000 professionals since its inception.

In February 2025, President Donald Trump signed an executive order announcing his intention to dismantle the USIP. In March, he ordered that most of USIP's board of directors be fired. Under statute, the president may remove board members with the approval of the majority of the board or several congressional committees. The Department of Government Efficiency entered the USIP building to replace its leadership, fire its staff, and assume building ownership. Some of USIP's former leadership contested the legality of these moves in court, citing the agency's independent structure, and on May 19, Judge Beryl Howell ruled in USIP's favor. The government filed an appeal and sought to stay the ruling. After Howell denied the stay request, the U.S. Court of Appeals for the D.C. Circuit granted a stay pending appeal on June 27, 2025, temporarily pausing enforcement of the decision while the appeal proceeds.

As of September 2025, the appeal was held in abeyance pending the Supreme Court's decision in Trump v. Slaughter.

In December 2025, the State Department announced that the institute had been renamed the "Donald J. Trump Institute of Peace," and President Donald Trump's name was attached to the facade of the building.

== History ==
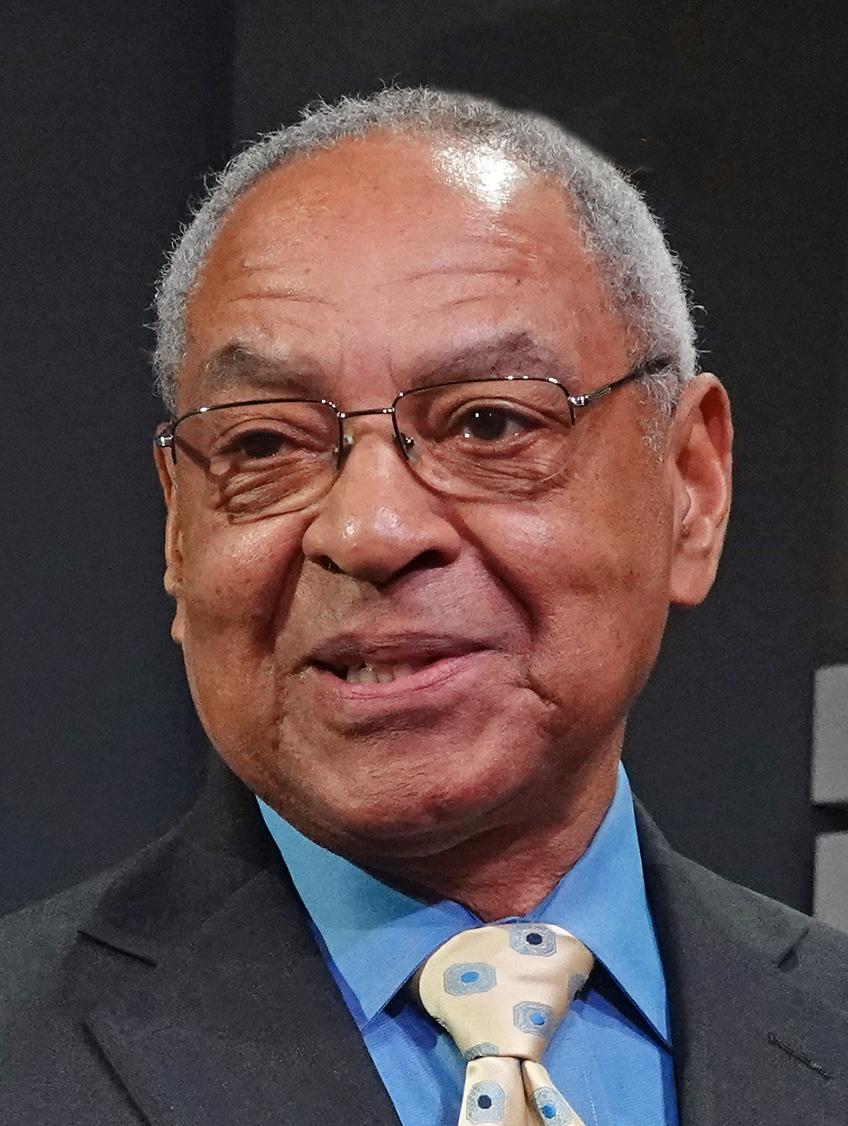
Ambassador George Moose, president and CEO of the U.S. Institute of Peace

The United States Institute of Peace was created in 1984 when President Ronald Reagan signed the Department of Defense Authorization Act, 1985. As part of his signing statement, Reagan wrote: "I have been advised by the Attorney General that section 1706(f), relating to the President's power to remove members of the Board of Directors of the Institute, is neither intended to, nor has the effect of, restricting the President's constitutional power to remove those officers." It was officially nonpartisan and independent, receiving funding only through a congressional appropriation to prevent outside influence.

Senator Jennings Randolph joined senators Mark Hatfield and Spark Matsunaga and Representative Dan Glickman in an effort to form a national peace academy akin to the national military academies. The 1984 act creating USIP followed from a 1981 recommendation of a commission formed to examine the peace academy issue appointed by President Jimmy Carter and chaired by Matsunaga.

Robert F. Turner was the institute's first president and CEO, holding that position from 1986 to 1987. He was followed by Ambassador Samuel W. Lewis (1987–1992), Ambassador Richard H. Solomon (1992–2012), and former congressman Jim Marshall (2012–2013). Kristin Lord served as acting president (2013–2014). Nancy Lindborg was sworn in as president on February 2, 2015 and served until 2020. Lise Grande was named the new president in October, 2020. She continued in that role until April 24, 2024. George Moose became the acting president and CEO.

In its early years, the institute sought to strengthen international conflict management and peacebuilding. In a 2011 letter of support for USIP, the Association of Professional Schools of International Affairs stated that this analytical work has "helped to build the conflict management and resolution field, both as an area of study and as an applied science".

Under Solomon's leadership, the institute expanded its operations in conflict zones and its training programs, initially in the Balkans and, after September 11, 2001, in Afghanistan and Iraq. It also became the home of several congressionally mandated blue-ribbon commissions, including the Iraq Study Group, the Congressional Commission on the Strategic Posture of the United States, and the Quadrennial Defense Review Independent Panel. Today, the institute conducts active programs in Afghanistan, Iraq, Libya, Pakistan, Sudan, South Sudan, and elsewhere.

In 1996, Congress authorized the Navy to transfer jurisdiction of the federal land—a portion of its Potomac Annex facility on what has been known as Navy Hill—to become the site of the permanent USIP headquarters, across the street from the National Mall at 23rd Street and Constitution Avenue NW, in Washington, D.C. Prior to its construction, the institute leased office space in downtown Washington. Construction of the headquarters building concluded in 2011.

=== Second Trump administration ===
President Donald Trump signed an executive order on February 19, 2025, stating that "the non-statutory components and functions" of a handful of governmental entities, including the U.S. Institute of Peace, "shall be eliminated to the maximum extent consistent with applicable law"; instructing them to "reduce the performance of their statutory functions and associated personnel to the minimum presence and function required by law"; and to "submit a report to the director of the Office of Management and Budget (OMB director) confirming compliance with this order and stating whether the governmental entity, or any components or functions thereof, are statutorily required and to what extent."

While some have interpreted the executive order as a move to terminate the institute, the United States Institute of Peace Act established the institute as an independent nonprofit institute, and 22 U.S.C. § 4601(b) provides a broad statutory mandate. 22 U.S.C. § 4608 limits the authority of the Office of Management and Budget to reviewing and submitting comments on the institute's congressional budget request. Under 22 U.S.C. § 4605(f), the president may remove USIP board members with the approval of the majority of the board or several congressional committees.

In March 2025, Trump said he was firing all USIP board members, except the three ex officio members. Trump also said he was firing institute president Moose and appointing Kenneth Jackson as acting president. The Department of Government Efficiency (DOGE) gained access to the USIP building to install Jackson as president. USIP contested the firings and DOGE's access as illegal. USIP leadership filed a lawsuit to stop the Trump administration's actions.

While the legal dispute between USIP and the Trump administration was pending, Judge Beryl Howell declined to issue a temporary restraining order to stop the Trump administration from proceeding with a takeover of USIP. On March 28, the Trump administration fired more than 200 USIP staffers, most of the remaining employees. The Trump administration appointed DOGE staffer Nate Cavanaugh as USIP president. Cavanaugh transferred ownership of the headquarters building to the General Services Administration. However, on May 19, Howell ruled in favor of USIP. The Associated Press summarized her ruling as "because the removal of the board by the administration was illegal, all subsequent actions are null and void, including the firing of the staff and the transfer of the headquarters to the General Services Administration."

On June 27, 2025, the D.C. Circuit Court of Appeals granted a stay pending appeal, temporarily pausing enforcement of the district court’s ruling. In its order, the court wrote that the institute exercises “significant executive power” in foreign policy decisions and that the President’s inability to control the institute’s exercise of those powers “undermines his ability to set and pursue his foreign policy objective.”

On December 3, 2025, the White House rebranded the headquarters building as the Donald J. Trump Institute of Peace and announced that it would host the official signing ceremony of a peace agreement between the Democratic Republic of Congo (DRC) and Rwanda.

== Congressional Mandate ==
The United States Institute of Peace Act, passed in 1984 and codified at 22 U.S.C. ch. 56, calls for the institute to "serve the people and the government through the widest possible range of education and training, basic and applied research opportunities, and peace information services on the means to promote international peace and the resolution of conflicts among the nations and peoples of the world without recourse to violence."

The institute carried out this mission by operating programs in conflict zones, conducting research and analysis, operating a training academy and public education center, providing grants for research and fieldwork, convening conferences and workshops, and building the academic and policy fields of international conflict management and peacebuilding. On many of its projects, the institute works in partnership with non-governmental organizations, higher and secondary educational institutions, international organizations, local organizations, and U.S. government agencies, including the State Department and the Department of Defense.

== Budget ==
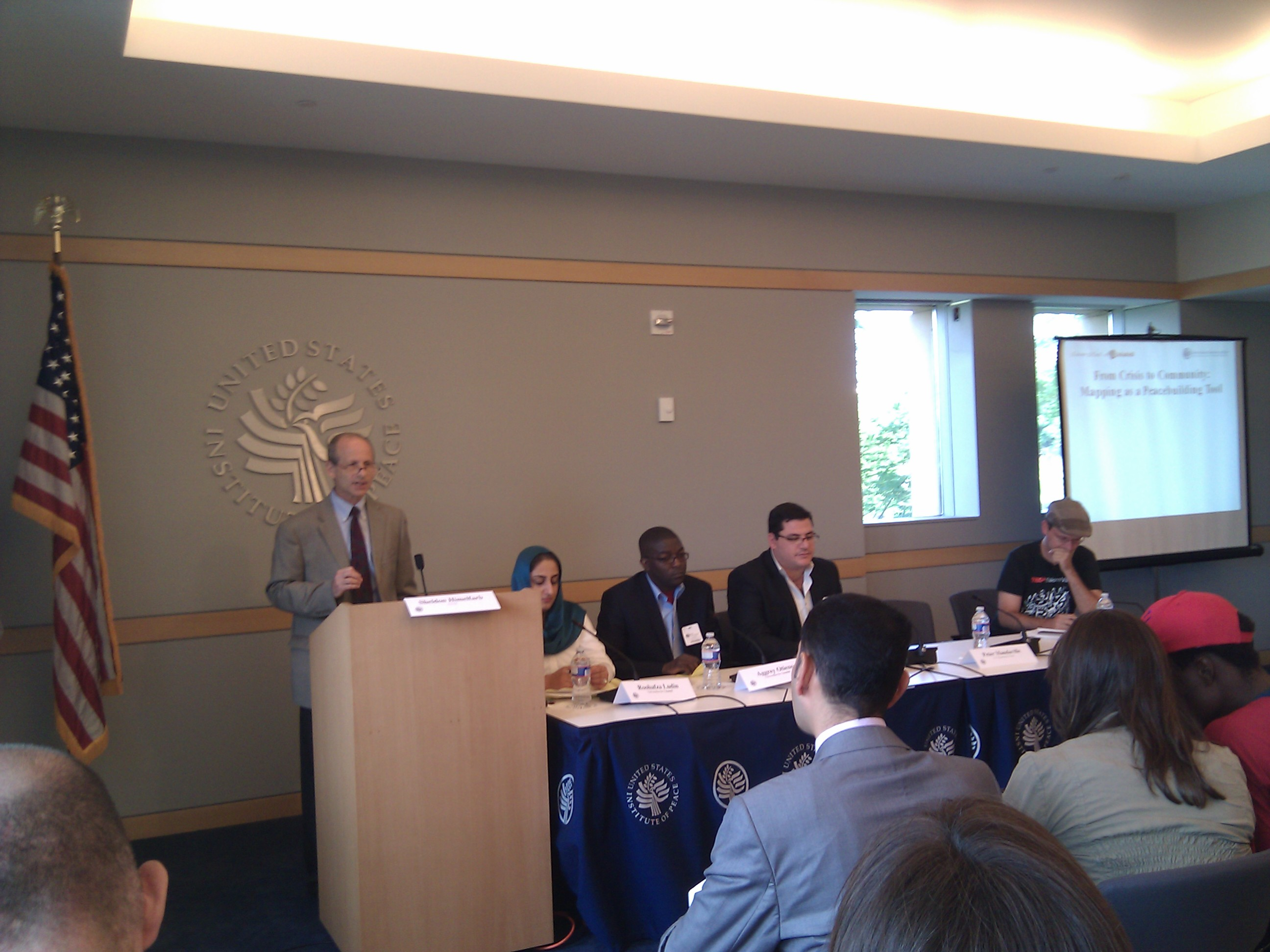
A USIP event

USIP is funded annually by the U.S. Congress. For fiscal year 2023 Congress provided $55 million. USIP leadership requested $65 million for its FY 2026 budget. Occasionally, USIP receives funds transferred from government agencies, such as the Department of State, USAID, and the Department of Defense. By law, USIP is prohibited from receiving private gifts and contributions for its program activities. The restriction on private fundraising was lifted for the public-private partnership to construct the USIP headquarters.

=== 2011 budget debate ===
An op-ed in the Wall Street Journal on February 16, 2011, by Republican congressman Jason Chaffetz of Utah and former Democratic congressman Anthony Weiner of New York, attacked funding for USIP as wasteful. Former U.S. Central Command commander Anthony Zinni wrote in a New York Times op-ed on March 7, 2011, however: "Congress would be hard-pressed to find an agency that does more with less. ... The institute's share of the proposed international affairs budget, $43 million, is minuscule: less than one-tenth of one percent of the State Department's budget, and one-hundredth of one percent of the Pentagon's."

On February 17, 2011, the House of Representatives for the 112th U.S. Congress voted to eliminate all funding for the U.S. Institute of Peace in FY 2011 continuing resolution. Funding for the institute was eventually restored by both the House and Senate on April 14, 2011, through the Department of Defense and Full-Year Continuing Appropriations Act of 2011.

== Organization and leadership ==
The institute's staff of more than 300 was split among its Washington headquarters, field offices, and temporary missions to conflict zones. The institute is active in some 17 countries.

=== Organization ===
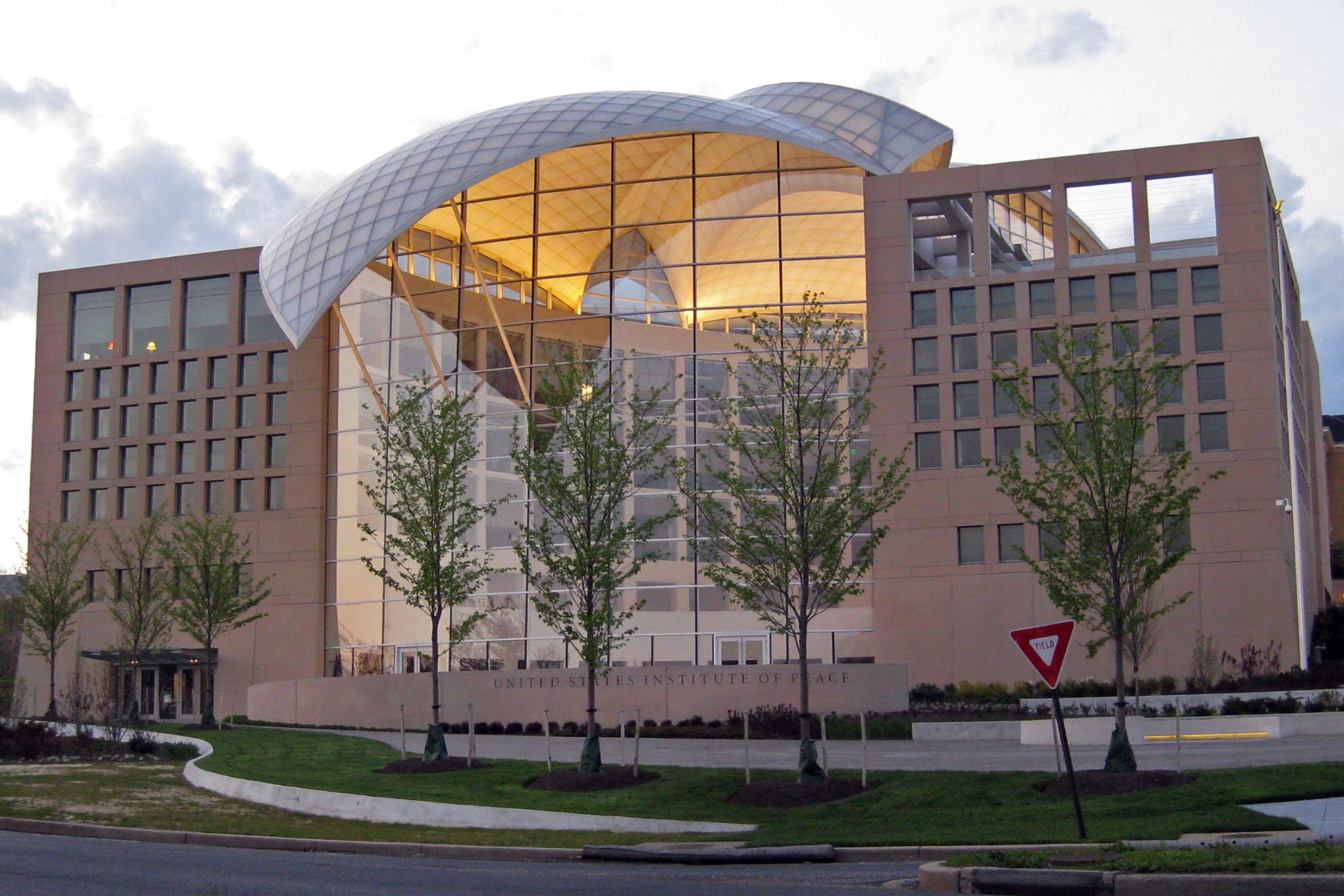
USIP headquarters building

USIP coordinates its work through seven main centers:

- Africa Center
- Asia Center
- Center for Civic Engagement and Scholarship
- Center for Thematic Excellence
- Gandhi-King Global Academy
- Middle East North Africa Center
- Russia and Europe Center

=== Board of directors ===
The board of directors is composed of 15 members, 12 of which are appointed by the president of the United States with the consent of the United States Senate. These have appropriate practical or academic experience in peace and conflict resolution efforts of the United States, and may not be officers and employees of the U.S. government. Members are appointed to terms of four years, but they may continue to serve on the board until a successor is confirmed. A member may not be appointed for more than two terms on the board.

In addition to the twelve appointed members, the U.S. secretary of state and the U.S. secretary of defense, or their designees from among their departments' Senate-confirmed officers, as well as the president of the National Defense University or, if designated, the vice president of the NDU, serve as ex officio members of the board.

No more than eight of all members may be affiliated with the same political party.

The board elects a chairperson and a vice chairperson from among its membership. A majority of the members of the board constitutes a quorum.

The board appoints the president of the institute, for an explicit term of years, who serves as a nonvoting ex officio member of the board.

=== Current board members ===
The board members as of May 24, 2026:

Position	Name	Party	Assumed office	Term expiration
Chair	Vacant (Note: John J. Sullivan was fired by Trump. He is contesting his firing in court.)			
Vice chair	Vacant (Note: Nancy Zirkin was fired by Trump. She is contesting her firing in court.)			
Member	Vacant (Note: Judy Ansley was fired by Trump. She is contesting her firing in court.)			
Member	Vacant (Note: Joseph L. Falk was fired by Trump. He is contesting his firing in court.)			
Member	Vacant (Note: Kerry Kennedy was fired by Trump. She is contesting her firing in court.)			
Member	Vacant (Note: Mary Swig was fired by Trump. She is contesting her firing in court.)			
Member	Vacant			
Member	Vacant			
Member	Vacant			
Member	Vacant			
Member	Vacant			
Member	Vacant			
Member (ex officio)	Marco Rubio	Republican	January 21, 2025	—
Member (ex officio)	Pete Hegseth	Republican	January 25, 2025	—
Member (ex officio)	Peter Garvin	Independent	October 11, 2021	—

== Projects ==
=== PeaceTech Lab ===
The PeaceTech Lab is a 501(c)(3) organization spun out of the United States Institute of Peace in 2014. It created the lab as a separate entity to further advance its core mission to prevent, mitigate, and reduce violent conflict around the world. The lab continues USIP's work developing technology and media tools for peacebuilding. In real terms, the lab brings together engineers, technologists, and data scientists from industry and academia, along with experts in peacebuilding from USIP, other government agencies, NGOs, and the conflict zones. These experts collaborate to design, develop, and deploy new and existing technology tools for conflict management and peacebuilding.

PeaceTech Lab CEO and founder Sheldon Himelfarb has proposed that an Intergovernmental Panel on the Information Environment (IPIE) be established along the lines of the IPCC to report on, among other things, how best to address the fake news crisis.

=== Convened tribes in Iraq ===
In Iraq in 2007, USIP helped broker the initial peace agreement that is seen as the turning point in the war there. USIP experts were asked to assist the U.S. Army's 10th Mountain Division in the reconciliation effort in Mahmoudiya, located in what was known as "the Triangle of Death" in Iraq's western Al Anbar Governorate. USIP was able to convene Sunni tribal leaders, Iraq's Shiite government leaders, and senior members of the U.S. military. Soon after the meeting, attacks and casualties declined significantly. The agreement led to a reduction of the U.S. military presence there from a brigade-level unit of about 3,500 soldiers to a battalion-level unit of about 650. General David Petraeus, the senior commander in Iraq, noted that the turnabout was "striking". Petraeus also said that USIP "is a great asset in developing stronger unity of effort between civilian and military elements of government".

=== Iraq Study Group ===
The U.S. government used USIP to help convene the bipartisan Iraq Study Group in 2006 that studied the conflict in Iraq and recommended ways forward. USIP facilitated the group's trip to Iraq and hosted several meetings of the group. According to USIP, the group's political neutrality made it an appropriate entity to host the group's sensitive deliberations. The effort was undertaken at the urging of several members of Congress with agreement of the White House. A final report was released to Congress, the White House, and the public on December 6, 2006.

=== Genocide Prevention Task Force ===
In Fall 2008, U.S. Institute of Peace, the U.S. Holocaust Memorial Museum, and the American Academy of Diplomacy jointly convened the Genocide Prevention Task Force to "spotlight genocide prevention as a national priority and to develop practical policy recommendations to enhance the capacity of the U.S. government to respond to emerging threats of genocide and mass atrocities".

The 14-member task force, co-chaired by former secretary of state Madeleine Albright and former defense secretary William Cohen, outlined "a national blueprint to prevent genocide and mass atrocities". In December 2008, the task force released its report "Preventing Genocide: A Blueprint for U.S. Policymakers" detailing its recommendations and guidelines. The Economist praised it as a "report steeped in good sense".

On August 4, 2011, U.S. president Barack Obama announced a proclamation suspending U.S. entry to individuals active in "serious human rights and humanitarian law violations" and called for the creation of an Atrocities Prevention Board to review, coordinate and develop an atrocity prevention and response policy, and incorporate recommendations provided by the Genocide Prevention Task Force.

=== The Iran Primer ===
The Iran Primer: Power, Politics, and U.S. Policy was in 2016 a "concise overview of Iran's politics, economy, military, foreign policy, and nuclear program". It convened 50 experts to discuss Iran's evolving relationship with the West and "chronicles U.S.-Iran relations under six American presidents and probed five options for dealing with Iran". The Iran Primer was edited by USIP staff member Robin Wright.

=== Women Building Peace Awards ===
In 2020 the Institute organised the Women Building Peace Awards. The first four winners were Rita Martin Lopidia of South Sudan, Josephine Ekiru from Kenya in 2021, María Eugenia Mosquera Riascos of Colombia in 2022 and in 2023 the winner was Pétronille Vaweka from the Democratic Republic of the Congo. Finalists in the contest have included Marie-Marcelle Deschamps from Haiti, Jayne W. Waithitu, disability rights activist Hamisa Zaja from Kenya and Irene Santiago from the Philippines.

== Headquarters ==
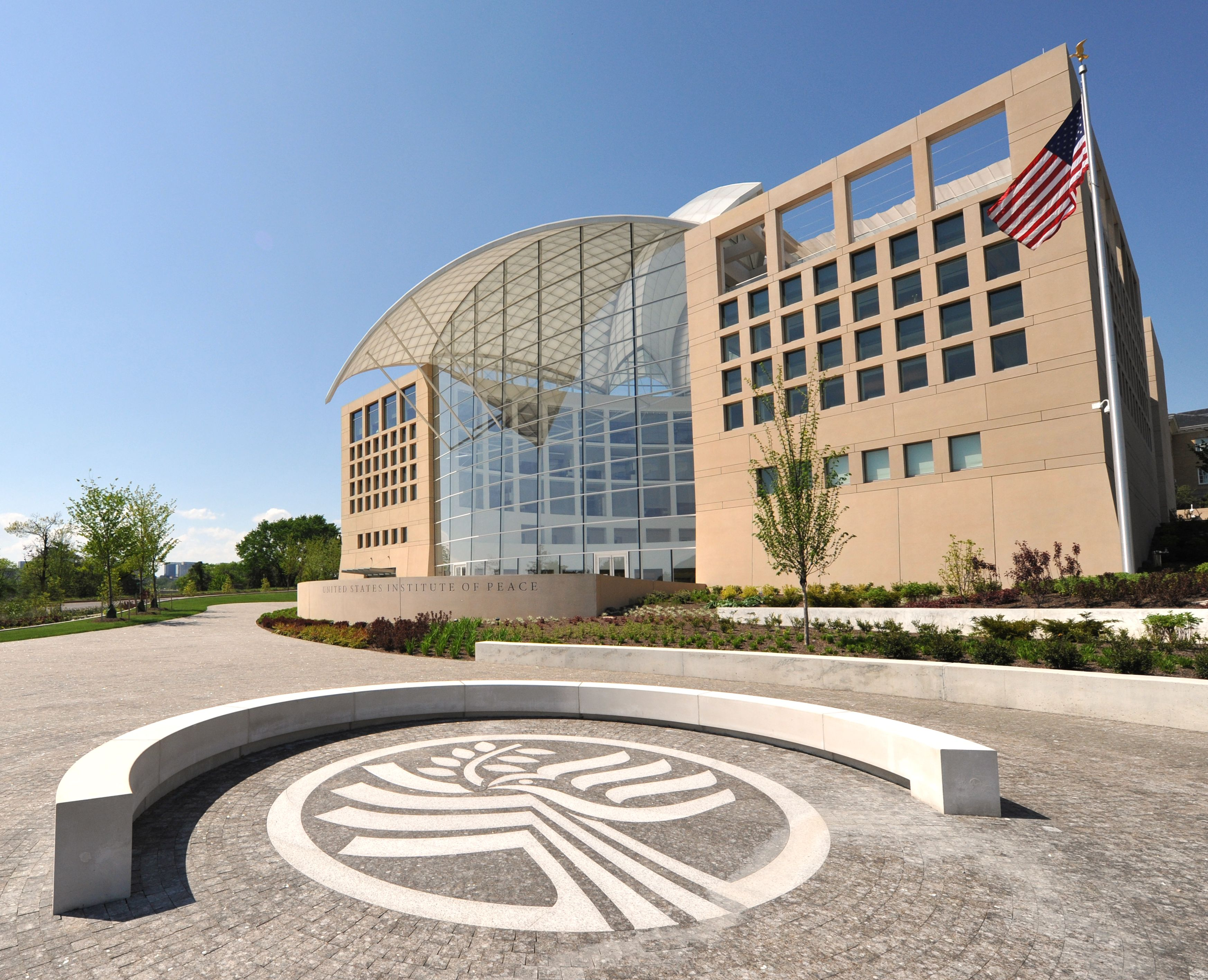
United States Institute of Peace headquarters in Washington, D.C.

In March 2011, USIP moved into the headquarters facility built for the institute at the northwest corner of the National Mall in Washington, D.C. Designed by Moshe Safdie architects and Buro Happold, the LEED-certified building aims to serve as a symbol of America's commitment to peacebuilding. The building housed offices and staff support facilities, a library, a conference center, auditorium, classrooms, and a public education center. Officials broke ground for the new headquarters in June 2008 at a ceremony that included President George W. Bush, Senate majority leader Harry Reid, and Speaker of the House Nancy Pelosi. The facility sits on land owned by the US Navy.

== Publications ==
USIP publishes a variety of topical newsletters, briefs, reports, guides, studies, testimony, and books related to peacebuilding and conflict management topics. It also maintains digital collections of peace agreements, oral histories, and information about truth commissions. The USIP headquarters is home to a public library that houses a collection of items related to peacebuilding, conflict management, and diplomacy. Its materials can be used on-site or requested through interlibrary loan.

In an interview with the politically progressive news website Truthout, Noam Chomsky described USIP's decision to release the Trump administration's 2018 National Defense Strategy on its website as a case where "lacking a sense of irony, the bureaucracy is quite happy to caricature Orwell."

== See also ==
- Title 22 of the Code of Federal Regulations
- Department of Peace
- List of peace activists
- ONU Law Rule of Law LL.M. Program
- Pacifism in the United States
- Justice Call
- Board of Peace
