= Atrocities Prevention Board =

American interagency committee to assess risks of atrocities

The Atrocities Prevention Board (APB) is an interagency committee consisting of U.S. officials from the National Security Council, the Departments of State, Defense, Justice, and Treasury, the U.S. Agency for International Development, and the U.S. Intelligence Community. The board meets monthly to assess the long-term risks of atrocities around the world.

== History ==
In 2007, former Secretary of State Madeleine Albright and former Secretary of Defense William Cohen formed a Genocide Prevention Task Force. In December 2008, with the onset of Barack Obama's election as President of the United States, the task force recommended the creation of a new high-level interagency body that would improve the U.S. government's crisis-response systems, better equip the government to mount coherent and timely preventive diplomatic strategies, and prepare interagency genocide prevention and response plans for high-risk situations.

In August 2011, President Barack Obama issued Presidential Study Directive 10 (PSD-10), which declared the prevention of mass atrocities and genocide to be a “core national security interest and core moral responsibility” of the United States and ordered the creation of the Atrocities Prevention Board. The board was officially formed on April 23, 2012, with Special Adviser for Multilateral Affairs Samantha Power appointed as the chair.

The board was loosely modeled after an Atrocities Prevention Interagency Working Group established by United States Ambassador-at-Large for War Crimes Issues David Scheffer at the end of the Clinton Administration.

On February 15, 2013, Power stepped down from her position in the National Security Council, and Stephen Pomper succeeded her as the chair of the APB.

== Criticism ==
The Atrocities Prevention Board has been viewed with mixed reception. Groups such as Human Rights Watch, Human Rights First, and the Friends Committee on National Legislation supported the President's decision to elevate the atrocity prevention agenda. However, the board has met considerable skepticism and criticism for its failure to prevent genocides in Syria, Iraq, the Central African Republic, and South Sudan.
