= Ituri Province =

Province of the Democratic Republic of the Congo

Ituri: Province de l'Ituri (French); Mkoa wa Ituri (Swahili)
- Province
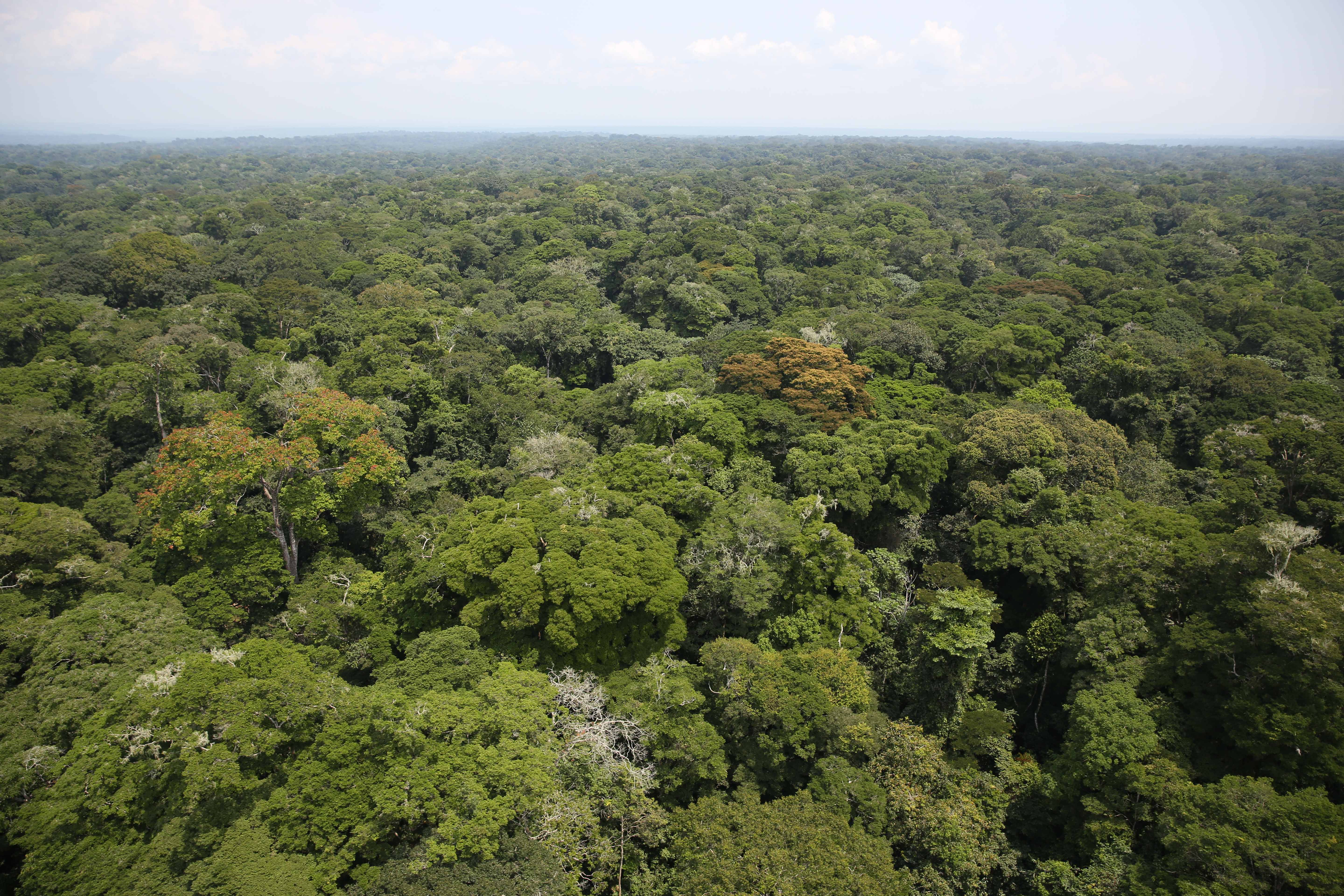
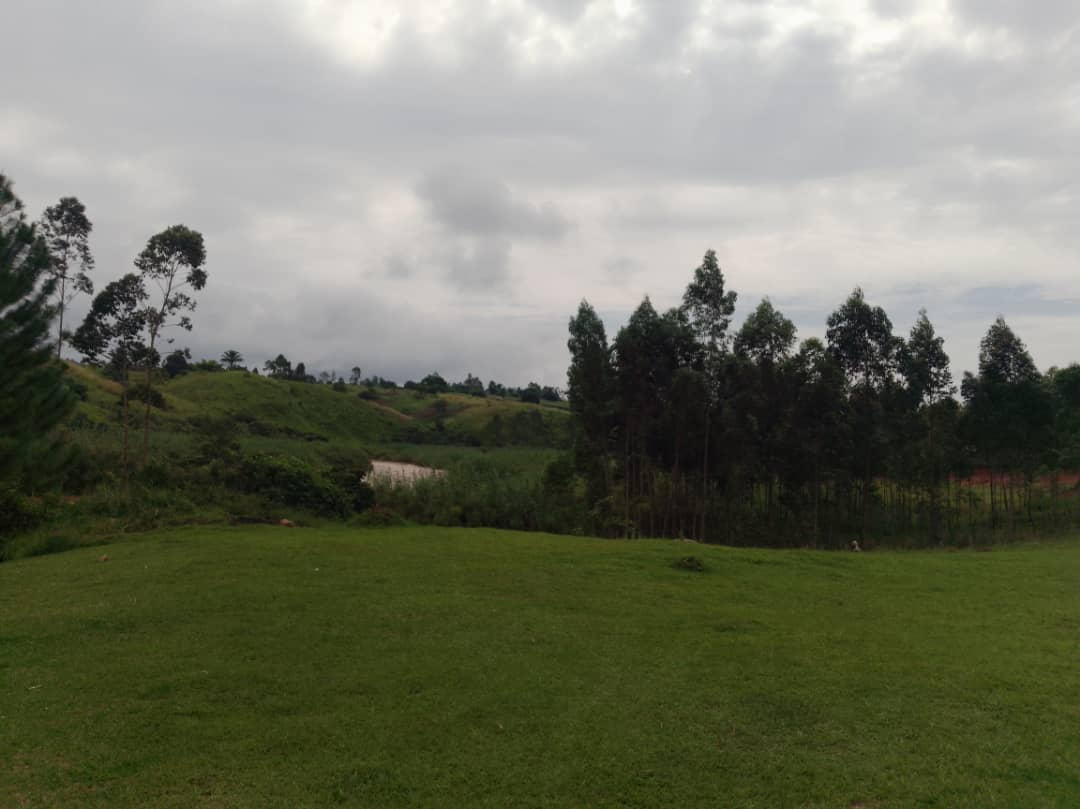
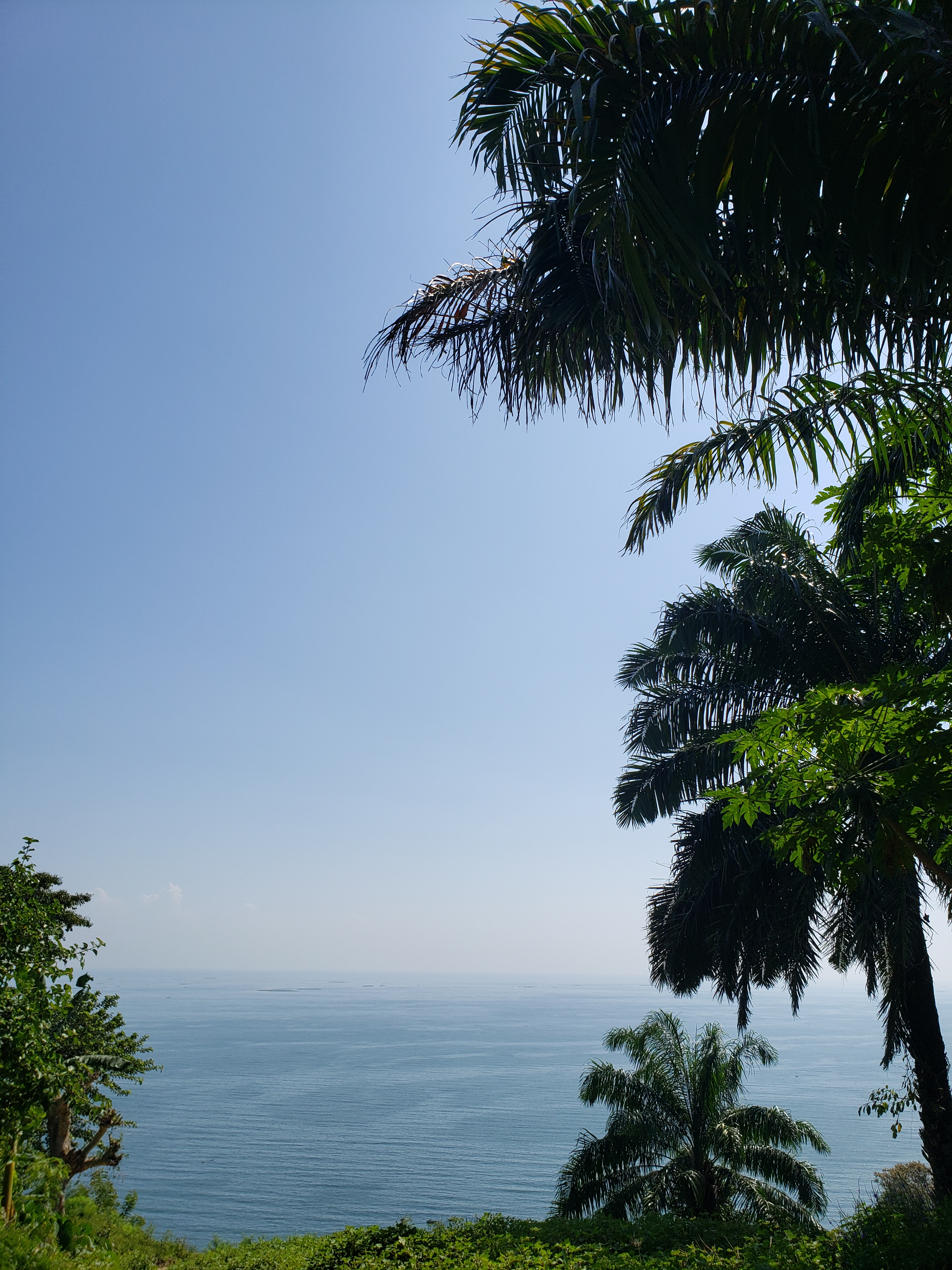
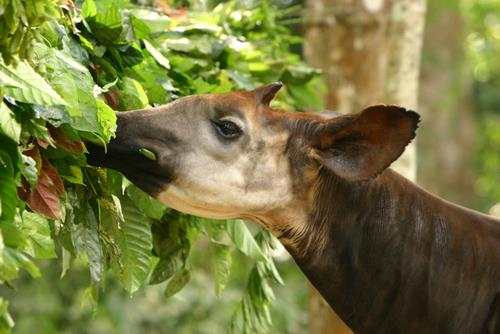
- From left to right: Ituri Rainforest, Green landscape at Bunia, Lake Albert, An Okapi native to the Ituri province in the Okapi Wildlife Reserve.

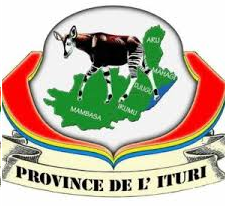
- Seal

- Coordinates: 1°50′N 29°30′E
- Country: DR Congo
- Established: 2015
- Named for: Ituri River
- Capital: Bunia

Government
  - Governor: Johnny Luboya Nkashama (military)

Area
  - Total: 65,658 km^{2} (25,351 sq mi)
  - Rank: 16th

Population (2020)
  - Total: 4,392,200
  - Rank: 7th
  - Density: 66.895/km^{2} (173.26/sq mi)

Ethnic groups
  - Native: Kakwa • Lugbara • Alur • Batwa • Bambuti • Lendu • Babira • Abatooro • Babali • Banyali • Bandaka • Okebu • Babudu • Logo • Mamvu • Bahema • Bakaiku • Imbo
  - Settler: Congolese Banyarwanda
- Time zone: UTC+2 (CAT)
- License Plate Code: (Democratic Republic of the Congo) CGO / 07
- Official language: French
- National language: Swahili
- Website: provinceituri.co archive

Ituri Province (French: Province de l'Ituri; Swahili: Mkoa wa Ituri) is one of the 26 provinces of the Democratic Republic of the Congo created in the 2015 repartitioning. Ituri, Bas-Uele, Haut-Uele, and Tshopo provinces are the result of the subdividing of the former Orientale province. Ituri was formed from the Ituri district, whose town of Bunia was elevated to capital city of the new province.

== Geography ==
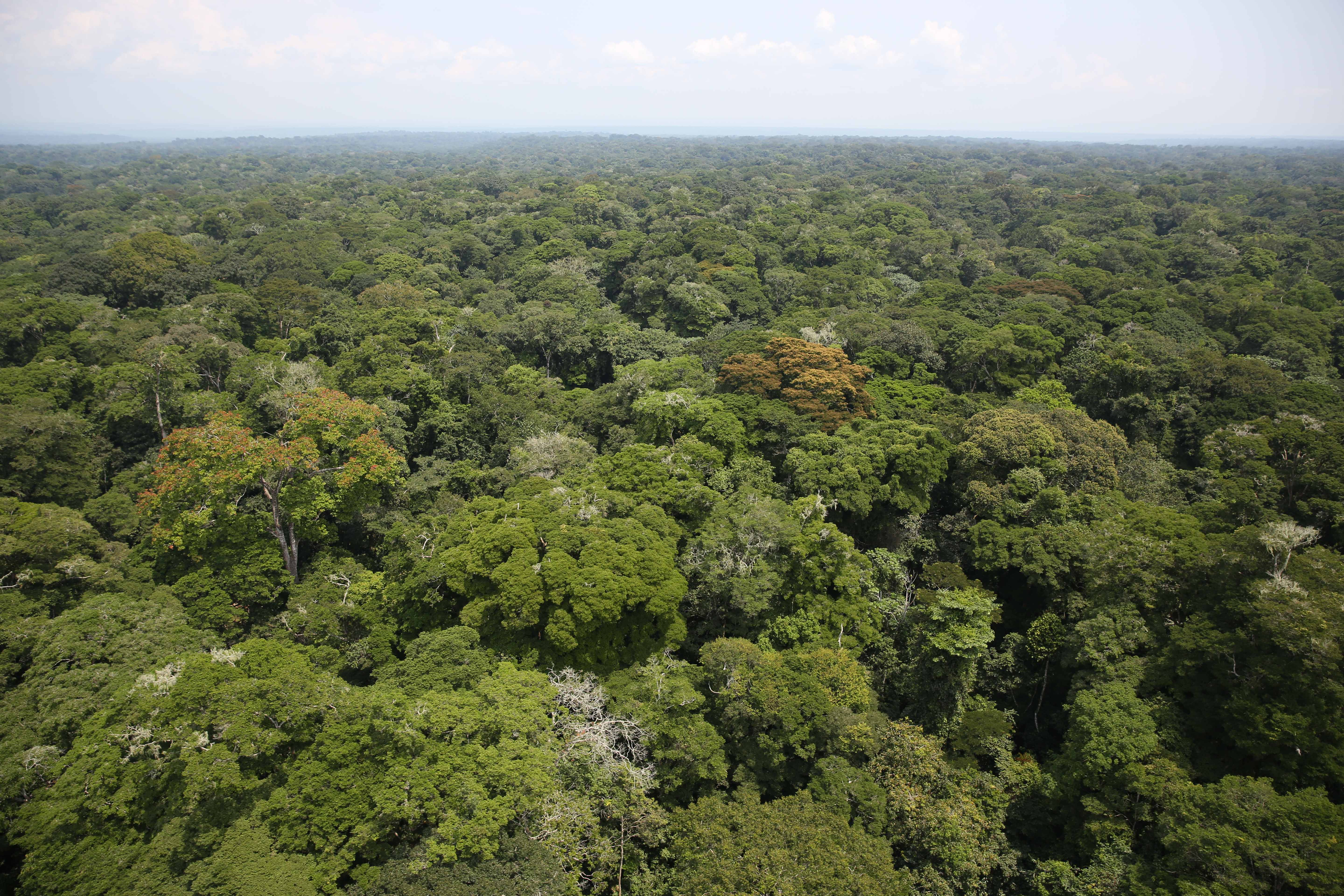
Ituri Rainforest

Ituri is a region of high plateau (2,000–5,000 meters) that has a large tropical forest but also the landscape of savannah. The province has rare fauna, including the okapi, the national animal of the Congo. As for flora, an important species is Mongongo, whose leaves are used by the Mbuti to build their homes.

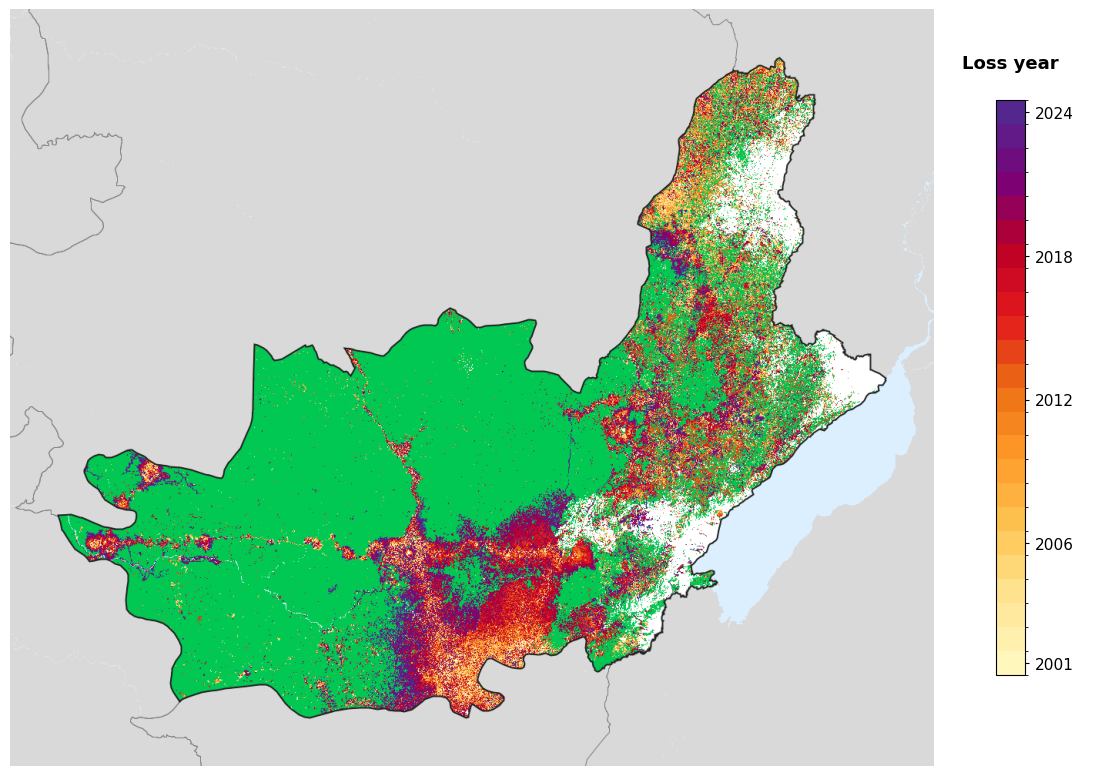
A map of tree-cover loss in Ituri, 2001-2024, from the Global Forest Change dataset.

The Ituri Rainforest is in this area, and is located northeast of the Ituri River and on the western side of Lake Albert. It has borders with Uganda and South Sudan.

== Administration ==
Ituri is divided in to five territories and one independently administered city.

Administrative division	Type	Map
Bunia	City	Bunia
Aru	Territory	Aru
Djugu	Territory	Djugu
Irumu	Territory	Irumu
Mahagi	Territory	Mahagi
Mambasa	Territory	Mambasa

== History ==
=== Legal status in dispute (1998–2006) ===
Prior to the adoption of the 2006 Constitution of the Democratic Republic of the Congo, the legal status of Ituri was a topic of some dispute. From the beginning of the Second Congo War in 1998, it was held by soldiers of the Uganda People's Defense Force (UPDF) and the Ugandan-backed Movement for Liberation faction of the Rally for Congolese Democracy (RCD-ML). In June 1999, the commander of UPDF forces in the DRC, Brig. Gen. James Kazini, ignored the protests of RCD-ML leaders and re-created the province of Kibali-Ituri out of the eastern section of the northeastern Orientale province.

The province is almost always referred to simply as Ituri. The creation of the new province under the political rivalry contributed to the start of the current Ituri conflict, which has caused thousands of deaths. Most official cartographers did not include the new province, and those referring to it as a "province" rather than a "region" were sometimes viewed as having a pro-Uganda bias. With the new constitution, Ituri's status as a province was finally settled.

=== Creation as a province (2015) ===
In 2015, the Orientale Province was divided into 4 new provinces, one of which was Ituri.

=== Ebola outbreak (2026–present) ===
The earliest known case of ebola in Ituri in the 2026 epidemic was a 59-year old man. He became symptomatic on 24 April 2026 and died three days later on 27 April. As of 15 May 2026, the epidemic had reached 3 health zones, Bunia, Mongbwalu, and Rwampara. As of 26 May 2026, the ebola epidemic reached 4 more health zones, Aru, Kilo, Nizi, and Nyankunde.

== Government ==
In 2003, an Ituri Interim Administration was formed through the efforts of the Ituri Pacification Commission, a commission sponsored by the United Nations Organization Mission in Democratic Republic of the Congo (MONUC, abbreviation of the French name "Mission de l'Organisation des Nations Unies en République Démocratique du Congo") that was set up, after much initial delay, after the pull-out of Ugandan troops from the district. It led to the creation of the Ituri Interim Assembly, which elected an administrator and an assembly chairperson. Petronille Vaweka, served as chairperson, and was also the sole deputy for the district to the National Assembly in Kinshasa.

The Interim Assembly was dissolved two years after its establishment.

=== Leaders ===
==== Governor of Kibali-Ituri from 1962-1966 ====
- Sep 1962 - 28 Dec 1966 Jean Foster Manzikala

==== Governors of Kibali-Ituri since 1999 ====
- *1999* Adele Lotsoye Mugisa (appointed by James Kazini)
- December 1999 - early 2001 Ernest Uringi Padolo
- Dec. 2001 - November 2002 Joseph Eneku
- Feb. 2002 - ???? Jean-Pierre Mulondo Lonpondo

==== Administrator of the Ituri Interim Administration ====
- April 2003 – 2015 Emmanuel Leku Apuobo

==== Governors of Ituri (from 2015) ====
- April 2015 – 2016: Emmanuel Leku Apuobo

== Economy ==
Coffee and cocoa beans are major agricultural exports from Ituri. The cultivation of cocoa beans is growing in popularity among farmers.

The Kilo-Moto gold mines are partly located in Ituri. In the beginning of the 21st century, petroleum reserves were found by Heritage Oil and Tullow Oil on the shores of Lake Albert.

== Demographics ==
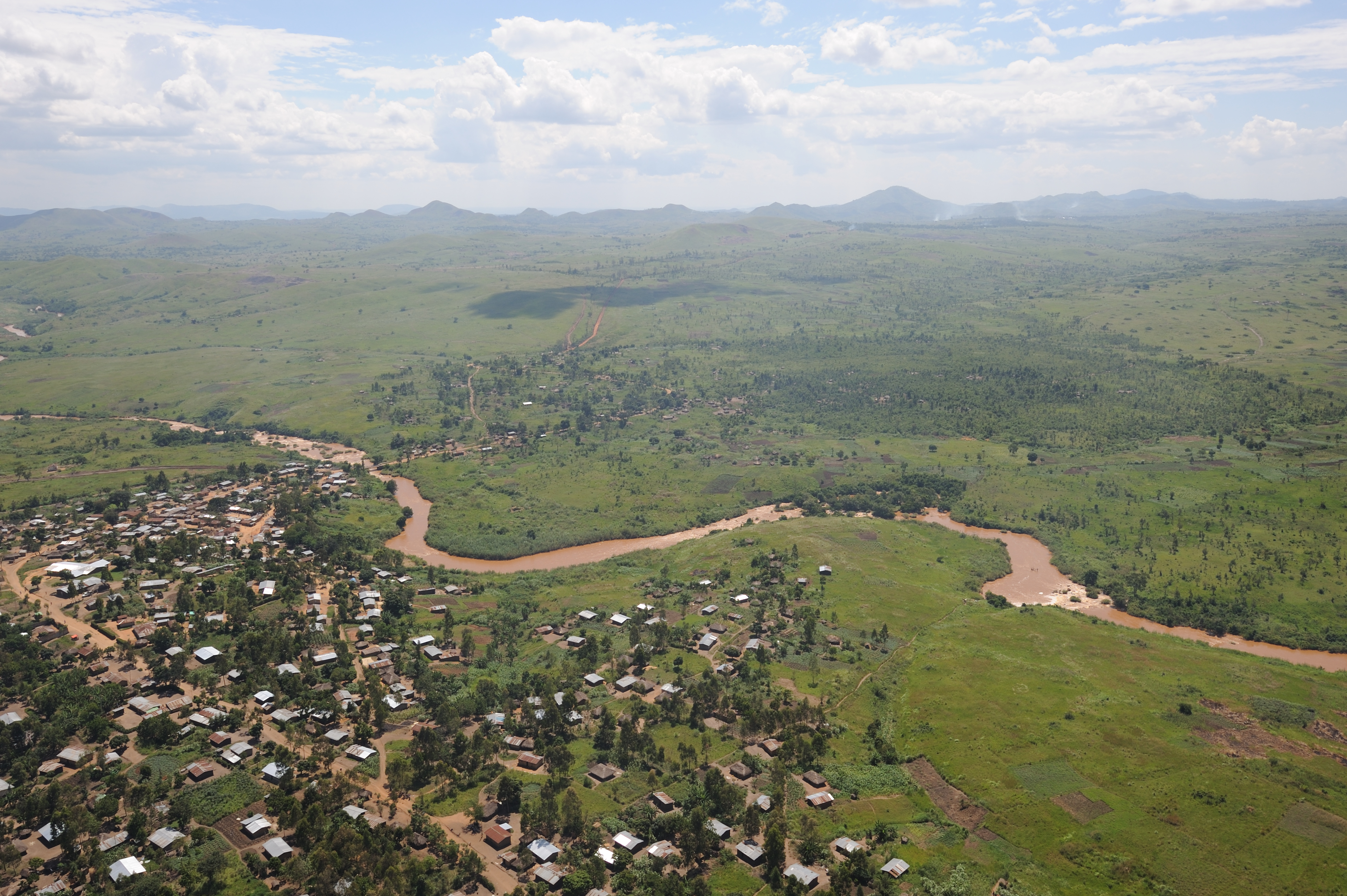
Bunia from the air

The 2020 population was estimated to be 4,392,200.

=== Ethnic groups ===
The population is composed primarily of Alur, Hema, Lendu, Ngiti, Bira and Ndo-Okebo. Figures differ on which one of the groups constitutes the largest percentage of the population in the province. The Mbuti, a pygmy ethnic group, primarily live in the Ituri forest near the Okapi Wildlife Reserve. Some Mbuti have been forced into urban areas by deforestation, over-hunting and violence.

== See also ==
- Effacer le tableau
