= Genocide Prevention Task Force =

On 8 December 2008, the Genocide Prevention Task Force, co-chaired by Madeleine Albright, a former US Secretary of State, and William Cohen, a former US Secretary of Defense, released its final report which concludes that the US government can prevent genocide and mass atrocities in the future.

In the words of Cohen, "This report provides a blueprint that can enable the United States to take preventive action, along with international partners, to forestall the specter of future cases of genocide and mass atrocities."

Recommendations include:

- a proactive role of the US president which would demonstrate to the US and the world that preventing genocide and mass atrocities is a national priority
- creating a body within the United States National Security Council to analyze threats and consider preventive action
- set up a fund of $250 million for crisis prevention and response
- help create an international network for the sharing of information and the coordination of preventive action
