= Bunia =

- Provincial capital and city
- Ville de Bunia
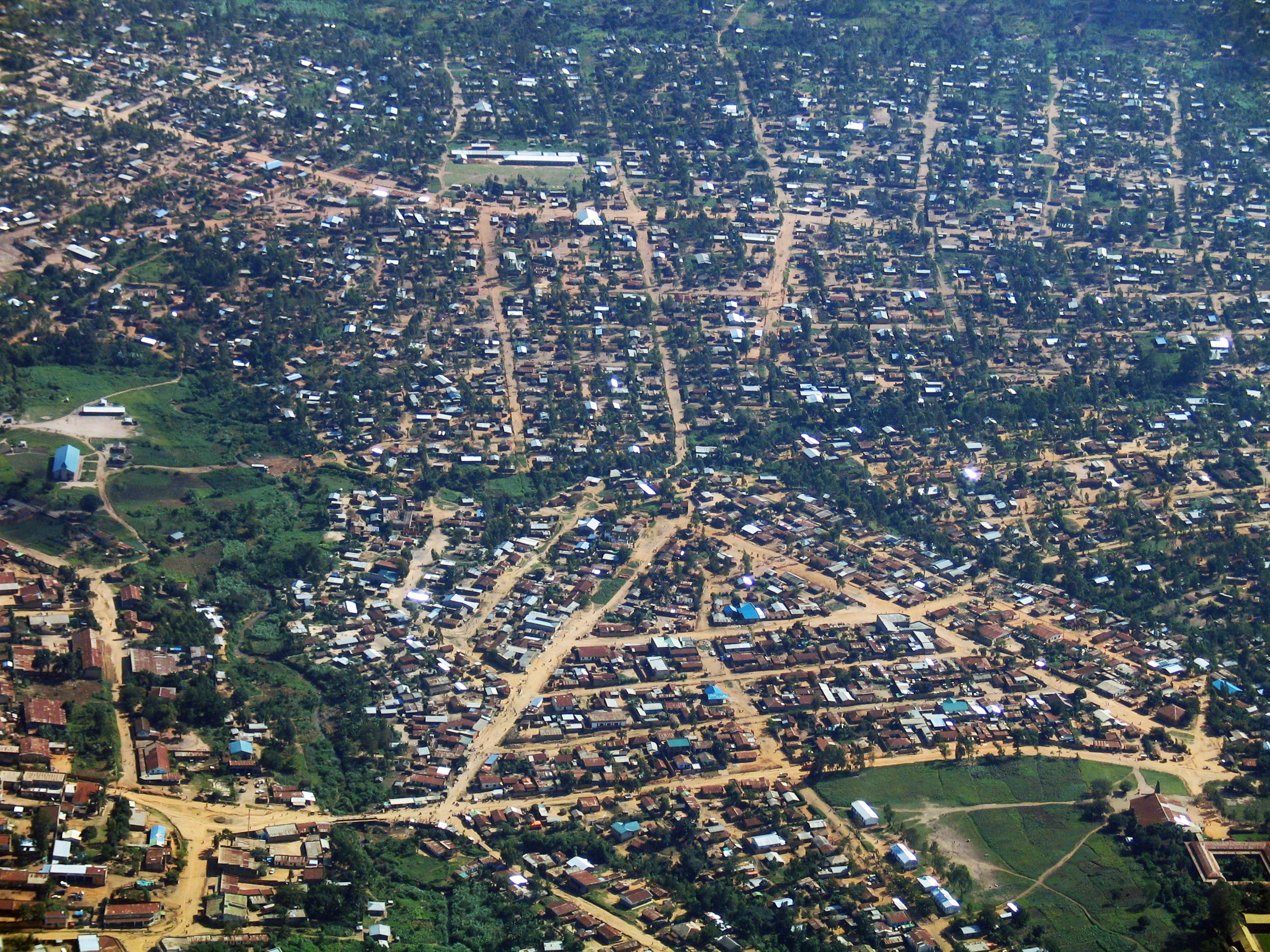
- Bunia from the air, looking north toward the Nyakasanza district

- Location in Democratic Republic of the Congo
- Coordinates: 1°34′N 30°15′E
- Country: Democratic Republic of the Congo
- Province: Ituri

Government
  - Mayor: Ferdinand Fimbo Lebilye

Area
  - City: 576 km^{2} (222 sq mi)
  - Urban: 53 km^{2} (20 sq mi)
- Elevation: 1,277 m (4,190 ft)

Population (2015)
  - City: 900,666
  - Density: 1,560/km^{2} (4,050/sq mi)
  - Urban: 486,000
  - Urban density: 9,200/km^{2} (24,000/sq mi)
- Time zone: UTC+2 (Central Africa Time)
- Climate: Af
- National language: Swahili

Bunia is the capital city of Ituri Province in the Democratic Republic of the Congo (DRC). It was part of the Orientale Province until that province's dissolution.

It lies at an elevation of 1,275 metres or 4,180 feet on a plateau about 30 kilometres or 19 miles west of Lake Albert in the Albertine Rift, and about 25 kilometres or 16 miles east of the Ituri Rainforest.

The city is at the center of the Ituri conflict between the Lendu and Hema. In the Second Congo War the city and district were the scene of much fighting and many civilian deaths from this conflict, and related clashes between militias and Uganda-based forces. Consequently, the city is the base of one of the largest United Nations peace-keeping forces in Africa, and its headquarters in northeastern DRC. The area's natural resources include gold mines over which militias and foreign forces have been fighting.

== Climate ==
Bunia has a tropical rainforest climate (Köppen Af) with warm, humid and wet conditions prevailing year-round. Although rainfall is reduced substantially between December and February, those months still average over 130 millimetres or 5 inches of rain. For the rest of the year, rainfall is very heavy with over 230 millimetres or 9.1 inches for nine months of the year.

Climate data for Bunia
Month	Jan	Feb	Mar	Apr	May	Jun	Jul	Aug	Sep	Oct	Nov	Dec	Year
Mean daily maximum °C (°F)	29.4 (84.9)	28.9 (84.0)	28.9 (84.0)	28.3 (82.9)	27.2 (81.0)	26.1 (79.0)	25.6 (78.1)	26.1 (79.0)	27.2 (81.0)	27.2 (81.0)	27.2 (81.0)	28.3 (82.9)	27.5 (81.5)
Daily mean °C (°F)	22.8 (73.0)	22.8 (73.0)	22.8 (73.0)	22.8 (73.0)	22.2 (72.0)	20.8 (69.4)	20.6 (69.1)	20.6 (69.1)	21.1 (70.0)	21.4 (70.5)	21.1 (70.0)	22.0 (71.6)	21.8 (71.2)
Mean daily minimum °C (°F)	16.1 (61.0)	16.7 (62.1)	16.7 (62.1)	17.2 (63.0)	17.2 (63.0)	15.6 (60.1)	15.6 (60.1)	15.0 (59.0)	15.0 (59.0)	15.6 (60.1)	15.0 (59.0)	15.6 (60.1)	15.9 (60.6)
Average rainfall mm (inches)	139.7 (5.50)	172.7 (6.80)	238.8 (9.40)	269.3 (10.60)	317.5 (12.50)	266.7 (10.50)	309.9 (12.20)	393.7 (15.50)	243.8 (9.60)	274.3 (10.80)	304.8 (12.00)	165.1 (6.50)	3,096.3 (121.9)

== Transport ==
The main dirt highways connecting north-eastern DR Congo with Kisangani to the west and Butembo and Goma to the south pass through Bunia, but have fallen into disrepair and are virtually impassable, especially after the frequent rains.

Bunia is only 40 kilometres or 25 miles from the Ugandan border running down Lake Albert, but there are no road connections across the Great Rift Valley to the closest Ugandan towns of Toro and Fort Portal. Instead a dirt highway going north-east reaches Arua and Gulu north of the lake. Before the war made the route impassable, this was the chief trade route between the DRC and Uganda, as well between the DRC and Juba in South Sudan, and Bunia was an important market city, for cross-border trade as well as internal trade.

The supposed route of the Lagos-Mombasa Highway passes just to the south of Bunia, emphasising its potential as a centre of trade, but that transnational highway does not exist as a viable route through the DRC.

Bunia is linked to the small port of Kasenyi on Lake Albert by a 60 kilometres (37 mi) dirt track via Bogoro, which has a spectacular and dangerous 600-metre descent of the western escarpment of the Great Rift Valley. Kasenyi has a 155 metres (509 ft) jetty from which boat transport can link with Mahagi-Port at the north end of the lake, and with Butiaba and Ntoroko on the Eastern Lake Albert Shore (Ugandan side) and Pakwach on the Albert Nile.

Given the poor state of the roads, and the total lack of railway transport, Bunia Airport is of prime importance.

== Demographics ==
Projected to be the eighth fastest growing city on the African continent between 2020 and 2025, with a 5.63% growth.

== Other features ==
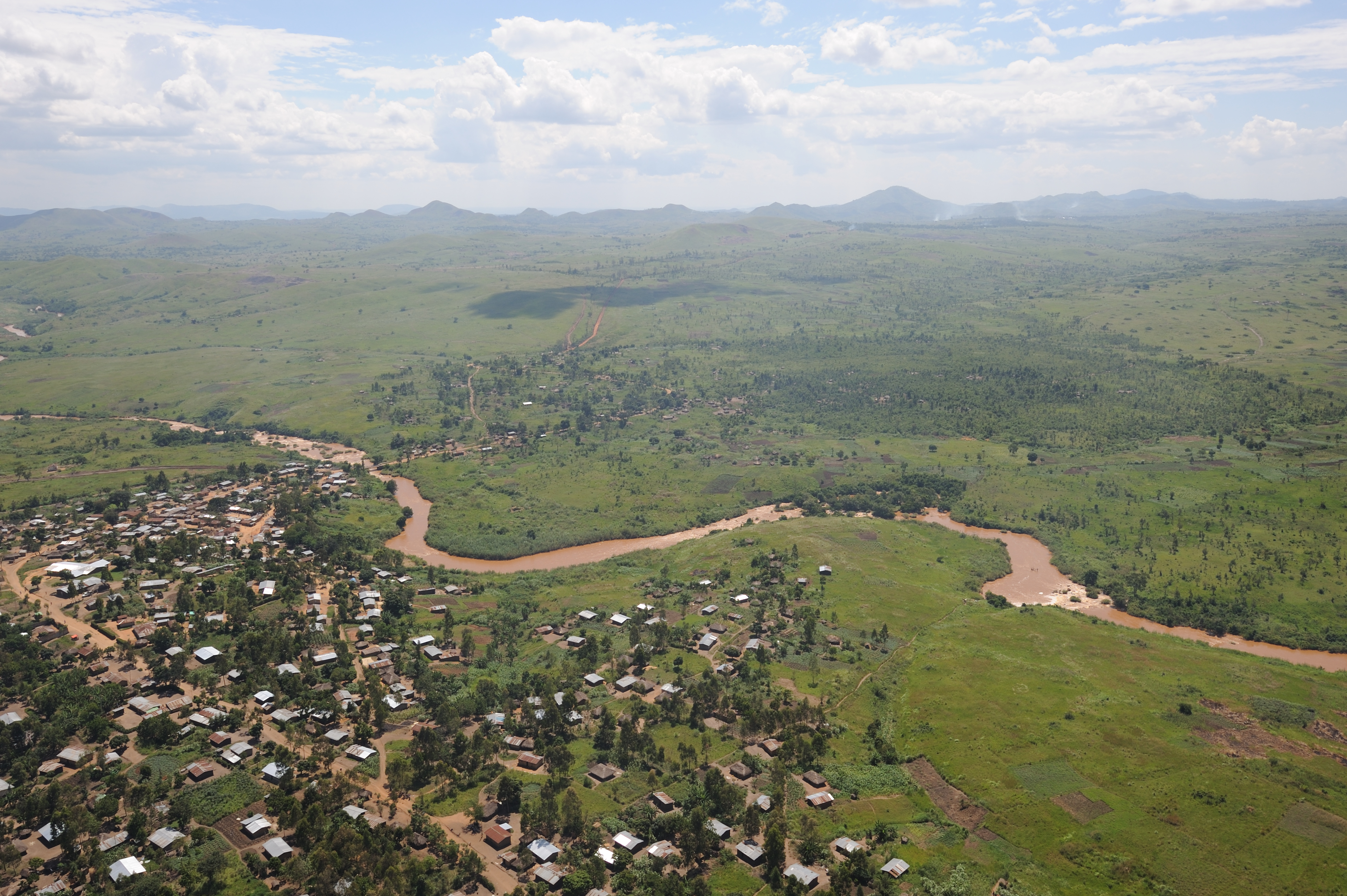
Bunia from the air.

Mount Hoyo is 35 kilometres or 22 miles south-west of Bunia. The Shari River flows along the northwestern outskirts of the city. The Ituri River flows around 35 km west of Bunia. The confluence of the Shari and Ituri is about 45 kilometres or 28 miles south-southwest of Bunia.

Although Bunia is about 170 kilometres or 110 miles north of the Equator, the city was featured in the BBC television travel documentary Equator made in 2006, since it was one of the few places near the Equator in eastern DRC where the safety of the TV crew could be assured, by the presence of the large UN peace-keeping force.

== Higher education ==
Bunia has a number of universities, the largest being the University of Bunia (UNIBU).
