= Bristol Zoo Project =

Wildlife conservation park in South Gloucestershire, England

- Interactive map of Bristol Zoo Project
- 51.5305°N 2.6122°W
- Date opened: 22 July 2013
- Location: Zoo Project, Blackhorse Hill, Bristol, BS10 7TP
- Land area: 136 Acres
- Annual visitors: 192,306 (2018)
- Owner: Bristol Zoological Society
- Website: bristolzoo.org.uk

Bristol Zoo Project, formerly known as the Wild Place Project, is a wildlife conservation park in South Gloucestershire, United Kingdom. It is run by Bristol Zoological Society (BZS) and was the sister site of Bristol Zoo Gardens until closure of that site in 2022. In summer 2023, Wild Place Project rebranded as "Bristol Zoo Project" following the transition of Bristol Zoo Gardens from their Clifton site.

The park has been designed to link specific ecosystems and conservation programmes around the world, and was originally intended to be split into biomes, representing species found only in specific habitats. Current areas include: Bear Wood, Benoué National Park and Discover Madagascar.

== History ==
Bristol Zoo Project is located on Hollywood Estate. The estate was gifted to Bristol Zoological Society in the mid 1960s by the White family. From the 1960s to 2013 the site was used as an off show area for breeding and quarantine. The site also housed the society's nurseries and to this day grows a third of the food for the animals at Bristol Zoo Project.

In 2008 Bristol Zoological Society announced plans to submit plans to South Gloucestershire Council for the development of a new 135 acre (55 hectare) park.

The park officially opened on 22 July 2013. The original submitted plans suggested a development cost of circa £70 million.

Bear Wood, an environment designed to mimic England in 8,000 BC opened in July 2019.

== Animals ==
Bristol Zoo Project is home to 25 species of animals, including 19 mammals and 6 birds.

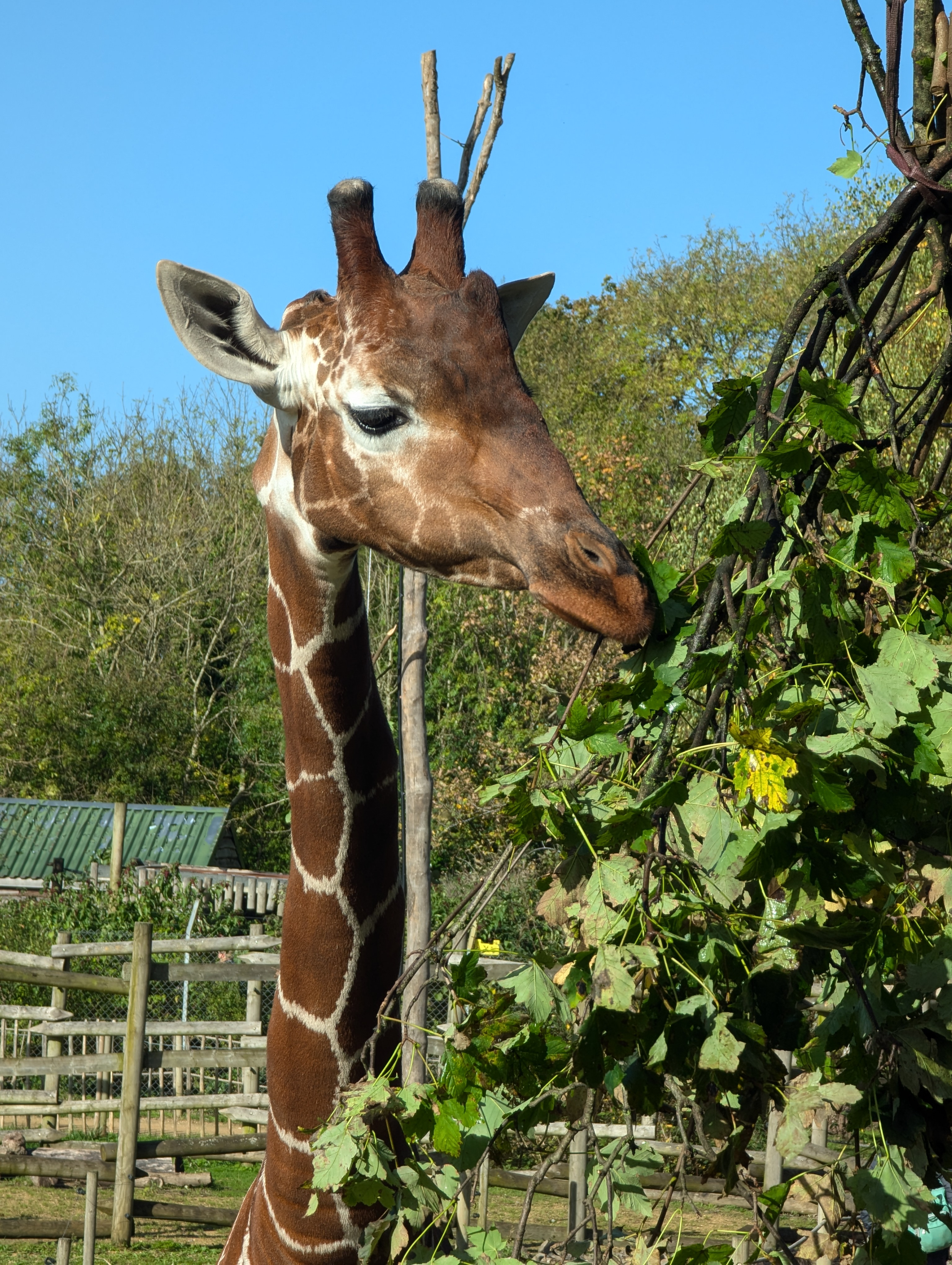
Giraffe at Bristol Zoo Project in 2024

Mammals:

- Addax (brothers Phoenix and Nico)
- Alaotran gentle lemur
- Black-and-white ruffed lemur
- Blue-eyed black lemur
- Eurasian lynx (Zone and Loka)
- Eurasian wolf (brothers Forty, Socks, Loki and Faolin)
- European brown bears (brothers Neo and Nilas and brother and sister Albie and Gemini)
- Gelada (a troop of 6, including family group Kito, Kidame, Harshit and Hobbit with father and son Leena and Takeze)
- Grant's zebra (Peter and Florence)
- Meerkat (a mob of 5 males)
- Mongoose lemur
- Philippine spotted deer (Eugene and Pandora)
- Pygmy goat (Toby and Joe)
- Red panda (Nilo)
- Red river hog (Ekundu and Laña)
- Reticulated giraffe (Tom, Tico and Dayo)
- Ring-tailed lemur
- Southeast African cheetah (brothers Jake and Oscar)
- Western Lowland Gorilla
- Wolverine (Alice and her triplets, Scottie, Ingrid and Otto)

Birds:

- European turtle dove
- Mauritian pink pigeon
- Mindanao bleeding-heart dove
- Ostrich (Mary and Drummer)
- Village weaver
- Visayan tarictic hornbill

== Plans for 2022 to 2024 ==
Bristol Zoological Society announced on 27 November 2020 that its historic Bristol Zoo Gardens site in Clifton would close, with the animals moved to the Wild Place Project site close to the M5 motorway.

- The western lowland gorillas, collared mangabeys, African grey parrots, slender-snouted crocodiles, okapis and mandrills will be in a new central African rainforest area.
- The eastern black rhinoceroses and ostriches would join the giraffes, zebra, elands, Red river hogs and cheetahs in the Benoue National Park area.

The new conservation breeding centre would include Annam leaf turtles, Lesser Antillean iguanas, Pancake tortoises, Radiated tortoises, Roti Island snake-necked turtles, Indochinese box turtles, Lemur leaf frogs, Mountain chicken frogs, Marshall's pygmy chameleons, Turquoise dwarf geckos, Blue-spotted tree monitors, Leaf-tail geckos, Deserta Grande wolf spiders, Polynesian tree snails, Lord Howe Island stick insects, two species of Madeiran land snail (Discula lyelliana and Geomitra grabhami), Socorro doves, Visayan tarictic hornbills, Sumatran laughingthrushes, Philippine cockatoos, Javan green magpies, European turtle doves, Mindanao bleeding-hearts, Negros bleeding-heart pigeons, pink pigeons, Malagasy cichlids, Malagasy rainbow fish and powder blue panchax, Pupfish and goodeids and White clawed crayfish.

Finally, there was to be a new entrance with a new café, new gift shop, and new entry exhibits.

In 2021, it was announced that new features at Bristol Zoo Project resulting from the move from Clifton were to include a conservation breeding centre with climate-controlled enclosures, a learning centre and a conservation medicine centre.
