= Bristol Zoo =

Zoo in Bristol, United Kingdom

Bristol Zoological Gardens

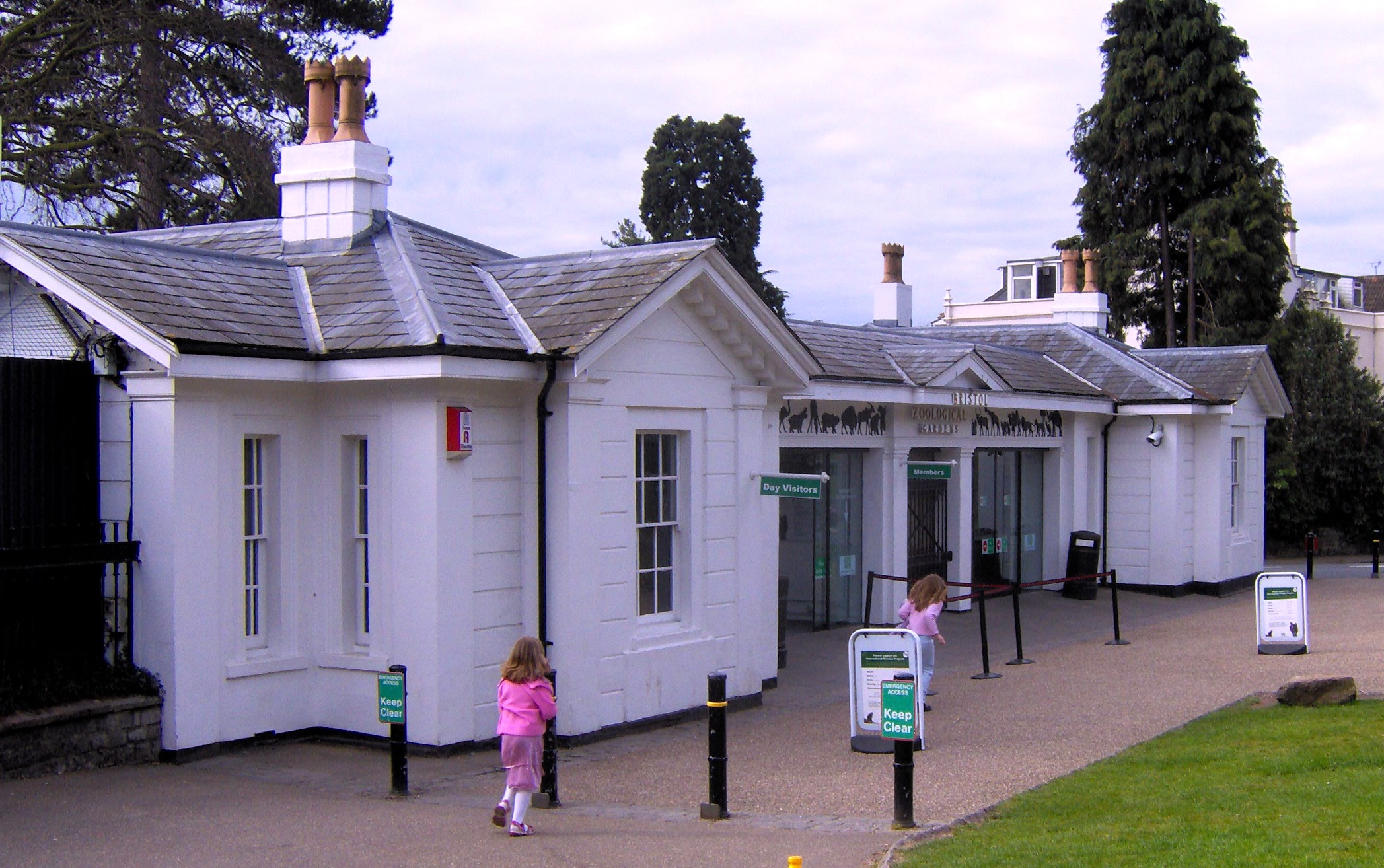
- Main entrance
- Interactive map of Bristol Zoological Gardens
- 51°27′48″N 2°37′20″W
- Date opened: 1836
- Date closed: 3 September 2022
- Location: Clifton, Bristol, England
- Land area: 12 acres (4.9 ha)
- No. of animals: 7155 (2007)
- No. of species: 419 (2007)
- Annual visitors: 478,126 (2018)
- Memberships: The Bristol, Clifton and West of England Zoological Society
- Major exhibits: Zona Brazil, Seal and Penguin Coasts, Gorilla Island
- Website: www.bristolzoo.org.uk

Bristol Zoo Gardens was a zoo in the city of Bristol in South West England. Bristol Zoo Gardens was managed by the education and conservation charity Bristol Zoological Society, which also manages Bristol Zoo Project (formerly Wild Place Project). The zoo's stated mission from 2008 to 2018 was to "maintain and defend" biodiversity through breeding endangered species, conserving threatened species and habitats and promoting a wider understanding of the natural world". Bristol Zoological Society's current mission is "Saving Wildlife Together".

The mammal collection at Bristol Zoo Gardens numbered around 300, representing 50 species, including: gorillas, Asiatic lions, goodfellow's tree-kangaroo, and red pandas. Among species on view at Bristol Zoo Gardens which are rare or absent in other UK zoos were Livingstone's fruit bats, aye ayes and quolls.

The zoo's Twilight Zone was the first of its kind when it opened, there were many other indoor exhibits including an insect and reptile house and aquarium meanwhile outside there were several aviaries and a seal and penguin enclosure. The lakes' islands were home to gorillas, golden lion tamarins, golden-headed lion tamarins, gibbons and squirrel monkeys.

The Zoo announced on 27 November 2020 that after more than 186 years its main centre in Clifton would close in 2022, with some animals moving to its Wild Place Project site close to the M5 motorway and a new conservation zoo being developed there. It closed its gates for the last time on 3 September 2022. The site is being redeveloped for housing. It was listed as an asset of community value in 2021.

== Animal exhibits ==
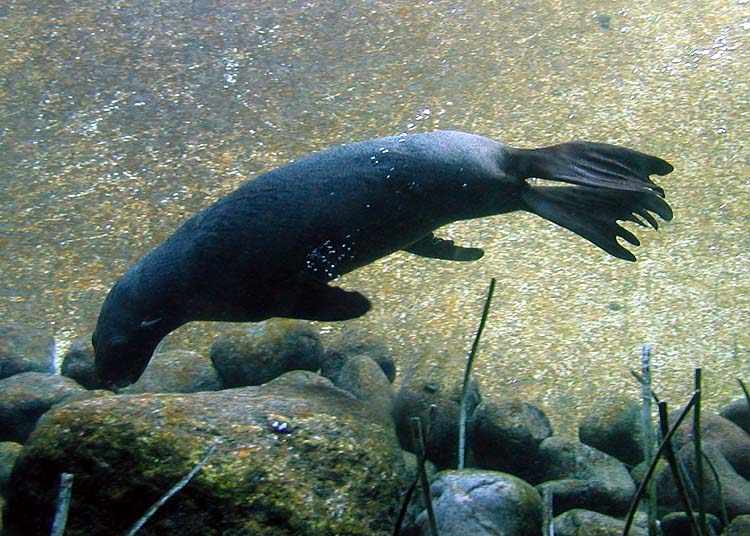
South American fur seal seen through the observation windows at Seal and Penguin Coasts, Bristol Zoo.

- Seal and Penguin Coasts was a major attraction at the zoo; opened in 1999, it allowed South American fur seals and African penguins to be watched both above and below the water. The most notable of these African Penguins being CGP Grey the penguin named after internet personality CGP Grey, CGP Grey the penguin died in 2017 (No exact date was given but was first reported on 13 May 2017). The two pools contained 145,000 imperial gallons (660,000 L) of salt water, with waves, waterfalls, rocks and pebble beaches to simulate the natural habitat. The exhibit had a large net over the top to allow Inca terns and common eiders to be kept in the same enclosure.
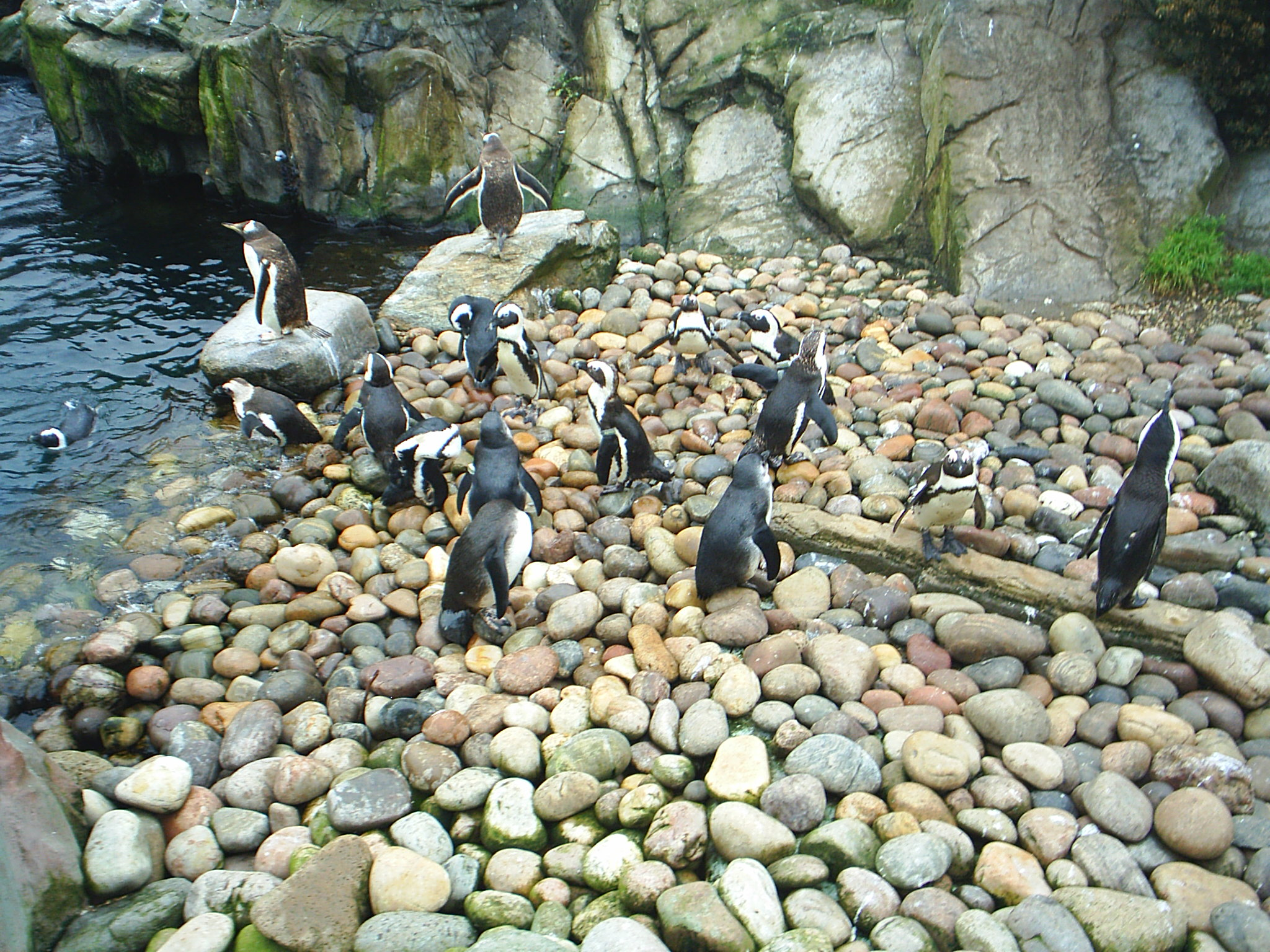
  Penguins at Bristol Zoo
- Gorilla Island was home to a family of western lowland gorillas. One silverback, Jock as well as Kera, Kala and Touni. In February 2016, Kera's first baby Afia was born after an emergency caesarean section. In April 2017, Touni gave birth to baby Ayana. In August 2020, Kala gave birth to a baby Hasani. Also in December 2020, Touni gave birth to her second baby called Juni. As well as an indoor house, they had a large island. Despite the gorilla's herbivorous diet, keepers did not enter the same space as the apes. This is because not only is there a great risk of injury with these powerful primates, but they also wanted to let the gorillas socialize on their own without human interference.
- The Top Terrace was one of the oldest parts of the zoo. It was home to a pair of Asiatic lions, keas, red pandas, Livingstone's fruit bats, and Greater Flamingos.
- The Reptile House housed a collection of reptiles and amphibians. The house itself was heated and gave a sense of the heat of the rainforest. There were three sections to the house: Desert (Gila monsters, geckos and tortoises), Rainforest (dwarf crocodiles, terrapins and snakes) and the Rearing Room where visitors could view the raising of reptiles and amphibian and also learn about the zoo's conservation work. Outside, but still considered part of the reptile house, was a giant tortoise and rhinoceros iguana enclosure where the animals had access to a heated indoor house and an outdoor enclosure.
- The Aquarium had around 70 species of fish. The aquarium had three sections: The Amazon River (catfish, pacu and piranha), Africa (cichlids) and the coral reef (seahorses, corals and various species of fish). On the outside of the building there was a water sculpture. There were several exhibits of conservation significance on view. Notably, there was a display of endangered cichlids from Lake Barombi Mbo in Cameroon and a display of goodeids from Mexico and paddlefish and alligator gar from North America.
- Bug World, was the zoo's collection of invertebrates, includes species such as Partula snails, stick and leaf insects and corals. Other displays included tarantulas, giant millipedes, honey bees, leaf-cutting ants and Lord Howe Island stick insects. Bug World also housed the Critically Endangered Desertas Wolf Spider. Previous displays included peacock mantis shrimp and black widow spiders.
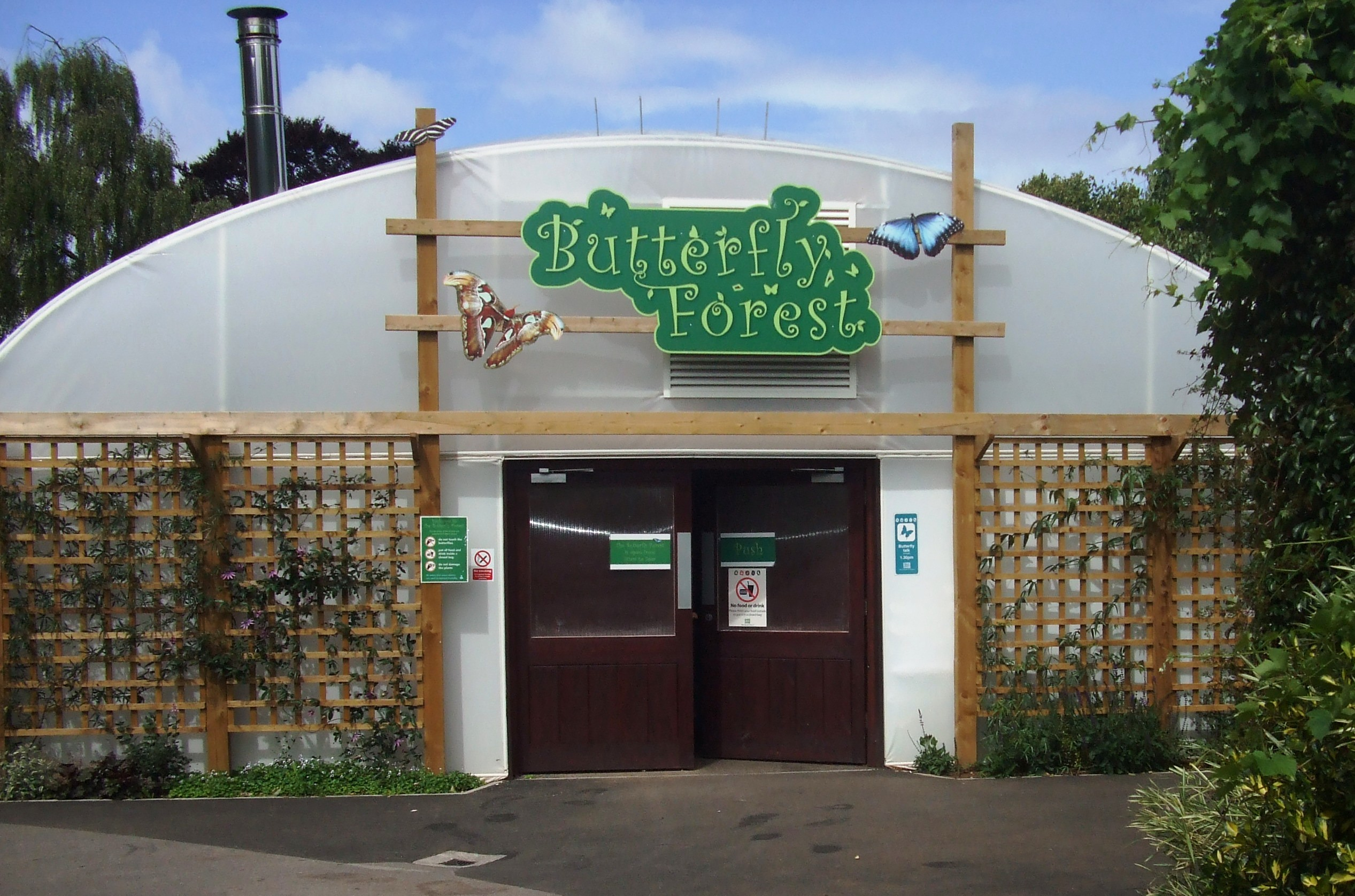
  Butterfly Forest
- Monkey Jungle opened in 2006 and featured four new exhibits replacing the old monkey house. An enclosure was home to crowned lemurs and ring-tailed lemurs where visitors could walk in with the lemurs without any boundaries. The other enclosures were home to brown spider monkeys and lion-tailed macaques. There was also a nearby enclosure for black howler monkeys and six-banded armadillos. The islands opposite Gorilla Island housed a family of squirrel monkeys, a pair of agile gibbons and also golden-headed lion tamarins.
- The Butterfly House was made up of an undercover walk-through in a sustainably-heated, climate-controlled polytunnel. . Species on show included the blue morpho butterflies, glasswings, leopard lacewings and atlas moths. The exhibit was linked to sustainable butterfly producers in Costa Rica. The zoo also supported work to protect the rare silky wave moth in Avon Gorge.

== History ==
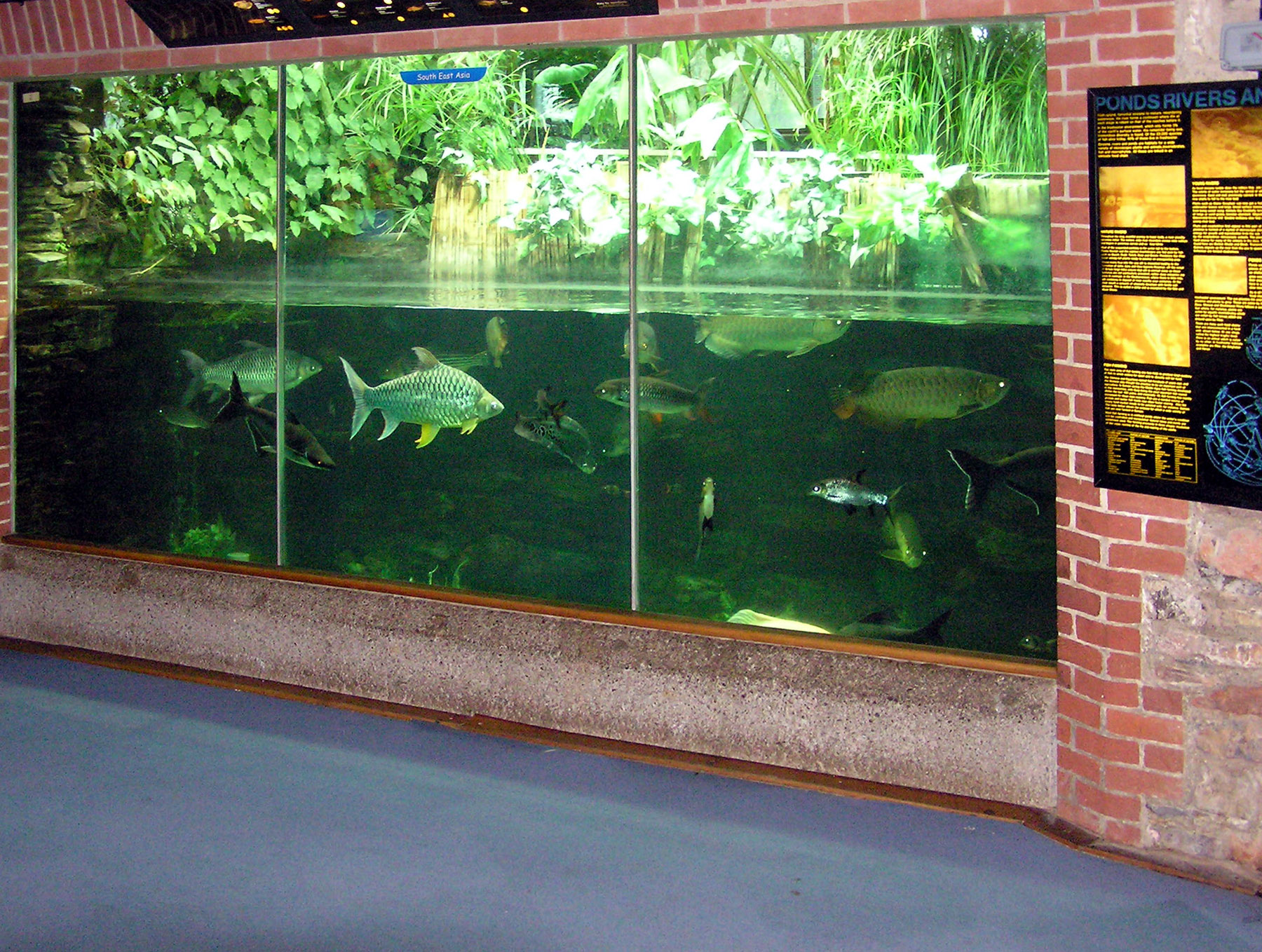
The Southeast Asia tank in the zoo aquarium.

Opened in 1836 by the Bristol, Clifton and West of England Zoological Society, Bristol Zoo was the world's oldest provincial zoo. It was a Victorian walled zoo located between Clifton Down and Clifton College, near Brunel's Clifton Suspension Bridge; it covered a small area by modern standards, but with a considerable number of species. In the 1960s the zoo came to national prominence by appearing in the UK television series, Animal Magic, hosted by the comic animal 'communicator', Johnny Morris. Morris would play keeper and voice all the animals there.

The zoo's official name was Bristol Zoological Gardens ('Bristol Zoo Gardens' for commercial purposes). This was not in recognition of the flower displays but recognises the first use of that title at the Regent's Park Zoological Gardens. Bristol, like its earlier London counterpart, included several original buildings which have been praised for their architectural quirks, despite being unsuitable for the care of animals; the (former) Giraffe House joined the main entrance lodge and the south gates on Guthrie Road as a Grade II listed building. The old Monkey Temple, resembling a southern Asian temple, was home to an exhibit called "Smarty plants", an interactive exhibit which shows how plants use and manipulate animals to survive.

The zoo also has breeding firsts, including the first black rhino born in Britain in 1958, the first squirrel monkey born in captivity in 1953 and the first chimpanzee born in Europe in 1934.

== Conservation ==
Bristol Zoological Society (BZS) supports wildlife conservation, education and breeding programmes worldwide. For example, Bristol worked with other zoos around the world to breed lemurs in captivity. Native to Madagascar, the lemurs are critically endangered because their forest habitat is being destroyed.

Similarly, BZS supports the UK–US charity Ape Action Africa, which rescues and rehabilitates primates in Cameroon, West Africa. Closer to home, the zoo helped to reintroduce the water vole and the white-clawed crayfish to parts of Southern England. They also had conservation projects for Kordofan giraffe, Agalychnis lemur, Negros bleeding-heart pigeon, Sanje Mangabey and Hogna ingens

In 2021, as part of the Bristol Zoological Society's focus on conservation, the zoo has been involved in the ongoing captive breeding program to rescue two species of critically endangered Madeiran land snail, (Discula lyelliana and Geomitra grabhami). Since the early 20th century, the snails were believed to be extinct, but remnant populations were rediscovered in 2013.

== Bristol Zoo Project ==
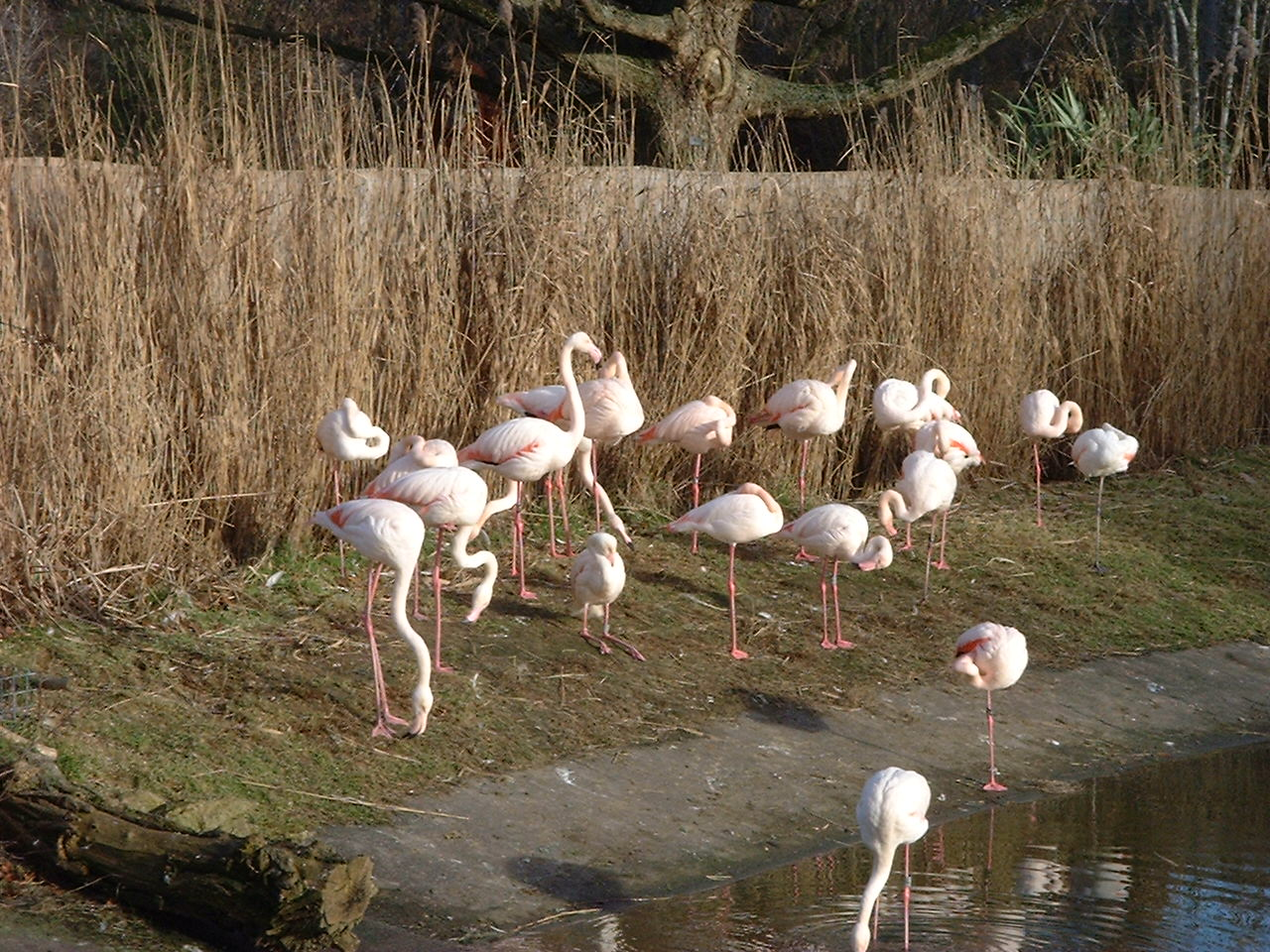
Greater flamingo (Phoenicopterus roseus) in the Bristol zoo

Bristol Zoo Project (formerly Wild Place Project) is designed to house larger animals than the former Bristol Zoo Gardens, in more naturalistic surroundings. The zoo is split into biomes, representing species found only in specific habitats. Current areas include: Bear Wood, Gelada Rocks, Discover Madagascar and Benoue National Park. The species list currently includes red river hog, cheetah, zebra, meerkat, gelada baboon, reticulated giraffe, wolverine, eurasian lynx, grey wolf, brown bear, Visayan spotted deer, Ostrich red panda and western lowland gorilla.

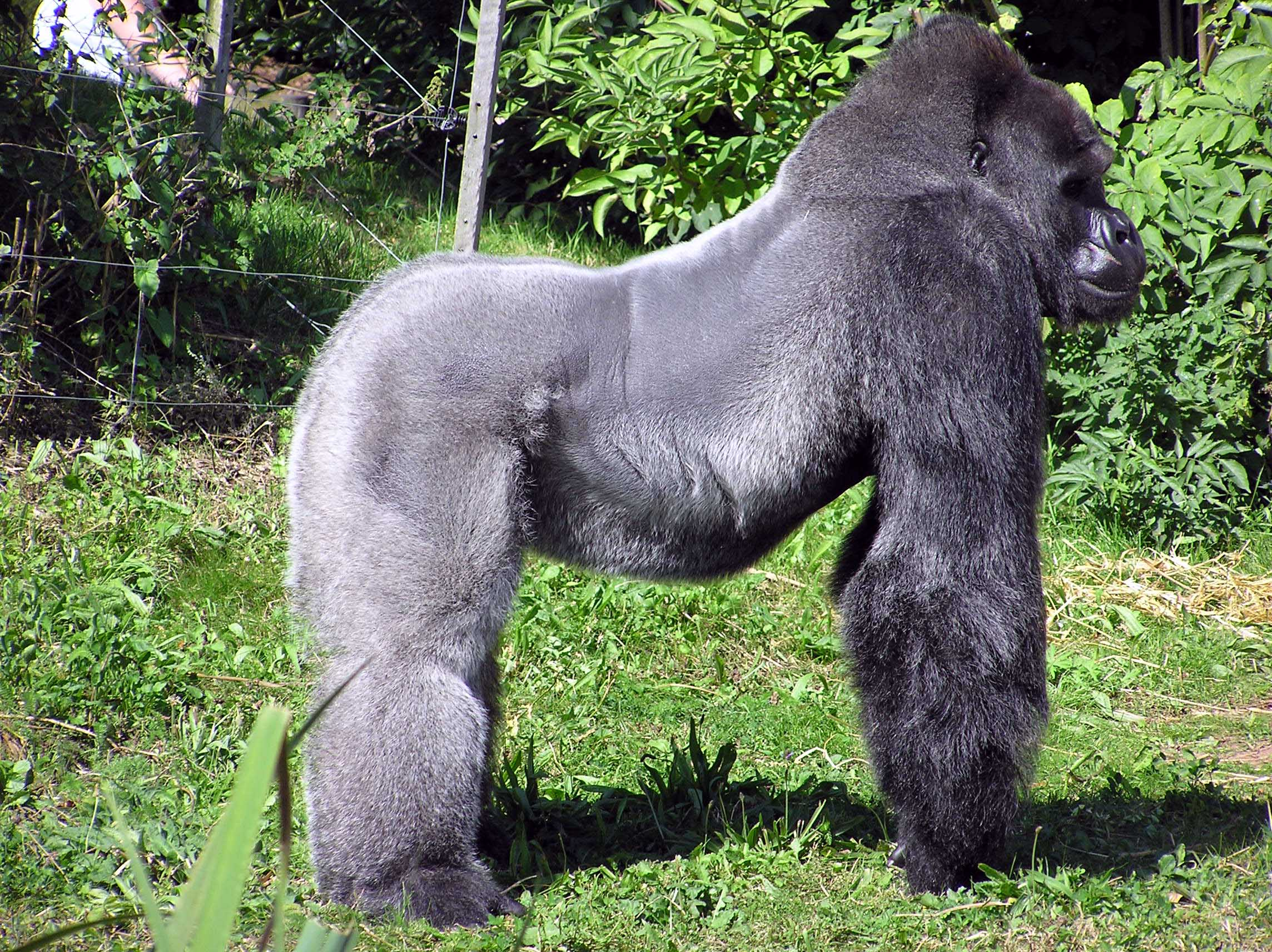
Western lowland gorilla

The new conservation breeding centre will include Annam leaf turtle, Lesser Antillean iguana, Pancake Tortoise, Radiated tortoise, Roti Island snake-necked turtle, Indochinese box turtle, Agalychnis lemur, Leptodactylus fallax, Marshall's pygmy chameleon, Lygodactylus williamsi, Varanus macraei, Uroplatus, Hogna ingens, Polynesian tree snail, Lord Howe Island stick insect, Socorro dove, Visayan tarictic hornbill, Sumatran laughingthrush, Philippine cockatoo, Javan green magpie, European turtle dove, Mindanao bleeding-heart, Negros bleeding-heart pigeon, pink pigeon, Malagasy cichlids, Malagasy rainbow fish and powder blue panchax, Pupfish and goodeids and White clawed crayfish.

Finally, there will be a new entrance with a new café, new gift shop and new entry exhibits.

The site officially opened on 22 July 2013 as Wild Place Project.

Future plans include a Bristol Zoo-managed conservation breeding centre with climate-controlled enclosures, learning centre and conservation medicine centre.

=== Closure ===
In 2020, BZS announced that Bristol Zoo Gardens would close in 2022 and the Wild Place Project will become the new Bristol zoo in early 2024 and will be home to new exhibits:

- Western lowland gorilla, collared mangabey, African grey parrots, slender-snouted crocodiles, okapi and mandrill will be in a new central African rainforest area.
- The eastern black rhinoceros and ostrich will join the giraffe, zebra, eland, red river hog and cheetah in the Benoue National Park area.

== Event hosting ==
The WOMAD music festival came to the zoo in 2011, with a subsequent event in 2012.

== See also ==
- Ape Action Africa
- Wow! Gorillas
