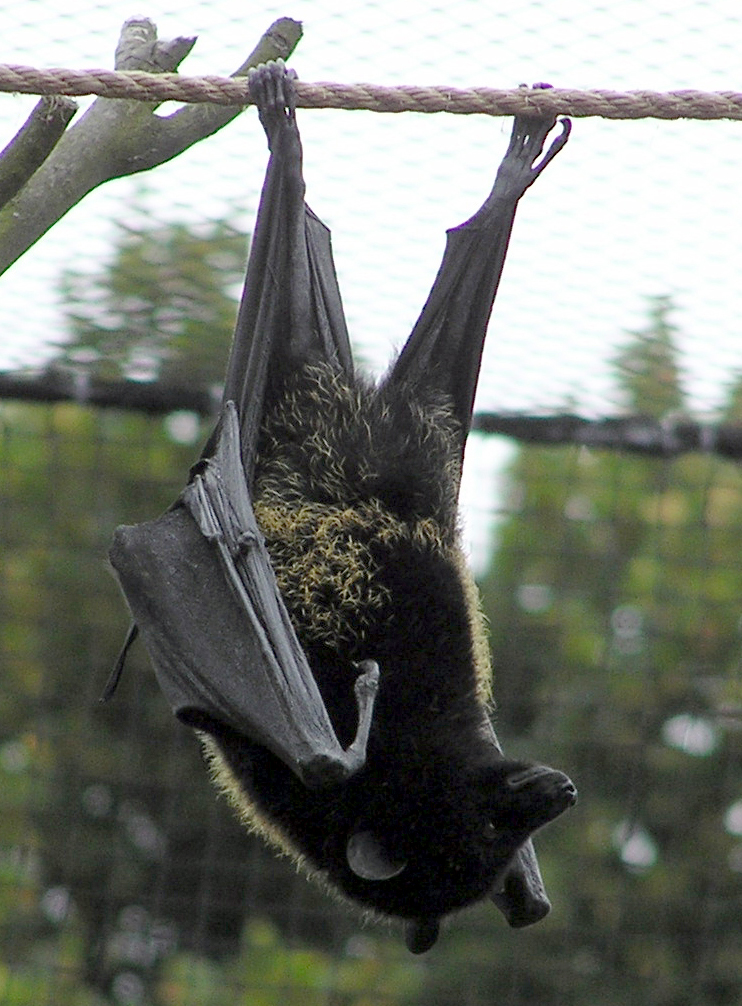
- In the Bristol Zoo of Bristol (England)

Conservation status
- Endangered (IUCN 3.1)

Scientific classification
- Kingdom: Animalia
- Phylum: Chordata
- Class: Mammalia
- Order: Chiroptera
- Family: Pteropodidae
- Genus: Pteropus
- Species: P. livingstonii

Binomial name
- Pteropus livingstonii Gray, 1866
- Livingstone's fruit bat range

= Livingstone's fruit bat =

Species of bat

Livingstone's fruit bat (Pteropus livingstonii), also called the Comoro flying fox, is a megabat in the genus Pteropus. It is an Old World fruit bat found only in the Anjouan and Mohéli islands in the Union of the Comoros in the western Indian Ocean.

It is the largest and rarest bat of all Comorian species. Its preferred habitat is montane forest above 200 metres (660 ft) on Mohéli and above 500 metres (1,600 ft) on Anjouan, the destruction of which is a major threat to the bat population. As of 2003, the total population was estimated at 1,200 individuals. Other threats to the bats' survival include storms, hunting, and their struggles to readapt to new habitats.

The black-bearded flying fox is believed to be one of the closest relatives of Livingstone's fruit bats, but experts differ as to whether or not these species belong to the same species group. No subspecies have been recognized.

== Physical appearance ==
Livingstone's fruit bats are mostly black in colour, with a scattering of golden or tawny hairs over the rump, belly, and flanks. The amount of golden hair varies between individuals, with some also having a narrow band of golden fur down the back, or golden patches on the shoulders, and others being pure black without any paler hair at all. The wings are black and hairless, as are the legs, nose, and large, rounded ears.

Distinguishing characteristics include their rounded ears, the colour of their fur, and their large, orange or red eyes, reflecting this bat's well-developed vision. Livingstone's fruit bats weigh 500 to 800 g (18 to 28 oz). They have a body length of about 30 cm (12 in) and a wingspan up to 1.4 m (4 ft 7 in). Males have a significantly higher bodyweight and longer forearms than their female counterparts.

The bats have a relatively slow, flapping flight, and often circle in an attempt to gain height, but are also, unlike nocturnal bats, capable of soaring on air thermals. Their wings have an aspect ratio of 6.52, and a wing loading of 25.8 N/m^{2}, and have been estimated to have a turning circle of 11.3 m (37 ft).

== Distribution and habitat ==
Livingstone's fruit bat is found only on the islands of Anjouan and Mohéli, within the Comoros archipelago between Africa and northern Madagascar. It inhabits montane forest above 200 metres (660 ft) on Moheli and above 500 metres (1,600 ft) on Anjouan. All current Livingstone's fruit bat roosts are restricted to a narrow midaltitudinal range and are strongly associated with the presence of native and endemic trees, with the biggest roosts located in dense-canopy, old-growth forest. Livingstone's flying fox appears to show a preference for roosting in certain tree species, in particular the endemic Nuxia pseudodentata and native Gambeya spp. and at forested sites that are typically found on steep slopes, next to valleys where permanent watercourses are present, and facing in a southeast direction and in depressions to provide protection from wind and the midday sun. Only 15 roost-sites are currently occupied in Anjouan and six at Moheli.

== Behaviour and biology ==
In captivity, a colony can have a dominant male with up to eight breeding females.

Livingstone's flying foxes are active both day and night, and are predominantly nocturnal, the highest activity was observed between 10 pm and 2 am. They typically fly to a feeding site a few hours before dusk, taking advantage of hot, daytime thermals, and hang from the trees before beginning to feed after nightfall.

They forage for food primarily in the upper canopy of the forest, whereas the two other fruit bats native to the Comoros, the Seychelles fruit bat and the Comoro rousette, forage in the middle and lower canopy, respectively.

The diet of Livingstone's fruit bats consists of fruit, pollen, nectar, seeds, and leaves. They have also been observed to hunt and eat moths in captivity.

They drive off intruders on their feeding territory with chattering sounds, clapping their wings, and chasing, sometimes culminating in clawing and biting. When alarmed, they make squeaking sounds or a deep series of "clucks".

After mating, the pregnant females relocate to maternity roost sites to give birth and raise their young until they reach maturity. They give birth to a single pup, typically in early September. The young pups are born fully furred and with their eyes open; their big feet are used to grip onto their mothers directly after birth. They begin to forage at 2.5 to 5.0 months of age, and males begin to establish territories at 6 months.

== Conservation ==
P. livingstonii is listed under Appendix I of the Convention on International Trade in Endangered Species of fauna and flora) In 1995, the IUCN developed an action plan for the species which included research, community education programs, and training of bat monitoring. A nongovernmental organization called Action Comoros initiated this action plan. Action Comoros developed an environmental education program, the main goals of which were to raise awareness, develop resources, train educators, promote knowledge, foster pride, and involve locals. These plans are important in the short-term benefits of conservation and improve a strong foundation of conservation programs for the long term.

A captive-breeding program was initiated by the Durrell Wildlife Conservation Trust in 1992. Having a captive-breeding program could save P. livingstonii from going completely extinct. Many efforts are being made to aid in the survival of P. livingstonii, but as the populations of the natives increase on these Comoros islands, deforestation will continue to rise, as well. As stated by the Durrell Wildlife Conservation Trust, "If the bats' natural habitat is not protected, this amazing species could be extinct within 10 years." The breeding program now includes other facilities, with the Bristol Zoo the site of 30 births from 1999–2013. Of those 30 pups, 23 survived. The year 2016 was a productive year for the Durrell colony, with six pups born by mid-June. The Bristol Zoo and the Durrell Wildlife Conservation Trust exchange male bats regularly to maintain genetic diversity and avoid inbreeding depression. Nonbreeding male bats have been sent to the Chester Zoo and the Zürich Zoologischer Garten. Due to its imperiled status, it is identified by the Alliance for Zero Extinction as a species in danger of imminent extinction.
