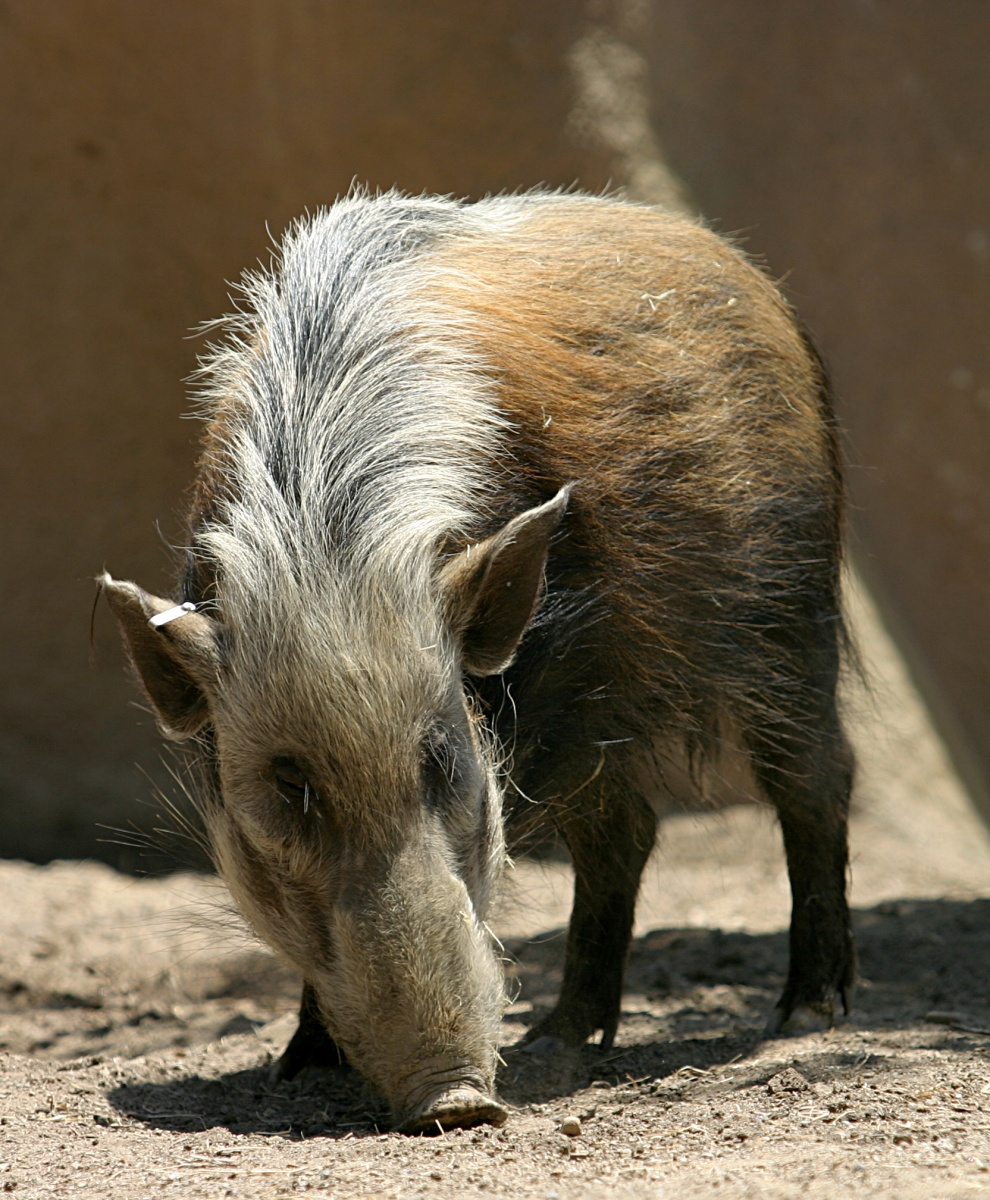
- Southern bushpig (P. larvatus koiropotamus) at the San Diego Zoo

Conservation status
- Least Concern (IUCN 3.1)

Scientific classification
- Kingdom: Animalia
- Phylum: Chordata
- Class: Mammalia
- Infraclass: Placentalia
- Order: Artiodactyla
- Family: Suidae
- Genus: Potamochoerus
- Species: P. larvatus

Binomial name
- Potamochoerus larvatus (F. Cuvier, 1822)

= Bushpig =

Species of mammal

The bushpig (Potamochoerus larvatus) is a member of the pig family that inhabits forests, woodland, riverine vegetation and cultivated areas in East and Southern Africa. Introduced populations are also probably present in Madagascar. There have also been unverified reports of their presence on the Comoro island of Mayotte. Bushpigs are mainly nocturnal. There are several subspecies.

The vernacular name 'bushpig' may be used for either Potamochoerus species.

== Description ==
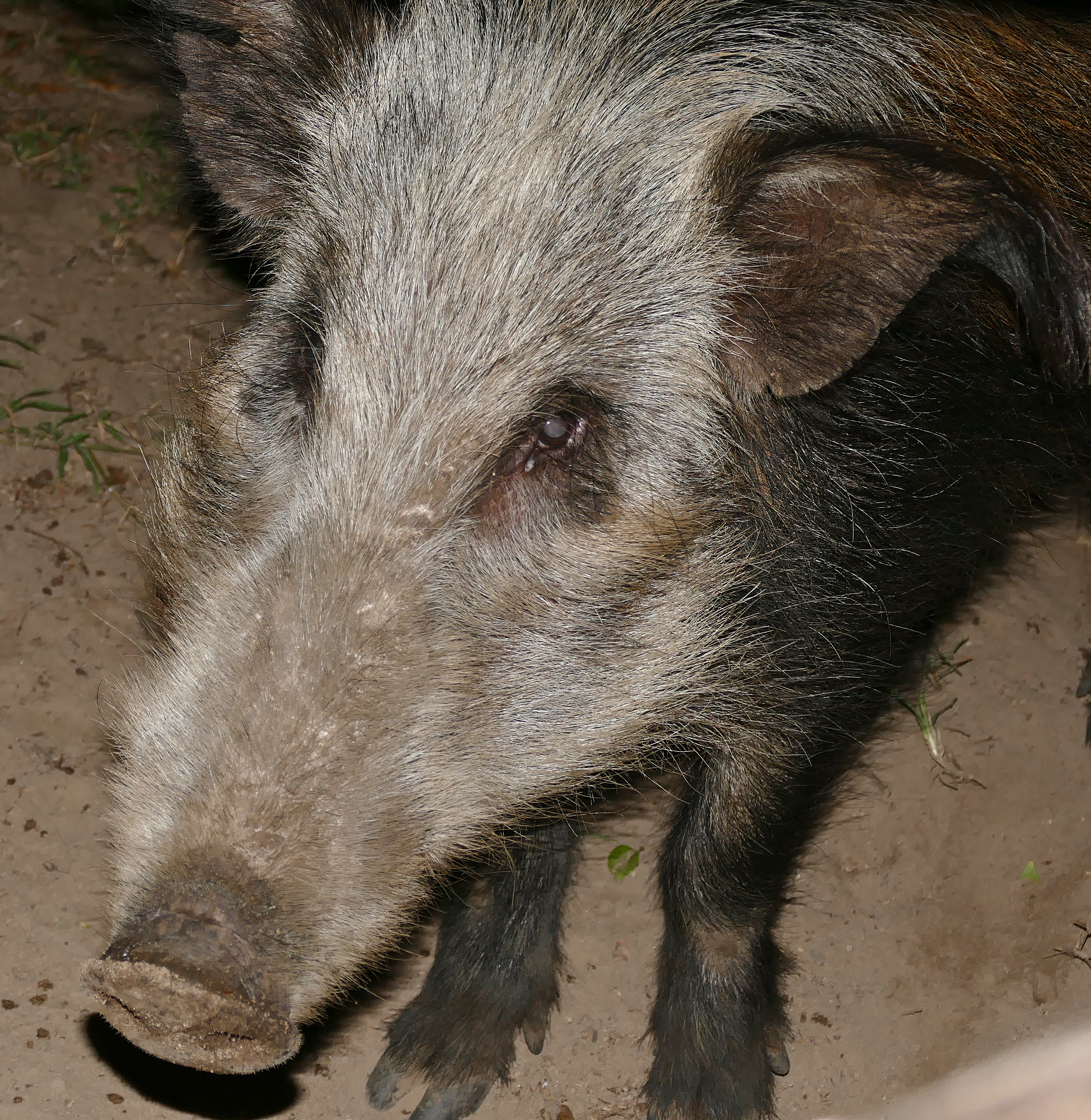
Close up of a bushpig

Adult bushpigs stand from 66 to 100 cm (26 to 39 in) at the shoulder, and mature boars can reach a weight of 150 kg (330 lb), although 60 to 80 kg (130 to 180 lb) is more common. Sows are 45 to 70 kg (99 to 154 lb). They resemble the domestic pig, and can be identified by their pointed, tufted ears and face mask.

Bushpigs vary in hair colour and skin colour over their range. Southern koiropotamus and nyasae populations are dark reddish, sometimes almost black. The coat colour darkens with age. Their heads may have a 'face mask' with a contrasting pattern of blackish to dark brown and white to dark grey markings, or may sometimes be completely whitish. The ears have tassels of long hairs. Their very sharp tusks are fairly short and inconspicuous. Unlike warthogs, bushpigs run with their long, thin tails held downward.

Males are typically larger than females. Old males develop two warts on their snout. Piglets are born with pale yellowish longitudinal stripes on a dark brown background; these soon disappear and the coat becomes reddish brown, with a black and white dorsal crest in both sexes. This mane bristles when the animal becomes agitated.

== Distribution ==
Distributed over a wide range, the bushpig occurs from Ethiopia and Somalia in the north to southeastern DR Congo and southwards through the Cape and KwaZulu-Natal Provinces, South Africa, where it is largely known from the areas around Johannesburg and all along the country's southern coast. It is also known to inhabit Botswana, Eswatini, Kenya, Malawi, Mozambique, Tanzania, Uganda, Zambia and Zimbabwe. The bushpig also occurs on Madagascar, and possibly other islands in the Comoros archipelago. It is not known how the species reached these locations, though it was likely transported there by humans, possibly after a brief period of domestication. Numerous hybrids with domesticated breeds of pig have also been reported.

The bushpig appears to have increased its range in Botswana during the late 1970s or early 1980s. In 1993, it was speculated that the northern range of the species had shrunk due to sahelisation. It is uncommon in Burundi.

== Taxonomy ==
For most of 20th century bushpigs were seen as a single species, Potamochoerus porcus, by almost all authors. In 1993 Peter Grubb, writing for the IUCN, split both the bushpig and the warthog into different species, and recognised numerous subspecies of all African hogs. The bushpig subspecies from West Africa (porcus), with more reddish hair, was seen as an independent species by him. Other authors have since continued to follow his interpretation of the bushpig. Because bushpigs had first been described from West Africa, this western taxon retained the name P. porcus, whereas all the other bushpig subspecies needed a new name. Bushpigs from the island of Madagascar had been described as a new species in 1822 by Frédéric Cuvier, P. larvatus, but were reduced to a subspecies of the bushpig when it was realised they were the same as those of mainland Africa. As Cuvier's publication had the oldest available name for the animals, this became the new Latin name for the other bushpig subspecies.

P. larvatus is very closely related to P. porcus, the bushpig from West Africa also known as 'red river hog', with which it can interbreed, although others dispute this. It is distinguished from the western pig by having a less reddish hair colour and the hair being coarser, longer and less dense. Some pig populations in Uganda display physical characteristics intermediate between the two species. P. porcus may sometimes aggregate in larger sounders than P. larvatus.

In the zone between the western forms and the other bushpigs, i.e. in DR Congo and South Sudan, it remained unclear which populations belonged to which species in 1993, although the IUCN now assigns them to this species.

Subspecies recognised in 1970 were:

- P. porcus koiropotamus – South Africa
- P. porcus nyasae – southeast Africa
- P. porcus larvatus – Madagascar

Grubb recognised four subspecies in 1993:

- P. larvatus larvatus – Comoros, western Madagascar
- P. larvatus hassama – Eritrea, Ethiopia, Sudan
- P. larvatus hova – eastern Madagascar, a small koiropotamus
- P. larvatus koiropotamus – Angola, South Africa, southeast Africa to southern Tanzania, Somalia?

If the Madagascar form is a feral introduction from East Africa, the East African subspecies needs to be renamed to larvatus. Nothing was known about the Somalian populations in 1993, which was why it was not recognised.

Subspecies recognised in 2005 were:

- P. larvatus larvatus – Comoros, western Madagascar
- P. larvatus edwardsi – eastern Madagascar, syn. hova
- P. larvatus hassama – Eritrea, Ethiopia, Sudan, South Sudan?
- P. larvatus koiropotamus – Cape Region
- P. larvatus nyasae – Angola, DRC, eastern South Africa, southeast Africa to southern Tanzania
- P. larvatus somaliensis – Somalia

== Ecology ==
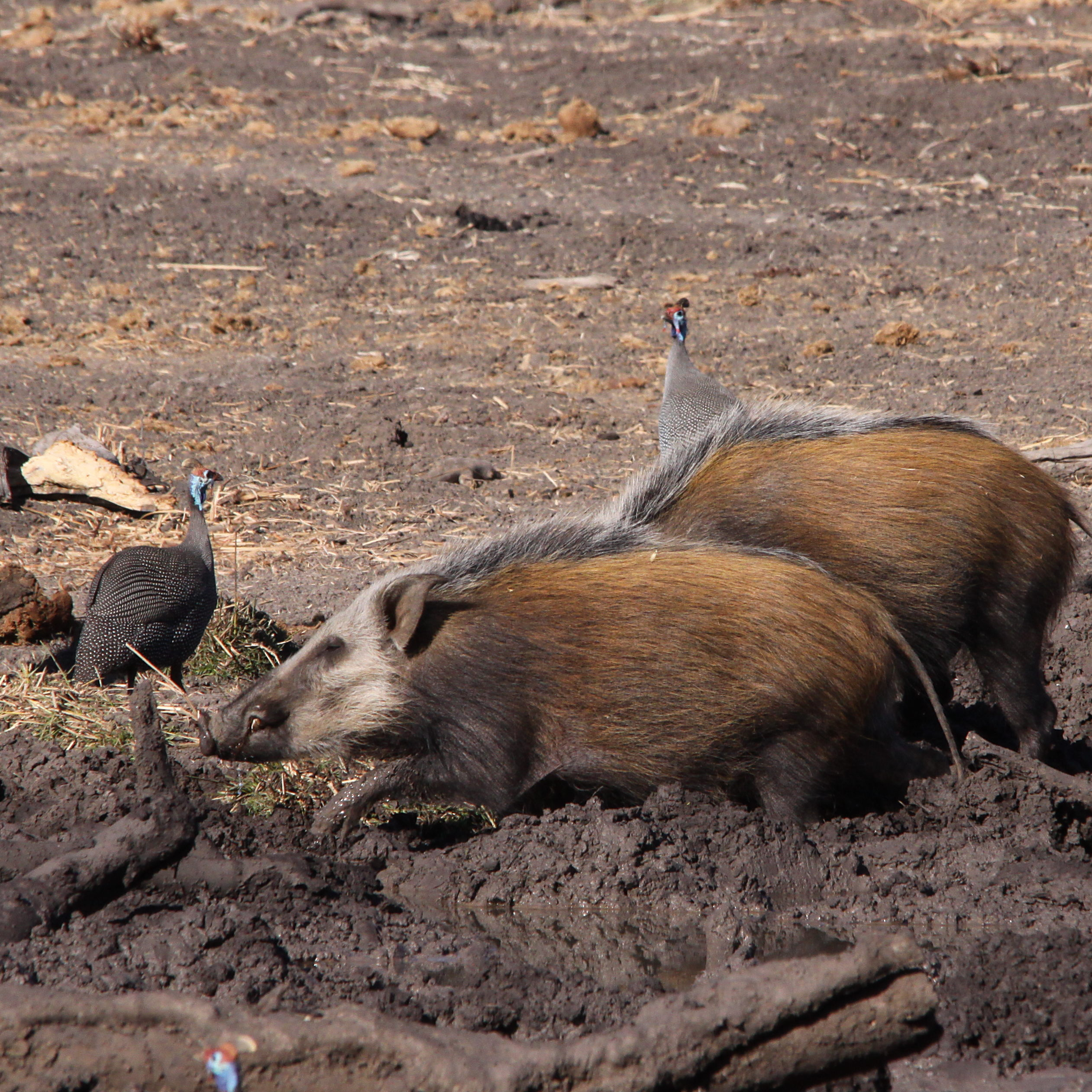
Two bushpigs together with helmeted guineafowl at Mapungubwe National Park in Limpopo Province, South Africa

The main habitat requirement is dense cover: bushpigs avoid open forests or savannas. They can be found in forests with high trees, montane forests, forest fringes, thick bushveld, gallery forests, flooded forest, swampland or cultivated areas as habitat. They occur up to 4,000 metres in altitude on Mount Kilimanjaro.

Bushpigs are quite social animals and are found in sounders (term for a social group of wild pigs) of up to twelve members, usually three to five. A typical group will consist of a dominant male and a dominant female, with other females and juveniles accounting for the rest. Groups engage in ritual aggressive behaviour when encountering each other, but will actually fight for large food sources. Sounders have home ranges, but are not territorial and different home ranges overlap. Groups generally keep away from each other. All intruders near the sounder are attacked, also non-bushpigs. Home ranges are 400 to 1,000 hectares, in Knysna (a forest region) the average was 720 hectare. Almost half the population consists of solitary wandering animals. Small bachelor groups of young males also form, these have ranges which overlay those of a few. The young males will avoid the sounders to escape confrontation. Litters of one to nine, usually three, young are born. From mating to the end of the gestation is a period of eight to ten months. After six months of age the alpha sow will aggressively chase the young males off; she will do the same to a few one to two year old beta sows. Young males are socially mature at 30 months of age. Mating mostly occurs in late autumn to early winter. Farrowing may occur at any time of the year but there is a pronounced peak in the warmest part of the summer (from October to February in South Africa).

The alpha sow builds a nest three metre wide and one metre high during the winter, with bedding consisting of stacked hay, twigs or plant debris from floods, to keep the litter of piglets for approximately four months while they wean. The males are the main care-givers, the sows visit the nest only to nurse the piglets. Sows have six teats.

They snort and grunt harshly while foraging or alarmed.

The pigs are essentially nocturnal, hiding in very dense thickets during the day. They never hide in aardvark burrows. Leopards are their main predator; combating leopards has increased bushpig numbers.

== Diet and relation to humans ==
Bushpigs are very aggressive and extremely powerful. In one case a game scout was forced to spend three days in a tree avoiding a stalking bushpig. Wounded bushpig are very dangerous; their spoor should not be followed alone. They are fast, and can swim well.

Bushpig will range up to 4 km from their hide in a night to feed. A 1990 study in the Cape found an average daily movements of 3 km, with an amplitude of 0.7 to 5.8 km. They are omnivorous and their diet can include roots, crops, succulent plants, water sedges, rotten wood, insects, small reptiles, eggs, nestlings and carrion. Tubers, bulbs and fruit are the most important food. Eggs and nestlings are also a favorite. Both fresh and very rotten carrion is eaten. Small young antelope are stalked and consumed. A behaviour observed in Uganda is to follow a troop of monkeys or baboons in the trees above to feed on the falling fruit and peels. During droughts high mortalities have occurred in South Africa. In South Africa, 40% of the diet was tubers and other underground plant parts, 30% was herbage, 13% fruit, 9% animal matter and 8% fungi.

It is known for destructive grubbing, uprooting shrubs and scattering them around, unearthing all root crops, feeding on only a few, and trampling the rest. Favourite crops are pô-pô, sugarcane, bananas and maize. It cuts down such taller plants at their base to reach the fruit. Other favourite agricultural crops are beans, peas, groundnuts, sweet potatoes, pumpkin, potatoes, carrots, pineapple, spanspek, watermelon, nuts, alfalfa, and green pasture. Chicken pens are often destroyed and raided. There are also a few incidents of bushpig breaking into domestic pig paddocks to kill and eat both the sows and the young piglets.

They are a significant nuisance animal in the agricultural regions, and are hunted fairly extensively. However, the population of bushpigs in many farming areas is stable or growing despite the hunting efforts, due to largely inaccessible terrain, abundance of food, lack of predators, relatively high reproductive potential, and their rapid ability to adapt to hunting methods. At camping sites they can also become a nuisance, learning to raid the tents. In Islamic parts of East Africa and parts of Madagascar, it is a further nuisance because, as it is a pig, it is not permitted to be eaten, although in some areas 'red' bushpig meat is not considered haram like 'white' pig meat. Some Zambian ethnicities also avoid bushpig meat, believing it harbours diseases such as epilepsy. Its meat is considered a delicacy in South Africa; prices have fluctuated widely between 1995 and 2005. Throughout Africa, it is almost exclusively sold in local markets, although meat sometimes turns up in the larger towns or cities. It is often the main money maker for hunters in Gabon, constituting up to 80% of the total income. Hunters generally consume only about a third themselves, the rest is sold as bushmeat. In northern Zambian National Parks, it is sometimes a main target of poaching for bushmeat. It is leaner than pork.

Eradicating or controlling their numbers on the farm is quite difficult. They quickly learn to stay away from hunters, and will flee even when the hunter is still 200 metres away in thick bushveld. The best way to shoot one is to hide at one of its game trails towards a food source (called a 'restaurant') in the evening. Trapping also does not work easily, as bushpigs are wary of new and unfamiliar objects in their territories, and will avoid a trap for several months. They are also suspicious of unfamiliar objects such as cigarette butts on their trails or broken branches or scuff-marks in the soil, and will avoid the area when they find them. Using packs of specially trained dogs to hunt is more efficient, but dogs may be killed by the boars if they are not careful. Another way of killing the pigs is to make a large and very sturdy boma with a closing mechanism and regularly stock it with feed for a period of two or three months, before engaging the mechanism with a whole sounder or more inside. Setting this up must be done carefully by the same person alone in the same shoes, so as not to arouse the hogs' suspicion.

In Southern Africa governments organise periodic culls to reduce bushpig numbers. The governments of Malawi and the Democratic Republic of the Congo (in the 1940s) also have. In Madagascar this might also be necessary to protect other native species. Such cullings have generally been unsuccessful.

== Conservation ==
The IUCN first assessed the bushpig as 'not threatened' in 1993, and 'lower risk' in 1996. It was assessed as 'least concern' in their Red List in 2008; the 2015 assessment is identical to the 2008 one.

There is no international trade in the species, save for a very small handful that have been exported to zoos. Populations are found in numerous well-protected areas throughout its range.
