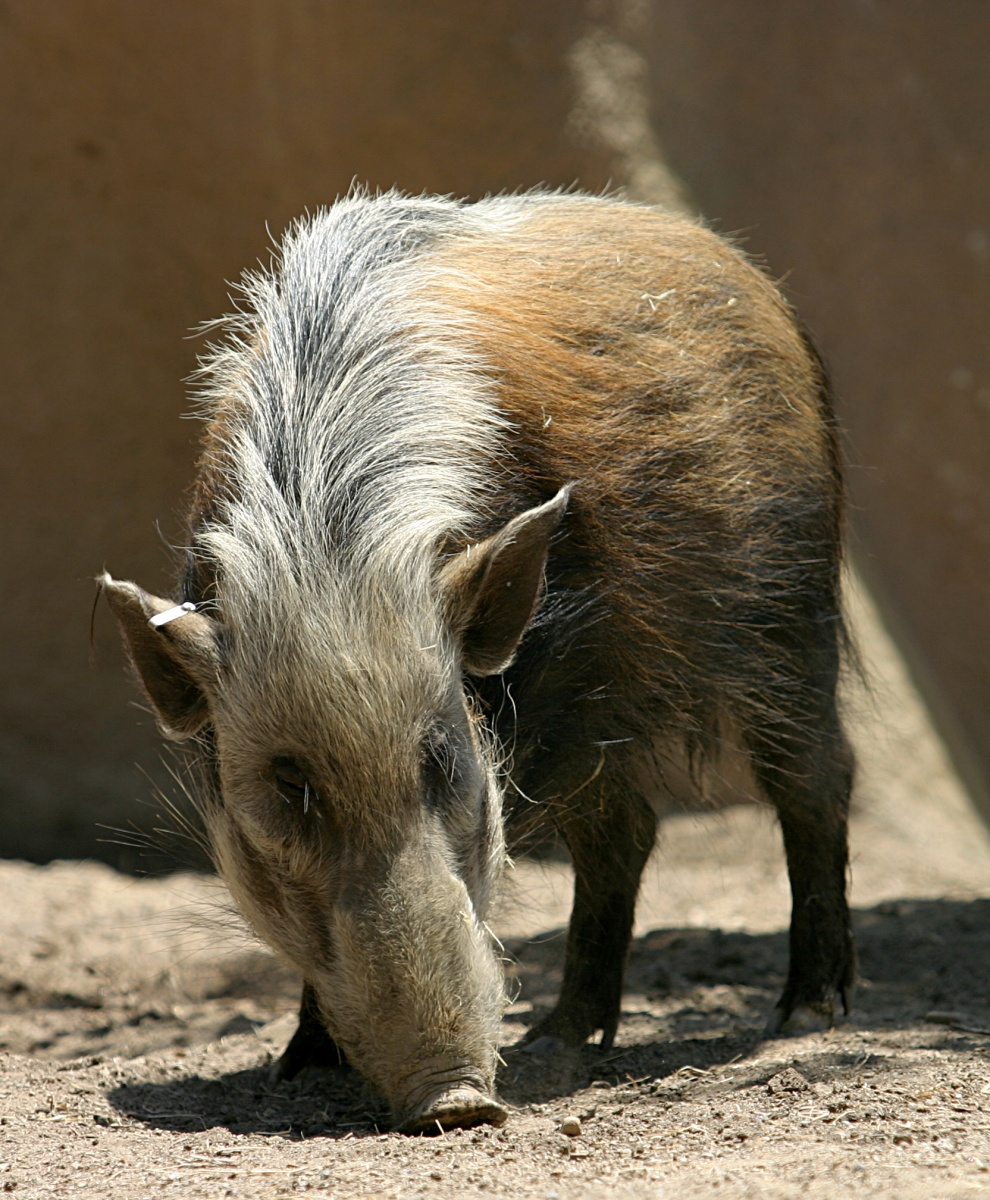
- Bushpig (Potamochoerus larvatus)

Scientific classification
- Kingdom: Animalia
- Phylum: Chordata
- Class: Mammalia
- Infraclass: Placentalia
- Order: Artiodactyla
- Family: Suidae
- Subfamily: Suinae
- Genus: Potamochoerus; Gray, 1854

Type species
- Choiropotamus pictus Linnaeus, 1758

Species
- Potamochoerus larvatus (F. Cuvier, 1822) †Potamochoerus magnus (A. Arribas & G. Garrido, 2008); Potamochoerus porcus (Linnaeus, 1758)

= Potamochoerus =

Genus of mammals

Potamochoerus (from Ancient Greek ποταμός (potamós), meaning "river", and χοῖρος (khoîros), meaning "pig") is a genus in the pig family (Suidae). The two species are restricted to sub-Saharan Africa, although the bushpig, possibly due to introduction by humans, also occurs in Madagascar and nearby islands. Early in the 20th century, there were considered to be as many as five different species within the genus. These were gradually consolidated, until, in the 1970s, it was generally agreed that all were representatives of just a single species (P. porcus). The bushpig was again recognised as a separate species from about 1993.

The oldest fossils that can be assigned to the genus date from the mid Pliocene in Europe, and are first seen in Africa from least the mid Pleistocene, suggesting that it originally evolved in somewhere in Eurasia. However, molecular phylogenetic evidence suggests that the genus first diverged from the line leading to the giant forest hog and the warthogs much earlier, in the late Miocene, between 11.9 and 5.6 million years ago. The same studies suggest that the two living species diverged from one another between 4.8 and 0.2 million years ago.

== Species ==
=== Extant species ===
Image	Scientific name	Common name	Distribution
	Potamochoerus larvatus (F. Cuvier, 1822)	Bushpig	East and Southern Africa.
	Potamochoerus porcus (Linnaeus, 1758)	Red river hog	Guinean and Congolian forests

=== Fossils ===
- †Potamochoerus magnus
