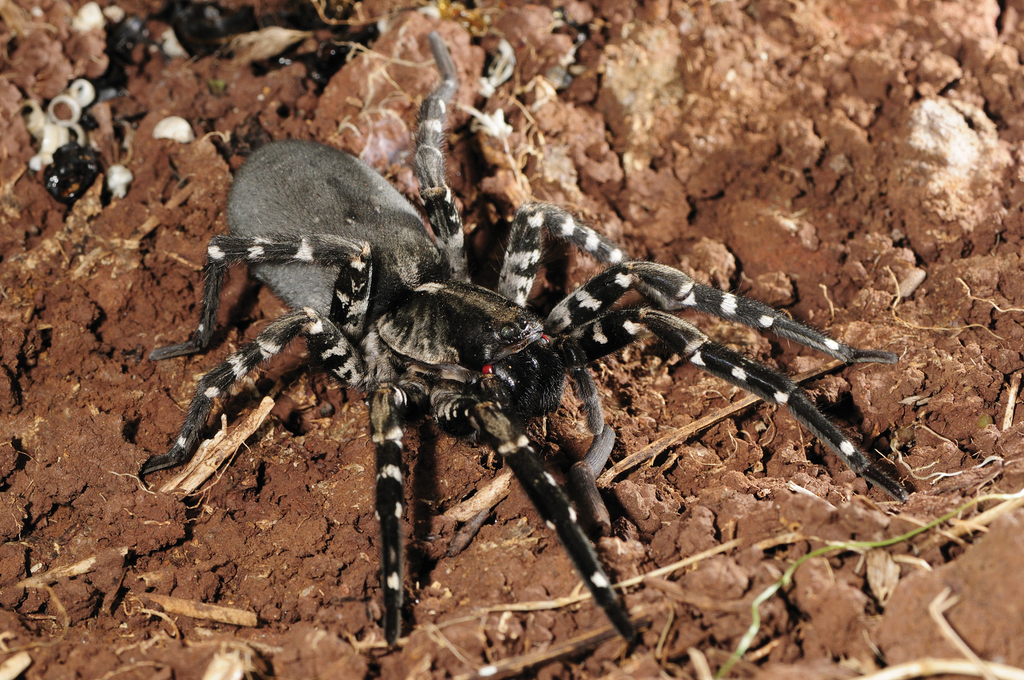
- Female Hogna ingens

Conservation status
- Critically Endangered (IUCN 3.1)

Scientific classification
- Kingdom: Animalia
- Phylum: Arthropoda
- Subphylum: Chelicerata
- Class: Arachnida
- Order: Araneae
- Infraorder: Araneomorphae
- Family: Lycosidae
- Genus: Hogna
- Species: H. ingens

Binomial name
- Hogna ingens (Blackwall, 1857)

Synonyms
- Lycosa ingens Blackwall, 1857; Trochosa ingens (Blackwall, 1857); Geolycosa ingens (Blackwall, 1857)

= Hogna ingens =

Species of spider

Hogna ingens, also known as the Deserta Grande wolf spider, the Desertas giant black wolf spider, or the Desertas giant wolf spider, is a critically endangered species of wolf spider belonging to the family Lycosidae. This spider is endemic to the Deserta Grande Island of the Madeira archipelago, specifically a remote valley, the Vale de Castanheira.

== Taxonomy ==
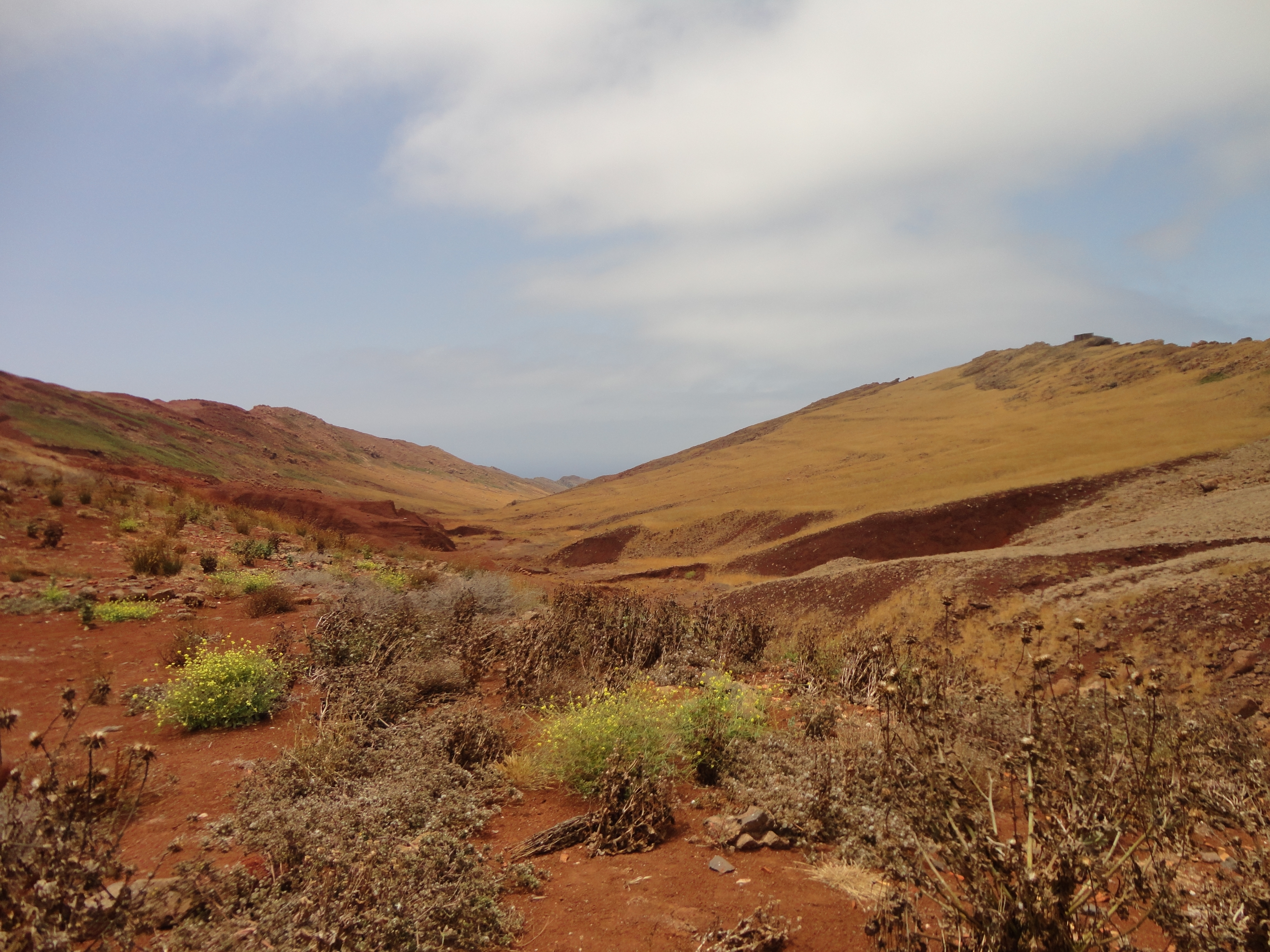
The Castanheira Valley, typical habitat of this species

Hogna ingens was first formally described as Lycosa ingens in 1857 by the English naturalist John Blackwall based on two female specimens found hiding under a stone on one of the Desertas Islands and sent to Blackwall by James Yate Johnson. This species is now classified in the genus Hogna within the family Lycosidae, the wolf spiders.

== Biology ==
Coloration is grey and black with white spots on the legs. The spider hides under rocks and crevices on the volcanic island of Deserta Grande, but its habitat is being invaded by the grass Phalaris aquatica, while the native vegetation is damaged by introduced goats and rabbits. The spider preys on smaller relatives, millipedes, insects, and even small lizards. It is capable of delivering a painful and venomous bite to humans.

Adult numbers have been estimated at less than 5,000, making it one of the rarest wolf spider species. It is also believed to be one of the largest wolf spiders on earth, with a 12 cm (4.7 in) leg span for the female, somewhat smaller for the male (the Latin ingens means "huge" or "monstrous").

== Captive breeding ==
In 2016 a captive breeding programme was set up at Bristol Zoo with 25 individuals being captured and taken to the zoo. More than 1000 spiderlings were produced in 2017 and it is hoped that some of them can be reintroduced to Desertas to boost populations.
