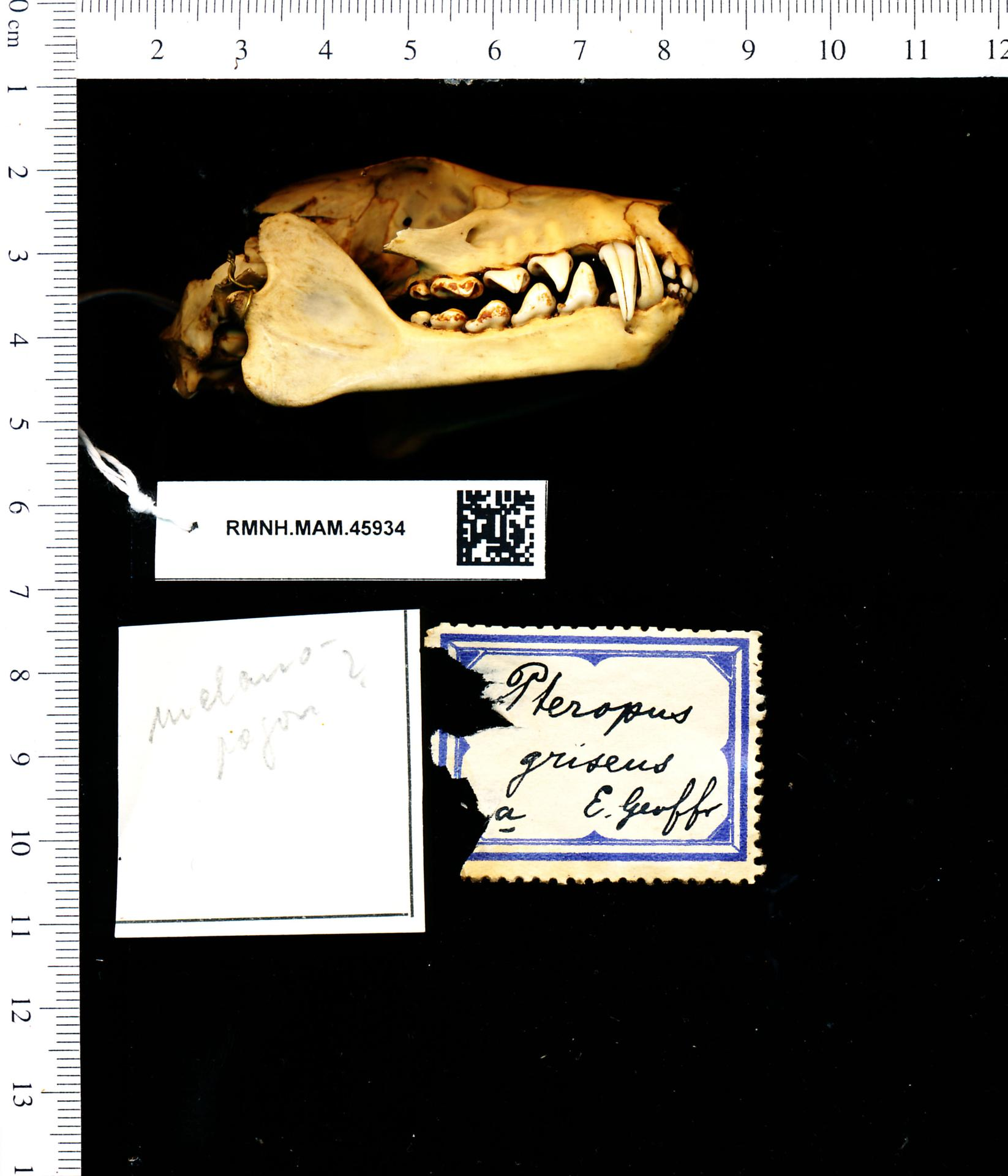

Conservation status
- Endangered (IUCN 3.1)

Scientific classification
- Kingdom: Animalia
- Phylum: Chordata
- Class: Mammalia
- Order: Chiroptera
- Family: Pteropodidae
- Genus: Pteropus
- Species: P. melanopogon

Binomial name
- Pteropus melanopogon Peters, 1867
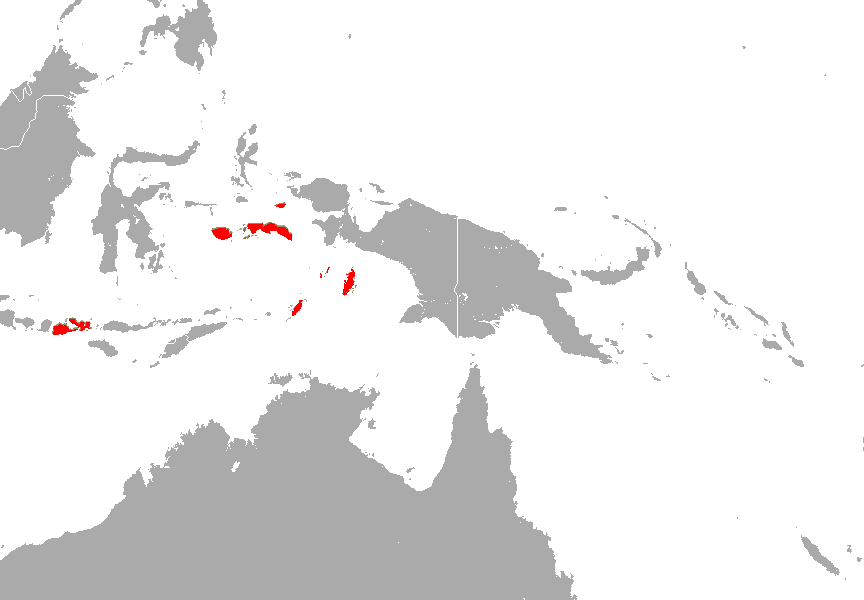
- Black-bearded flying fox range (map also includes range of Aru flying fox and Kei flying fox)

Synonyms
- Pteropus phaiops Temminck; Eunycteris phaiops Gray

= Black-bearded flying fox =

Species of mammal

The black-bearded flying fox (Pteropus melanopogon) is an endangered species of megabat in the genus Pteropus. It is endemic to Indonesia, found on the islands of Ambon, Buru, Seram, Banda, and Yamdena. Currently considered monotypic, it formerly included the Aru flying fox and Kei flying fox as subspecies.

== Taxonomy and etymology ==
It was described in 1867 by German naturalist Wilhelm Peters based on an individual in the collection of Hermann Schlegel. Its species name comes from the Neo-Latin melanin, which is derived from Ancient Greek "mélas", meaning "black", and Ancient Greek pṓgōn, meaning "beard". As the genus Pteropus is speciose, it is divided into closely related species groups. The black-bearded flying fox is identifier of the melanopogon species group, which also includes the following species:

- Aru flying fox (Pteropus aruensis)
- Kei flying fox (Pteropus keyensis)

== Description ==
Adults weigh approximately 510–900 g (1.12–1.98 lb). It is one of the heavier species of its family, based on the few individuals that have been weighed. The fur is dark red on its brow, face, between the eyes, and under the jaw. On its head, neck, shoulders, and ventral side, it is bright reddish brown. Individual hairs are bicolored, with the base of the hair pale and yellowish while the tip is darker. Its dorsal surface is dark brown, with bright yellow hairs sparsely throughout. The uropatagium is covered with long, dark brown fur. Its forearm is approximately 175–193 mm (6.9–7.6 in) long. Its ears are shorter than its muzzle. While in many species of bats the wings attach to the sides of the body, in this species, the wings attach closer to the spine. The legs and forearms lack fur. The baculum is 9.45 mm (0.372 in) long. It has a robust skull compared to other members of its genus.

== Biology ==
It has been observed feeding on the flowers of durian trees. It is a colonial species, forming roosts of up to 200 individuals. Colonies are usually conspecific, although they have been observed roosting with the Moluccan flying fox, though not in the same tree. It is a known host of at least one species of mite in the family Gastronyssidae, Opsonyssus asiaticus, which lives in its nasal cavities.

== Range and habitat ==
It is endemic to the Maluku Islands, which are a part of Indonesia. The only known remaining colony roosts in mangrove forests on Seram Island. In the past, its range included Ambon Island, Buru, Banda Islands, and Yamdena, though there are no recent observations on any of these islands.

== Conservation ==
In the 1800s, its population was abundant. It is currently evaluated as endangered by the IUCN. At present, there is only one colony of this species remaining, and it consists of fewer than 200 individuals. The species is not protected, and the habitat that supports the remaining colony is not protected either. From 2016–2049, its population is expected to decline by 50%. Threats to this species include habitat destruction via deforestation and overhunting for bushmeat. Because it is a highly-colonial species, it is a popular target for hunters, and its population is vulnerable to drastic decline.
