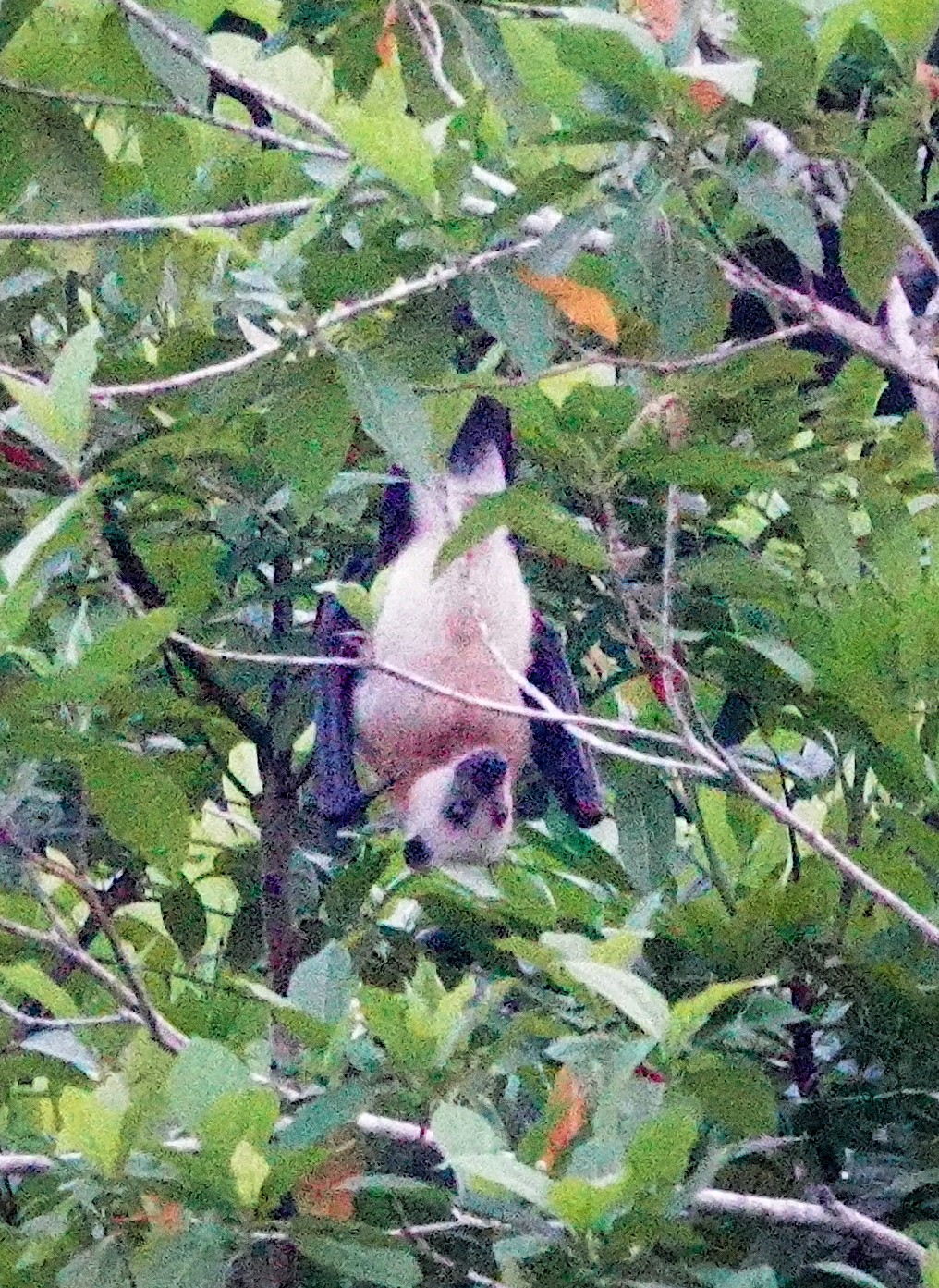

Conservation status
- Data Deficient (IUCN 3.1)

Scientific classification
- Domain: Eukaryota
- Kingdom: Animalia
- Phylum: Chordata
- Class: Mammalia
- Order: Chiroptera
- Family: Pteropodidae
- Genus: Pteropus
- Species: P. keyensis

Binomial name
- Pteropus keyensis Peters, 1867
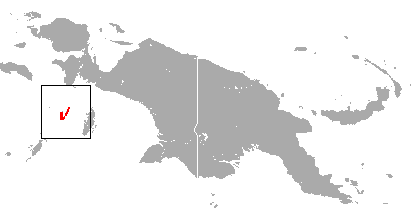
- Kei flying fox range

= Kei flying fox =

Species of bat

The Kei flying fox (Pteropus keyensis) is a species of megabat in the genus Pteropus found in the Kai Islands of Indonesia. It was formerly considered a subspecies of the black-bearded flying fox (Pteropus melanopogon). Very little is known about the species, its habitat, or threats to it.
