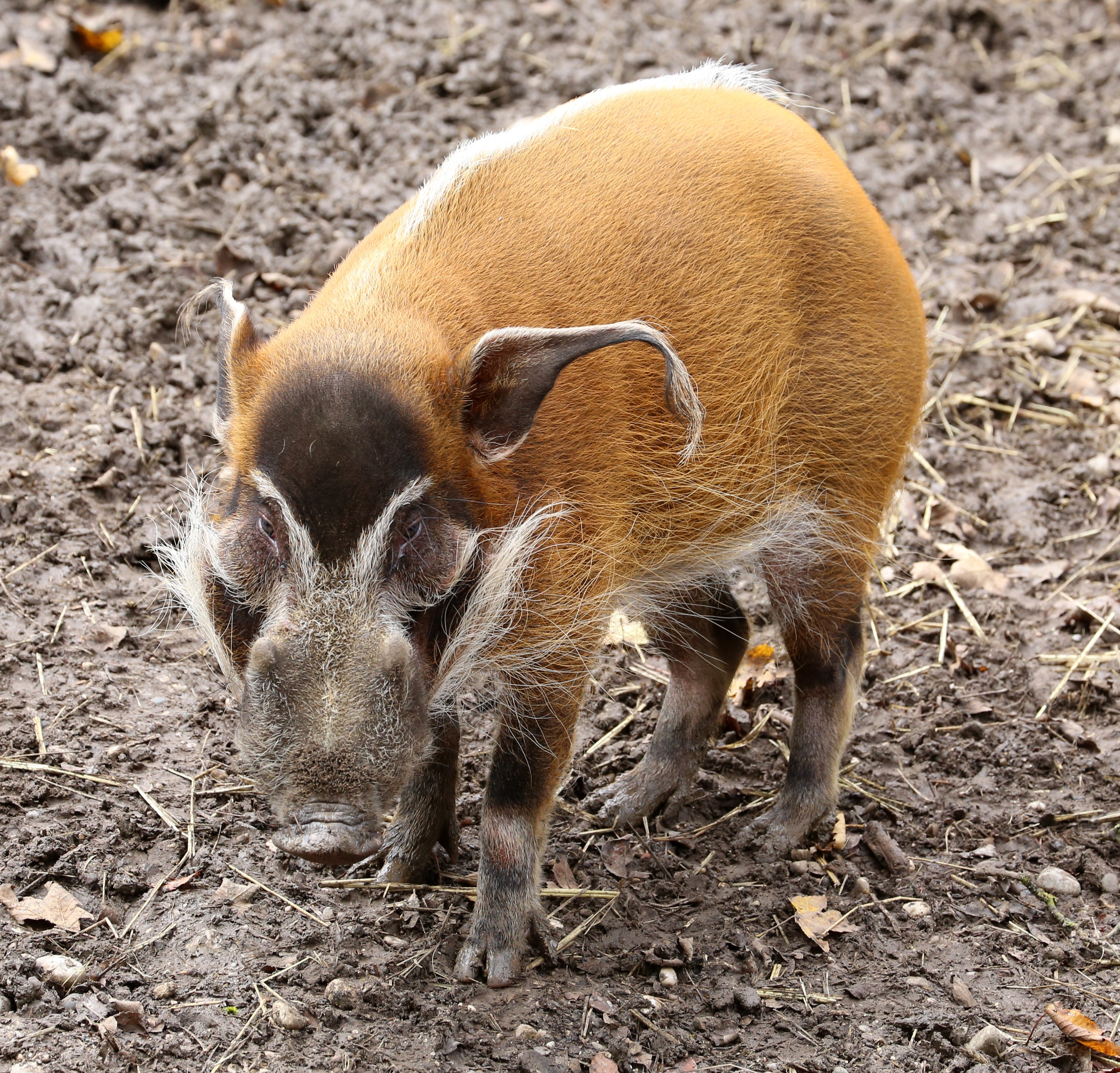
- Male at Tierpark Hellabrunn in Munich, Germany
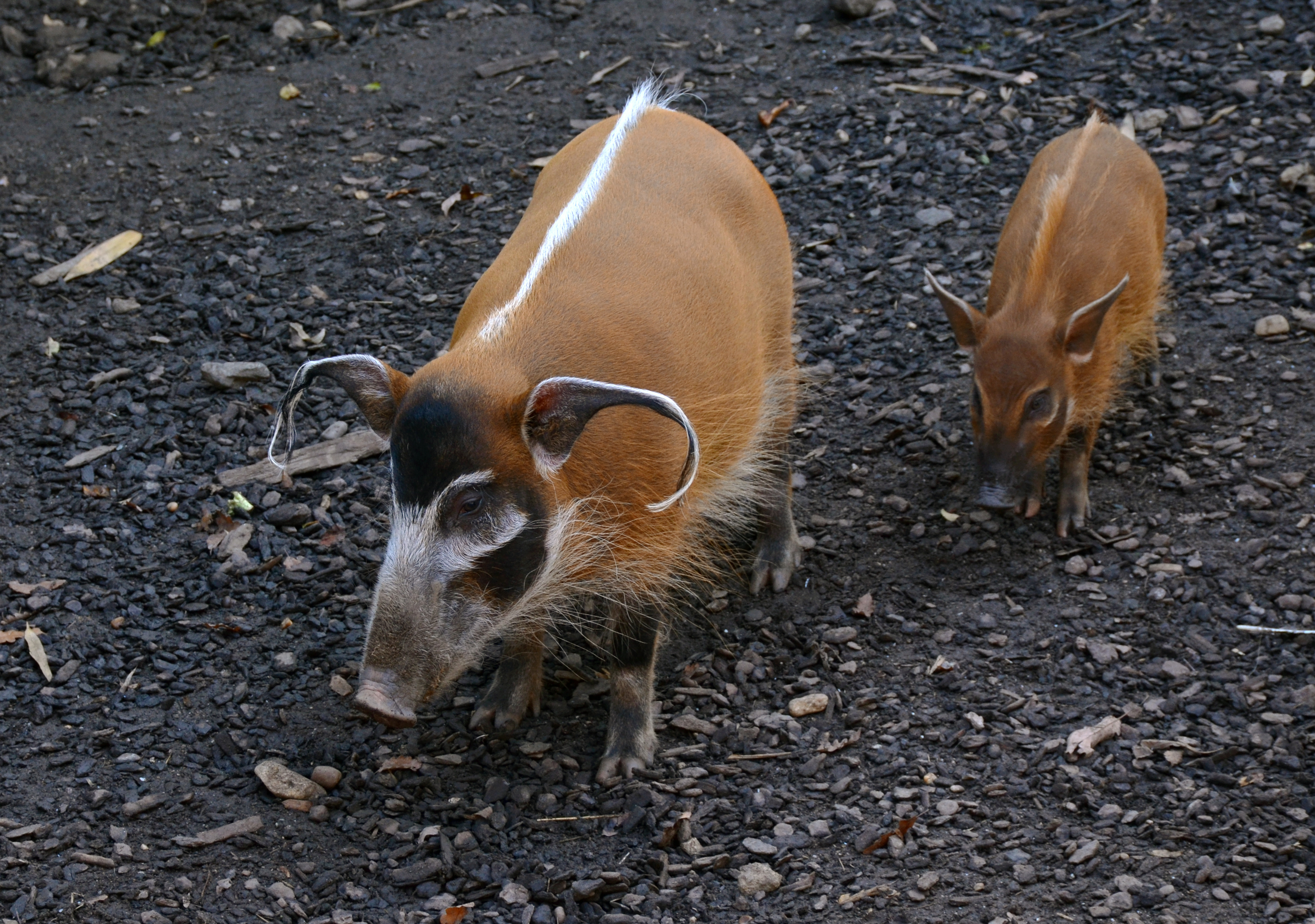
- Female with juvenile at Amneville Zoo in Amnéville, France

Conservation status
- Least Concern (IUCN 3.1)

Scientific classification
- Kingdom: Animalia
- Phylum: Chordata
- Class: Mammalia
- Order: Artiodactyla
- Family: Suidae
- Genus: Potamochoerus
- Species: P. porcus

Binomial name
- Potamochoerus porcus (Linnaeus, 1758)
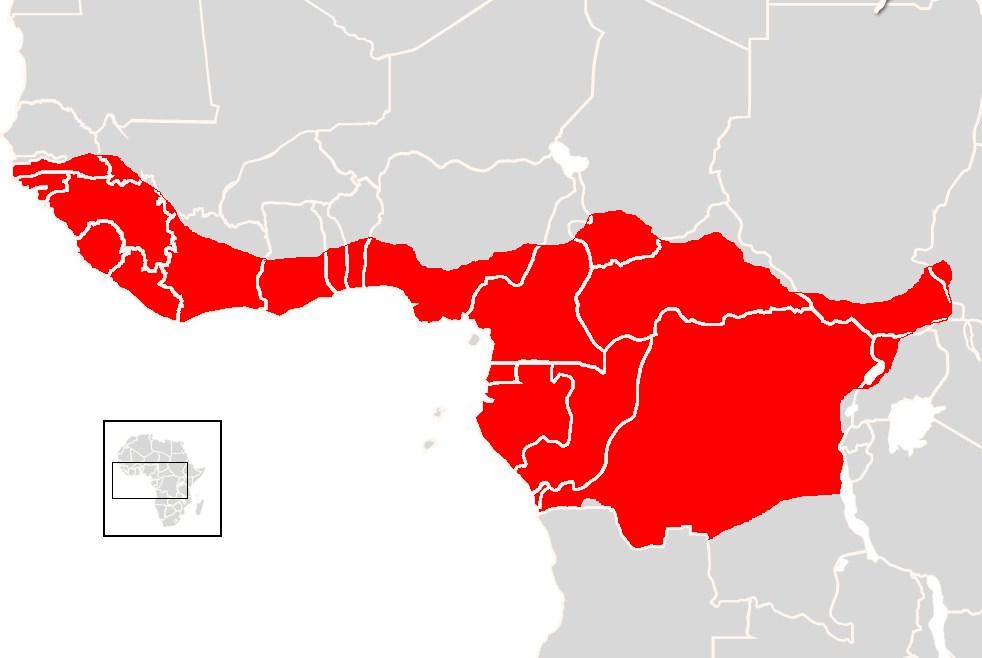

Synonyms
- Sus porcus Linnaeus, 1758

= Red river hog =

Species of pig

The red river hog (Potamochoerus porcus) or bushpig (a name also used for Potamochoerus larvatus) is a wild member of the pig family living in Africa, with most of its distribution in the Guinean and Congolian forests. It is rarely seen away from rainforests and generally prefers areas near rivers or swamps.

== Description ==
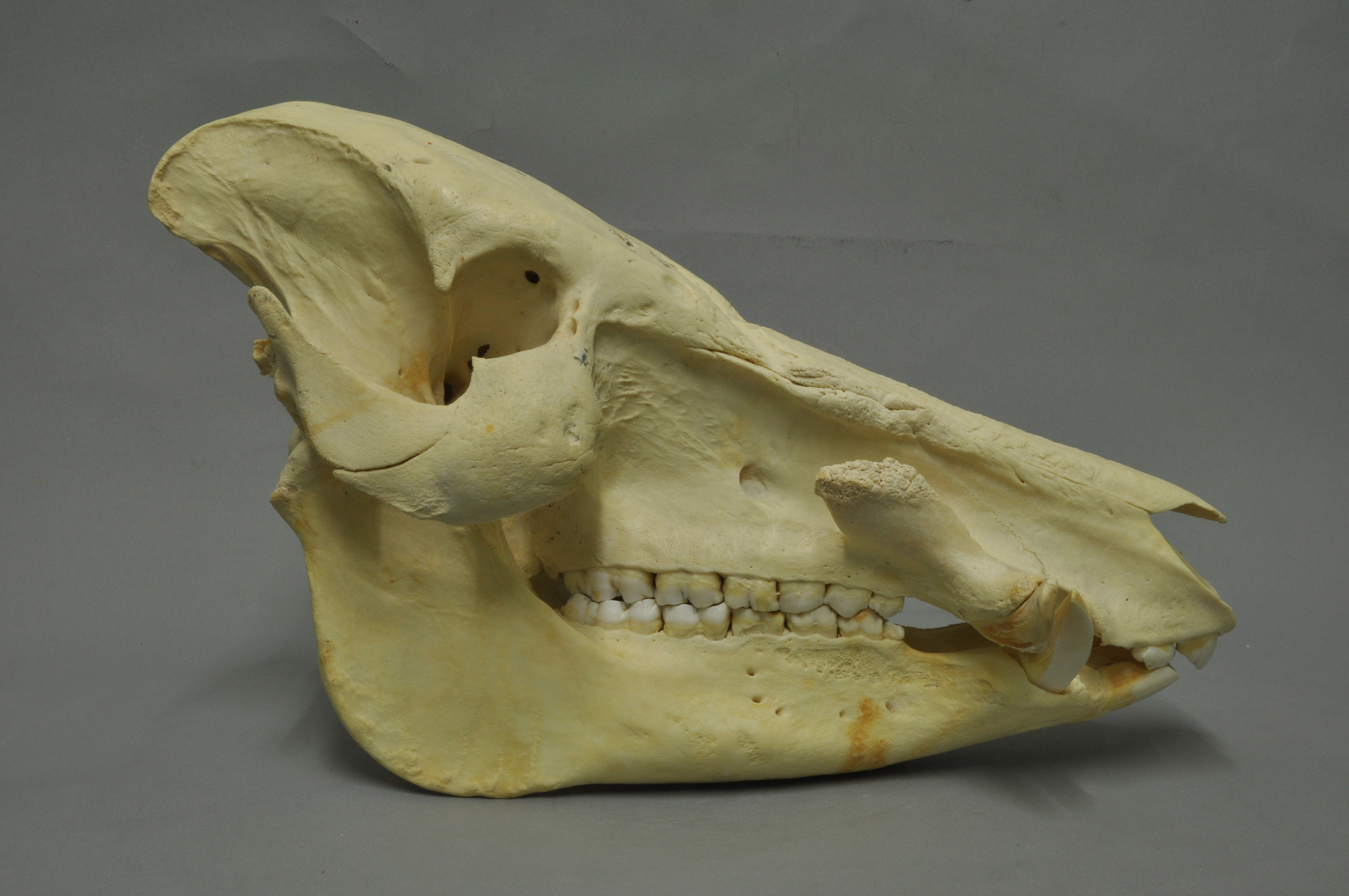
The skull

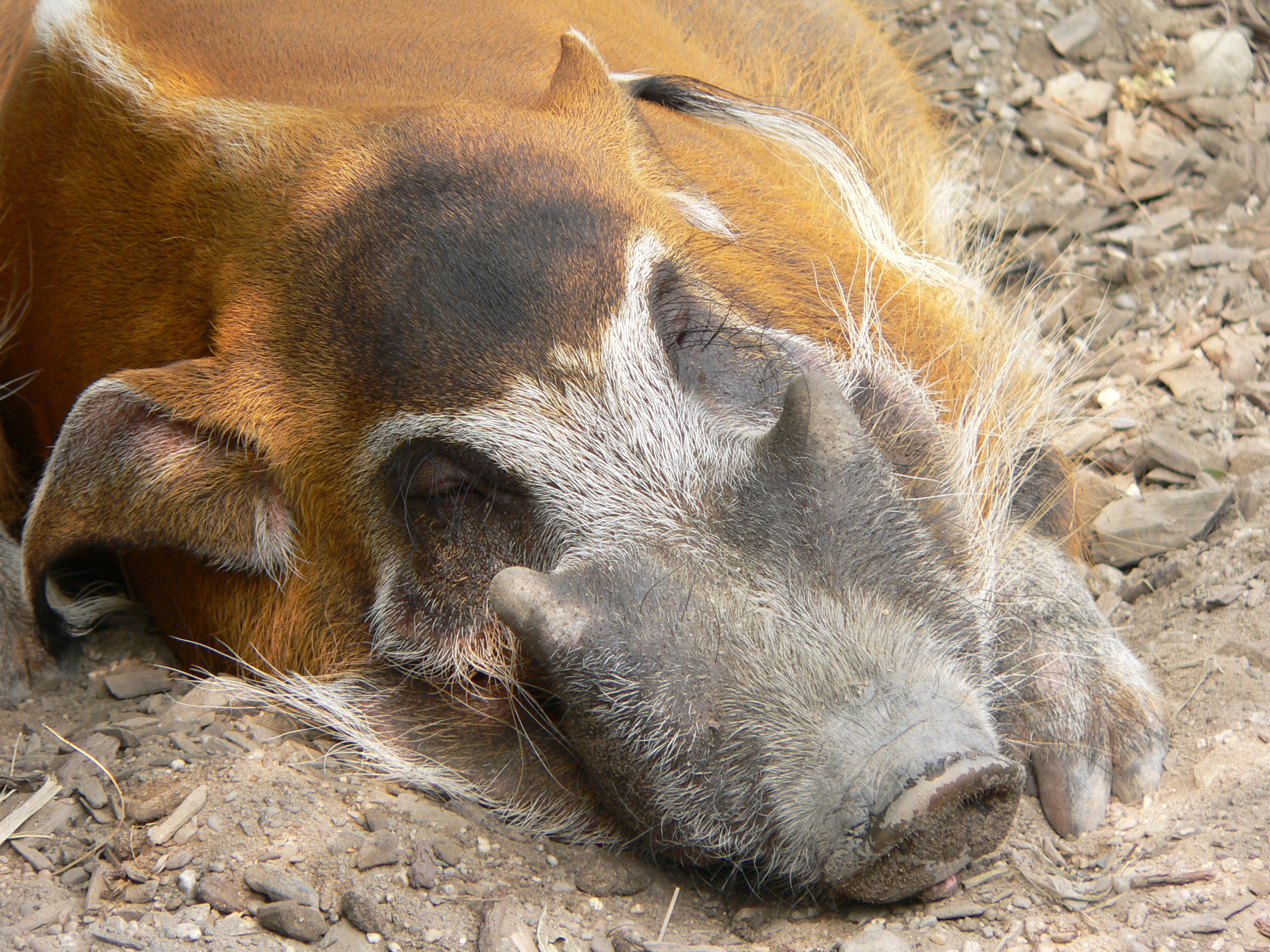
Male with distinct bony facial protuberances

The red river hog has striking orange to reddish-brown fur, with black legs and a tufted white stripe along the spine. Adults have white markings around the eyes and on the cheeks and jaws; the rest of the muzzle and face are a contrasting black. The fur on the jaw and the flanks is longer than that on the body, with the males having especially prominent facial whiskers. Unlike other species of pig native to tropical Africa, the entire body is covered in hair, with no bare skin visible.

Adults weigh 45 to 115 kg (99 to 254 lb) and stand 55 to 80 cm (22 to 31 in) tall, with a length of 100 to 145 cm (39 to 57 in). The thin tail is 30 to 45 cm (12 to 18 in) long and ends in a tuft of black hair. The ears are also long and thin, ending in tufts of white or black hair that may reach 12 cm (4.7 in) in length. Boars are somewhat larger than sows and have distinct conical protuberances on either side of the snout and rather small, sharp tusks. The facial protuberances are bony and probably protect the boar's facial tendons during head-to-head combat with other males.

Red river hogs have a dental formula of 3.1.3–4.33.1.3–4.3, similar to that of wild boar. Both sexes have scent glands close to the eyes and on the feet; males have additional glands near the tusks on the upper jaw and on the penis. There is also a distinctive glandular structure about 2 cm (0.79 in) in diameter on the chin, which probably has a tactile function. Females have six teats.

== Distribution and habitat ==
The red river hog lives in rainforests, wet dense savannas, and forested valleys, and near rivers, lakes, and marshes. The species' distribution ranges from the Congo area and Gambia to the eastern Congo, southwards to the Kasai and the Congo River. The exact delineation of its range versus that of the bushpig is unclear; but in broad terms, the red river hog occupies western and central Africa, and the bushpig occupies eastern and southern Africa. Where the two meet, they are sometimes said to interbreed, although other authorities dispute this. Although numerous subspecies have been identified in the past, none are currently recognised.

== Behaviour ==
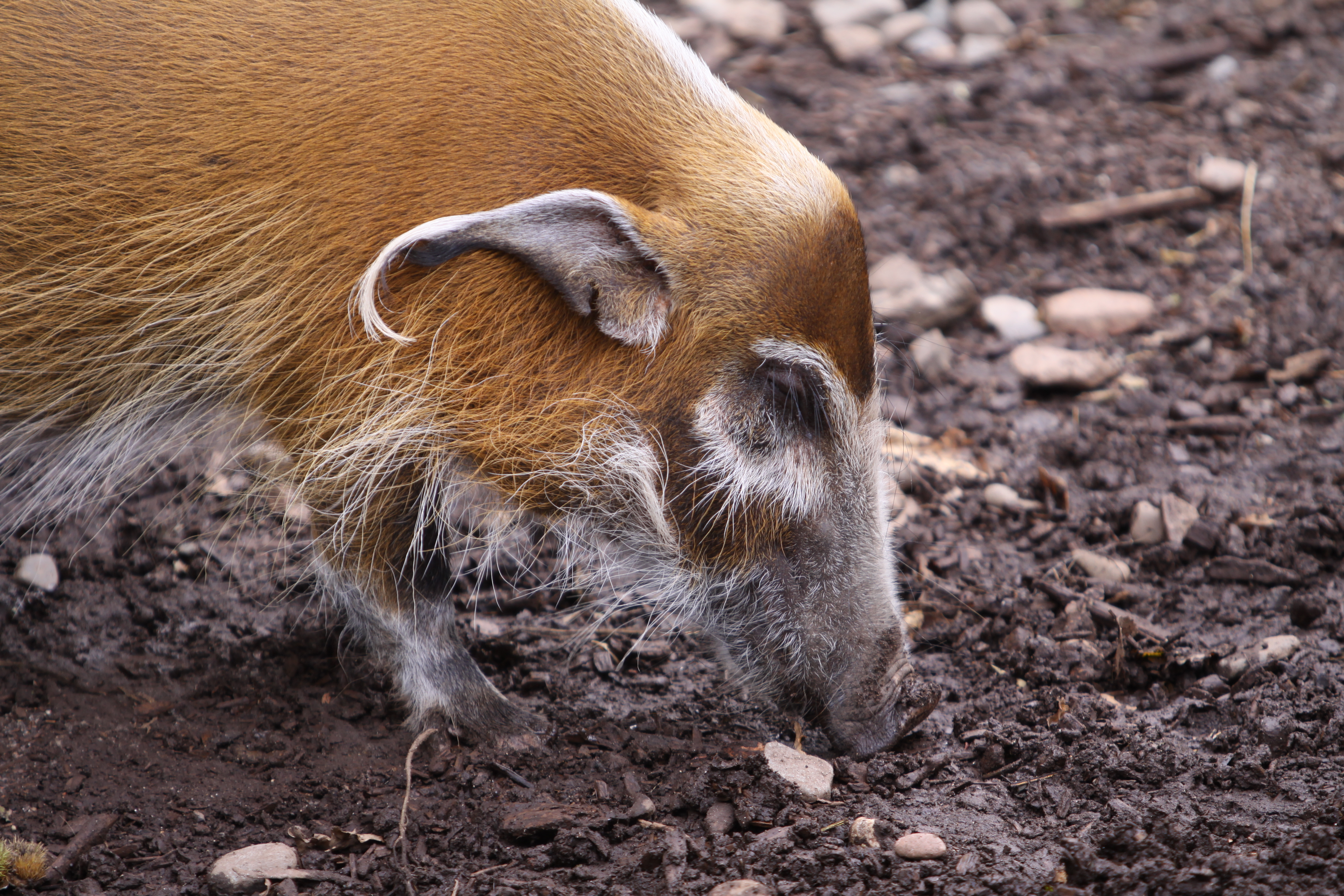
Red river hog at Durrell Wildlife Park (Jersey)

Red river hogs are often active during the day, but are primarily nocturnal or crepuscular. They typically live in small groups of approximately six to ten animals, composed of a single adult male and a number of adult females and their young. However, much larger groups, some with over 30 individuals, have been noted in particularly favourable habitats. The boar defends his harem aggressively against predators, with leopards being a particularly common threat.

They communicate almost continuously with grunts and squeals with a repertoire that can signal alarm, distress, or passive contact.

The species is omnivorous, eating mainly roots, bulbs, and tubers, and supplements its diet with fruit, seeds, nuts, water plants, grasses, herbs, fungi, eggs, dead animal and plant remains, insects, snails, lizards, other reptiles, and domestic animals such as piglets, goats, and sheep. It uses its large muzzle to snuffle about in the soil in search of food, as well as scraping the ground with its tusks and fore-feet. They can cause damage to agricultural crops, such as cassava and yams.

== Reproduction ==
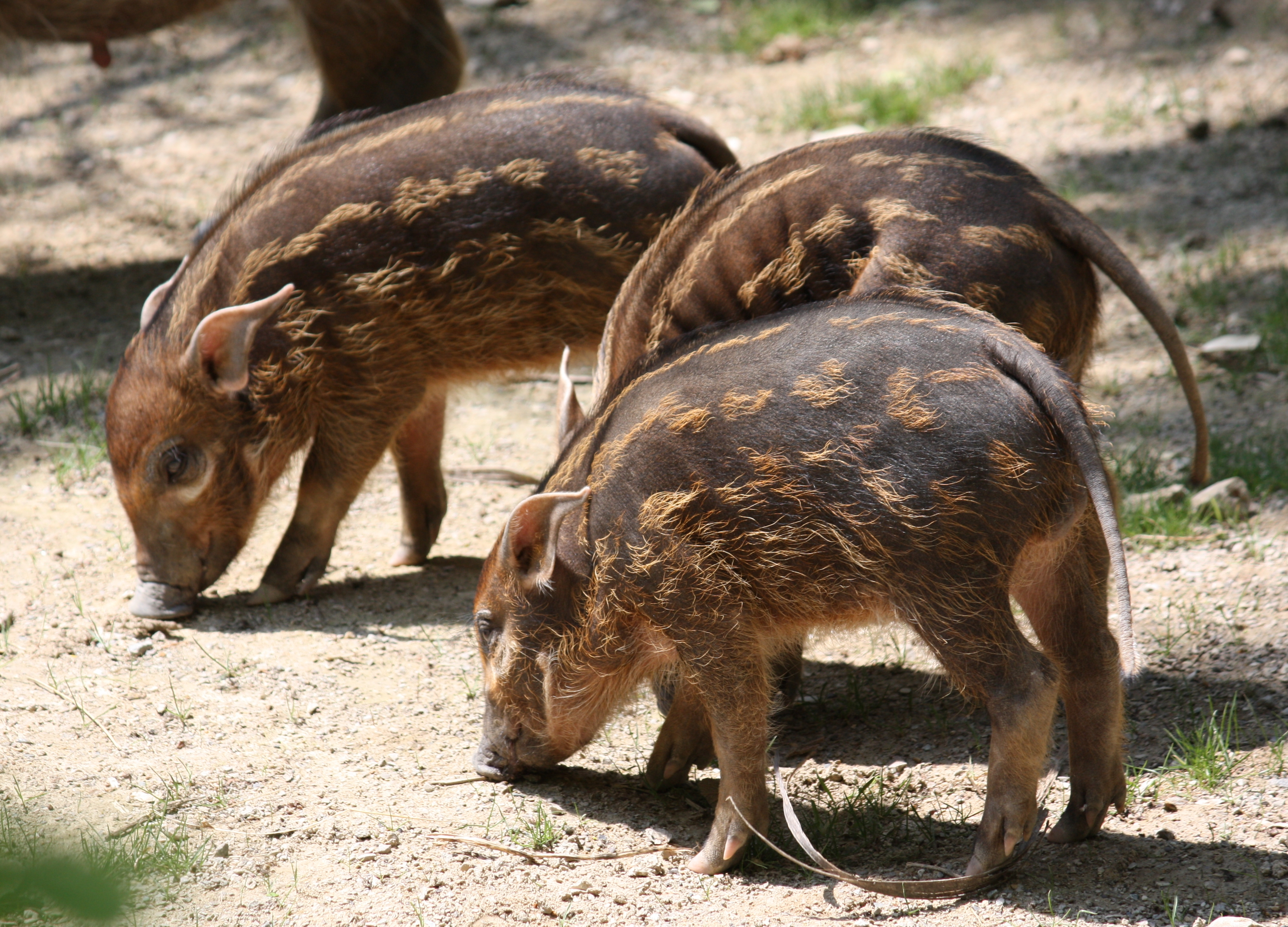
Piglets at the Cincinnati Zoo

Red river hogs breed seasonally, so that the young are born between the end of the dry season in February and the midpoint of the rainy season in July. The oestrus cycle lasts 34 to 37 days. The male licks the female's genital region before mating, which lasts about five to ten minutes. Gestation lasts 120 days.

The mother constructs a nest from dead leaves and dry grass before giving birth to a litter of up to six piglets, with three to four being most common. The piglets weigh 650 to 900 g (23 to 32 oz) at birth, and are initially dark brown with yellowish stripes and spots. They are weaned after about four months, and develop the plain reddish adult coat by about six months; the dark facial markings do not appear until they reach adulthood at about two years of age. They probably live for about fifteen years in the wild.
