= Nepoko River =

River in Democratic Republic of the Congo

- Location within Democratic Republic of the Congo

Location
- Country: Democratic Republic of the Congo

Physical characteristics
- Source
  - coordinates: 2.550°N 29.021°E
- Mouth: Aruwimi River
  - location: Africa
  - coordinates: 1.674662°N 27.007828°E
- Length: 537 km (334 mi)
- Basin size: 21,900 square kilometres (8,500 mi^{2})

The Nepoko River (French: Rivière Nepoko) is a river in the Democratic Republic of the Congo. It joins the Ituri River at the town of Bomili to form the Aruwimi River.

The river separates different groups of the Budu people of Wamba Territory, who speak different dialects on the western Ibambi side of the river and on the eastern Wamba side, although they consider themselves one people. The river divides the Catholic Diocese of Wamba into two. It runs through the Okapi Wildlife Reserve. Its southern tributaries include the Uala, Afande, Mambo and Ngaue rivers.

The explorer Wilhelm Junker reached the river on 6 May 1882. He described it as about a hundred yards wide at low water. The partly rocky banks, over thirty feet high, stood back to form flat margins fifty to sixty feet wide which were flooded at high water. In the colonial era a car ferry operated across the river, although not always during high or low water. It consisted of a number of dugout canoes lashed together sideways and covered with a wooden platform, and was pulled across the river by a cable.
