= Corneille Ewango =

Congolese environmentalist

- Occupation: Environmentalist
- Organization: Okapi Wildlife Reserve
- Notable work: Ewango delivered a TED lecture in 2007.
- Awards: Goldman Environmental Prize (2005)

Corneille E.N. Ewango is a Congolese environmentalist, and was responsible for the Okapi Faunal Reserve's botany program in the Democratic Republic of Congo from 1996 to 2003. He was awarded the Goldman Environmental Prize in 2005 for his efforts to protect the Okapi Wildlife Reserve in the Ituri Rainforest during the Congo Civil War. The reserve is home to the Mbuti people, and houses animals such as okapis (found nowhere else), elephants and 13 primate species. Ewango has uncovered 270 species of lianas and 600 tree species in the area.

== Early life and education ==
Ewango grew up in a family of soldiers, poachers, and fisherman, and spent his early years helping to support his family by collecting elephant tusks and the meat of animals killed by his father and uncle. Corneille wanted to attend university, and began poaching elephants to pay his way through school.

At first he wanted to become a medical doctor, so he could serve his village, where there was no modern health care. But after his application to study medicine was rejected three times, he began to study biology at the University of Kisangani, where he supplemented his studies with an internship with the Wildlife Conservation Society. At first his intention was just to mark time while waiting to study medicine. Within three years, however, he had become passionate about botany and conservation. He received a Bachelor of Science in 1995, and was employed as botanist and herbarium curator by the Centre de Formation et de Recherche en Conservation Forestière (CEFRECOF), adjacent to the Ituri Forest Reserve.

Ewango has recounted his growing interest in nature as follows: “Congo, my country, has the largest forest in Africa, maybe the second-largest in the world. I was born in a forest area, and when I was growing up I assisted my uncle, who was a poacher. That was good, because it grew my passion for protecting the forest and plants. When I went to university, I decided that I would like to do something related to plant ecology, because I felt that plants were so beautiful. When I am studying plants, I feel like I am talking with some kind of supernatural life, like I am talking with someone who does not speak.”

== Civil War ==
During the civil war in the Democratic Republic of the Congo from 1996 to 2003, Ewango was responsible for the botany program at the Okapi Wildlife Reserve. Over the course of the war, more and more senior staff members fled the reserve, until Ewango was the only senior staff member remaining. He stayed there throughout the conflict, hiding the reserve's rare herbarium collection, its computers, books, records, and other items in trees and protecting the animals and plants from vandals, poachers, and illegal miners and loggers.

“When the war blew up,” Ewango later explained, “my colleagues were leaving the area, but I said, my history is here. I felt like leaving would mean leaving everything, leaving my life and my work – the work I was doing was related to my life. So I said, I think I will stay and take care of the field team, and see what is going to happen with the herbarium. If I had gone somewhere, I wouldn't have gone to my homeland -- my homeland is here. I prefer to die here, prefer that people know what I died for.”

He risked his life by confronting military officials about the various illegal, anti-environmental activities in which soldiers were engaging. “I kindly explained that they were destroying everything, and told them that having a protected area was going to increase their reputation outside [the country],” he later explained. “Sometimes we became friends, but sometimes they continued their activities. What I could not understand was that they killed an elephant in the village, very close to the zoo. I was very angry – I said you are joking, what kind of liberation or democracy are you fighting for if you are without law, if you are destroying everything? I said, it's like you are killing your son and eating him, like you are not normal. They saw that I was strongly committed, and that I was serious.”

At one point he was obliged to escape into the forest for three months to save his life. With the help of locals, he managed to keep the fourteen okapi at the Ipulu Zoo alive. Despite the wartime challenges, moreover, he kept making discoveries, identifying no fewer than 600 new tree species and 270 new species of lianas (tropical vine plants).

Ewango later told the BBC that during the war “I was afraid but I didn't have a choice” other than to protect the reserve from “soldiers who knew nothing of conservation.” John Hart of the Wildlife Conservation Society affirmed that “If no-one had taken care of the reserve nothing would have been left.”

== Further education ==
When the Civil War ended in 2002, the reserve remained intact, to the astonishment of many. Partly as a result of Ewango's efforts, a number of poachers were arrested or exiled, and mining on the reserve was prohibited. In recognition of his service to the reserve, many of Ewango's international colleagues insisted that a way be found for him to continue his studies. Consequently, in August 2003 he was awarded a Christiansen Fund fellowship to study in the Department of Biology at the University of Missouri at St. Louis. He earned a master's degree in tropical botany there in 2006.

Dr. Patrick Osborne of the University of Missouri said that his department was “thrilled to have Corneille in our graduate program. He is an excellent scientist and dedicated conservationist—few people can legitimately claim that they have put their lives on the line for conservation, but Corneille is one of these people.”

Ewango later attended Wageningen University in the Netherlands, where he engaged in research about 300 different types of lianas and was awarded a doctoral degree in November 2010.

== Postwar career ==
Ewango is the director of the Okapi Wildlife Reserve. He also belongs to a group that was designated by the International Union for the Conservation of Nature to develop an ecosystem management plan for the Congo. In addition, he has worked on a publication called Flore d’Afrique Centrale (Plants (flora) of Central Africa). The herbarium he constructed at the Okapi Faunal Reserve has become a setting for training and research in tropical botany and conservation.

== Other professional activities ==
Ewango delivered a TED lecture in 2007

== Honors and awards ==
Ewango received the 2005 Goldman Environmental Prize at a ceremony held at the War Memorial Opera House in San Francisco on April 18, 2005. This prize, the world’s largest for grassroots environmentalists, was founded by Richard N. Goldman and Rhoda H. Goldman in 1989 and is presented annually to environmental heroes from each of six regions: Africa, Asia, Europe, Island Nations, North America and South/Central America. On winning the Goldman Prize, Ewango told the BBC, apropos of his efforts to save the reserve: “It's my contribution to advance science. Even if I die, I would be happy.”

After receiving the prize, Ewango was asked what he would do with the money. He said: “Though my country has the largest forest in Africa, it is one of the least known – we don't have so much research in botany in the Congo, except what we are doing. I hope to build a new herbarium for protected-area flora – I'm thinking that this prize is an opportunity to finish that herbarium. For a long time, we have been working in the shadows, but now we see it coming into the light.”

In 2011 Ewango won the Future for Nature Award, which recognizes outstanding international species protection efforts and includes a prize of €50,000 (about $73,000). The award was presented at the Future for Nature Foundation Conference at Burgers’ Zoo in Arnhem, The Netherlands, on April 5, 2011. Professor Frans Bongers of Wageningen University accepted the prize on behalf of Ewango, who for “administrative reasons” was unable to secure a visa to the Netherlands.
