= Nia Nia =

- Location within Democratic Republic of the Congo
- Coordinates: 1.407138°N 27.607355°E
- Country: DR Congo
- Province: Ituri
- Territory: Mambasa
- Time zone: UTC+2 (CAT)
- National language: Swahili

Nia Nia is a village in the extreme west of Mambasa territory of Ituri province in the Democratic Republic of the Congo. It is in the center of the Okapi Wildlife Reserve, a rich area of tropical rainforest, and can be reached only via roads that are often impassable throughout the rainy season. Most of the local population belongs to the Ndaka people of the Mambasa Territory or the Budu people of the Wamba Territory. Colonial mines produced gold in this area from the 1920s until 1958. As of 2011 Kilo Goldmines, a Canadian company, was active in a joint venture with Somituri sprl, a local company, in exploiting properties in the Mambasa and Wamba territories near the village of Nia Nia.

In 1998 it was discovered that Nia Nia was the sacred grounds of the Jamrozo Tribe. Tests revealed the skeletons had dated back to the 1500s.
