= Diocese of Wamba =

Roman Catholic diocese in the Democratic Republic of the Congo

Coordinates: 2.144239°N 27.992885°E

Diocese of Wamba Dioecesis Vambaensis

Location
- Country: Democratic Republic of the Congo
- Ecclesiastical province: Kisangani
- Metropolitan: Kisangani

Statistics
- Area: 68,000 km^{2} (26,000 sq mi)
- Population: Total; Catholics: (as of 2004); 512,213; 171,230 (33.4%)

Information
- Rite: Latin Rite
- Cathedral: Saint Joseph de Wamba
- Secular priests: 42

Current leadership
- Pope: Leo XIV
- Bishop: Emmanuel Ngona Ngotsi, M. Afr.
- Bishops emeritus: Janvier Kataka Luvete

The Roman Catholic Diocese of Wamba (Latin: Vambaën(sis)) is a diocese located in the city of Wamba in the ecclesiastical province of Kisangani in the Democratic Republic of the Congo. Apparently, during the tenure of Bishop Kataka Lucete, there were 18 parishes and 42 diocesan priests.

== Location ==
The diocese covers 68,000 square kilometres (26,000 sq mi). It has a population of about 600,000 inhabitants. Of these, an estimated 40,000 are pygmies. The diocese is bisected by the Nepoko River. This river separates different groups of the Budu people of Wamba Territory, who speak different dialects on the western Ibambi side of the river and on the eastern Wamba side, although they consider themselves one people.

== History ==
Key events in the history of the diocese:

- 10 March 1949: Established as Apostolic Vicariate of Wamba from the Apostolic Vicariate of Stanley Falls
- 10 November 1959: Promoted as Diocese of Wamba

== Leadership ==
=== Ordinaries, in reverse chronological order ===
- Bishops of Wamba (Latin Rite), below
  - Bishop Emmanuel Ngona Ngotsi M. Afr. (since 17 January 2024)
  - Bishop Janvier Kataka Luvete (11 August 1996 - 17 January 2024)
  - Bishop Charles Kambale Mbogha, A.A. (11 June 1990 – 12 June 1995), appointed Bishop of Isiro-Niangara
  - Bishop Gustave Olombe Atelumbu Musilamu (5 September 1968 – 6 November 1990)
  - Bishop Joseph Wittebols, S.C.I. (10 November 1959 – 26 November 1964); see below
- Vicar Apostolic of Wamba (Latin Rite), below
  - Bishop Joseph-Pierre-Albert Wittebols, S.C.I. (10 March 1949 – 11 October 1959); see above

== See also ==
- Roman Catholicism in the Democratic Republic of the Congo
