= Budu people =

Regions with significant populations
- Ituri Forest, Democratic Republic of the Congo: 350,000

Languages
- Budu language, French

The Budu people (Babudu) are a Bantu people living in the Wamba Territory in the Orientale Province of the Democratic Republic of the Congo. They speak the Budu language.

== Location ==
The Budu people live on both sides of the Nepoko River, speaking different dialects. However, the people of the Ibambi side of the river and those of the Wamba side consider themselves one people. The Budu territory is within tropical rain forest. It is isolated, with roads inaccessible to vehicles other than bicycles.

== Economy ==
The Budu people mainly live by subsistence agriculture, growing cassava, yams, corn, rice, peanuts, plantains and pulses. Palm oil is the main cash crop, giving an income per capita of about $120 a year. Animal husbandry is rare, limited to poultry and some goats. They obtain meat and other forest resources through trade with the Mbuti people (Pygmies), who share their language. The people wear loin cloths made from beaten bark, or second-hand western clothes. They live in square huts with mud walls, thatched with palm leaves.

== Culture ==
The family organization is patriarchal. Important decisions are made by a consensus of elders. Both the Catholic church and, later WEC International (Worldwide Evangelisation for Christ), have been active with the Budu. Charles Studd, founder of WEC, died in Budu territory and is buried in Ibambi.
