= Anne Eisner Putnam =

American painter

Anne Eisner Putnam (1911–1967) was an abstract and landscape painter, watercolorist, and collector of African art, originally from New York where she also died. She became a writer, best known for her book Madami: My Eight Years of Adventure with the Congo Pygmies. This was an account of her time and experiences in the Belgian Congo.

She and her husband, Patrick Tracy Lowell Putnam (1904-1953) met in the USA in 1945 and lived together on Martha's Vineyard and in New York City. They later moved to Africa and later married on July 28, 1948 in Léopoldville (now Kinshasa), in the Belgian Congo, what is now known as the Democratic Republic of the Congo. Her husband was a Harvard graduate and student of anthropology who, beginning in the 1930s, established what became known as Camp Putnam along the Epulu River in the Belgian Congo. Camp Putnam was on the edge of the Ituri rainforest of the Belgian Congo, near the home of the pygmies. They ran Camp Putnam for paying tourists, a hotel giving an African experience. At the same time, they also ran a medical clinic and offered legal aid to local people. Among the Putnams’ many outsiders, both tourists and researchers, was anthropologist Colin Turnbull who later authored The Forest People about The Mbuti Pygmies: Change and Adaptation.

During their years at Camp Putnam, they spent years studying and documenting the pygmies. While there, they collected many African artifacts including masks. Many of these artifacts they collected later became part of the collection of the American Museum of Natural History in New York City. Patrick Putnam died at age 49, in 1953. Anne stayed on running Camp Putnam for some years. She returned to live in New York in 1958 and Camp Putnam was closed. She died of cancer in New York City in 1967 and was buried in Ferncliff Cemetery, Hartsdale, NY.

== Painting career ==
In New York she continued her painting career, writing and lecturing on her experiences in the Congo. She was also one of the founders of the Federation of Modern Painters and Sculptors in 1940.

- 1941 Jan. Won Marcia Brady Tucker Prize from The National Association of Women Painters and Sculptors for her painting "Washington Square."
- 1962. Received F. Weber Co. Prize from the National Association of Women Artists.
- 1965. Received the Jane C. Stanley Memorial Prize for Watercolor from the National Association of Women Artists.

== Anne Putnam Eisner’s writings ==
- Putnam, Anne Eisner. Madami: My Eight Years of Adventure with the Congo Pygmies. New York: Prentice Hall, 1954.
- Putnam, Anne Eisner. "My Life with Africa's Littlest People," The National Geographic Magazine Feb. 1960.

== Bibliography ==
- Mark, Joan T. 1995. King of the world in the land of the pygmies. University of Nebraska Press: Lincoln.
- McDonald, Christie. 2004. Ethnography, Literature, and Art in the Work of Anne Eisner (Putnam): Making Sense of Colonial Life in the Ituri Forest. Research in African Literatures Vol. 35, No. 4: pp. 1–16.
- McDonald, Christie, ed. 2005. Images of Congo: Anne Eisner Art and Ethnography, 1946–1958. Milan: 5 Continents. ISBN 88-7439-220-6, cloth.
- Lawal, Babatunde. 2008. In Word and Image: Remembering Anne Eisner's Adventures in Africa. Research in African Literatures 39.2: 138-142.
- Mustafa, Hudita Nura. 2008. Art, Ethnography, and Anne Eisner's "Images of Congo". Transition No. 98 pp. 136–149.
- McDonald, Christie. 2020. The Life and Art of Anne Eisner: An American Artist between Cultures. Rome: Officina Libraria. ISBN 978-88-3367-100-0, cloth.
