= Epulu River =

Tributary of the Congo River

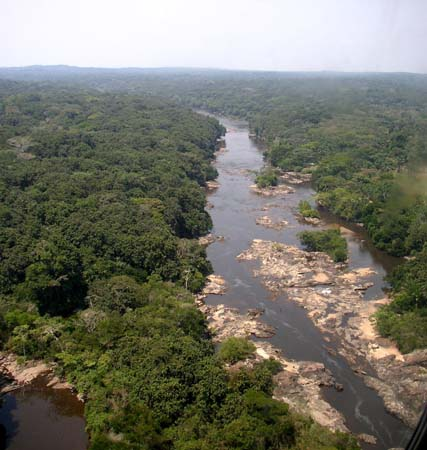

The Epulu River is a tributary of the Aruwimi River, located in the Ituri Province of the Democratic Republic of the Congo, running for 130 kilometers and concluding at the Arabia Falls nearby the river's mouth. The river flows through the Okapi Wildlife Reserve, designated as a World Heritage Site by UNESCO in 1996. Its banks are inhabited traditionally by the pygmy Mbuti and Efé peoples. Along the river's banks are situated the headquarters of the Okapi Conservation Project, serving as its hub for protecting the okapi and local biodiversity.

== See also ==
- Congo River
