= Janvier Kataka Luvete =

Congolese Catholic prelate (born 1947)

The Most Reverend Janvier Kataka Luvete
- Bishop Emeritus of Wamba, Democratic Republic of the Congo
- Church: Catholic Church
- Archdiocese: Roman Catholic Archdiocese of Kisangani
- See: Roman Catholic Diocese of Wamba
- Appointed: 8 November 1996
- Installed: 14 June 1997
- Term ended: 17 January 2024
- Predecessor: Charles Kambale Mbogha
- Successor: Emmanuel Ngona Ngotsi
- Other post: Apostolic Administrator of Diocese of Wamba (17 January 2024 - 3 August 2024)

Orders
- Ordination: 18 August 1974
- Consecration: 14 June 1997 by Cardinal Jozef Tomko
- Rank: Bishop

Personal details
- Born: Janvier Kataka Luvete; 4 April 1947 (age 79) Ngunda, North-Western Province, Zambia

Styles of Janvier Kataka Luvete
- Reference style: Your Lordship; The Most Reverend
- Spoken style: His Lordship
- Religious style: Bishop

Janvier Kataka Luvete (born 4 April 1947) is a Congolese Catholic prelate who was the bishop of the Roman Catholic Diocese of Wamba in the Democratic Republic of the Congo from 8 November 1996 until his age-related retirement on 17 January 2024. Before that, from 18 August 1974 until he was appointed bishop, he was a priest of that same Roman Catholic diocese. He was appointed bishop on 8 November 1996 by Pope John Paul II. He was consecrated and installed at Wamba, Democratic Republic of the Congo on 14 June 1997. His retirement request was accepted by Pope Francis and took effect on 17 January 2024. While in retirement, he served as Apostolic Administrator of the Diocese of Wamba from 17 January 2024 until 3 August 2024.

== Background and priesthood ==
Janvier Kataka Luvete was born in Ngunda, North-Western Province, Zambia on 4 April 1947. He studied philosophy and theology at seminary. He was ordained a priest on 18 August 1974. He worked as a priest until 8 November 1996.

== Bishop ==
On 8 November 1996, The Holy Father Pope John Paul II appointed him bishop of the diocese of Wamba. He was consecrated as bishop on 14 June 1997 in Rome, Italy by the hands of Cardinal Jozef Tomko, Cardinal-Priest of Santa Sabina, assisted by Archbishop Faustino Sainz Muñoz, Titular Archbishop of Novaliciana and Archbishop Emmanuel Kataliko, Archbishop of Bukavu. He served there as the local ordinary under difficult security and political conditions.

On 17 January 2024, The Holy Father accepted the age-related resignation of Bishop Janvier Kataka Luvete from the pastoral care of the Diocese of Wamba in the DR Congo. Pope Francis appointed Father Emmanuel Ngona Ngotsi M.Afr. as the new local ordinary at Wamba. Bishop Kataka Luvete stayed on at Wamba as apostolic administrator until 3 August 2024.

== See also ==
- Catholic Church in the Democratic Republic of the Congo

== Succession table ==
| Preceded by Charles Kambale Mbogha (11 June 1990 - 6 December 1995) | Bishop of Wamba (8 November 1996 - 17 Jan 2024) | Succeeded by Emmanuel Ngona Ngotsi (since 17 January 2024) |
