= Gustave Olombe Atelumbu Musilamu =

Gustave Olombe Atelumbu Musilamu (May 1, 1927, Yaounge – February 17, 2011, Wamba, Congo Democratic Republic) was the Catholic bishop of the Diocese of Wamba, in the Democratic Republic of the Congo.

Ordained to the priesthood in 1957, Olombe Atelumbu Musilamu was appointed bishop of the Wamba Diocese in 1968 resigning in 1990.

Bishop Musilamu died on February 17, 2011, at the age of 83.
