= Emmanuel Ngona Ngotsi =

Congolese Catholic prelate (born 1960)

The Most Reverend Emmanuel Ngona Ngotsi
- Bishop of Wamba, Democratic Republic of the Congo
- Church: Catholic Church
- Archdiocese: Roman Catholic Archdiocese of Kisangani
- See: Roman Catholic Diocese of Wamba
- Appointed: 17 January 2024
- Installed: 15 September 2024
- Predecessor: Janvier Kataka Luvete
- Successor: Incumbent

Orders
- Ordination: 22 August 1990
- Consecration: 15 September 2024 by Cardinal Fridolin Ambongo Besungu
- Rank: Bishop

Personal details
- Born: Emmanuel Ngona Ngotsi; 1 January 1960 (age 66) Bambu-Mines, Diocese of Bunia, Ituri Province, DR Congo

Styles of Emmanuel Ngona Ngotsi
- Reference style: Your Lordship; The Most Reverend
- Spoken style: His Lordship
- Religious style: Bishop

Emmanuel Ngona Ngotsi M. Afr. (born 1 January 1960) is a Congolese Catholic prelate who is the Bishop of the Roman Catholic Diocese of Wamba in the Democratic Republic of the Congo since 17 January 2024. Before that, from 22 August 1990 until he was appointed bishop, he was a priest of the Missionaries of Africa M. Afr. (White Fathers). He was appointed bishop on 17 January 2024 by Pope Francis. He was consecrated as bishop at Kinshasa on 15 September 2024 by Cardinal Fridolin Ambongo Besungu, Archbishop of Kinshasa.

== Background and education ==
He was born on 1 January 1960 at Bambu-Mines, Diocese of Bunia, Ituri Province, DR Congo. He studied in Bambu-Mines for both his elementary school (1965 until 1972) and secondary school education (1972 until 1978). He became a member of the Order of the Missionaries of Africa, abbreviated (M. Afr.). He studied philosophy at Bambu-Mines. He studied for one year as an intern in Burkina Faso. He then studied theology at the Catholic Institute of Toulouse, France. He holds a Master's degree in social sciences, awarded by the Catholic University of Paris, where he studied from 1996 until 1999.

== Priest ==
He took his perpetual vows as a member of the White Fathers while in seminary. On 22 August 1990, he was ordained a priest of that religious order. He served as a priest until 17 January 2024.

While a priest, he served in various roles including as:

- Parish Vicar of Birni N'koni Parish in Niger, from 1990 until 1994.
- Parish priest of Birni N'koni Parish in Niger, from 1994 until 1996.
- Parish priest in Zinder, Niger from 1999 until 2004.
- Delegate to the General Chapter of the Missionaries of Africa, in Rome in 2004.
- Provincial Assistant in Ouagadougou, Burkina Faso from 2005 until 2008. (Covering Burkina Faso, Togo, Ivory Coast and Niger)
- Rector of the philosophical seminary of the White Fathers in Ouagadougou from 2008 until 2009.
- Provincial Director in Bukavu, Democratic Republic of the Congo from 2009 until 2010. (Covering DR Congo, Rwanda and Burundi)
- Member of the General Council of the Missionaries of Africa in Rome from 2010 until 2016.
- Provincial Superior of the Missionaries of Africa in Bukavu, Democratic Republic of the Congo from 2017 until 2023.
- Member of the Presbyteral Council of the Archdiocese of Bukavu from 2017 until 2023.
- Member of the College of Consultors of Bukavu since from 2017 until 2023.

== As bishop ==
On 17 January 2024 Pope Francis appointed him Bishop of the Roman Catholic Diocese of Wamba, DR Congo. He was consecrated at Kinshasa on 15 September 2024 by the hands of Cardinal Fridolin Ambongo Besungu, Archbishop of Kinshasa assisted by Archbishop Mitja Leskovar, Titular Archbishop of Beneventum and Archbishop Marcel Utembi Tapa, Archbishop of Kisangani.

== See also ==
- Catholic Church in the Democratic Republic of the Congo

== Succession table ==
Catholic Church titles
Preceded by Janvier Kataka Luvete (8 November 1996 - 17 Jan 2024)	Bishop of Wamba (since 17 January 2024)	Succeeded by Incumbent
