= Ituri River =

River in Democratic Republic of the Congo

Ituri River Rivière Ituri
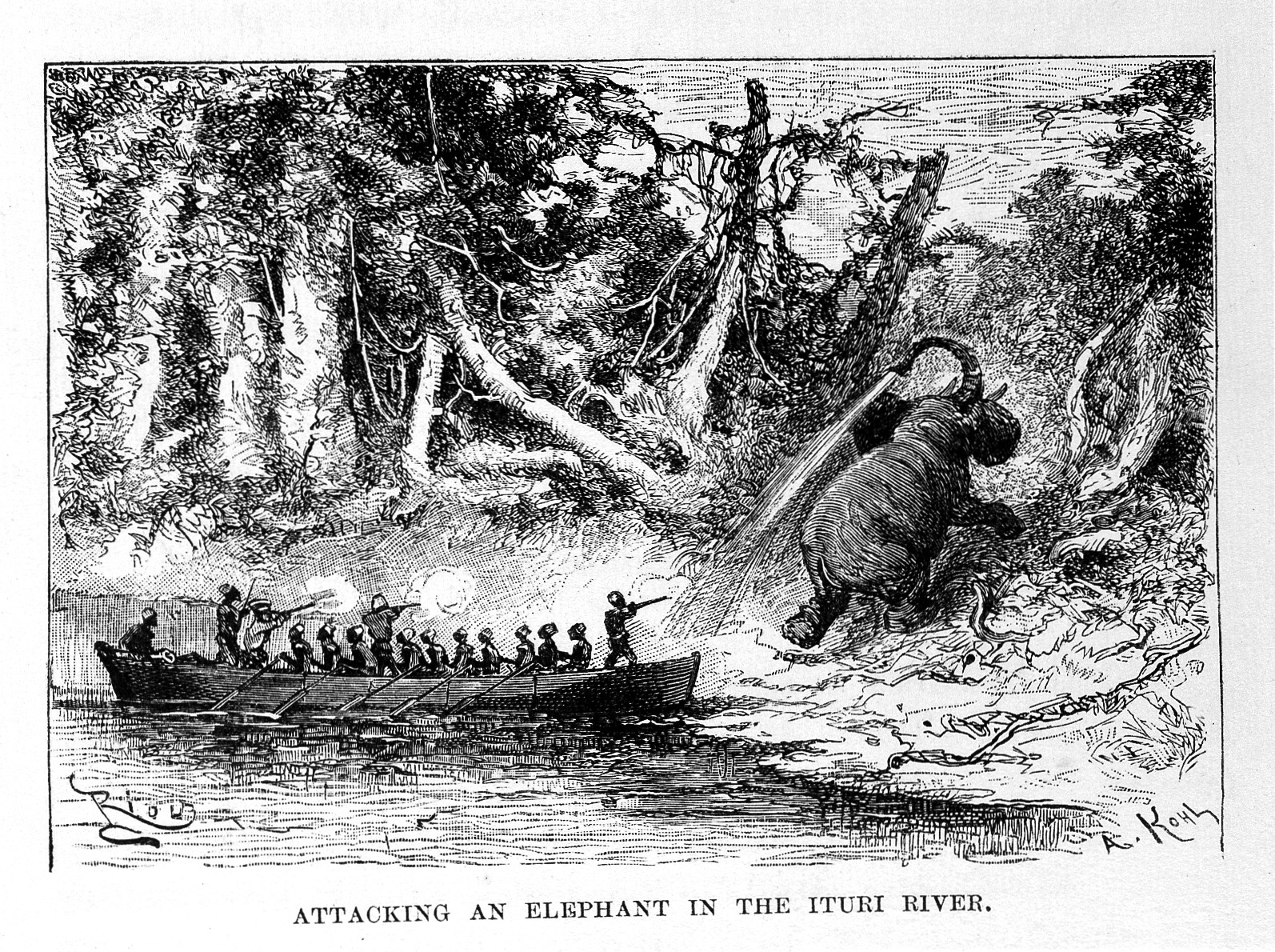
- Attacking an elephant in the Ituri River. From Henry Morton Stanley's In Darkest Africa (1890)

- Location within Democratic Republic of the Congo

Location
- Country: Democratic Republic of the Congo

Physical characteristics
- Mouth: Aruwimi River
  - location: Bomili
  - coordinates: 1.665562°N 27.010249°E
- Length: 650 kilometres (400 mi)

- The Ituri River (French: Rivière Ituri) is a river of the Democratic Republic of the Congo. It is the main tributary of the Aruwimi River, which forms where the Ituri meets the Nepoko River.
- It gives its name to Ituri Province.

== Course ==
- The Ituri has its headwaters in province of Haut-Uélé in the mountains to the west of Lake Albert, about 15 kilometres (9.3 mi) north of Kaladau.
- It flows generally south into Ituri province, and flows past Mongbwalu to the east.
- It is joined from the left by Shari River to the northeast of Irumu about 45 kilometres (28 mi) south-southwest of Bunia.
- It is joined from the left by the Malibongo River near Komanda Helipad.
- From there it flows in a generally westward direction to Bomili in Tshopo province, where it is joined by the Nepoko River to form the Aruwimi.
- The Ituri is 650 kilometres (400 mi) long. The Aruwimi is 380 kilometres (240 mi) long, giving a combined length of 1,030 kilometres (640 mi).
- The river flows through the 63,000 square kilometres (24,000 sq mi) Ituri Rainforest.
- About one-fifth of the rainforest is made up of the Okapi Wildlife Reserve, a World Heritage Site.

== History ==
- In 1903 prospectors working for the Congo Free State discovered gold in the Ituri River.
- This led to the opening of the Kilo mine in 1905 and the Moto mine in 1911, and in 1919 to creation of the Régie Industrielle des Mines de Kilo-Moto.

== Sources ==
- Shakespeare, Howard (June 1993), "KILO MOTO", Scripophily, archived from the original on 2012-04-25
- Van den Bossche, J.-P.; Bernacsek, G.M. (1990), Source Book for the Inland Fishery Resources of Africa, vol. 1, Rome: Food and Agriculture Organization of the United Nations, ISBN 9789251029831
- "Way: Ituri (776262086)", OpenStreetMap
- Wilkie, David. S. (1987), Impact of Swidden Age and Subsistence Hunting on Diversity and Abundance of Exploited Fauna in the Ituri Forest of Northeastern Zaire (Unpublished Ph.D. dissertation), Department of Forestry and Wildlife Management, University of Massachusetts
