= Okapi Conservation Project =

Non-profit organization

- Founded: 1987
- Founder: John Lukas
- Type: Non-profit organization
- Purpose: Okapi conservation
- Location: Democratic Republic of Congo
- Region served: Ituri Forest
- Website: www.okapiconservation.org

The Okapi Conservation Project (OCP) was founded in 1987 for the protection of the okapis (Okapia johnstoni) and their habitat. Okapis are found only in the Democratic Republic of Congo and are seen as the major flagship species of the Ituri Forest. The OCP has about one hundred staff members and one hundred and ten government rangers under the direction of the Institute in Congo for the Conservation of Nature. The Okapi Conservation Project is partnered with the Wildlife Conservation Network. OCP's founder John Lukas is also a founding member of the Wildlife Conservation Network. In 1992 the project helped create the Okapi Wildlife Reserve, encompassing 13,700 square kilometers of the Ituri Forest, which was designated as a United Nations World Heritage Site in 1996.

== 2012 attack ==
In June 2012 the headquarters for the Okapi Wildlife Reserve was taken over by poachers, intent on retaliating against the staff who had been stopping their elephant poaching and mining operations. Six guards and other staff as well as 14 okapis were killed in the incident. The local village was looted, women were raped and the conservation center was burned down.

== Programs ==
=== Okapi Wildlife Reserve ===
The Okapi Wildlife Reserve – an area 13,700 square kilometres (5,300 sq mi), about one-fifth of the Ituri Forest – was created with the help of the Okapi Wildlife Project in 1992. The project continues to support the reserve by training and equipping wildlife guards and by providing assistance to improve the lives of neighboring communities. The Okapi Wildlife Reserve was added to the list of World Heritage Sites in 1996, and since 1997 it has been listed as a World Heritage Site in danger.

=== Agro-forestry ===
The program provides farmers with resources to make their farmland more productive, thus decreasing farmers' need for forest land. The program also works to reforest unused areas.

=== Conservation education and community assistance ===
OCP offers an education team that travels throughout the Okapi Wildlife Reserve, providing workshops, lectures, and presentations on the importance of biodiversity conservation and sustainable management of forest resources. The team also distributes educational materials to all of the twenty-three schools in the Okapi Wildlife Reserve. They also assist in school construction.

=== Other projects ===
Other projects include finding alternatives to hunting bush meat, such as raising tilapia and cane rats. Another activity is providing air surveillance and wildlife guard response to stop illegal activities in the reserve.

== See also ==
- Conservation movement
