= Blue Mountains (Congo) =

Mountain range in northeastern Democratic Republic of the Congo

Coordinates: 1.5°N 30.5°E

The Blue Mountains (French: Monts Bleus) are a mountain range located in the northeastern Ituri Province of the Democratic Republic of the Congo. To the east the range overlooks Lake Albert, at the confluence of the Victoria Nile and Albert Nile, which form part of the border with Uganda. The western slopes of the Blue Mountains give rise to the Ituri River, a tributary of the Congo River. They reach heights of up to 2,000 meters.
