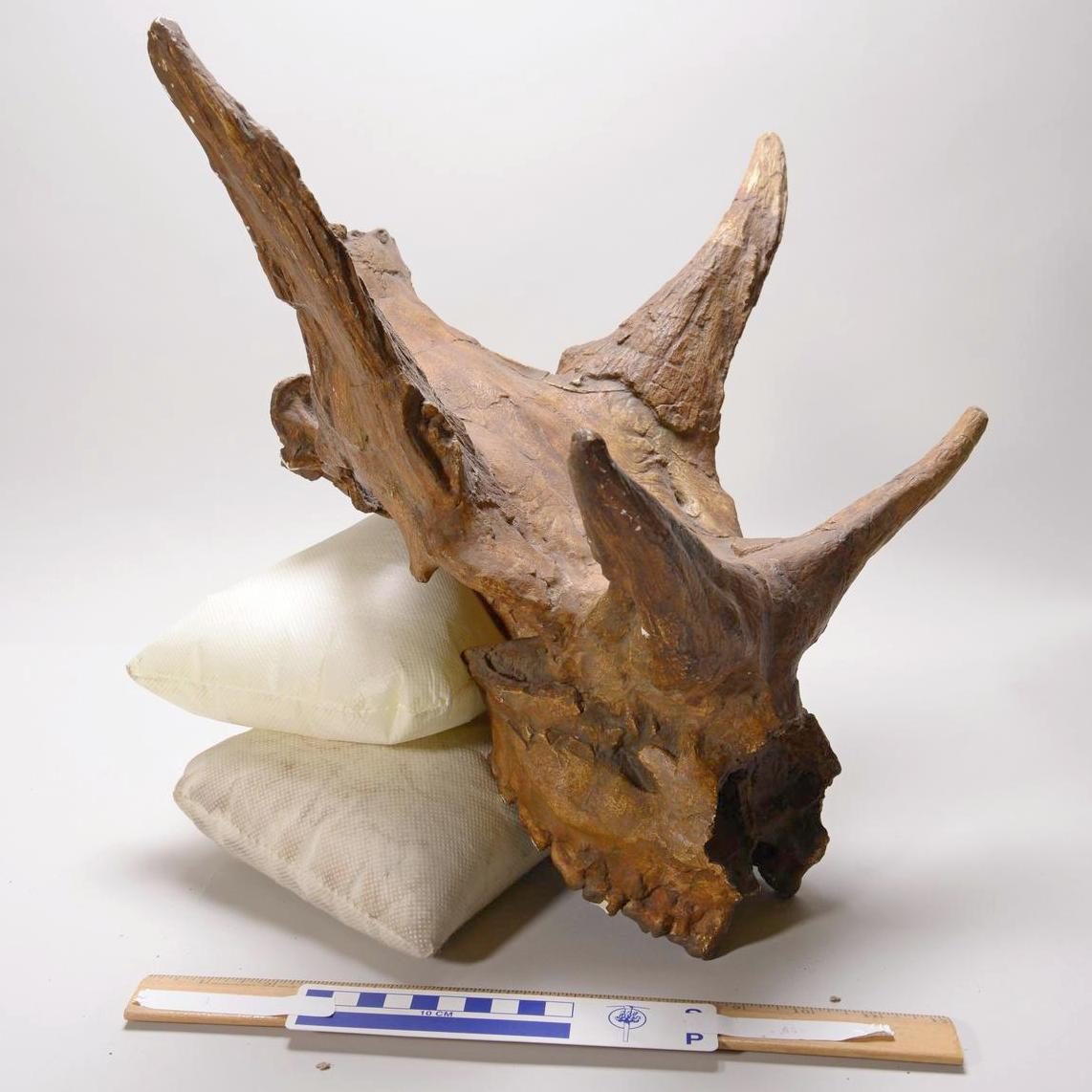
- Skull of G. punjabiensis (YPM VP 013943)

Scientific classification
- Kingdom: Animalia
- Phylum: Chordata
- Class: Mammalia
- Order: Artiodactyla
- Family: Giraffidae
- Genus: †Giraffokeryx; Pilgrim 1910

Type species
- †Giraffokeryx punjabiensis Pilgrim, 1910

Species
- G. punjabiensis Pilgrim 1910; G. anatoliensis Geraads & Aslan 2003

= Giraffokeryx =

Giraffokeryx Temporal range: Miocene, 14–11 Ma

Extinct genus of giraffe-like animals

Giraffokeryx is an extinct genus of medium-sized giraffids known from the Miocene of the Sivalik Hills of India, Pakistan and Nepal, though it is also known from Türkiye. It is distinguished from other giraffids by the four ossicones on its head; one pair in front of the eyes on the anterior aspect of the frontal bone and the other behind the eyes in the frontoparietal region overhanging the temporal fossae. It has a brachydont dentition like in other giraffids and its legs and feet are of medium length. Giraffokeryx is considered monotypic by most authors, in the form of G. punjabiensis, but other species have been assigned to the genus:

- G. chinjensis was assigned to the genus, but later included within the extinct species Giraffa priscilla. The distribution of this latter species and G. punjabiensis indicates that the Himalayas still did not act as a barrier for faunal dispersal during the middle Miocene.
- G. anatoliensis, a partial skull with a postorbital horn and isolated teeth from Turkey, had shorter and less inclined horns than G. punjabiensis.

Giraffokeryx resembled either an okapi or a small giraffe. It is a possible ancestor of both.

== Palaeoecology ==
Dental mesowear analysis shows that G. punjabiensis was a browsing herbivore.
