= Okapi Wildlife Reserve =

World Heritage Site

- IUCN category II (national park)
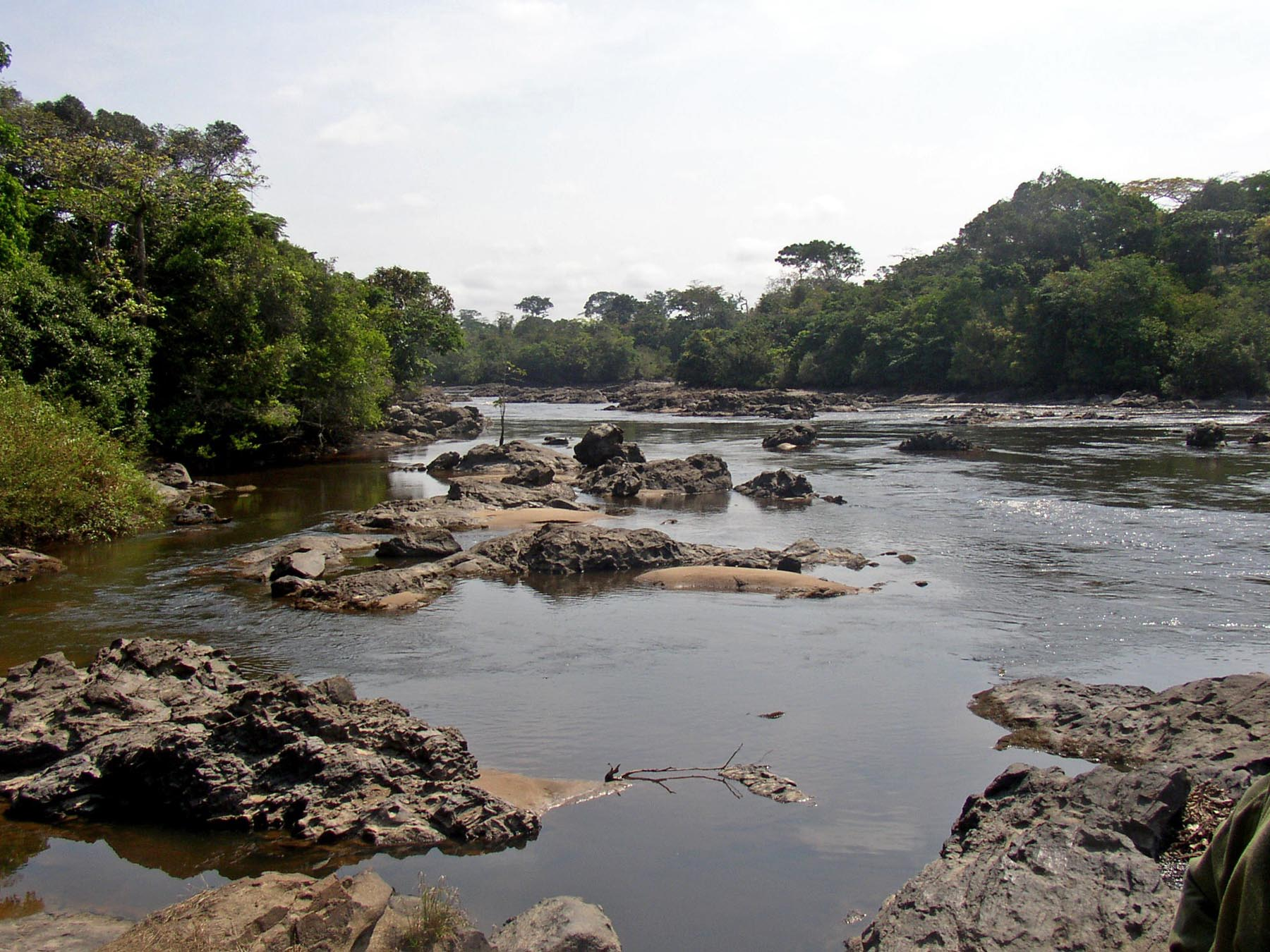
- Epulu River in the Okapi Wildlife Reserve

- Location within Democratic Republic of the Congo
- Location: Democratic Republic of the Congo
- Nearest city: Isiro
- Coordinates: 02°00′00″N 28°30′00″E
- Area: 13,726.25 km^{2} (5,299.73 sq mi)
- Established: 1992
- Governing body: Institut Congolais pour la Conservation de la Nature

UNESCO World Heritage Site
- Criteria: Natural: x
- Reference: 718
- Inscription: 1996 (20th Session)
- Endangered: 1997 -

The Okapi Wildlife Reserve (French: Réserve de faune à okapis) is a wildlife reserve in the Ituri Forest in the north-east of the Democratic Republic of the Congo, near the borders with South Sudan and Uganda. At approximately 14,000 km^{2}, it covers approximately one-fifth of the area of the forest. In 1996, the Okapi Wildlife Reserve was designated a UNESCO World Heritage Site, due to its large population of endangered okapis and its high overall biodiversity. As of March 2026, the reserve is occupied and seriously threatened by the presence of Islamist terrorists from the Allied Democratic Forces who in 2025 killed more than 1700 civilians in the wider region of northeast Congo.

== Ecology ==
The wildlife reserve makes up roughly one-fifth of the total area of the Ituri Forest. As a Pleistocene refugium, the forest contains dense evergreen and semi-evergreen forests, dominated by Mbau trees (Gilbertiodendron dewevrei). The Nepoko, Ituri, and Epulu rivers flow through the reserve, surrounded by swamp forests. Granite outcrops in the north of the reserve protect critical habitat for Encephalartos ituriensis, a threatened species of cycad.

Because of its relatively stable climate during the repeated ice ages, the wildlife reserve, and the Ituri Forest as a whole, protects a unique biological community. As its name implies, the Okapi Wildlife Reserve is home to many okapis. As of 1996, the number was estimated at 3900–6350, out of a global population of around 10,000–20,000. In 1996, there were roughly 7,500 elephants and 7,500 chimpanzees within the reserve, although those numbers have likely declined significantly in recent years due to poaching and political instability.

Other mammals identified within the reserve include the leopard, forest buffalo, water chevrotain, bongo, Bates's pygmy antelope, and giant forest hog. The Ituri Forest is home to 17 primate species, the most of any African forest.

The reserve has over 370 species of bird, and is one of the most important sites for bird conservation in mainland Africa. Many of the bird species found in the reserve are endemic to the Congo Basin, including the endangered Congo peafowl.

The imposing Mbiya Mountain overlooks the Epulu village, and nomadic Mbuti pygmies and Bantu farmers also live within the reserve.

== History ==
The Okapi Wildlife Reserve was created with the help of the Okapi Conservation Project in 1992. The project continues to support the reserve by training and equipping wildlife guards and by providing assistance to improve the lives of neighboring communities. The Okapi Wildlife Reserve was added to the list of World Heritage Sites in danger in 1997. Threats include the deforestation caused by slash and burn agriculture, and commercial hunting for the sale of bushmeat. Gold mining has also been problematic. As of 2005, the fighting in the eastern part of the country entered the reserve, causing its staff to flee or be evacuated. Lack of funding due to the poor political and economic conditions of the Democratic Republic of the Congo has also been problematic. It is hoped that eco-tourism to the area can be developed, leading to both increased funding and improved public awareness.

== Conservation ==
The wildlife reserve is home to the Epulu Conservation and Research Center on the Epulu River. This facility dates back to 1928 when the camp was founded by American anthropologist Patrick Putnam as a capture station, where wild okapis were captured before being sent to American and European zoos. Until 2012 it remained a capture station, though it no longer exports okapis. In 2012 a rebel attack killed the facility's captive okapis. Consequently, it chose to prioritize focus exclusively on preserving the wild okapis in the reserve, pending the cessation of hostilities. The center conducts much important research and conservation work.

== Gold mining ==
As of 2015 there was a gold artisanal mining camp at Muchacha within the reserve employing about 8,000 people. The mine was run by a loosely organized rebel faction, Mai-Mai Simba, who aimed to liberate the local population from the reserve's land use restrictions. The warden of the reserve, Colonel Lucien Gedeon Lokumu announced operation Safisha to clear the reserve of rebel forces and mining operations.

A June 2021 report from the United Nations Group of Experts on the Democratic Republic of the Congo raised concerns about the presence of semi-industrialized dredging operations within the reserve, operating 12 kilometers south of Bandegaido. Mining took place within the Muchacha Ming Complex (MMC) which held a permit from the official DRC Mining Cadastre, held by the Chinese businessman Kong Maohuai's MCC Resources. The company Kimia Mining Investment Sarl was operating at the mine. Mining is illegal in the reserve, and FARDC troops were guarding the mining site illegally.

Later that month, Congolese authorities announced the seizure of 31 kg of gold (about $1.9 million) from this Muchaha mine. As of 2022, non-governmental organizations such as the Council for Environmental Defense through Legality and Traceability (CODELT) and Alerte Congolaise pour l'Environnement et les Droits de l'Homme (ACEDH) blame mining operations for destroying pristine rainforest within the reserve.

== Rebel attacks ==
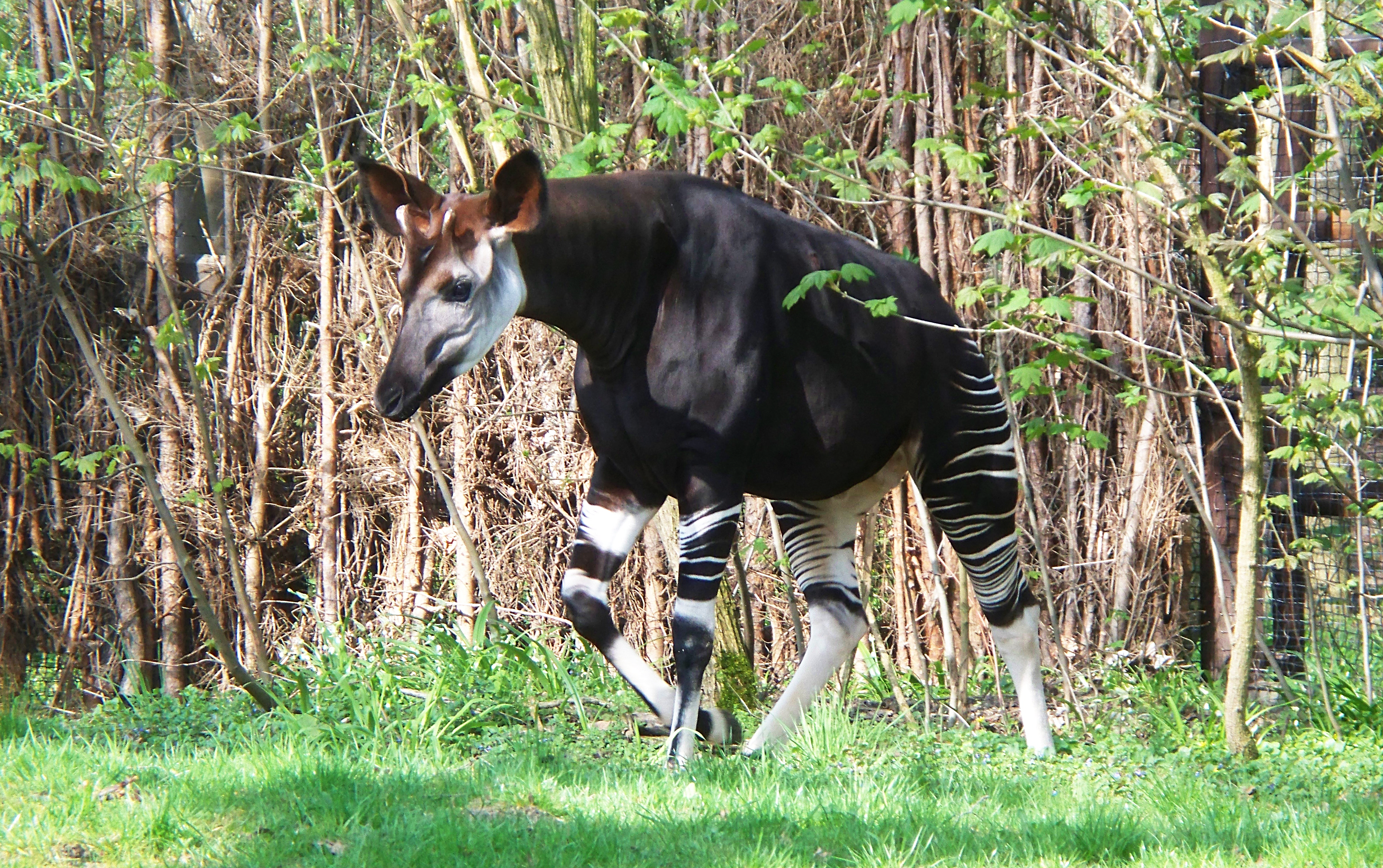
Okapi

On 24 June 2012, the Epulu Conservation and Research Center was attacked, looted and burned by a group of Mai-Mai rebels, led by Paul Sadala (AKA Morgan) consisting of elephant poachers and illegal miners. During the attack, 13 of 14 okapis at the center were killed immediately, the last later dying of its injuries. Six people, including two wildlife rangers, were also killed. Many locals, including children, were abducted, but all were released later. In early August, the security situation had improved due to Congolese army troops and guards from the Congolese Wildlife Authority, and preparations for repairs of the center had begun. Using donations from around the world, it was rebuilt one year after the attack.

On 14 July 2017, there was an attack in the section of the reserve near Mambasa, likely by Mai-Mai rebels. Foreign journalists (two British and an American) and several park rangers escaped unharmed, but five local reserve employees (four wardens and a tracker) were killed. Several attackers were also killed.

Rebel threats are still current. In March 2026, a local Congolese NGO, the Consortium for the Safeguard of the Environment (COSAE) warned against the threat from the Allied Democratic Forces, an Islamist terrorist group operating in Ituri province that occupies the reserve. Earlier that month the ADF had perpetrated a massacre in villages not far from the reserve, killing 50 civilians.

== See also ==
- Centre National d'Appui au Développement et à la Participation populaire
- Corneille Ewango
- Okapi Conservation Project
