= Wamba, Haut-Uele =

Wamba
- Location within Democratic Republic of the Congo
- Coordinates: 2.144239°N 27.992885°E
- Country: DR Congo
- Province: Haut-Uele
- Territory: Wamba
- Time zone: UTC+2 (CAT)
- Climate: Af
- National language: Lingala

Wamba is a town in Haut-Uele province of the Democratic Republic of the Congo that is the administrative centre of Wamba Territory.

== Location and people ==
The area around Wamba consists of a rainforest-derived mosaic of dry, swamp and secondary forest with cultivated fields. Altitude is between 370 metres (1,210 ft) and 430 metres (1,410 ft). Annual rainfall is around 2,000 millimetres (79 in). Both Wamba and nearby Mungbere are inaccessible because of the very poor roads in the region.

== History ==
The Apostolic Vicariate of Wamba was established in 1949 and was promoted to the Diocese of Wamba in 1959. During the Simba Rebellion, in December 1964 rebels held 250 white hostages in Wamba. Two mercenary rescue columns reached the town at the end of the year. They found that 28 whites had been brutally killed, mostly Belgians, including the Bishop Monsignor Joseph-Pierre Albert Wittebols. 121 whites were still alive, mainly Greeks who had provided cash and cooperated with the rebels in exchange for their lives.

== Today ==
The town is home to a station of the Centre de Recherche en Ecologie et Forestiere. Many of the people in these towns rely for their livelihoods on the Okapi Wildlife Reserve, a World Heritage Site. The reserve is home to the rare Okapi species, a relative of the giraffe. Efforts have been made to train the people in alternate ways to make a living and to educate them in the importance of conservation. As of 2011, the Bishop of Wamba was Janvier Kataka Luvete.
