= Mambasa Territory =

Mambasa Territory Wilaya ya Mambasa (Swahili)
- Territory
- Territoire de Mambasa
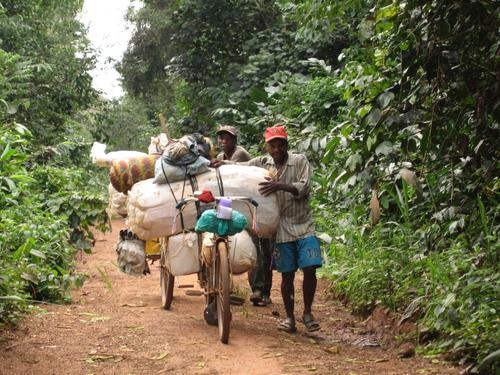
- Two Toleki merchants on the road from Epulu to Mambasa
- Interactive map of Mambasa Territory
- Location within Democratic Republic of the Congo
- Coordinates: 1.36022°N 29.03629°E
- Country: DR Congo
- Province: Ituri
- Seat: Mambasa

Area
  - Total: 36,785 km^{2} (14,203 sq mi)

Population (2020)
  - Total: 989,565
  - Density: 26.901/km^{2} (69.674/sq mi)
- Time zone: UTC+2 (CAT)
- National language: Swahili

Mambasa Territory is an administrative area in the Ituri Province of the Democratic Republic of the Congo. The headquarters is in the town of Mambasa. Mambasa Territory is threatened with deforestation due to illegal forestry to meet high demand for lumber by the bordering countries of Rwanda, Uganda, Burundi and Kenya, as well as to slash and burn cultivation and growing demand for fuel-wood by large numbers of immigrants from the east.

== Towns and villages ==
- Mambasa
- Nia Nia

== Divisions ==
Administrative divisions are:

- Bombo Chiefdom
- Bandaka Chiefdom
- Babila-Babombi Chiefdom
- Mambasa Chiefdom
- Walese-Dese Chiefdom
- Walese-Karo Chiefdom
- Bakwanza Chiefdom

== Politics ==
Mambasa Territory is represented in the National Assembly by two deputies:

- Jefferson Abdallah (PPRD)
- Grégoire Lusenge (RCD/K-ML)
