= Centre National d'Appui au Développement et à la Participation populaire =

CENADEP (Centre National d’Appui au Développement et à la Participation populaire) is an environmental federation of the Democratic Republic of the Congo. CENADEP was founded in 2000. The spokesman is Baudouin Hamuli Kabaruza.
