= Ibambi =

- Location within Democratic Republic of the Congo
- Coordinates: 2.3578°N 27.6267°E
- Country: Democratic Republic of Congo
- Province: Haut-Uele
- Territory: Wamba

Ibambi is a community located in the north-east of the Democratic Republic of the Congo.

== Missionary activity ==
The missionary Charles Studd built up an extensive missionary outreach based on his centre at Ibambi in Budu territory. He was buried there after his death in July 1931. The missionary doctor Helen Roseveare built a combination hospital/ training center in Ibambi in the early 1950s. The CECCA, the local branch of WEC International, operates a secondary school at Ibambi which serves as a college for primary school teachers.
