= Aruwimi River =

River in Democratic Republic of the Congo

Aruwimi River Ituri River Mto Ituri Rivière Ituri
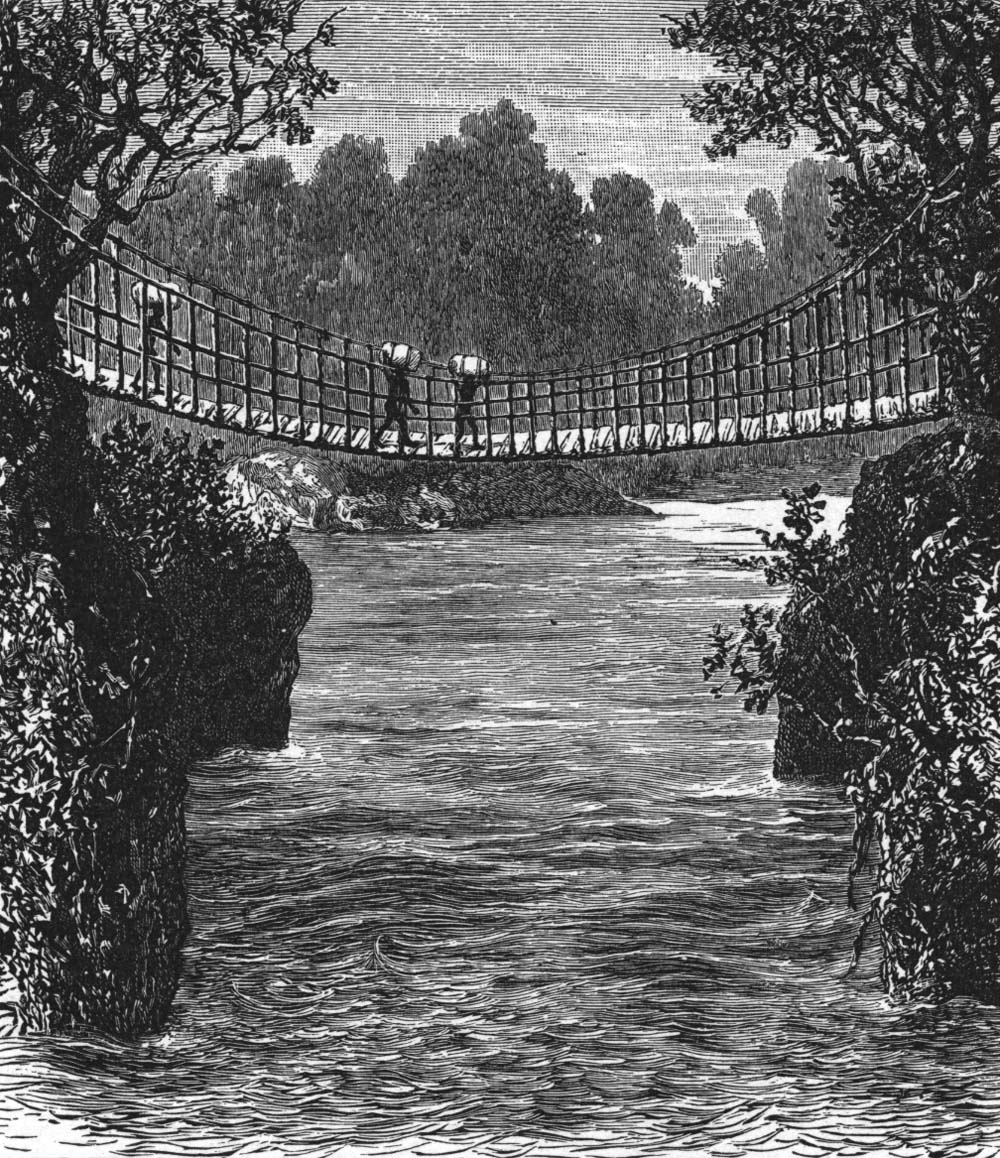

- Location of mouth in the DR Congo

Location
- Country: Democratic Republic of the Congo

Physical characteristics
- Source: Blue Mountains
  - location: Lake Albert
  - coordinates: 2.037°N 30.271°E
  - elevation: 1,491 m (4,892 ft)
- Mouth: Congo River
  - location: Basoko
  - coordinates: 1.223209°N 23.594298°E
  - elevation: 359 m (1,178 ft)
- Length: 1,245 km (774 mi)
- Basin size: 116,100 km^{2} (44,800 sq mi)
- Discharge
  - location: Basoko, (near mouth)
  - average: 2,200 m^{3}/s (78,000 cu ft/s)

Basin features
- River system: Congo River
- Tributaries
  - left: Nepoko River

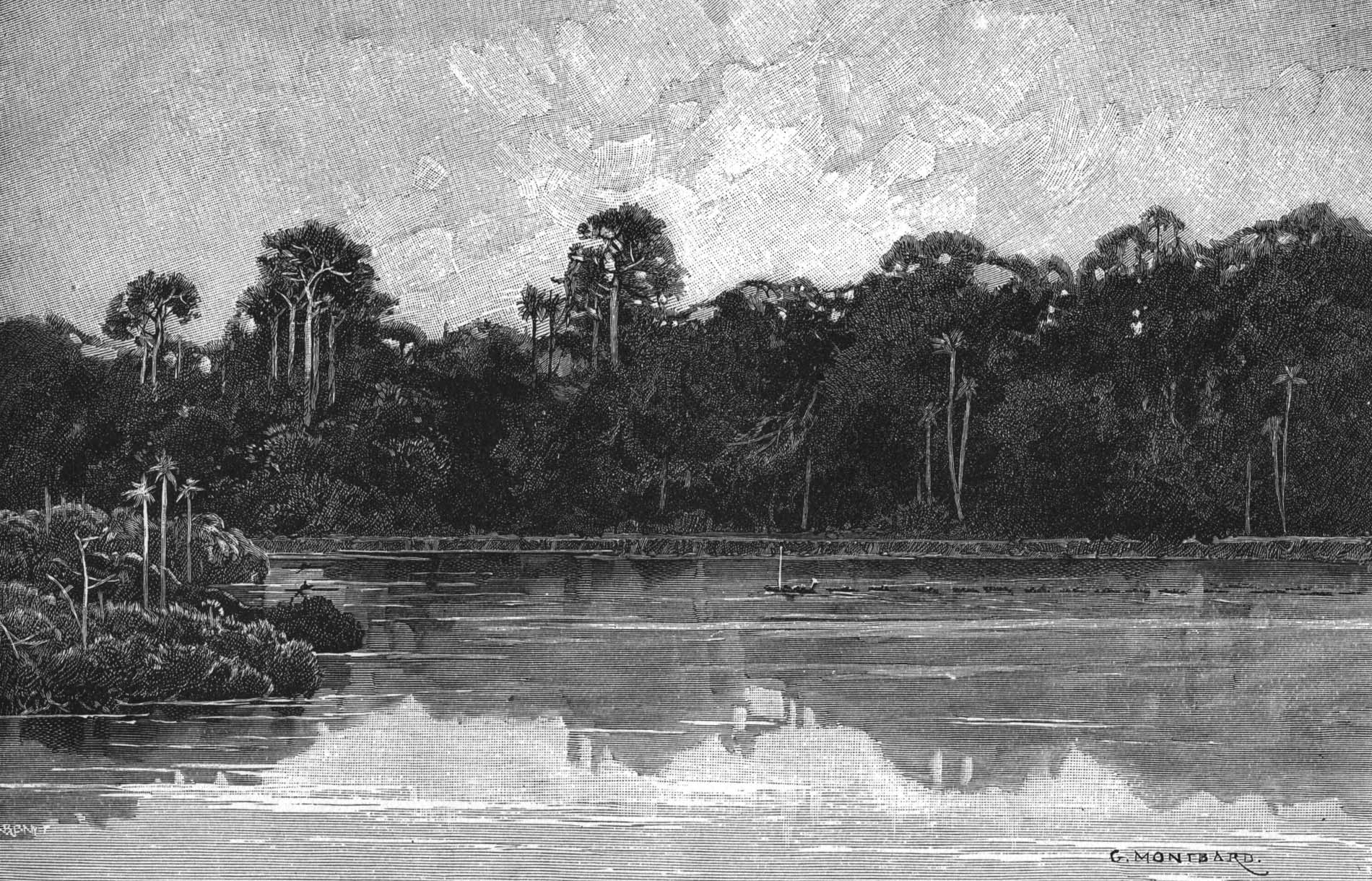
An engraving of Stanley's expedition ascending the Aruwimi, from his book In Darkest Africa, 1890

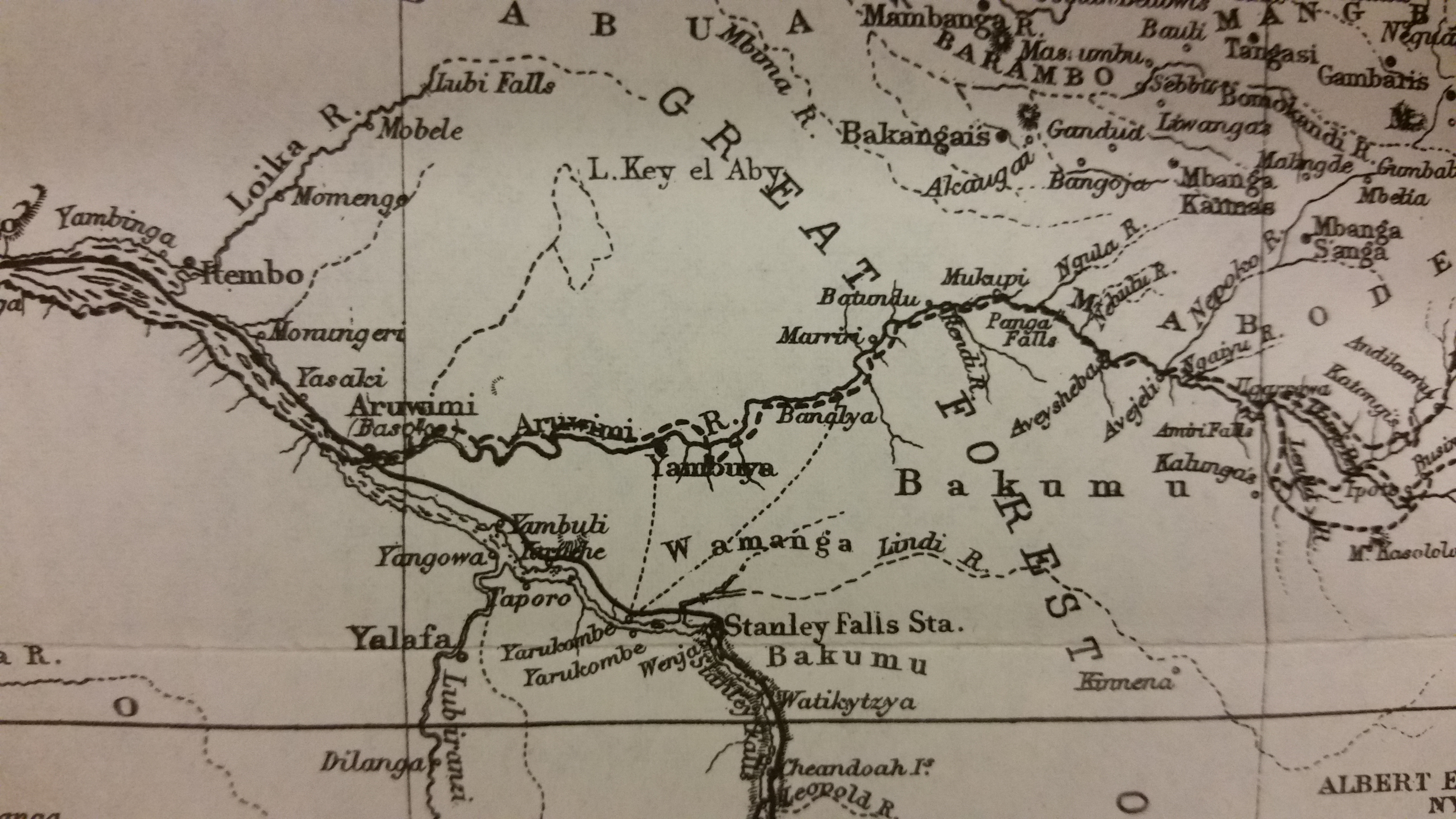
Stanley's routes are indicated by the solid and dashed black lines.

The Aruwimi River (Swahili: Mto Aruwimi, French: Rivière Aruwimi) is a tributary of the Congo River, located to the north and east of the Congo.

The Aruwimi begins as the Ituri River, which rises near Lake Albert, in the savannas north of the Kibale River watershed. It then runs generally south southwest until it is joined by the Shari River which flows by Bunia. The Ituri then turns west, through the Ituri Forest, becoming the Aruwimi where the Nepoko (or Nepoki) River joins it, at the town of Bomili. The river continues westward, joining the Congo at Basoko. The length of the Aruwimi is 1,245.0 km (773.6 mi), with the Upper Ituri (above the confluence with the Shari) being 249.1 kilometres (154.8 mi), the Lower Ituri being 505.2 kilometres (313.9 mi) and the main trunk of the Aruwimi being 490.7 kilometres (304.9 mi). The Aruwimi is about 1.5 kilometres (0.93 mi) wide where it joins the Congo.

The watershed of the Ituri/Aruwimi is almost entirely dense forest, with just a handful of villages along its course, and crossed by roads in about four places. The Kango language (SIL code KZY) is spoken by several thousand villagers just south of Avakubi, and upper reaches of the Ituri are inhabited by the Mbuti (Pygmies).

The Aruwimi was explored by Henry Morton Stanley during his 1887 expedition to "rescue" Emin Pasha. The cataracts above Yambuya made it impossible to use the river for navigation, and the expedition had to go by land, with tremendous difficulty.

Tributaries:

- Nepoko River
- Lenda River

Settlements:

- Bomaneh
- Mongandjo
- Yambuya
- Banalia
- Panga
- Bafwangbe
- Bomili
- Avakubi
- Teturi
- Bunia
