= Mambasa =

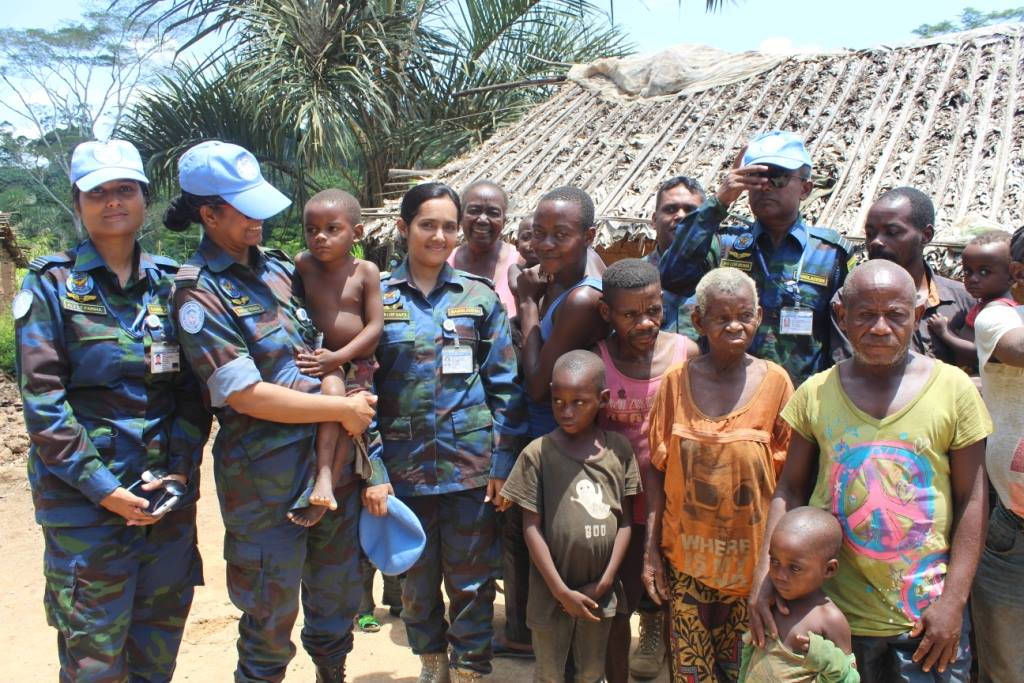
- MONUSCO troops from Bangladesh and locals

- Location within Democratic Republic of the Congo
- Coordinates: 1.3602°N 29.0363°E
- Country: Democratic Republic of Congo
- Province: Ituri Province
- Territory: Mambasa Territory
- Climate: Af
- National language: Swahili

Mambasa is a town in the Ituri Province of the Democratic Republic of the Congo, the headquarters of Mambasa Territory.

== Geography ==
Mambasa is a locality located on national road number 4 (RN4) 174 km west of the provincial capital Bunia.

== Administration ==
The territorial capital had 17,706 voters registered in 2018. The locality has the status of a rural commune of less than 80,000 voters, it has 7 municipal councilors in 2019.
