= Wamba Territory =

Wamba
- Territory
- Interactive map of Wamba
- Coordinates: 2.144239°N 27.992885°E
- Country: DR Congo
- Province: Haut-Uélé
- Seat: Wamba
- Time zone: UTC+2 (Central Africa Time)

Wamba Territory is a part of the Haut-Uele province of the Democratic Republic of the Congo. The administrative center is the town of Wamba.

== Mining ==
As of 2011, Kilo Goldmines was active in a joint venture with Somituri sprl, a local company, in exploiting properties in the territories of Mambasa and Wamba near the village of Nia Nia. Colonial mines produced gold in this area from the 1920s until 1958.

== Divisions ==
The territory is divided into chiefdoms:

- Mabudu-Malika-Baberu Chiefdom
- Bafwakoy Chiefdom
- Balika-Toriko Chiefdom
- Malika Chiefdom
- Bafwagada Chiefdom
- Wadimbisa-Mabudu Chiefdom
- Timoniko Chiefdom
- Makoda Chiefdom
- Mangbele Chiefdom
- Malamba Chiefdom
- Maha Chiefdom

== See also ==
- Roman Catholic Diocese of Wamba
