= Ituri Rainforest =

Rainforest in northeastern DR Congo

Ituri Rainforest Forêt tropicale de l’Ituri
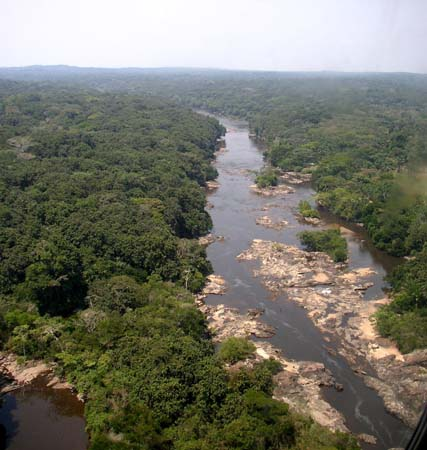
- View of the Epulu River in the Ituri area.

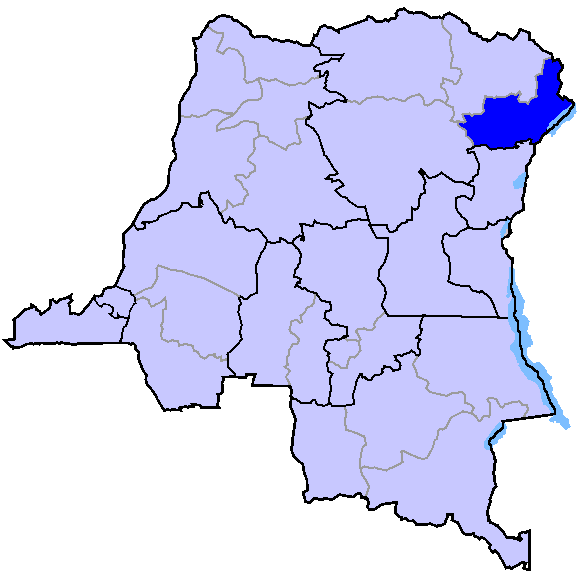
- Map of Ituri within the DRC
- Location: Ituri Province, Democratic Republic of the Congo
- Nearest city: Mambasa, Bunia
- Coordinates: 1.5571°N 28.4491°E
- Area: c. 63,000 km^{2} (24,000 sq mi)

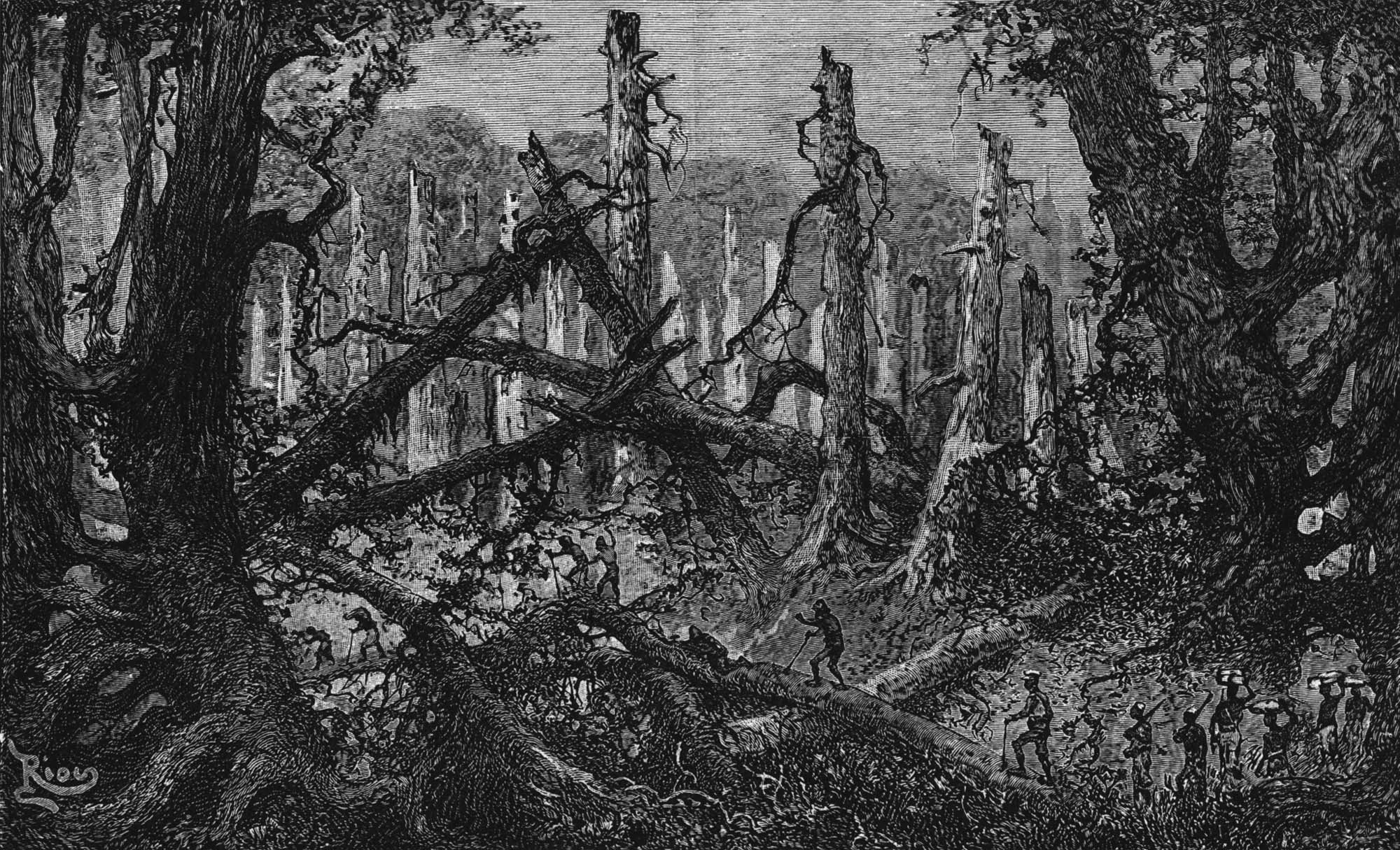
Engraving of Stanley's expedition crossing a clearing in the forest, from his book In Darkest Africa, 1890

The Ituri Rainforest (French: Forêt tropicale de l’Ituri) is a rainforest located in the Ituri Province of northeastern Democratic Republic of the Congo. The forest's name derives from the nearby Ituri River which flows through the rainforest, connecting firstly to the Aruwimi River and finally into the Congo.

== Geography ==
The Ituri Rainforest is about 63,000 km^{2} (24,000 square miles) in area, and is located between 0° and 3°N and 27° and 30° E. Elevation in the Ituri ranges from about 700 to 1,000 m (2,300 to 3,300 feet). The climate is warm and humid, as exemplified by the nearby city of Bunia, which however is at a slightly higher elevation. About one-fifth of the rainforest is made up of the Okapi Wildlife Reserve, a World Heritage Site.

It is also the home of the Mbuti pygmies, one of the hunter-gatherer peoples living in equatorial rainforests characterised by their short height (below one and a half metres or 59 inches, on average). They have been the subject of research by a variety of outsiders, including Patrick and Anne Eisner Putnam, who lived on the banks of the Epulu River at the edge of the Ituri. They were also the subject of a well-known study by Colin Turnbull, The Forest People, which was published in 1962.

The Ituri rainforest was first traversed by Europeans in 1887 by Henry Morton Stanley on his Emin Pasha Relief Expedition.
